= Ukraine and weapons of mass destruction =

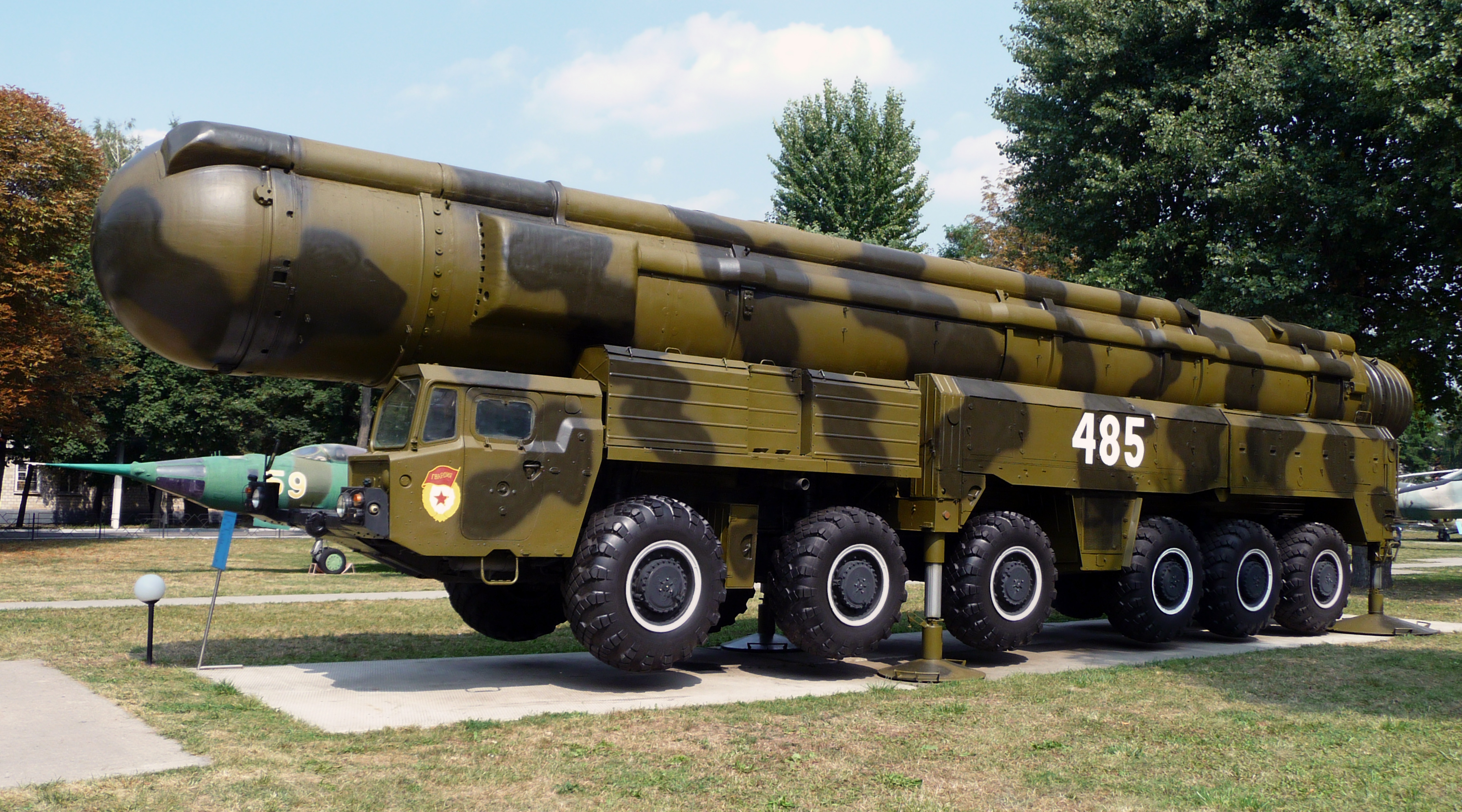
Nuclear complex SS-20 Saber in Vinnytsia

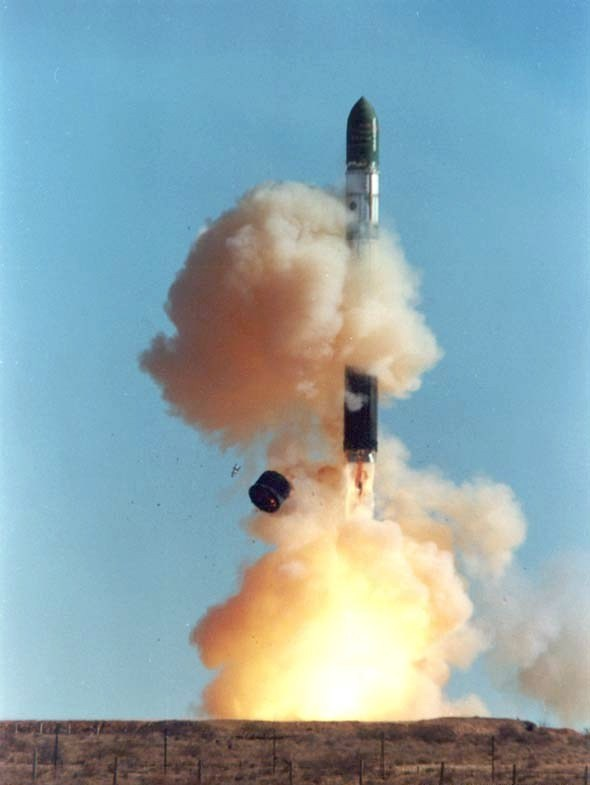
SS-18 Satan nuclear missile fully designed and manufactured in Ukraine at Yuzhmash

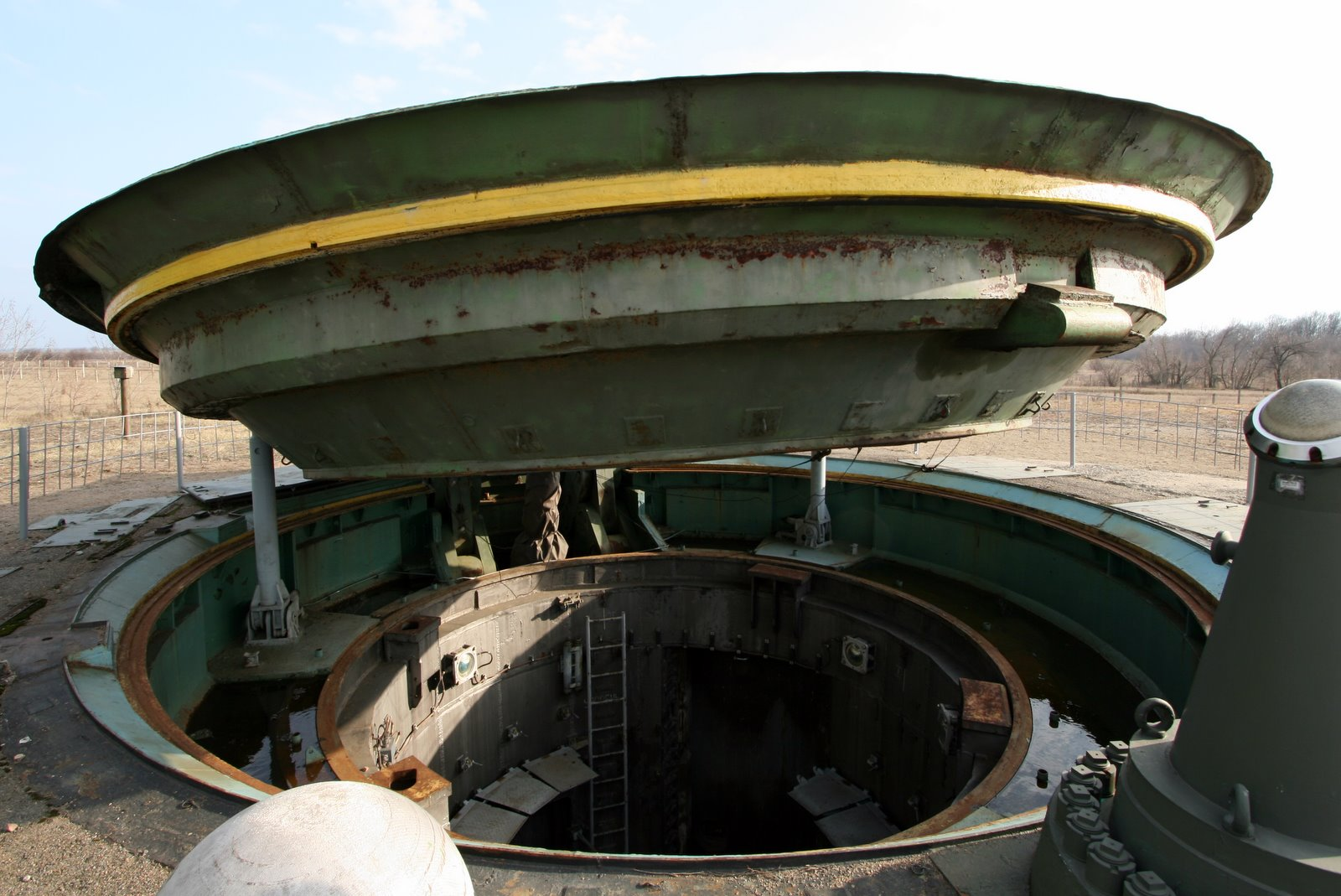
Missile silo in central Ukraine for a SS-24 missile

Ukraine, formerly a republic of the Soviet Union (USSR) from 1922 to 1991, once hosted Soviet nuclear weapons and delivery systems on its territory. The former Soviet Union had its nuclear program expanded to only four of its republics: Belarus, Kazakhstan, Russia, and Ukraine. After its dissolution in 1991, Ukraine inherited about 130 UR-100N intercontinental ballistic missiles (ICBM) with six warheads each, 46 RT-23 Molodets ICBMs with ten warheads apiece, as well as 33 heavy bombers, totaling approximately 1,700 nuclear warheads that remained on Ukrainian territory. Thus Ukraine became the third largest nuclear power in the world (possessing 300 more nuclear warheads than Kazakhstan, 6.5 times less than the United States, and ten times less than Russia) and held about one third of the former Soviet nuclear weapons, delivery system, and significant knowledge of its design and production. While all these weapons were located on Ukrainian territory, initially they were not under Ukraine's control.

In July 1993, the Ukrainian parliament proclaimed ownership of the former Soviet nuclear weapons deployed on its territory. Testimony from the same year by Bruce G. Blair cited the Russian Ministry of Defence’s Chief Directorate for Nuclear Munitions, Colonel General Yevgeniy Maslin, who reportedly stated that Russia had de facto lost control over the nuclear weapons stationed in Ukraine. The same report noted that crews operating strategic nuclear bombers, along with subunits responsible for nuclear munitions, had been incorporated into the Ukrainian Armed Forces, while Moscow still retained operational control over the strategic missile forces at that time. By late 1993, some estimates suggested that Ukraine could break the nuclear release codes between December 1993 and March 1994, as there were no fundamental obstacles preventing it from doing so.

In 1994, under the Budapest Memorandum, Ukraine agreed to transfer these weapons to Russia for dismantlement and became a party to the Treaty on the Non-Proliferation of Nuclear Weapons, in exchange for economic compensation and assurances from Russia, the United States and the United Kingdom to respect Ukrainian independence and sovereignty within its existing borders. In 2014, Russia invaded and annexed Crimea, a violation of its assurances under the Budapest Memorandum that was compounded by Russia's full-scale invasion in 2022.

== Nuclear arsenal after dissolution of the Soviet Union ==
After the dissolution of the Soviet Union, about one-third of the Soviet nuclear arsenal was deployed on Ukrainian territory. Ukraine also had significant capabilities for nuclear weapon design and production. 130 UR-100N/RS-18 intercontinental ballistic missiles (ICBM) with six warheads each, 46 RT-23 Molodets ICBMs with ten warheads apiece, as well as 33 heavy bombers, totalling approximately 1,700 warheads remained on Ukrainian territory, along with 2,883 tactical nuclear weapons.

Forty of the underground launch silos for the RT-23 ICBMs had been installed around the city of Pervomaisk in the Mykolaiv Oblast, the home of the 46th Rocket Division of the 43rd Rocket Army of the Soviet Strategic Rocket Forces. The individual silos were scattered across the general area and often located on fields, surrounded by a fence and guarded. A group of nine or ten silos was connected to a common, underground Unified Command Post staffed by several military officers.

As a republic in the Soviet Union, Ukraine was the base for the following nuclear force units:

- 43rd Rocket Army
  - 19th Rocket Division (Rakovo, Khmelnytskyi Oblast) (see uk:19-та ракетна дивізія (СРСР))
  - 37th Guards Rocket Division (Lutsk, Volyn Oblast)
  - 43rd Guards Rocket Division (Romny, Sumy Oblast)
  - 46th Rocket Division (Pervomaisk, Nikolayev Oblast)
  - 50th Rocket Division (Bilokorovychi, Zhitomir Oblast)
Positions of Soviet 43rd Rocket Army divisions in Ukraine

All military personnel except those in the Black Sea Fleet had taken loyalty oaths to Ukraine.

== Budapest Memorandum ==
The Declaration of State Sovereignty of Ukraine in 1990 stated that Ukraine would not accept, acquire, or produce nuclear weapons, and its government declared on 24 October 1991 that Ukraine would be a non-nuclear-weapon state.

On December 5, 1994, the leaders of Ukraine, Russia, United Kingdom, and the United States signed a memorandum to provide Ukraine with security assurances in connection with its accession to the NPT as a non-nuclear weapon state. The four parties signed the memorandum, containing a preamble and six paragraphs. The memorandum reads as follows:

The United States of America, the Russian Federation, and the United Kingdom of Great Britain and Northern Ireland,

Welcoming the accession of Ukraine to the Treaty on the Non-Proliferation of Nuclear Weapons as non-nuclear-weapon State,

Taking into account the commitment of Ukraine to eliminate all nuclear weapons from its territory within a specified period of time,

Noting the changes in the world-wide security situation, including the end of the Cold War, which have brought about conditions for deep reductions in nuclear forces.

Confirm the following:

1. The Russian Federation, the United Kingdom of Great Britain and Northern Ireland and the United States of America reaffirm their commitment to Ukraine, in accordance with the principles of the Final Act of the Conference on Security and Cooperation in Europe, to respect the independence and sovereignty and the existing borders of Ukraine.
2. The Russian Federation, the United Kingdom of Great Britain and Northern Ireland and the United States of America reaffirm their obligation to refrain from the threat or use of force against the territorial integrity or political independence of Ukraine, and that none of their weapons will ever be used against Ukraine except in self-defence or otherwise in accordance with the Charter of the United Nations.
3. The Russian Federation, the United Kingdom of Great Britain and Northern Ireland and the United States of America reaffirm their commitment to Ukraine, in accordance with the principles of the Final Act of the Conference on Security and Cooperation in Europe, to refrain from economic coercion designed to subordinate to their own interest the exercise by Ukraine of the rights inherent in its sovereignty and thus to secure advantages of any kind.
4. The Russian Federation, the United Kingdom of Great Britain and Northern Ireland and the United States of America reaffirm their commitment to seek immediate United Nations Security Council action to provide assistance to Ukraine, as a non-nuclear-weapon State party to the Treaty on the Non-Proliferation of Nuclear Weapons, if Ukraine should become a victim of an act of aggression or an object of a threat of aggression in which nuclear weapons are used.
5. The Russian Federation, the United Kingdom of Great Britain and Northern Ireland and the United States of America reaffirm, in the case of Ukraine, their commitment not to use nuclear weapons against any non-nuclear-weapon State party to the Treaty on the Non-Proliferation of Nuclear Weapons, except in the case of an attack on themselves, their territories or dependent territories, their armed forces, or their allies, by such a State in association or alliance with a nuclear-weapon State.
6. Ukraine, the Russian Federation, the United Kingdom of Great Britain and Northern Ireland and the United States of America will consult in the event a situation arises that raises a question concerning these commitments.

— Memorandum on Security Assurances in Connection with Ukraine's Accession to the Treaty on the Non-Proliferation of Nuclear Weapons

== France and China's commitments ==
France and China also provided Ukraine with assurances similar to the Budapest Memorandum, but with some significant differences. For instance, France's pledge does not contain the promises laid out in paragraphs 4 and 6 above, to refer any aggression to the UN Security Council, nor to consult in the event of a question regarding the commitments.

China's pledge takes a different form entirely, dating from December 4, and reading as follows:

- The Chinese Government welcomes the decision of Ukraine to destroy all nuclear weapons on its territory, and commends the approval by the Verkhovna Rada of Ukraine on November 16 of Ukraine's accession to the Treaty on the Non-Proliferation of Nuclear Weapons as a non-nuclear-weapon State. China fully understands the desire of Ukraine for security assurance. The Chinese Government has always maintained that under no circumstances will China use or threaten to use nuclear weapons against non-nuclear-weapon States or nuclear-weapon-free zones. This principled position also applies to Ukraine. The Chinese Government urges all other nuclear-weapon States to undertake the same commitment, so as to enhance the security of all non-nuclear-weapon States, including Ukraine.
- The Chinese Government has constantly opposed the practice of exerting political, economic, or other pressure in international relations. It maintains that disputes and differences should be settled peacefully through consultations on an equal footing. Abiding by the spirit of the Sino-Ukrainian joint communiqué of January 4, 1992 on the establishment of diplomatic relations, the Sino-Ukrainian joint communiqué of October 31, 1992 and the Sino-Ukrainian joint statement of September 6, 1994, China recognizes and respects the independence, sovereignty and territorial integrity of Ukraine, and stands ready to further develop friendly and cooperative Sino-Ukraine relations on the basis of the Five Principles of Peaceful Coexistence.

Thus, China's pledge, similar to France's, does not pledge to involve UN or consultative mechanisms in case of crisis. However, it does pledge to respect the sovereignty and territorial integrity of Ukraine.

== Removal of nuclear weapons ==
After the Budapest Memorandum was signed, the United States used its Nunn–Lugar Cooperative Threat Reduction programme to provide financial assistance over $300 million (equivalent to $652 million in 2025), and technical assistance in decommissioning the nuclear weapons and delivery systems, which took to 2008 to fully complete. The U.S. also doubled other economic aid to Ukraine to $310 million (equivalent to $673 million in 2025) for 1994.

According to a South Korean declassified document, in 1994, Russia offered to repay a debt by converting 50 tonnes of highly enriched uranium removed from Ukrainian nuclear warheads into 1,500 tonnes of low-enriched uranium (LEU) for reactor fuel and supplying the ROK with 150 tonnes of LEU annually for 10 years.

== Russian invasion and nuclear weapons ==
Russian forces withdrew nuclear weapons and delivery systems from the Crimean peninsula after the dissolution of the Soviet Union, in the mid-1990s, with the exception of some nuclear-capable ships and submarines of the Black Sea Fleet stationed in accordance with agreements with Ukraine. After Russia's annexation of Crimea in 2014, which the UN General Assembly rejected as invalid, the Government of Ukraine in 2014 reaffirmed its 1994 decision to accede to the Nuclear Non-Proliferation Treaty as a non-nuclear-weapon state. Meanwhile, the Russian Federation again re-deployed nuclear-capable weapons to the peninsula, including S-300 antiaircraft missiles, and later Tu-22M3 Backfire bombers and Iskander-M ballistic missiles. In 2020, a Ukrainian NSDC official stated that Russia had done work on Soviet nuclear-weapons storage facility Feodosiia-13 in Krasnokamianka (Kyzyltash), and had added new tunnels to a nuclear submarine base at Balaklava.

Soon after the annexation of Crimea, Pavlo Rizanenko, a member of the Ukrainian parliament, told USA Today that Ukraine may have to arm themselves with their own nuclear weapons if the United States and other world leaders do not hold up their end of the agreement. He said, "We gave up nuclear weapons because of this agreement. Now, there's a strong sentiment in Ukraine that we made a big mistake." He also said that, "In the future, no matter how the situation is resolved in Crimea, we need a much stronger Ukraine. If you have nuclear weapons, people don't invade you." On December 13, 2014 Ukrainian President Petro Poroshenko stated that he did not want Ukraine to become a nuclear power again.

During the subsequent invasion of Ukraine Russia started using their own nuclear weapons as a deterrent against a potential military intervention by other countries. In July 2014, Russian Foreign Minister Sergey Lavrov stated that Russia has the right to defend Crimea using nuclear weapons, and in March 2015 president Putin said that during the invasion of Crimea he had been prepared to put nuclear forces on alert. Around the same time, a Russian foreign ministry official said that Russia had the right to deploy nuclear arms to the peninsula, which is internationally recognized as Ukrainian territory.

== Debates about Ukrainian re-nuclearization ==
In 1993, international relations theorist and University of Chicago professor John Mearsheimer predicted that a Ukraine without a nuclear deterrent was likely to be subjected to aggression by Russia.

However, Mariana Budjeryn, a Ukrainian scholar at Harvard argued that the denuclearization of Ukraine was not a mistake and that it was unclear whether Ukraine would be better off as a nuclear state. She argued that the deterrent value of the nuclear weapons in Ukraine was questionable. While Ukraine had "administrative control" of the weapons delivery systems, it would have needed 12 to 18 months to establish full operational control, and Ukraine would have faced sanctions from the West and likely retaliation from Russia. Moreover, Ukraine had no nuclear weapons program and would have struggled to replace nuclear weapons once their service life expired. Instead, by agreeing to give up the nuclear weapons, Ukraine received financial compensations and the security assurances of the Budapest Memorandum.

Andreas Umland, an analyst from the Swedish Institute of International Affairs, assessed that giving up its nuclear weapons had been a mistake by Ukraine, as breaking the Budapest Memorandum would have only limited consequences for Russia. He argued that states party to the Nuclear Non-Proliferation Treaty could not rely on security assurances, but could only ensure their sovereignty by having a nuclear deterrent of their own. Following Russia's invasion of Ukraine in 2022, Umland along with Hugo von Essen, reiterated that Russia's actions had weakened the Nuclear Non-Proliferation Treaty significantly. They argued that Russia's invasion of Ukraine was only possible because Russia was kept fundamentally safe by its own nuclear arsenal, whereas Ukraine had made a mistake by giving up its own nuclear weapons.

On April 15, 2021, Ukrainian Ambassador to Germany Melnyk said that if Ukraine is not allowed to join NATO, his country might have to reconsider its status as a non-nuclear weapon state to guarantee its defense.

On February 19, 2022, a few days before the Russian invasion of Ukraine, Ukrainian president Volodymyr Zelenskyy renewed such sentiments at the Munich Security Conference, suggesting that Ukraine could view the Budapest Memorandum as invalid should its security assurances not be met. He stated that since 2014 Ukraine had sought consultations with the guarantor states under the Budapest Memorandum three times without success, adding: "This will be the fourth time today that we are going to do this. As a President, for the first time, but both Ukraine and I will do this the last time. We are initiating, under the Budapest Memorandum, a call for the announced Foreign Minister to have this meeting. And if, as a result of this, we are not going to guarantee of defense after this summit, we would think that the Budapest Memorandum is not working, and that all the package decisions of 1994 have been put in question and compromised."

As of 2022 only three Ukrainian political parties supported bringing back nuclear weapons: Svoboda, Radical Party of Oleh Liashko, and the National Corps.

In April 2023, former US president Bill Clinton expressed regret at pressuring Ukraine to give up nuclear weapons, in light of the 2014 Russian invasion of Ukraine and escalation of the Russo-Ukrainian War from 2022.

On 17 October 2024, President Zelenskyy claimed that he told former US president Donald Trump that if Ukraine was unable to secure NATO membership, it would have no option but to reacquire a nuclear arsenal.

On 13 November 2024, a report by a Ukrainian think tank that advises the Ukrainian government stated that Ukraine could construct a crude nuclear device "within months" if President Trump cut aid to Ukraine. Such weapons would use plutonium extracted from spent fuel from Ukraine's nuclear power plants. Ukraine's Foreign Ministry responded that Ukraine remains committed to the NPT and does not intend to acquire nuclear weapons.

A poll conducted in December 2024 by the Kyiv International Institute of Sociology (KIIS) revealed that 73% of Ukrainians surveyed in the poll favored Ukraine obtaining nuclear weapons, with the percentage dropping to 46% if that entailed loss of Western support and sanctions, but rising to 58% if Ukraine could hold out until obtaining nuclear weapons.
