= Vladimir Yakovlev (general) =

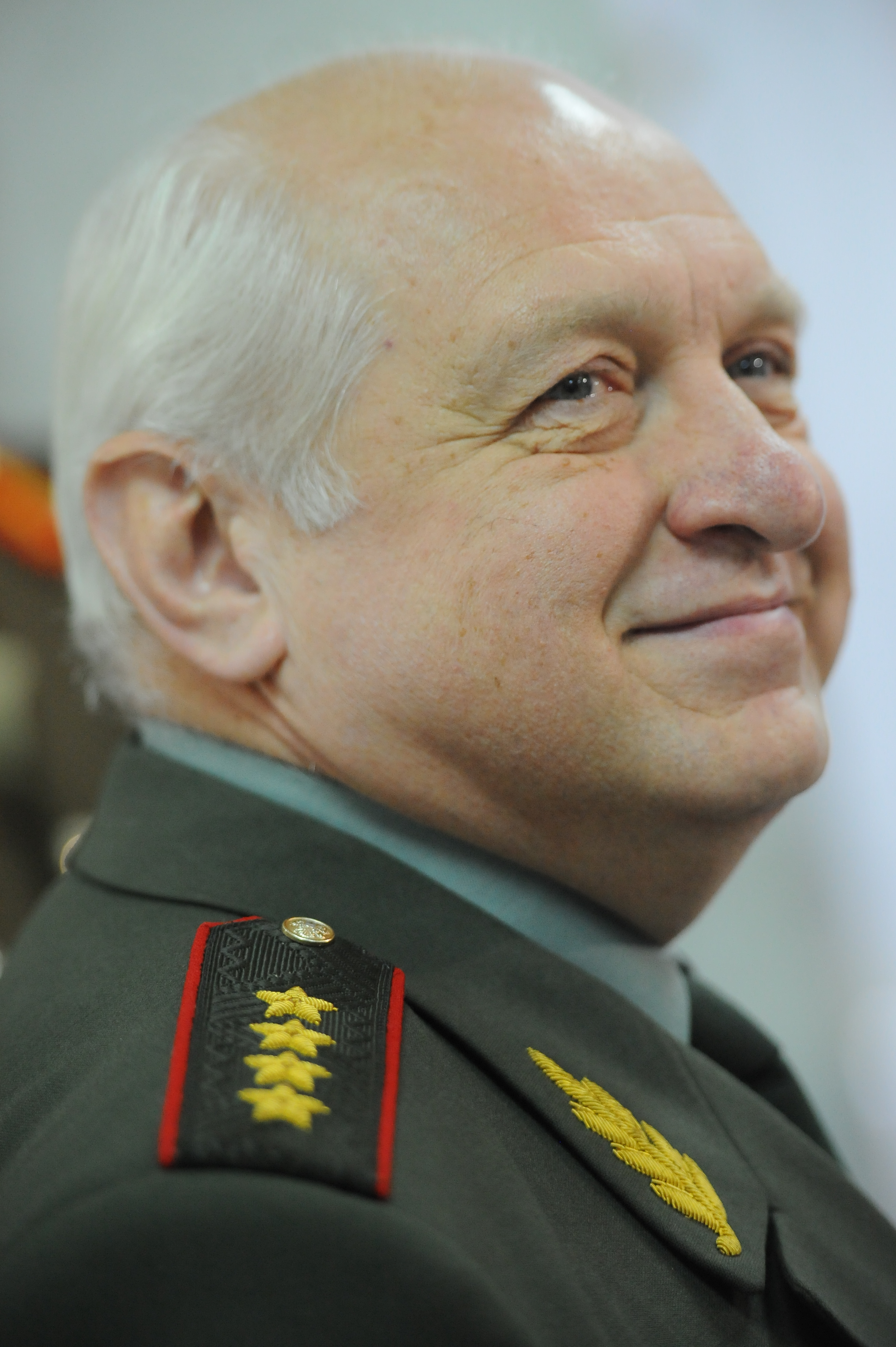
- Yakovlev in 2011
- Born: August 17, 1954 (age 72); Kalinin, Russian SFSR, USSR
- Alma mater: Kharkov Higher Military Command-Engineering School; Dzerzhinsky Military Academy
- Military career
- Allegiance: Soviet Union (to 1991); Russia
- Branch: Strategic Rocket Forces
- Service years: 1976–2006
- Commands: Commander of the Strategic Rocket Forces; 27th Guards Rocket Army; 60th Rocket Division

General of the Army Vladimir Nikolayevich Yakovlev (Russian: Влади́мир Никола́евич Я́ковлев; born August 17, 1954) is a retired Russian Strategic Rocket Forces officer who was the commander of the Strategic Rocket Forces from 1997 to 2001.

== Early life ==
He was born in Kalinin, now Tver, the administrative center of Tver Oblast, Russia. He applied to Kalinin Suvorov Military School, but failed the admissions exam. He graduated with honors from his local high school in 1971.

He entered Kharkov Higher Military Command-Engineering School. He established himself as a competent team leader and was made a course leader.

Yakovlev then went to college, graduating in 1976, which led to an assignment in a missile regiment.

== Career ==
Yakovlev served as an engineer, senior engineer and team leader. Due to his success at Combat Duty alerting, Yakovlev was appointed Chief of Staff of the missile regiment in 1981.

In 1983, Yakovlev enrolled in the command school of the Dzerzhinsky Military Academy, graduating in 1985. While there, he earned a gold medal and then was sent to become the post commander of the 6th Guards missile regiment of Riga (Pervomais'k-on-Bug). In 1989, he became deputy commander of a missile division.

In 1991, Yakovlev was appointed Guard Division Commander of the 60th Missile Division in the city Tatishevo-5 in the Tatischevskogo district of Saratov region. Yakovlev made special efforts to improve the living conditions of military families residing there.

In 1993, Yakovlev was appointed chief of staff of the 60th Missile Division, and in 1994 was made Commander of the 27th Guards Rocket Army in Vladimir Oblast.

In December 1996, Yakovlev was appointed Chief of Staff of the Strategic Missile Forces. In July, 1997, he became, at age 43, the youngest-ever Chief of the Strategic Missile Forces. His next promotion, to General, was awarded by Presidential Decree of Vladimir Putin on June 27, 2000.

In April, 2001, Yakovlev was released from his post of Commander in connection with the conversion of the Strategic Missile Forces of the Armed Forces. He was appointed chief of staff for coordination of military cooperation for the Commonwealth of Independent States. He remained there until 2004. He served as an advisor during 2006 - 2009 to the CEO of FSUE "Rosoboronexport".

From December 2009 to May 2012, Yakovlev was chief of the Military Academy of the General Staff of the Armed Forces of the Russian Federation.

As of 2014 he remained a corresponding Member of the Russian Academy of Missile and Artillery Sciences, Academician of the Russian Academy of Engineering, Professor of the Academy of Military Sciences of the Russian Federation and Candidate of Military Sciences (1997). He received the Laureate of the President of the Russian Federation in the field of education for 1998.

Yakovlev currently resides in Moscow. He is married and has two daughters.

Military offices
Preceded by Stanislav Chilikin	Commander of the 60th Rocket Division; 1991–1993	Succeeded by Yuri Kononov
Preceded by Ivan Vershkov	Commander of the 27th Guards Rocket Army; 1994–1996	Succeeded by Yuri Kirillov
Preceded by Viktor Yesin	Chief of the Main Staff of the Strategic Rocket Forces; 1996–1997	Succeeded by Anatoly Perminov
Preceded by Igor Sergeyev	Commander of the Strategic Rocket Forces; 1997–2001	Succeeded by Nikolai Solovtsov
Preceded by Viktor Prudnikov	Chief of Staff for Coordinating Military Cooperation of the CIS Member States; 2001–2006	Position abolished
