= Taman Division =

Taman Division may refer to units Soviet Army with the honorific of "Taman":

- 2nd Guards Motor Rifle Division
- 32nd Guards Motor Rifle Division
- 60th Missile Division, 27th Guards Rocket Army
- 74th Rifle Division
- 89th Rifle Division (Soviet Union)

== See also ==
- Red Army
