= Igor Sergeyev =

Former Minister of Defense, Russian Federation

Marshal of the Russian Federation Igor Sergeyev
- Игорь Сергеев
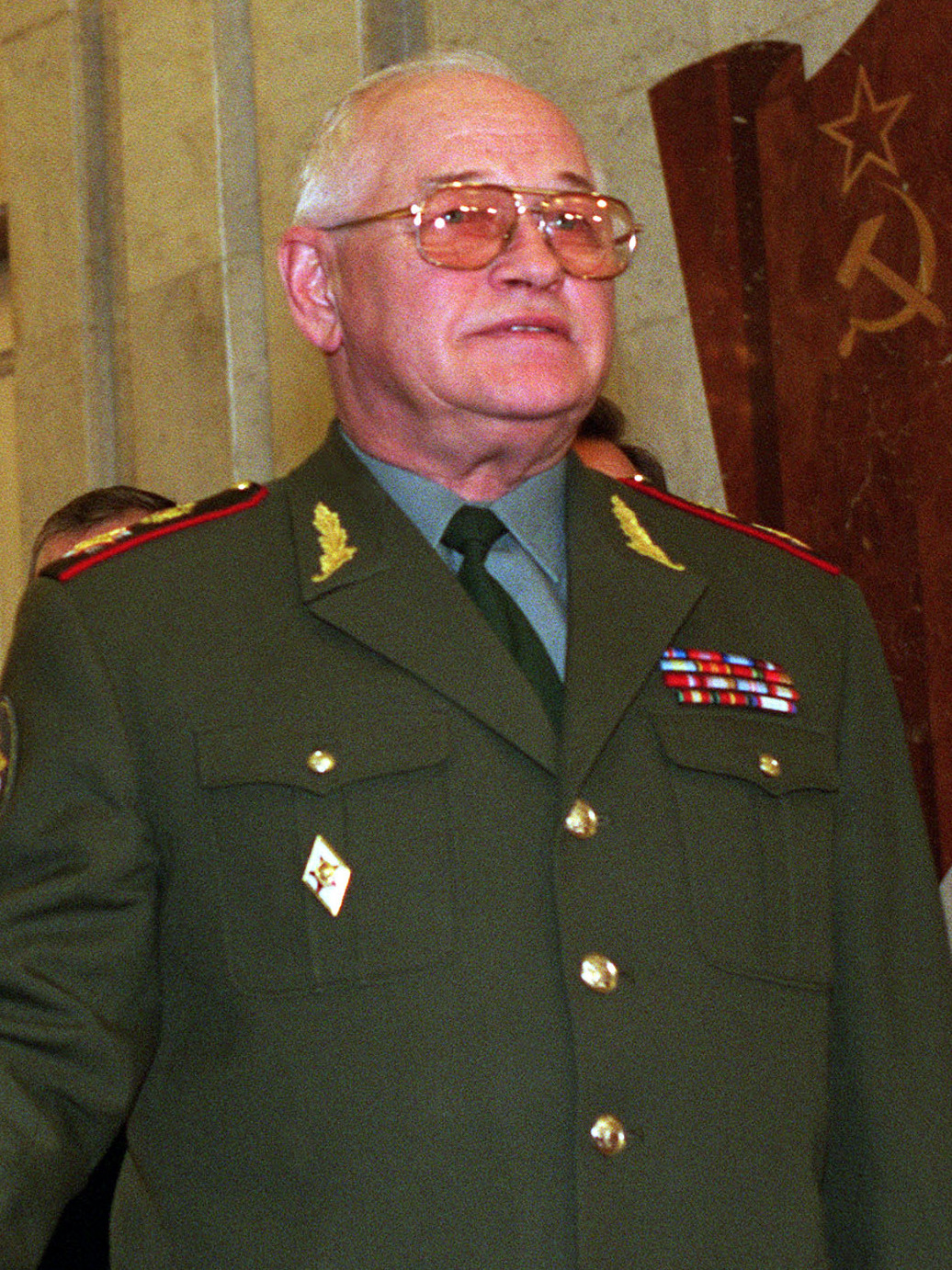
- Sergeyev in 2000

4th Minister of Defence
- In office 22 May 1997 – 28 March 2001
- President: Boris Yeltsin; Vladimir Putin
- Prime Minister: See list: Viktor Chernomyrdin; Sergei Kiriyenko; Viktor Chernomyrdin (Acting); Yevgeny Primakov; Sergei Stepashin; Vladimir Putin; Mikhail Kasyanov
- Preceded by: Igor Rodionov
- Succeeded by: Sergei Ivanov

Commander of the Strategic Rocket Forces
- In office 26 August 1992 – 22 May 1997
- Preceded by: Yuri Maksimov
- Succeeded by: Vladimir Yakovlev

Personal details
- Born: Igor Dmitriyevich Sergeyev; 20 April 1938 Verkhnyeye, Voroshilovgrad Oblast, Ukrainian SSR, Soviet Union
- Died: 10 November 2006 (aged 68) Moscow, Russia
- Resting place: Troyekurovskoye Cemetery
- Spouse: Tamara Sergeyeva
- Education: Military Academy of the General Staff of the Armed Forces of Russia
- Awards: Hero of the Russian Federation

Military service
- Allegiance: Soviet Union (to 1991); Russia
- Branch/service: Soviet Navy; Strategic Rocket Forces
- Years of service: 1955–2001
- Rank: Marshal of the Russian Federation
- Commands: Ministry of Defense of the Russian Federation
- Battles/wars: War of Dagestan; Second Chechen War

Igor Dmitriyevich Sergeyev (Russian: Игорь Дмитриевич Сергеев; 20 April 1938 – 10 November 2006) was a Soviet and later Russian military officer who was Minister of Defense of Russia from 22 May 1997 to 28 March 2001. Before that he was the commander of the Strategic Rocket Forces from 26 August 1992 to 22 May 1997. He was the first and, as of 2026, the only Marshal of the Russian Federation.

== Career ==
=== Early life and career ===
Sergeyev graduated from the school No. 22 in Makiivka in 1955. From 1955 to 1960 he studied at the military college, which he graduated with honors. After graduation he was appointed commander of the squad of ballistic missiles testing of the 37th ballistic missile division. From 1962 to 1963 he served as deputy commander for technical part of the ballistic missile battery. In 1963 he was appointed assistant to the chief of the engineering service of the ballistic missile regiment. From 1965 to 1968 he was deputy commander for armament of the ballistic missile battalion. In 1968 he became deputy squad commander for combat readiness and combat training of the ballistic missile division. From 1970 to 1971 he was chief of staff of the 351st ballistic missile regiment.

From 1971 to 1973, Sergeyev studied at the Military Academy of the Strategic Missile Forces of the Soviet Union, from which he graduated with honors. After graduation, he was appointed commander of the 543rd ballistic missile regiment. In 1975, he was appointed chief of staff and – later – commander of the 46th ballistic missile division.

From 1978 to 1980, Sergeyev studied at the Military Academy of the General Staff of the Armed Forces of the USSR. After graduation, he was appointed Chief of Staff of the 43rd Rocket Army in Ukraine. In 1983, he was appointed chief of the Operations Directorate of the Main Staff of the Strategic Missile Forces of the Soviet Union. In 1985, he was appointed first deputy chief of the Main Staff of the Strategic Missile Forces of the Soviet Union. From 1989 to 1992, he served as deputy commander-in-chief for combat training of the Strategic Missile Forces of the Soviet Union.

By a decree of the President of the Russian Federation of 19 August 1992 No. 905, Sergeyev was appointed Commander-in-Chief of the Strategic Rocket Forces of Russia. On 13 August 1996, he was promoted to army general.

In 1994, Sergeyev received an academic degree of the doctor of technical sciences with a thesis on combat control systems.

=== Defense Minister ===
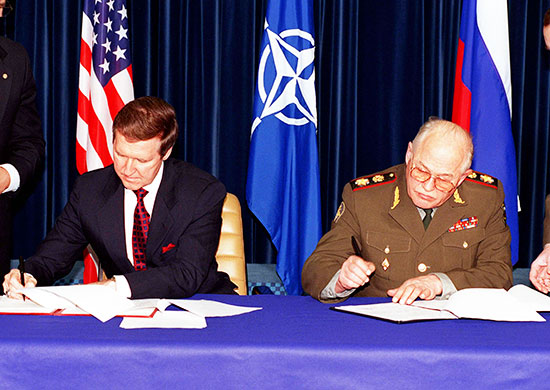
Sergeyev with U.S. Defense Secretary William Cohen signing a cooperation agreement, 1997

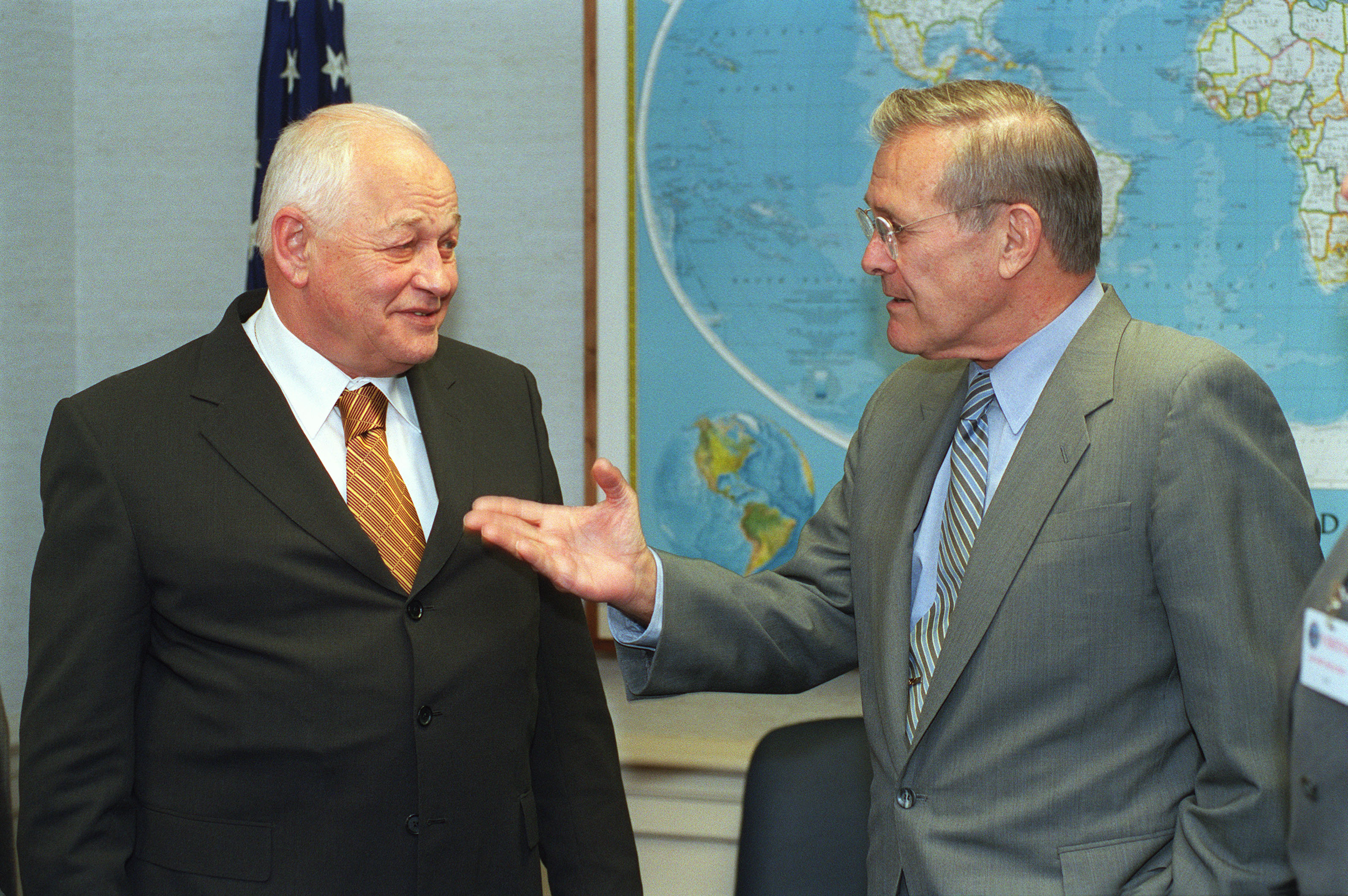
Sergeyev at the Pentagon with Secretary Donald Rumsfeld, 2001

On 22 May 1997, Sergeyev was appointed Minister of Defense of Russia in 1997 by the President of Russia Boris Yeltsin. He was promoted to Marshal of the Russian Federation on 21 November 1997.

Marshal Sergeyev accepted reform within a limited budget under civilian political control. The number of military educational establishments was reduced markedly from their previous levels, which had not changed since Soviet times. A number of army divisions were given "permanent readiness" status, which was supposed to bring them up to 80 percent manning and 100 percent equipment holdings. Sergeyev directed most of his efforts toward promoting the interests of the Strategic Rocket Forces. All military space forces were absorbed into the Strategic Rocket Forces, and the Ground Forces Headquarters was abolished. The Airborne Forces suffered some reductions, while the Naval Infantry only escaped due to their competent performance in Chechnya. Much of the available procurement money was invested in acquiring new rockets.

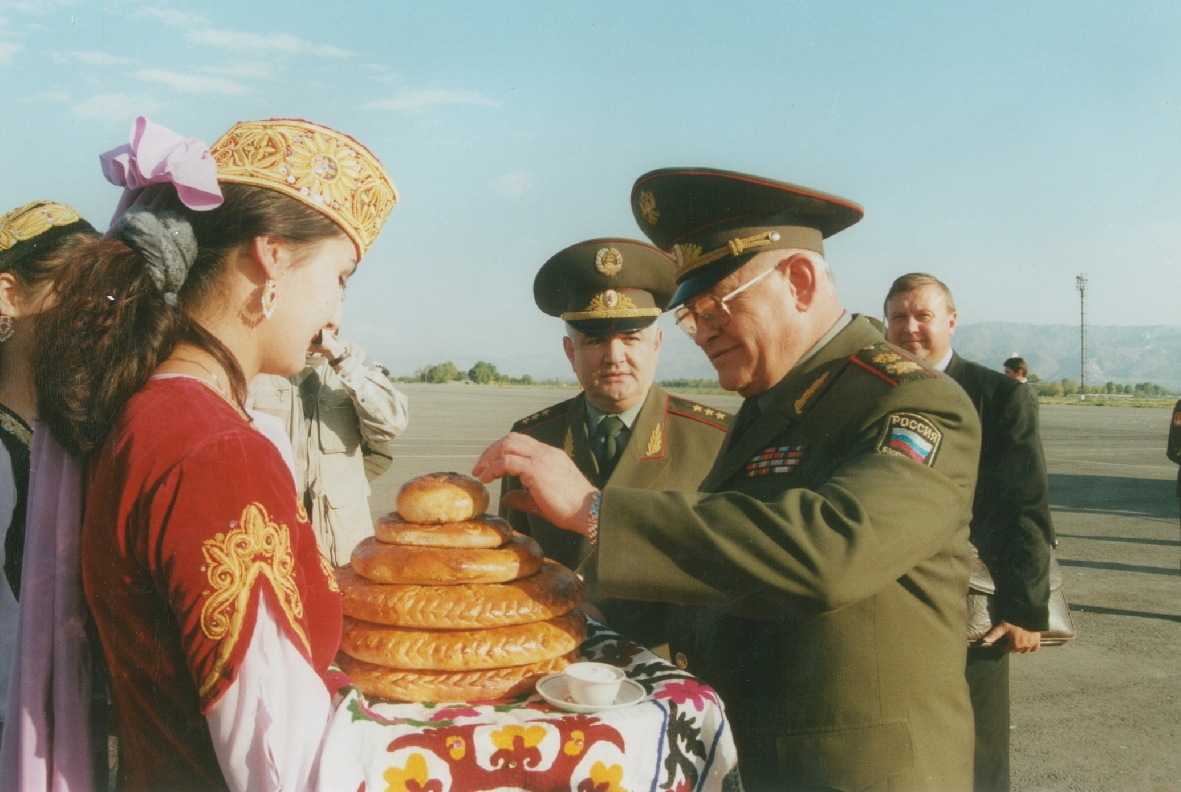
Sergeyev with Tajik Colonel General Sherali Khayrulloyev in Dushanbe.

In December 1999, Marshal Sergeyev called NATO enlargement, in and of itself, a threat to global and European collective security and world politics. He particularly stressed the deployment and use of NATO forces out of area without a United Nations or OSCE mandate as a threat that devalues confidence-building measures, arms control treaties and security.

Sergeyev was dismissed as defense minister in March 2001 and was replaced by Sergei Ivanov.

=== Death ===
Sergeyev died on 10 November 2006 from hemoblastosis. He was buried at the Troyekurovskoye Cemetery.

== Criticism ==
Marshal Sergeyev is blamed by some for not effectively acting during the War of Dagestan in 1999 but is also praised for the fact that the Russian military captured the Chechen capital Grozny in 2000 during the Second Chechen War. However, the ongoing fighting in the south of the country caused some concern about his efficacy after Vladimir Putin became president.

== Honours and awards ==
- Hero of the Russian Federation (27 October 1999)
- Order "For Merit to the Fatherland", 2nd class (28 March 2001)
- Order of Military Merit (1995)
- Order of Honour (20 April 2003)
- Order of the October Revolution (1987)
- Order of the Red Banner of Labour (1988)
- Order of the Red Star (1982)
- Order "For Service to the Homeland in the Armed Forces of the USSR", 3rd class (1976)
- Jubilee Medal "50 Years of the Armed Forces of the USSR"
- Jubilee Medal "60 Years of the Armed Forces of the USSR"
- Jubilee Medal "70 Years of the Armed Forces of the USSR"
- Medal "Veteran of the Armed Forces of the USSR"
- Medal of Zhukov
- Jubilee Medal "Twenty Years of Victory in the Great Patriotic War 1941–1945"
- Jubilee Medal "In Commemoration of the 100th Anniversary of the Birth of Vladimir Ilyich Lenin"
- Medal "In Commemoration of the 850th Anniversary of Moscow"
- Medal "For Impeccable Service" 1st, 2nd and 3rd classes
- Order of Manas, 3rd class (Kyrgyzstan, 20 December 1999)
- Order of the Yugoslav Star, 1st class (Yugoslavia, 23 December 1999)
- Order of Saint Righteous Grand Duke Dmitry Donskoy

== Legacy ==
In 2017, a street in the Kuntsevo District of Moscow was named after Marshal Sergeyev.

== See also ==
- List of Heroes of the Russian Federation

Political offices
Preceded by Igor Rodionov	Defence Minister of the Russian Federation; 1997–2001	Succeeded by Sergei Ivanov
Military offices
Preceded by Yuri Maksimov	Commander of the Strategic Rocket Forces; 1992–1997	Succeeded by Vladimir Yakovlev
