= 43rd Rocket Army =

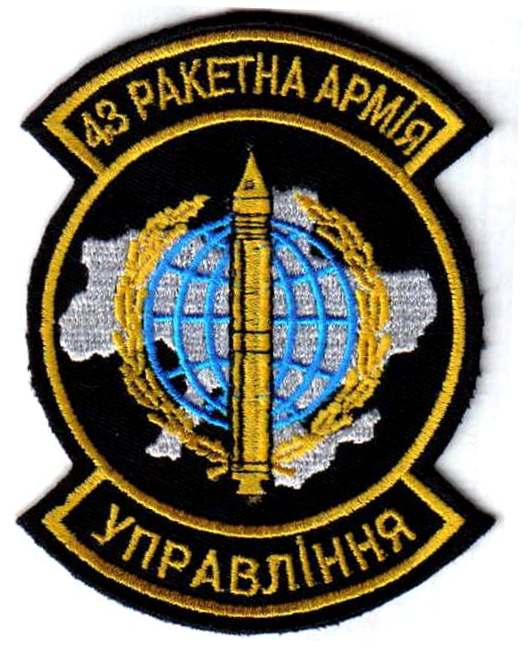
- Ukrainian patch of the 43rd Rocket Army
- Active: 1960–1996
- Country: Soviet Union (1960-1991); Ukraine (1991-1996)
- Branch: Soviet Strategic Missile Forces (1960-1991); Armed Forces of Ukraine (1991-1996)
- Type: Intercontinental Ballistic Missile
- Size: 6 missile / rocket divisions
- Garrison/HQ: Vinnytsia
- Decorations: Order of the Red Banner

Commanders
- Notable commanders: Alexander Shevtsov

The 43rd Red Banner Rocket Army, known officially as the 43rd Red Banner Missile Army, was an army of the Soviet Strategic Rocket Forces. It was formed in Vinnytsia from the 43rd Air Army of Long Range Aviation. In 1991, it came under the control of the Commonwealth of Independent States while stationed in Ukraine, and was dismantled by 1996. For much of its existence, it was headquartered in the city of Vinnytsia, in the then-Ukrainian SSR. It was among the first units in the Soviet Strategic Rocket Forces to field the UR-100 (SS-11 'Sego') and UR-100N (SS-19 'Stilleto') ICBMs.

== History ==
On 9 April 1946 8th Air Army was renamed 2nd Air Army DA, and transferred to Vinnytsia, Vinnytsia Oblast. In 1946 the 2nd Air Army DA comprised the 2nd Guards Bomber Aviation Corps (2nd and 13th Guards Bomber Aviation Divisions) and the 4th Guards Bomber Aviation Corps (14th and 15th Guards Bomber Aviation Divisions). On 10 January 1949 2nd Air Army DA was redesignated 43rd Air Army DA.

43rd Rocket Army was formed at Vinnytsia within the Kiev Military District's boundaries on 1 September 1960 from the previous 43rd Air Army of the Long Range Aviation.

In 1961 the 43rd Rocket Army comprised the 44th Rocket Division (Kolomiya, Ivano-Frankivsk Oblast, previously 73rd Engineer Brigade RVGK at Kamyshin), the 19th Rocket Division (Gaisin, Vinnitsa Oblast), the 50th Rocket Division (Belokorovichi, Zhitomir Oblast), the 46th Rocket Division (Pervomaisk, Mykolaiv Oblast, formed from 93rd Motor Rifle Division of the Ground Forces), 43rd Guards Rocket Division (Romny, Sumy Oblast), the 35th Rocket Division (Ordzhonikidze, North Ossetia), and the 37th Guards Rocket Division (Lutsk, Volyn Oblast).

On 19 March 1970, the 33rd Guards Rocket Division became part of the army. On 25 May 1972, the 60th Rocket Regiment transferred from control of the 19th Rocket Division to direct army subordination. The 434th Rocket Regiment also moved from the 46th Rocket Division to direct army subordination. On 25 May 1975, the army was awarded the Order of the Red Banner.

The 434th Rocket Regiment transferred to Olovyannaya and became part of the 47th Rocket Division there on 1 July 1979. On 12 December 1981, the 35th Rocket Division left the army and moved to Barnaul, becoming part of the 33rd Guards Rocket Army. On 15 October 1984, the 60th Separate Rocket Regiment became part of the 50th Rocket Division.

On 31 March 1990 the 44th Rocket Division at Kolomiya was disbanded. In June 1990 the 50th Rocket Army at Smolensk was disbanded, and its 32nd and 49th Guards Rocket Divisions were reassigned to the 43rd Rocket Army.

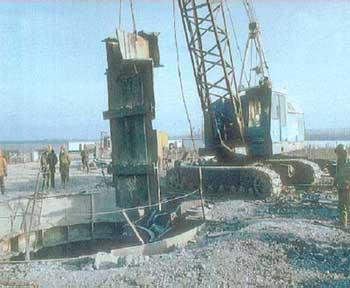
Workers destroying a SS-24 silo at Pervomaisk

Organisation 1990:

- 19th Rocket Division (Rakovo, Khmelnytskyi Oblast)
- 32nd Rocket Division (Postavy, Vitebsk Oblast)
- 33rd Guards Rocket Division (Mozyr, Gomel Oblast)
- 37th Guards Rocket Division (Lutsk, Volyn Oblast)
- 43rd Guards Rocket Division (Romny, Sumy Oblast)
- 46th Nizhnedneprovskaya (Lower Dnieper) Order of the October Revolution Red Banner Rocket Division (Pervomaisk, Mykolaiv Oblast)
- 49th Guards Rocket Division (Lida, Grodno Region, Belorussian SSR) - transferred to 27th Guards Rocket Army from March 1993.
- 50th Rocket Division (Belokorovichi, Zhitomir Oblast)
- 24th Arsenal GRAU (Military Unit Number 14247, A2365; Lviv-50), Mykhaylenky, Zhytomyr Oblast)

The 50th Rocket Division was disbanded 30.4.91, followed by the 43rd Guards Rocket Division 31 December 1992 and the 37th Guards Rocket Division 31 December 1993. On 6 December 1991, the army withdrew from the Strategic Missile Troops and became part of the Armed Forces of Ukraine. The dismantling of missile units began as barracks and other facilities were transferred to the Armed Forces of Ukraine. The missile warheads were sent to Russia. In March 1993, the 33rd Guards, 49th Guards and 32nd Rocket Divisions (all stationed in Belarus) were transferred to the 27th Guards Rocket Army. By 1995, only the 19th and 46th Rocket Divisions remained as part of the army. It was finally disbanded on 8 May 1996.

The 43rd Rocket Army's last commander was Colonel-General Vladimir Alekseevich Mikhtyuk, who served from 10.1.1991 to 8.5.1996.

In early 1994, after the Trilateral Agreement, "General Vitaly Radetskyi, Ukraine’s new Minister of Defence, summoned Mikhtyuk and two of his senior generals to Kyiv. Without warning, General Radetskyi told them they had 15 minutes to decide whether to take Ukraine’s oath of allegiance. General Mikhtyuk and one general took the oath, while the other refused. Then, the minister ordered [Mikhtyuk] to return to his headquarters in Vinnytsia immediately, and convene all of his subordinate commanders. ..He did so explaining his personal decision to remain in Ukraine, and asking each officer to take or reject the oath. “All of my deputies,” Mikhtyuk recalled, “except one, said they would not take the oath and asked me to transfer them to the Russian Federation."

"In March 1994, the 43rd Rocket Army had 18 operational regiments, manned by approximately 6,000 officers and warrant officers. By Ukrainian law, these officers would be retired with dismantlement of the rocket army. The Ukrainian government stated it would only be able to provide housing for 3,500 officers, which left 2,500 officers without housing."

"Leonid Kuchma’s government directed the Minister of Defence in 1994-1996 to keep the SS-24 [note: Soviet designation RT-23 Molodets] missiles on alert. General Mikhtyuk and the 43rd Rocket Army complied."

Russian sources say that the army was disestablished on 8 May 1996.

In either 1993 or May 1996, Colonel-General of the Armed Forces of Ukraine Mikhtyuk was appointed Deputy Minister of Defence of Ukraine - Commander of the 43rd Missile Army, to head the Interdepartmental Working Group overseeing the deactivation and destruction of strategic offensive weapons, стратегических наступательных вооружений (SHO).

"Major General Oleksander Iliashov commanded the 46th Rocket Division, which once had 5,500 men. Although by 1997 the rocket division was much reduced, General Iliashov directed his planning staff to organize and carry out the work of decommissioning the SS-24 complexes. General Mikhtyuk directed that the work begin in July 1998. It did, and over the next three years, 1998-2001, all 46 SS-24 missiles were decommissioned and removed from missile complexes by 43rd Army technicians and Ukrainian contractors."

On October 30, 2001, the last silo launcher (ШПУ) of the RT-23 Molodets intercontinental ballistic missile (according to U.S. Department of Defence classification - SS-24) in the 43rd Rocket Army was destroyed via an explosion.

"One infrastructure requirement.. was digging up and recovering the thousands of kilometers of underground cabling. These cables linked the missiles to regimental, division, army, and strategic rocket force command posts. The 43rd Rocket Army also had hundreds of kilometers of communications cables and wires, as well as power cables to each of the 130 missile complexes and 13 missile command posts. Bechtel was responsible for planning, organising and managing all work associated with eliminating these cables and electronic wires. The 43rd Rocket Army compiled annual statistics on cables recovered and metal scrap salvaged."

On August 20, 2002, after parting with the Battle Banner, the 43rd Rocket Army ceased to exist, and its commander, Colonel General of the Armed Forces of Ukraine Mikhtyuk, was dismissed from military service on the same day.

== Commanders ==
- Colonel-General of Aviation Georgy Nikolaevich Tupikov, 22.11.60 - 25.11.61
- Colonel-General Pavel Borisovich Dankevich, 25.11.61 - 7.7.62
- Colonel-General Aleksandr Grigorevich Shevtsov, 24.8.62 - 20.6.66
- Colonel-General Mikhail Grigorevich Grigorev, 20.6.66 - 25.4.68
- Colonel-General Aleksey Dmitrievich Melekhin, 25.4.68 - 15.7.74
- Colonel-General Yury Petrovich Zabegaylov, 15.7.74 - 18.12.75
- Colonel-General Vadim Serafimovich Nedelin, 18.12.75 - 15.8.82
- Colonel-General Aleksandr Petrovich Volkov, 15.8.82 - 22.7.87
- Lieutenant-General Valery Vasilevich Kirilin, 22.7.87 - 10.1.91
- Colonel-General Vladimir Alekseevich Mikhtyuk, began service January 1991, took the Ukrainian oath 1994.

== See also ==
- Nuclear weapons and Ukraine
