= 14th Rocket Division =

14th Kiev-Zhitomir Order of Kutuzov Rocket Division (1961–present) 201st Rocket Brigade (1960–1961)
- 14-я ракетная Киевско-Житомирская ордена Кутузова дивизия
- Active: 1960–present
- Country: Soviet Union (1960–1991); Russia (1991–present)
- Branch: Strategic Rocket Forces
- Part of: 27th Guards Rocket Army
- Garrison/HQ: Rechnoy, Mari El Republic
- Decorations: Order of Kutuzov

Commanders
- Current commander: Colonel Andrei A. Burbin

The 14th Kiev-Zhitomir Order of Kutuzov Rocket Division (Russian: 14-я ракетная Киевско-Житомирская ордена Кутузова дивизия) (Military Unit Number 34096) is a military formation of the Russian Strategic Rocket Forces. It is part of the 27th Guards Rocket Army. It is garrisoned in Rechnoy, Mari El Republic.

The unit operates RT-2PM Topol intercontinental ballistic missile launchers.

== History ==
In 1960 the 201st Rocket Brigade was formed from the 234th Artillery Brigade during the formation of the Strategic Rocket Forces. In 1961 the unit was renamed to the 14th Rocket Division.

== Commanders ==
Commanders of the 14th Rocket Division
No.	Name	From	To
1	Major General Dmitry D. Ageyev	4 August 1960	12 April 1963
2	Major General Anatoly A. Utrosin	12 April 1963	13 March 1969
3	Major General Anatoly A. Aleshkin	13 March 1969	2 June 1971
4	Major General Yuri A. Yashin	2 June 1971	19 April 1973
5	Major General Stanislav G. Kochemasov	19 April 1973	30 August 1976
6	Major General Gennady A. Kolesnikov	30 August 1976	8 July 1980
7	Major General Vyacheslav M. Sizov	8 July 1980	26 February 1985
8	Major General Anatoly N. Perminov	26 February 1985	14 November 1987
9	Major General Musa S. Tsechoyev	14 November 1987	30 December 1994
10	Major General Vladimir I. Shevtsov	30 December 1994	19 January 2004
11	Major General Mikhail G. Krasnov	19 January 2004	11 October 2007
12	Major General Sergei S. Ivanitsky	11 October 2007	29 October 2010
13	Major General Igor S. Afonin	29 October 2010	August 2013
14	Colonel Andrei A. Burbin	August 2013	present

== Structure ==
Structure of the unit as of 2000:

- 290th Rocket Regiment
- 697th Rocket Regiment
- 702nd Rocket Regiment
- 779th Rocket Regiment
