= Strategic Rocket Forces =

Separate-troops branch of the Russian Armed Forces

- Ракетные войска стратегического назначения Raketnye voyska strategicheskogo naznacheniya
- Emblem
- Founded: 17 December 1959; 66 years ago
- Country: Russia (1992–present); Commonwealth of Independent States (1991–1992); Soviet Union (1959–1991)
- Branch: Russian Armed Forces
- Type: Strategic missile force
- Role: Strategic missile deterrence
- Size: 50,000 personnel (2020)
- Headquarters: Vlasikha, 2.5 km northwest of Odintsovo, Moscow Oblast
- Motto: "После нас - тишина" ("After us - silence")
- March: Artillery March (Марш Артиллеристов) by Tikhon Khrennikov
- Anniversaries: 17 December
- Equipment: Ballistic missiles, cruise missiles
- Engagements: Cuban Missile Crisis; Able Archer 83; Norwegian rocket incident Russo-Ukrainian War
- Website: Official website

Commanders
- Supreme Commander-in-Chief: President Vladimir Putin
- Minister of Defense: Andrey Belousov
- Commander: Colonel General Sergey Karakayev
- Chief of Staff: Lieutenant General Igor Fazletdinov

Insignia
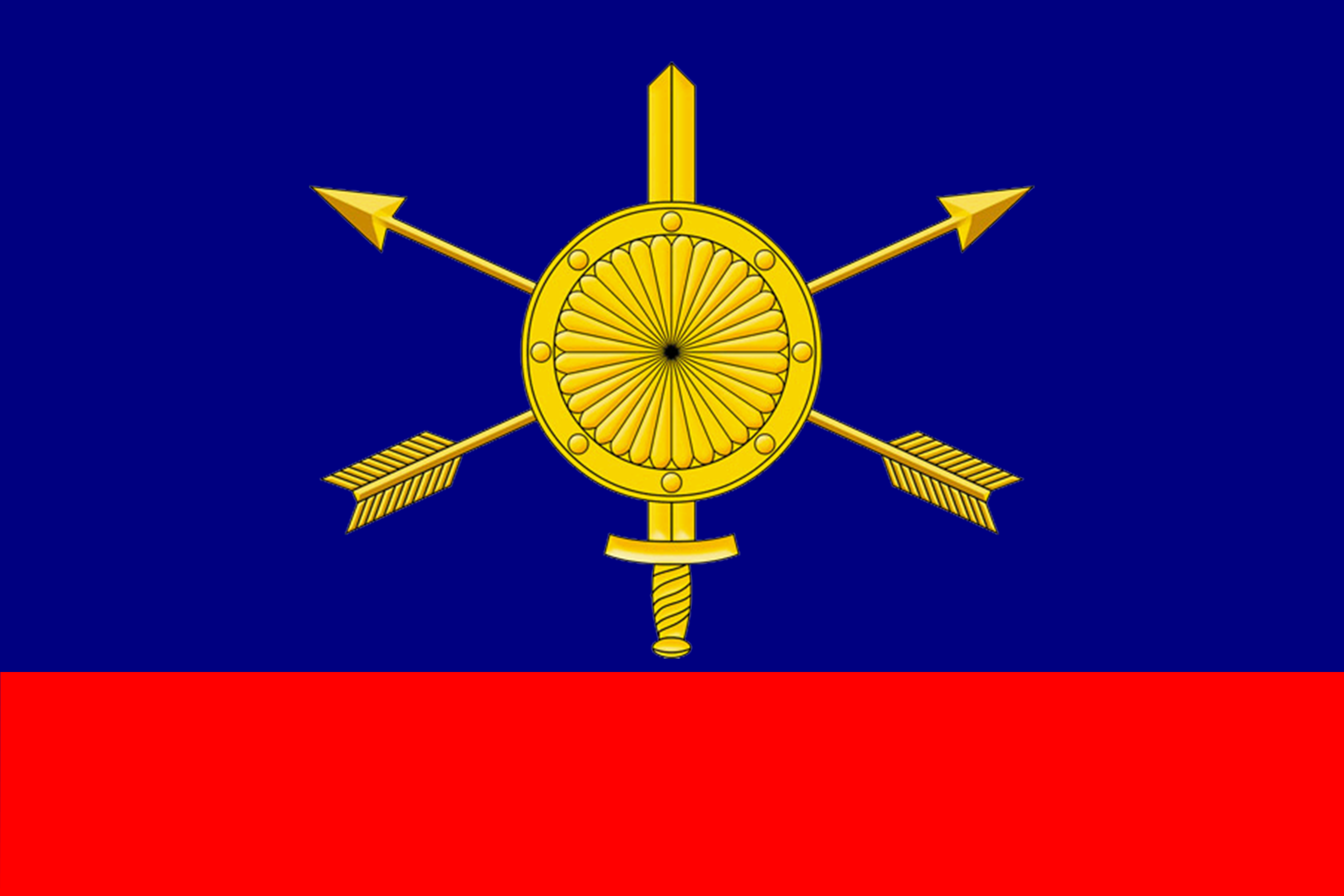
- Flag

- Patch

- Great Emblem

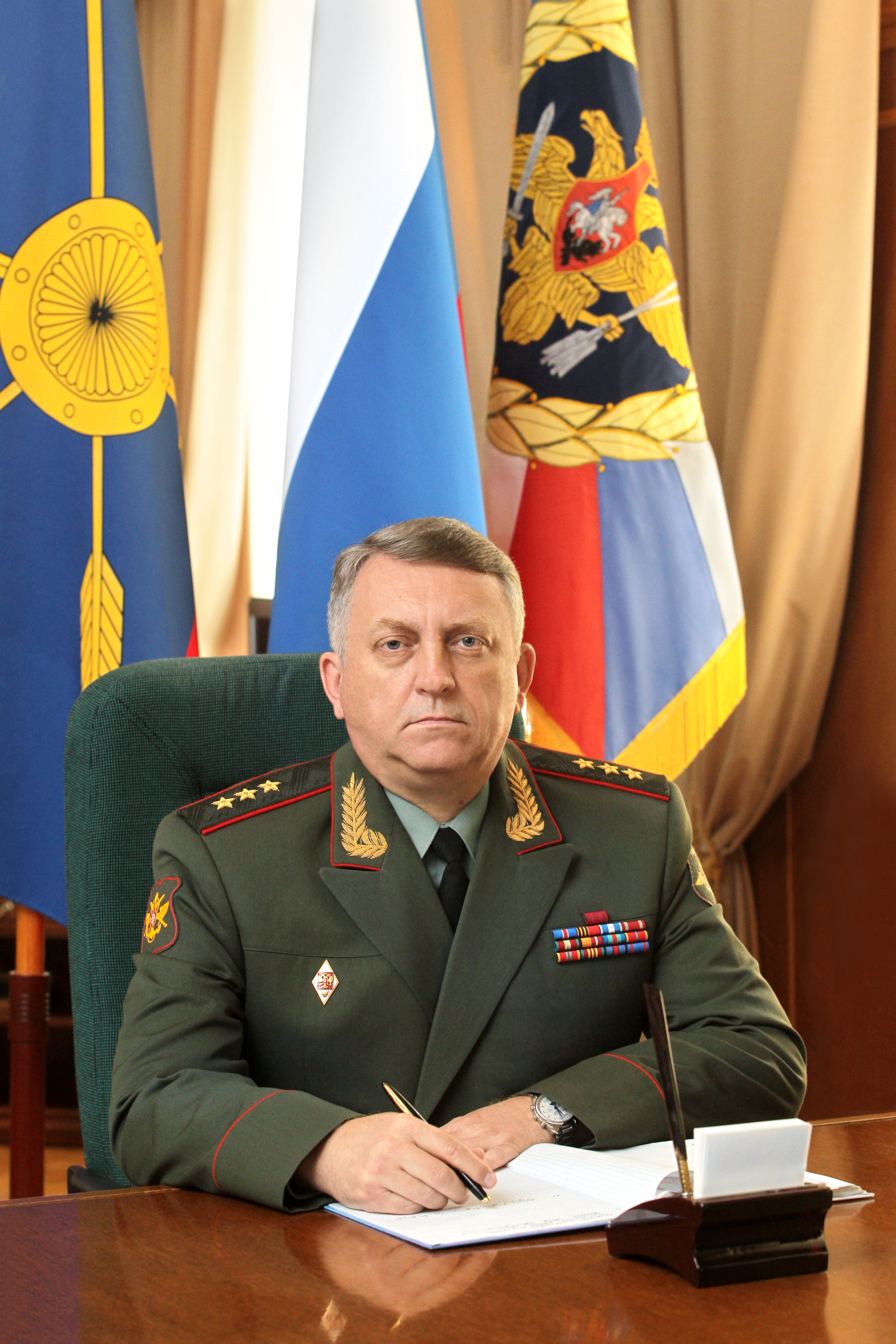
Sergei Karakayev (2015)

The Strategic Rocket Forces of the Russian Federation (Note: Also known as the Strategic Missile Forces of the Russian Federation.; Russian: Ракетные войска стратегического назначения Российской Федерации (РВСН РФ), romanized: Raketnye voyska strategicheskogo naznacheniya Rossiyskoy Federatsii, lit. 'Strategic Purpose Rocketry Troops of the Russian Federation'.) (RVSN RF) is a separate combat arm of the Russian Armed Forces that controls Russia's land-based intercontinental ballistic missiles (ICBMs). It was formerly part of the Soviet Armed Forces from 1959 to 1991.

The Strategic Rocket Forces was created on 17 December 1959 as part of the Soviet Armed Forces as the main force for operating all Soviet nuclear ground-based intercontinental, intermediate-range ballistic missile, and medium-range ballistic missile with ranges over 1,000 kilometers. After the Soviet Union collapsed in 1991, assets of the Strategic Rocket Forces were in the territories of several new states in addition to Russia, with armed nuclear missile silos in Belarus, Kazakhstan and Ukraine. On 8 December 1991 according to Belovezha Accords, which dissolved the Soviet Union, the other 3 nuclear member states transferred Soviet missiles on their territory to Russia and they all joined the Nuclear Non-Proliferation Treaty.

Complementary strategic forces within Russia include the Russian Aerospace Forces' Long Range Aviation and the Russian Navy's ballistic missile submarines. Together the three bodies form Russia's nuclear triad.

== History ==
The first Soviet rocket study unit was established in June 1946, by redesignating the 92nd Guards Mortar Regiment at Bad Berka in East Germany as the 22nd Brigade for Special Use of the Reserve of the Supreme High Command. On October 18, 1947, the brigade conducted the first launch of the remanufactured former German A-4 ballistic missile, or R-1, from the Kapustin Yar Range. In the early 1950s the 77th and 90th Brigades were formed to operate the R-1 (SS-1a 'Scunner'). The 54th and 56th Brigades were formed to conduct test launches of the R-2 (SS-2 'Sibling') at Kapustin Yar on June 1, 1952.

The 5th Scientific Research Proving Ground was established in 1955 in Kzyl-Orda Oblast at the town of Zarya later Leninsk, and finally in 1995 Baikonur. Also established that year was the 43rd Independent Scientific Experimental Station (Klyuchi, Kamchatka Krai) as an outstation of the Baikonur test site. Two years later "Object Angara" was formed at Plesetsk, Arkhangelsk Oblast, which after another name change in 1959 eventually became the 53rd Scientific Research Proving Ground in 1963.

From 1959 the Soviets introduced a number of intercontinental ballistic missiles (ICBMs) into service, including the R-7 (SS-6 'Sapwood'), the R-16 (SS-7 'Saddler'), the R-9 (SS-8 'Sasin'), the R-26 (given the NATO reporting name SS-8 'Sasin' due to incorrect identification as the R-9), the R-36 (SS-9 'Scarp'), and the RT-21 (SS-16 'Sinner'), which was possibly never made fully operational.

By 1990 all early types of missiles had been retired from service. In 1990, the Strategic Missile Forces were officially established as a service branch of the Armed Forces under the direct control of the Defense Ministry. The date of its formal foundation, December 17, is celebrated as Strategic Missile Forces Day.

Two rocket armies were formed in 1960. The 43rd Rocket Army and the 50th Rocket Army were formed from the previous 43rd and 50th Air Armies of the Long Range Aviation.

During a test of the R-16 ICBM on October 24, 1960, the test missile exploded on the pad, killing the first commander of the SRF, Chief Marshal of Artillery Mitrofan Ivanovich Nedelin. This disaster, the details of which were concealed for decades, became known as the Nedelin catastrophe. He was succeeded by Marshal of the Soviet Union Kirill Moskalenko who was in turn quickly succeeded by Marshal Sergey Biryuzov. Under Marshal Biryuzov the SRF deployed missiles to Cuba in 1962 as part of Operation Anadyr. 36 R-12 intermediate range ballistic missiles were sent to Cuba, initiating the Cuban Missile Crisis. The 43rd Guards Missile Division of 43rd Rocket Army manned the missiles while in Cuba.

Marshal Nikolai Krylov took over in March 1963 and served until February 1972. During this time French President Charles de Gaulle visited the Strategic Missile Forces in 1966. Together with NI Krylov, he visited a missile division in Novosibirsk, and then at the invitation of Leonid Brezhnev participated in a demonstration missile launch at the Baikonur Cosmodrome in the Kazakh SSR. Chief Marshal of Artillery Vladimir Fedorovich Tolubko commanded the SRF from April 12, 1972, to July 10, 1985. Tolubko emphasised raising the physical fitness standards within the SRF and in the late 1970s and early 1980s, the Strategic Rocket Forces began to field the new UR-100 (SS-11 'Sego') and UR-100N (SS-19 'Stilleto') ICBMs beginning with the 43rd Rocket Army in the Ukrainian SSR, providing them with longer range and more accurate missiles. He was succeeded by General of the Army Yury Pavlovich Maksimov, who was in command from July 10, 1985, to August 19, 1992.

According to a 1980 TIME Magazine article citing analysts from RAND Corporation, Soviet non-Slavs were generally barred from joining the Strategic Rocket Forces because of suspicions about the loyalty of ethnic minorities to the state. Those who served in the Strategic Rocket Forces had better quality of living, food and also higher salaries than the ones paid to those serving in the Soviet Army. The majority of new recruits has, since its inception, consisted of mainly college and university graduates.

In 1989 the Strategic Rocket Forces had over 1,400 ICBMs, 300 launch control centers, and twenty-eight missile bases. The RSVN operated RSD-10 (SS-20 'Saber') intermediate-range ballistic missiles (IRBMs) and R-12 (SS-4 'Sandal') medium-range ballistic missiles (MRBMs). Two-thirds of the road-mobile Soviet RSD-10 force was based in the western Soviet Union and was aimed at Western Europe.

One-third of the force was located east of the Ural Mountains and was targeted primarily against China. Older R-12 missiles were deployed at fixed sites in the western Soviet Union. The Intermediate-Range Nuclear Forces Treaty, signed in December 1987, called for the elimination of all 553 Soviet RSD-10 and R-12 missiles within three years. As of mid-1989, over 50% of RSD-10 and R-12 missiles had been eliminated.

By 1990 the Soviet Union had seven types of operational ICBMs. About 50% were heavy R-36M (SS-18 'Satan') and UR-100N (SS-19 'Stiletto') ICBMs, which carried 80% of the country's land-based ICBM warheads. By this time it was producing new mobile, and hence survivable ICBMs, the RT-23 (SS-24 'Scalpel') and RT-2PM (SS-25 'Sickle').

In 1990, with the R-12 apparently fully retired, the IISS reported that there were 350 UR-100s (SS-11 'Sego,' Mod 2/3), 60 RT-2s (SS-13 'Savage') still in service in one missile field, 75 UR-100MRs (SS-17 'Spanker,' Mod 3, with 4 MIRV), 308 R-36Ms (mostly Mod 4 with 10 MIRV), 320 UR-100Ns (mostly Mod 3 with 6 MIRV), some 60 RT-23s (silo and rail-mobile), and some 225 RT-2PMs (mobile).

Commanders of the Strategic Rocket Forces

| Rank | Commander | Start | End |
|---|---|---|---|
| Chief Marshal of Artillery | Mitrofan Ivanovich Nedelin | 17.12.1959 | 24.10.1960 |
| Marshal of the Soviet Union | Kirill Semenovich Moskalenko | 25.11.1960 | 24.4.1962 |
| Marshal of the Soviet Union | Sergey Semenovich Biryuzov | 24.4.1962 | 5.3.1963 |
| Marshal of the Soviet Union | Nikolay Ivanovich Krylov | 5.3.1963 | 9.2.1972 |
| Chief Marshal of Artillery | Vladimir Fedorovich Tolubko | 12.4.1972 | 10.7.1985 |
| General of the Army | Yury Pavlovich Maksimov | 10.7.1985 | 19.8.1992 |
| Marshal of the Russian Federation | Igor Dmitrievich Sergeev | 19.8.1992 | 22.5.1997 |
| General of the Army | Vladimir Nikolaevich Yakovlev | 6.1997 | 27.4.2001 |
| Colonel-General | Nikolay Evgenevich Solovtsov | 27.4.2001 | 3.8.2009 |
| Lieutenant-General | Andrey Anatolevich Shvaychenko | 3.8.09 | 22.6.2010 |
| Lieutenant-General | Sergey Viktorovich Karakaev | 22.6.2010 | |

Composition of the Strategic Missile Forces 1960–1991

| Formation | Headquarters Location | Year formed as Corps | Year formed as Army | Year disbanded | Divisions |
|---|---|---|---|---|---|
| 27th Guards Rocket Army | HQ Vladimir, Moscow Military District | Sept. 1, 1959 | 1970 | Still active | 7th Guards Rocket Division, 28th Guards Rocket Division, (32), 54th Guards Rocket Division, 60th Rocket Division |
| 31st Rocket Army | Orenburg, Urals Military District | Sept. 5, 1965 | 1970 | Still active | 8th, 13th, 14th, (41st Guards), 42nd, 50, 52nd, (55), 59 |
| 33rd Guards Rocket Army | Omsk, Siberian Military District | 1962 | 1970 | Still active | 23, (34), 35th, 36th Guards, 38, 39th Guards, 57, 62 |
| 43rd Rocket Army | Vinnitsa, Kiev Military District | — | 1960 | May 8, 1996 | 19 (Khmelnitsky), 37th Guards (Lutsk), 43 (Kremenchug), 44 (Kolomyia, Ivano-Frankovsk Oblast, disbanded March 1990; 46 (Pervomaisk, Mykolaiv Oblast) |
| 50th Rocket Army | Smolensk, Belorussian Military District | — | 1960 | June 30, 1990 | 1988: 7th Guards, 24th Guards (Gvardeysk, Kaliningrad Oblast), 31st Guards (former 83rd Guards Bryansko-Berlinskaya Aviation (Missile) Division, renumbered July 1, 1960), 32nd (Postavy, Vitebsk Oblast), 40th, 49th Guards (Lida, Grodno Region, 1963 to 1990), 58th (Karmelava, Lithuania) |
| 53rd Rocket Army | Chita, Transbaikal Military District | 1962 | June 8, 1970 | Sept. 16, 2002 | 1988: 4th Rocket Division (Drovyanaya, Chita Oblast), 23rd Guards Rocket Division (Kansk, assigned 1983–2002), 27th Rocket Division (Svobodnyy, Amur Oblast), 29th, 36th Guards, 47th Rocket Division (Olovyannaya, Chita Oblast) |

RSVN training establishments included:

- the Peter the Great Military Academy of the Strategic Missile Forces in Moscow;
- the Military Engineering Red Banner Institute named after A.F. Mozhayskiy (VIKI) in Leningrad;
- the Kharkov Higher Military Command Engineering School Missile Forces named after Marshal of the Soviet Union N.I. Krylov
- the Krasnodar Higher Military Command Engineering School Missile Forces (KVVKIU) (1982–1998)
- the Perm Higher Military Command Engineering Red Banner School Missile Forces (ru:Пермский военный институт ракетных войск)
- the Riga Higher Military Political Red Banner School named after Marshal of the Soviet Union S.S. Biryuzov (under the SRF from 1959 to 1993)
- the Rostov Higher Military Command Engineering School Missile Forces (RVVKIU) (1959 onwards)
- the Saratov Higher Military Command and Engineering School of Missile Forces (1959–2003 & 2024 onwards)
- the Serpukhov Higher Military Command Engineering School Missile Forces named after the Leninskiy Komsomol (SVVKU)

=== Post Soviet Union ===
Like most of the Russian Armed Forces, the Strategic Missile Forces had limited access to resources for new equipment in the Yeltsin era. However, the Russian government made a priority of ensuring that the Missile Forces received new missiles to phase out older, less-reliable systems, and to incorporate newer capabilities in the face of international threats to the viability of the nuclear deterrent effect provided by their missiles. In particular the development of missile defense systems in the United States.

In 1995, the "Strategic Missile Forces Day" and "Military Space Forces Day" were created. On July 16, 1997, President Boris Yeltsin signed a decree incorporating the Russian Space Forces and the Space Missile Defence Forces (Russian: Ракетно-космической обороны) into the SMT. In doing so, 'nearly 60' military units and establishments were dissolved. However, four years later, on June 1, 2001, the Russian Space Forces were reformed as a separate branch of service from the SMT.

Minister of Defence Marshal of the Russian Federation Igor Sergeev, a former commander of the SMT from August 19, 1992 – May 22, 1997, played a major role in assuring funding for his former service. He was succeeded by General of the Army Vladimir Yakovlev, who commanded the SMT from June 1997 until April 27, 2001. Yakovlev was succeeded by Colonel General Nikolay Solovtsov.

In the early 2000s, Chief of the General Staff Army General Anatoly Kvashnin decided to downgrade the status of the Strategic Missile Forces from a branch of the armed forces to an independent combat arm. This was completed despite the opposition of Defense Minister Marshal Igor Sergeyev.

Solovtsov was dismissed in July–August 2009. Speculation over why Solovtsov was dismissed included opposition to further cuts in deployed nuclear ballistic missile warheads below the April 2009 figure of 1,500, the fact that he had reached the retirement age of 60, despite that he had recently been extended another year's service, or the failure of the Navy's Bulava missile).

After only a year, Lieutenant General Andrey Shvaichenko, appointed on August 3, 2009, by President Dmitry Medvedev, was replaced. The current commander of the Strategic Missile Forces, Colonel General Sergey Karakayev, was appointed to the post by a presidential decree of June 22, 2010.

The RVSN headquarters has a special sledgehammer that can be used to gain access to the launch codes if the commander feels the need to use it or if ordered directly, but does not have normal access to the safe. In 2020, the Strategic Missile Forces completed switching to digital information transmission technology.

== Composition ==
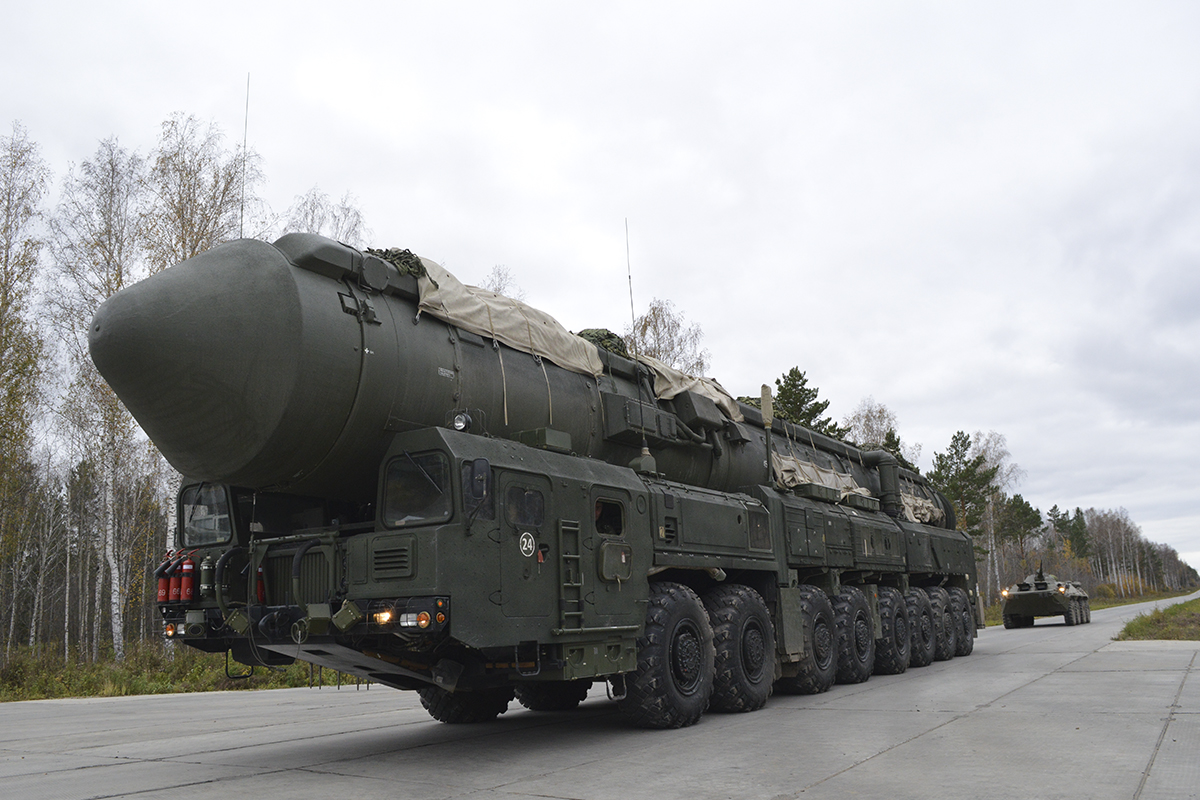
A RS-24 Yars missile system of the 39th Guards Missile Division during a command post exercise in 2017.

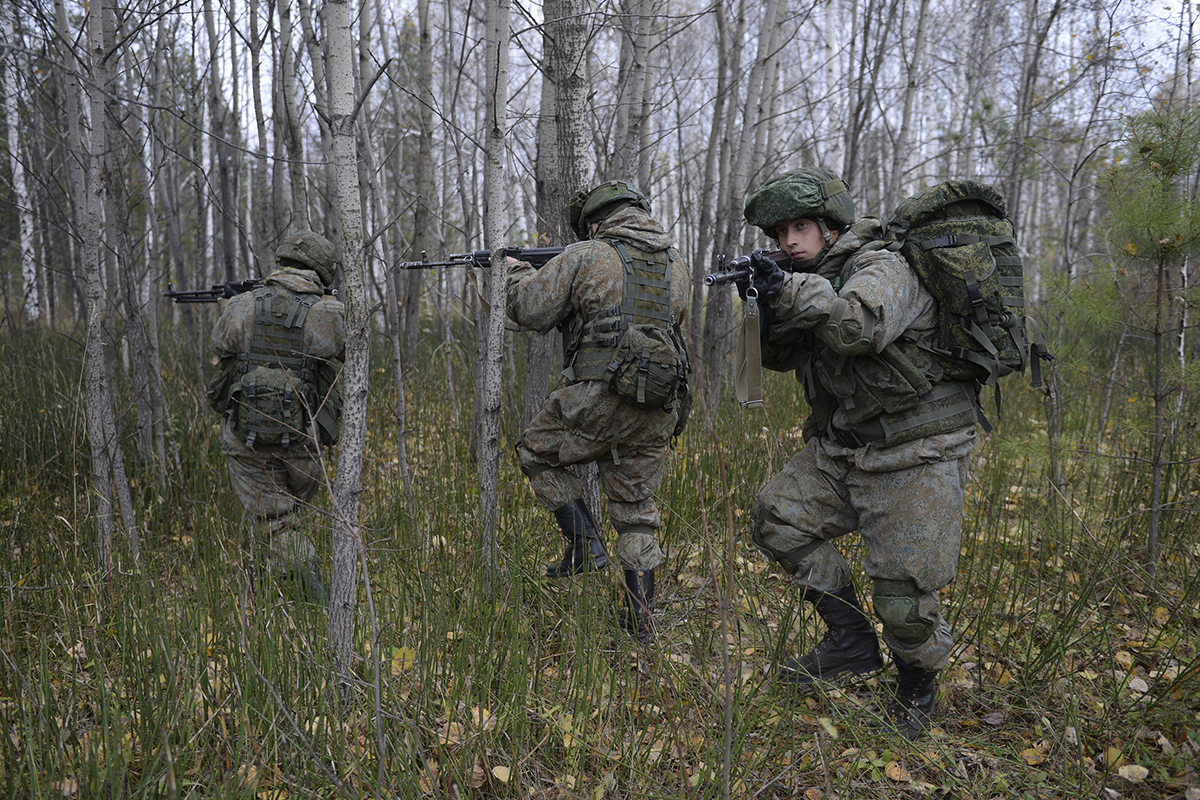
Strategic Rocket Forces infantry during a military exercise.

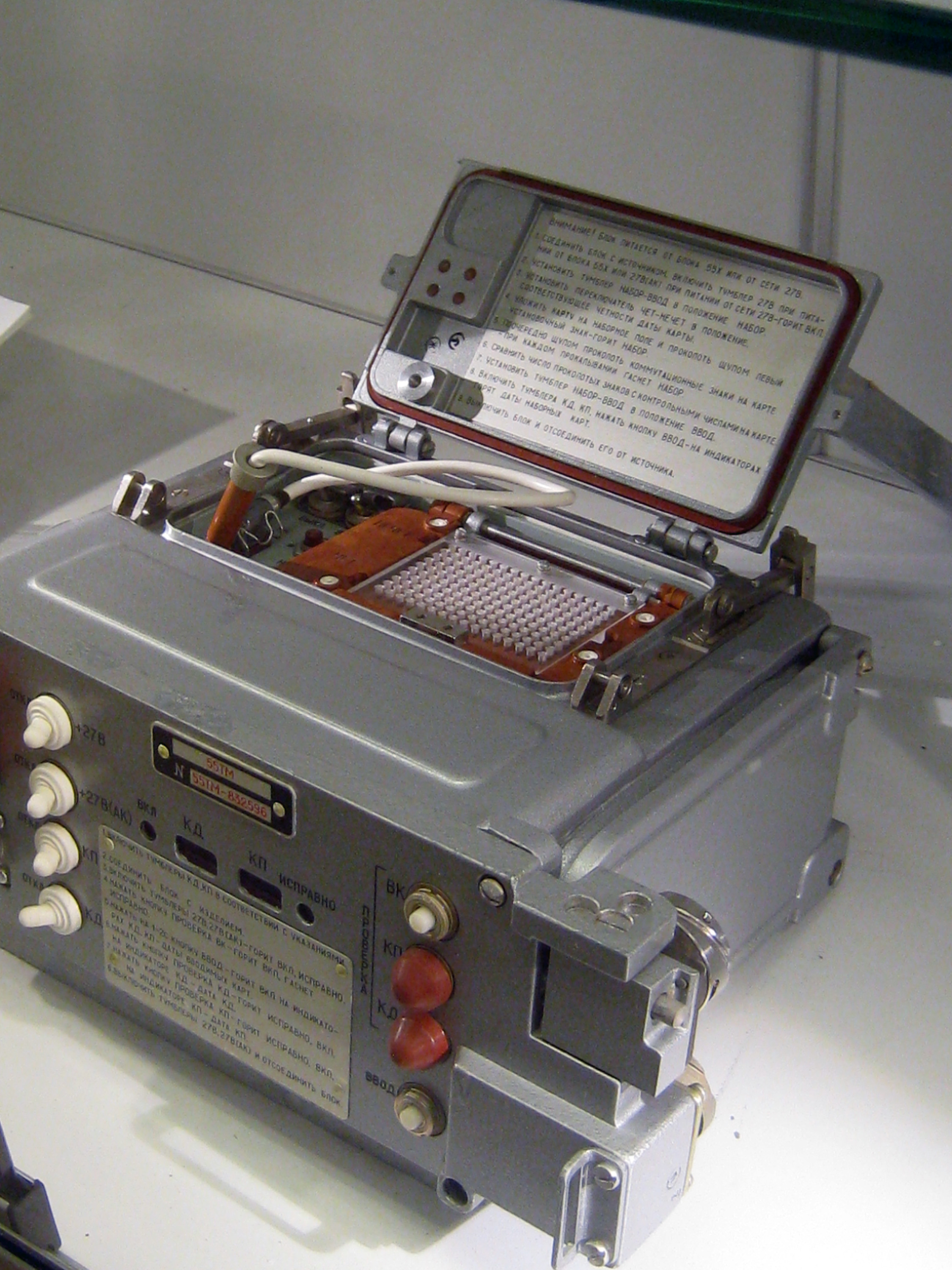
A launch authorization device

The main RVSN command post is at Kuntsevo in the suburbs of Moscow. The alternate command post is at Kosvinsky Mountain in the Urals.

Female cadets have started to join the Peter the Great Strategic Rocket Forces Academy. In the past, only men were allowed to serve in the Missile Forces. RVSN institutes also exist at Serpukhov and Rostov-on-Don. An ICBM test impact range is located in the Far East, the Kura Test Range. This has been under Aerospace Defence Forces' command since 2010.

The Strategic Missile Forces operate four distinct missile systems. The oldest system is the silo-based R-36M2 / SS-18 Satan. It carries ten warheads. The last missile will be in service until 2020.

The second system is the silo-based UR-100NUTTH / SS-19 Stiletto. The last Stiletto missiles in service with six warheads each will be removed by 2019. Two UR-100NUTTH missiles are still believed to be active with Avangard HGVs as of 2024.

A new missile entering service is the RT-2UTTH Topol-M / SS-27 Sickle B with single warhead, of which 60 are silo-based and 18 are mobile. Some new missiles will be added in the future. The first upgraded Topol-M called RS-24 Yars, carrying three warheads, was commissioned in 2010. In July 2011 the first mobile regiment with nine missiles was completed. From 2012 to 2017, about 80 ICBMs were placed in active duty. The RF Defense Minister said in December 2022 that 91.3% of the country's nuclear forces was modern. 3 missile regiments rearmed in 2023. According to the RF MoD, the new super-heavy ICBM RS-28 Sarmat has entered service, it's designed to replace the aging R-36. A new IRBM named Oreshnik was launched at Dnipro, Ukraine in 2024. The Chief of the Russian Armed Forces General Staff said in December 2025 that 92% of the country's Strategic Missile Forces was equipped with modern weapons.

=== Units ===
The composition of the Strategic Rocket Forces was formerly disclosed through START I and later New START treaty data exchanges. New START expired in early February 2026, ending declared launcher and warhead reporting, although Russia stated it would continue to observe the treaty's central limits in the near term. The order of battle below reflects estimates published in May 2026.

- 27th Guards Rocket Army (Military Unit No. 43176) (HQ: Vladimir)
  - 98th Mixed Aviation Squadron
  - 7th Guards Rocket Division (Military Unit No. 14245) at Vypolzovo with mobile RS-24 Yars
  - 14th Rocket Division (Military Unit No. 34096) at Yoshkar-Ola with mobile RS-24 Yars
  - 28th Guards Rocket Division (Military Unit No. 54055) at Kozelsk with silo-based RS-24 Yars; rearmament of the division was reported complete in December 2025
  - 54th Guards Rocket Division (Military Unit No. 34048) at Teykovo with 18 mobile RT-2UTTH Topol-M and mobile RS-24 Yars; rearmament of one mobile regiment with Yars began in 2025
  - 60th Rocket Division (Military Unit No. 89553) at Tatishchevo with 50 silo-based RT-2UTTH Topol-M, being progressively replaced by silo-based RS-24 Yars from December 2025; the 165th Missile Regiment has been disarmed of Topol-M pending rearmament
- 31st Rocket Army (HQ: Orenburg)
  - 102nd Mixed Aviation Squadron
  - 8th Rocket Division at Pervomaysky, which also operates three Sirena-M back-up launch-code transmitter systems that carry no warheads
  - 13th Red Banner Rocket Division at Dombarovskiy with silo-based R-36M2 and 12 UR-100NUTTH carrying Avangard hypersonic glide vehicles
  - 42nd Rocket Division at Nizhniy Tagil with mobile RS-24 Yars
- 33rd Guards Rocket Army (HQ: Omsk)
  - 105th Mixed Aviation Squadron
  - 29th Guards Rocket Division at Irkutsk with mobile RS-24 Yars
  - 35th Rocket Division at Barnaul with mobile RS-24 Yars
  - 39th Guards Rocket Division at Novosibirsk with mobile RS-24 Yars
  - 62nd Rocket Division at Uzhur with silo-based R-36M2; six silos are being modified to receive the RS-28 Sarmat, with a reported eventual programme of 46 missiles

As of March 2026, the Strategic Rocket Forces were estimated to field 327 ICBM launchers, of which 324 carry nuclear weapons, with approximately 1,092 warheads assigned to them and about 892 of those actually deployed:

- 40 silo-based R-36M2 Voevoda (SS-18), each able to carry up to 10 warheads, divided between Dombarovskiy and Uzhur
- 12 silo-based UR-100NUTTKh (SS-19 Mod 4) each carrying one Avangard hypersonic glide vehicle
- 50 silo-based and 18 mobile RT-2UTTH Topol-M (SS-27 Mod 1), single-warhead
- 24 silo-based and 180 mobile RS-24 Yars (SS-27 Mod 2), estimated to carry three warheads each

== Weapons and equipment ==
=== Intermediate-range ballistic missiles ===
- 9M729 Oreshnik – In service from 2024 to present.
- RS-26 Rubezh

=== Intercontinental-range ballistic missiles ===
- RS-28 Sarmat, SS-X-29 Satan II – In service from 2023 to present.
- R-36M2 Voevoda, SS-18 Satan – In service from 1988 to present.
- RS-24 Yars, SS-29 – In service from 2010 to present.
- RT-2PM2 Topol-M, SS-27 Sickle-B – In service from 2000 to present.
- UR-100N - In service from 1975.

== Ranks and rank insignia ==
Officer ranks

| Rank group | General / flag officers | | | | | Senior officers | | | Junior officers |
|---|---|---|---|---|---|---|---|---|---|---|---|---|
| Russian Strategic Rocket Forces |
| Russian Strategic Rocket Forces | Маршал Российской Федерации; Marshal Rossiyskoy Federatsii | Генерал армии General armii | Генерал-полковник; General-polkovnik | Генерал-лейтенант; General-leytenant | Генерал-майор; General-mayor | Полковник; Polkovnik | Подполковник; Podpolkovnik | Майор; Mayor | Kапитан; Kapitan | Старший лейтенант Starshiy leytenant | Лейтенант; Leytenant | Mладший лейтенант Mladshiy leytenant |

Other ranks

| Rank group | Under-officers | | NCOs | | | | Enlisted |
|---|---|---|---|---|---|---|---|---|
| Russian Strategic Rocket Forces |
| Russian Strategic Rocket Forces | Ста́рший пра́порщик Stárshiy práporshchik | Пра́порщик; Práporshchyk | Старшина́ Starshyná | Ста́рший сержа́нт Stárshiy serzhánt | Сержа́нт; Serzhánt | Мла́дший сержа́нт Mládshiy serzhánt | Ефре́йтор; Efréĭtor | Рядово́й; Ryadovóy |

== Future ==
According to the Federation of American Scientists, for the foreseeable future, all new Russian ICBM deployments will be based on the MIRVed version of the solid-fueled Topol-M "RS-24 Yars" and the liquid-fueled RS-28 Sarmat. By the late 2020s, according to announcements by Russian military officials, all R-36M2 missiles will be retired in favor of the new RS-28 super-heavy ICBM.

== See also ==
- Dead Hand
- Russian Aerospace Defence Forces
- Awards and emblems of the Ministry of Defence of the Russian Federation
- List of states with nuclear weapons
