= 54th Guards Rocket Division =

54th Guards Order of Kutuzov Rocket Division
- Active: 25 June 1960 – present
- Country: Soviet Union (1960–91); Russia (since 1991)
- Branch: Strategic Rocket Forces
- Type: Missile division
- Part of: 27th Guards Missile Army
- HQ location: Teykovo, Ivanovo Oblast
- Decorations: Order of Kutuzov

Commanders
- Current commander: Colonel Oleg L. Glazunov

54th Guards Order of Kutuzov Rocket Division (Russian: 54-я гвардейская ордена Кутузова ракетная дивизия) is a strategic rocket division under command of the 27th Guards Missile Army of the Strategic Rocket Forces of Russia headquartered at Teykovo in Ivanovo Oblast. Its Military Unit Number is 34048.

== History ==
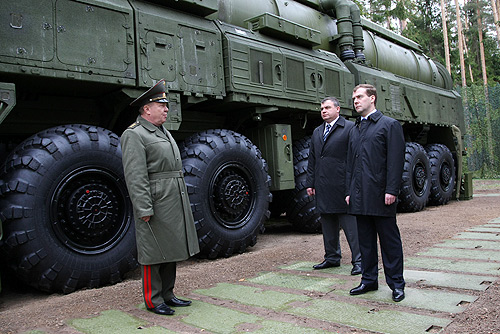
Dmitry Medvedev at the 54th Division with Topol-M in the background

The 197th Rocket Engineer Brigade was formed on 20 June 1960 on the basis of the 27th Separate Guards Artillery Brigade. It was initially under the 46th Artillery Range Administration, but from 3 October fell under the 3rd Independent Guards Missile Corps. It comprised the 594th, 602nd, 604th, and 621st Rocket Regiments. In May 1961 the brigade was reorganized into the 54th Guards Order of Kutuzov Missile Division with headquarters in the small town of Teykovo.

Since 1961, the 54th Division has performed 36 training launches.

On 27 November 1999 one of the regiments within the 54th Division received the honorific "Ivanovo".

In December 2006, the 54th Division became the first one to receive a mobile version of the RT-2PM2 (SS-27) missile.

In 2010, the 54th Division became the first unit to receive the RS-24 missile.

== Commanders ==
The following officers commanded the division.

- 1960–1965: Major General Boris E. Zbraylov
- 1965–1969: Major General Anatoly V. Leshin
- 1969–1974: Major General Vladimir P. Shilovsky
- 1974–1976: Major General Igor B. Urlin
- 1976–1983: Major General Ivan I. Oleynik
- 1983–1987: Major General Fedor A. Byakin
- 1987–1992: Major General Viktor P. Cherenov
- 1992–1994: Major General Vasili S. Rudenko
- 1994–1997: Major General Leonid E. Sinyakovich
- 1997–1999: Major General Pavel A. Chistopolsky
- 1999–2007: Major General Yuri A. Pchelintsev
- 2007–2010: Colonel Igor R. Fazletdinov
- Since September 2010: Colonel Oleg L. Glazunov

== Equipment ==
- 1962–1977: R-16U;
- 1968–1975: UR-100;
- 1971–1991: UR-100K;
- Since 1988: RT-2PM;
- Since 10 December 2006: RT-2PM.
- Since 2009: RS-24

== Structure ==
Structure of the unit as of 2015:

- 235th Rocket Regiment
- 285th Rocket Regiment
- 321st Rocket Regiment
- 773rd Rocket Regiment
