= 46th Rocket Division =

188th Rifle Division (1941–1946; 1953–1955) 52nd Rifle Brigade (1946–1953) 20th Rifle Division (IV) (1955–1957) 93rd Motor Rifle Division (1957–1959) 29th Rocket Brigade (1960–1961) 46th Rocket Division (1961–2002)
- Active: 1941–2002
- Country: Soviet Union (1941–1991); Ukraine (1991–2002)
- Branch: Soviet Army (1941–1959) Strategic Rocket Forces (1960–1991) Armed Forces of Ukraine (1991–2002)
- Type: Infantry (former), Inter-Continental Ballistic Missile
- Garrison/HQ: Pervomaisk
- Engagements: World War II: Baltic Operation; Leningrad Strategic Defensive; Demyansk Pocket; Battle of the Dnieper; Dnieper–Carpathian Offensive; Second Jassy–Kishinev Offensive
- Decorations: Order of the Red Banner; Order of the October Revolution
- Battle honours: Lower Dnieper

The 46th Nizhnedneprovskaya (Lower Dnieper) Order of the October Revolution Red Banner Rocket Division / Missile Division (Military Unit 33883) was a division of the Soviet Strategic Rocket Forces, active from 1961–62 to 1992 under the Soviet Union, and from 1992 to 2002 as part of Ukraine. The division traced its history back to the 188th Rifle Division, formed in Kaunas in spring 1941. The division fought in the Battle of the Dnieper, for which it was awarded the honorific "Lower Dnieper". After the Second Jassy–Kishinev Offensive it garrisoned Sliven in Bulgaria. At some point it moved to Pervomaisk in the then-Ukrainian SSR and became the 20th Rifle Division in 1955. In 1957, it became the 93rd Motor Rifle Division and was disbanded in 1959. In 1960, the 29th Rocket Brigade was formed in Pervomaisk and became the 46th Rocket Division in 1960. The 46th Rocket Division inherited the honors and awards of the 188th Rifle Division. After the dissolution of the Soviet Union, the division became part of Ukrainian military and was disbanded by 2002.

== History ==
=== World War II ===
The history of the 46th Rocket Division starts from April 29, 1941, when the formation of the 188th Rifle Division was completed in Kaunas. With 29th Rifle Corps of 11th Army on 22.6.41. Fought in central Russia and Ukraine. It was with the 82nd Rifle Corps of the 37th Army in Bulgaria in May 1945. The division played a part in the liberation of Ukraine and Moldova. The division's soldiers showed heroism and courage, and three soldiers were awarded the Hero of the Soviet Union, and more than 7000 were awarded military orders and medals.

For successful operations in the breakout through heavily fortified German defenses in the area north-east of the city of Krivoy Rog, the crossing of the Dnieper, and the liberation of the Lower Dnieper, the division on the order of the Supreme Commander on 17 February 1944 was awarded the honorary title "Nizhnedneprovskiy".

For exceptional Service to the Motherland in the Great Patriotic War, particularly distinguishing themselves in the battles for the liberation of Krivoi Rog, the division in February 1944 was awarded the Order of the Red Banner.

=== Cold War ===
It became the 52nd Rifle Brigade postwar at Zaporizhia with the 82nd Rifle Corps in the summer of 1946. In October 1953, it was upgraded to a division again.

The division appears to trace its history through its 1955 redesignation as the 20th Rifle Division and later the 93rd Motor Rifle Division (1957–59). On 17 May 1957, it became the 93rd Motor Rifle Division, part of the 25th Army Corps. The division included the 11th, 27th and 38th Motor Rifle Regiments, the 352nd Tank Regiment and other units. The division disbanded on 1 March 1959.

In May 1960, the division was reactivated and redesigned the 29th Rocket Brigade as part of the 43rd Rocket Army. It was commanded by Colonel Ivan Khomenko. In 1961, it was composed of the 62nd, 84th and 434th Missile Regiments. The 434th was stationed at Pervomaisk and equipped with R-14 Chusovaya theatre ballistic missiles. The 84th was at Simferopol and had R-5M missiles. The 62nd was at Balta and had SS-4 Sandal theater ballistic missiles.

The division became part of the Strategic Missile Forces in 1961. On April 29, 1961, on the basis of the 29th Rocket Brigade control (of Pervomaisk) was formed the headquarters of the 46th missile, Nizhnedneprovskiy, Red Banner Division. In 1962, it inherited the awards and honorary titles of the 93rd MRD and thus became the "Nizhnedneprovskaya Red Banner" Division.

One of the commanders of the division, appointed in 1991, was general-mayor Mikhail Filatov.

In 1991 it comprised the 62nd, 309th, 83rd, 115th, 116th, 355th, 593rd, 546th, and 552nd Rocket Regiments. In the 1994–97 period all the regiments were first de-alerted, and then from 1997 to 2002, disbanded. Forty RS-22 missiles were removed from their silos; 30 silos were eliminated; storage facilities for the RS-22s were built at the 24th Arsenal GRAU (Military Unit Number 14247, A2365; Lviv-50 facility), p. Mykhaylenky, Zhytomyr region); warehouses at Pervomaisk were used for storage of the missiles; and 20 silos were remodelled.

== Organization 1941 ==
Structure in 1941:

- Headquarters
- 523rd Rifle Regiment
- 580th Rifle Regiment
- 595th Rifle Regiment
- 234th Light Artillery Regiment
- 228th Howitzer Artillery Regiment
- 9th Anti-Tank Battalion
- 260th Reconnaissance Battalion
- 352nd Engineer Battalion
- 557th Signal Battalion
- 25th Medical Battalion
- 141st Supply Battalion
- 18th Chemical Defense Company

== Organization 1961 ==
Structure in 1961:

Three missile regiments with a total of 22 missiles

- Headquarters
- 434th Missile Regiment, Pervomaisk, Mykolaiv Oblast, six R-14U (SS-5 'Skean') missiles
- 84th Missile Regiment, Simferopol, Crimea Oblast, eight R-5M (SS-3 'Shyster) missiles
- 62nd Red Banner Missile Regiment, Balta, Odesa Oblast, eight R-12 (SS-4 'Sandal') missiles
- 107th Independent Helicopter Squadron
- 117th Repair-Technical Base (attached to 84th Missile Regiment)
- 1510th Repair-Technical Base (attached to 434th Missile Regiment)
- 1805th Repair-Technical Base (attached to 62nd missile regiment, control transferred to 46th Missile Division in 1968)

On May 30, 1961, the unit was renamed the 46th Missile Division, obtaining the honors and awards from the 93rd Motorised Rifle Division. From June 1962, the 309th Missile Regiment was assigned to the division. In 1967 it was decided to rearm the division with the newer UR-100, and the first silo construction took place in 1968 in the Pervomaisk region. The new silos were hardened and made of concrete and steel, and made to survive a direct nuclear strike, which gave the unit's missile facilities greater survivability, whereas the previous missile systems could only be launched from above-ground and were highly vulnerable. [US designation: Pervomaysk ICBM complex - Type IIID silo]. Initially it consisted of 60 silos, but by 1970 it expanded to 90 silos. Also, in 1972 the 434th Missile Regiment became independent and was directly attached to the 43rd Rocket Army (Missile Army). In 1973 and 1974, three more regiments (the 115th, 116th and 355th Missile Regiments) became operational and were assigned to the division. They were among the first units in the Soviet Strategic Rocket Forces to field the new UR-100U (SS-11 Mod 4) ICBM, which carried a single 1 megaton nuclear warhead and a range of 6,586 miles. Between 1973 and 1975, the division converted to the more accurate and improved UR-100N (SS-11 'Stiletto') ICBM. The initials 'BRK' (in the following sections) appear to stand for 'launch group' (similar to how American Minuteman missile wings were internally organized). Each Regiment (roughly equivalent to a flight) controlled ten missile launch sites. On January 21, 1978, the division was awarded the Order of the October Revolution, becoming the 6th Nizhnedneprovskaya (Lower Dnieper) Order of the October Revolution Red Banner Rocket Division (Missile Division).

== Aviation ==
Each regiment had around three aviation squadrons, usually with either just helicopters or both helicopter and transport aircraft, known as Mixed Aviation. A squadron would normally control 12 aircraft or helicopters, while an aviation component would control about 6. Helicopters used included:

Mi-1 and Mi-4 (1960s)

Mi-2 and Mi-8 (1970s-present)

Mi-6, Mi-9, Mi-17 and some Mi-24 variants (rarely used)

== Repair-Technical Base ==
Repair-Technical Base (Russian; Ремонтно-технические базы, in short, РТБ) refers to units that control the nuclear warheads within a missile division, brigade or regiment. All of them were (and the ones that still exist in Russia are) subordinate to the 12th Main Directorate of the Ministry of Defense. Repair-Technical bases consist of specialized personnel and are the size of a battalion when attached to a regiment and the size of a regiment when attached to a division. Their duties include the maintenance, storage, transport, handling and security of nuclear warheads, stored in bases known as payload handling facilities. They were also attached to units in the Army, Navy and Air Force that operated nuclear weapons as well.

== Organization 1972 ==
- Headquarters
- 62nd Missile Regiment (BRK-1) with 10 UR-100 silos
- 309th Missile Regiment (BRK-2) with 10 UR-100 silos
- 83rd Missile Regiment (BRK-5) with 10 UR-100 silos
- 115th Missile Regiment (BRK-4) with 10 UR-100 silos
- 116th Missile Regiment (BRK-8) with 10 UR-100 silos
- 355th Missile Regiment (BRK-9) with 10 UR-100 silos
- 107th Independent Helicopter Squadron
- 117th Repair-Technical Base (attached to 84th Missile Regiment)
- 1510th Repair-Technical Base (attached to 434th Missile Regiment)
- 1805th Repair-Technical Base (directly under 46th Missile Division since 1968)
