= 60th Rocket Division =

60th Taiman Order of the October Revolution Red Banner Rocket Division named after the 60th anniversary of the USSR
- 60-я ракетная Таманская ордена Октябрьской Революции Краснознамённая дивизия имени 60-летия СССР
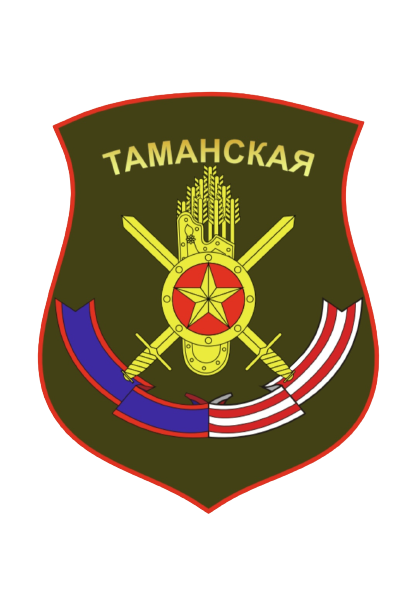
- Active: 1961–present
- Country: Soviet Union (1961–1991); Russia (1991–present)
- Branch: Strategic Rocket Forces
- Part of: 27th Guards Rocket Army
- Garrison/HQ: Svetly, Saratov Oblast
- Decorations: Order of the October Revolution; Order of the Red Banner

The 60th Taiman Order of the October Revolution Red Banner Rocket Division named after the 60th anniversary of the USSR (Russian: 60-я ракетная Таманская ордена Октябрьской Революции Краснознамённая дивизия имени 60-летия СССР) (Military Unit Number 89553) is a military formation of the Russian Strategic Rocket Forces formed in 1961.

The unit operates a combination of UR-100NU and RT-2PM2 Topol-M intercontinental ballistic missiles depending on the regiment. They began to be replaced with RS-24 Yars missiles in 2025. It is garrisoned in the closed city of Svetly, Saratov Oblast.

== History ==
The 60th Rocket Division was formed in 1961 in Birobidzhan, Jewish Autonomous Oblast. In 1964 it was moved to Saratov Oblast.

== Commanders ==
Commanders of the 60th Rocket Division
No.	Name	From	To
1	Major General Leonid S. Severov	July 1961	December 1963
2	Major General Viktor L. Kovalenko	December 1963	December 1974
3	Major General Nikolai Ya. Lopatin	December 1974	September 1981
4	Major General Aleksei A. Kasyanov	September 1981	July 1986
5	Major General Yuri M. Makarovsky	July 1986	January 1989
6	Major General Stanislav N. Chilikin	January 1989	May 1991
7	Major General Vladimir N. Yakovlev	May 1991	May 1993
8	Major General Yuri E. Kononov	May 1993	April 1997
9	Major General Yuri N. Kavelin	April 1997	January 18 2001
10	Major General Vladimir A. Kirillov	January 18 2001	2009
11	Colonel Aleksander V. Deryavko	2009	April 2011
12	Colonel Andrei G. Loginov	April 2011	2012
13	Major General Leonid A. Mikholap	2012	December 2014
14	Colonel Mikhail V. Baitov	December 2014	present

== Structure ==
Structure as of 2007:

- 31st Rocket Regiment
- 86th Rocket Regiment
- 104th Rocket Regiment
- 122nd Rocket Regiment
- 165th Rocket Regiment
- 203rd Rocket Regiment
- 271st Rocket Regiment
- 626th Rocket Regiment
- 649th Rocket Regiment
- 687th Rocket Regiment
