= 8th Rocket Division =

8th Melitopol Red Banner Rocket Division 25th Rocket Brigade (1960–1961)
- 8-я ракетная Мелитопольская Краснознаменная дивизия
- Active: 1961–present
- Country: Soviet Union (1960–1991); Russia (1991–present)
- Branch: Strategic Rocket Forces
- Part of: 31st Rocket Army
- Garrison/HQ: Yurya, Kirov Oblast
- Decorations: Order of the Red Banner

Commanders
- Current commander: Colonel Yuri V. Yatsyno

The 8th Melitopol Red Banner Rocket Division (Russian: 8-я ракетная Мелитопольская Краснознаменная дивизия) (Military Unit Number 44200) is a military formation of the Russian Strategic Rocket Forces formed in 1961.

The unit operates RT-2PM Topol intercontinental ballistic missile launchers. It is garrisoned in Yurya, Kirov Oblast.

== History ==
In 1960 the 25th Rocket Brigade was formed. The new unit was given the awards and honors of the 91st Rifle Division, disbanded 1959. In 1961 the 25th Rocket Brigade was renamed and enlarged to the 8th Rocket Division.

== Commanders ==
Commanders of the 8th Rocket Division
No.	Name	From	To
1	Major General Aleksander G. Savelyev	20 August 1960	28 May 1965
2	Major General Andrei G. Gontarenko	28 May 1965	20 May 1971
3	Major General Veniamin P. Plyusnin	20 May 1971	18 March 1976
4	Major General Vladimir Ye. Balikhin	18 March 1976	5 August 1981
5	Major General Anany V. Politsyn	5 August 1981	1 December 1985
6	Major General Vladimir A. Babeshko	1 December 1985	21 January 1989
7	Major General Vladimir I. Kalyanov	21 January 1989	30 November 1993
8	Major General Vasily I. Malafeyev	30 November 1993	14 June 1995
9	Major General Gennady N. Kovalenko	14 June 1995	16 June 1999
10	Major General Sergei A. Artemyev	16 June 1999	3 September 2002
11	Major General Sergei I. Arzamastsev	3 September 2002	9 November 2005
12	Major General Vitaly V. Golovach	9 November 2005	July 2007
13	Colonel Eduard Ye. Stefantsov	July 2007	22 October 2009
14	Colonel Igor S. Afonin	22 October 2009	October 2010
15	Colonel Leonid A. Mikholap	25 October 2010	February 2012
16	Colonel Yuri V. Yatsyno	March 2012	present

== Structure ==
=== 1998 ===
- 76th Rocket Regiment
- 79th Rocket Regiment
- 107th Rocket Regiment
- 304th Rocket Regiment
- 776th Rocket Regiment

=== 2004 ===
- 76th Rocket Regiment
- 304th Rocket Regiment
- 776th Rocket Regiment
- 224th Helicopter Squadron (Military Unit No. 19964)
- 836th Technical Base and Repair Depot (Military Unit No. 14092)
- 2434th Technical Missile Base (Military Unit No. 12829)
