= Pervomaisk, Mykolaiv Oblast =

City in Mykolaiv Oblast, Ukraine

Pervomaisk Первомайськ
- City
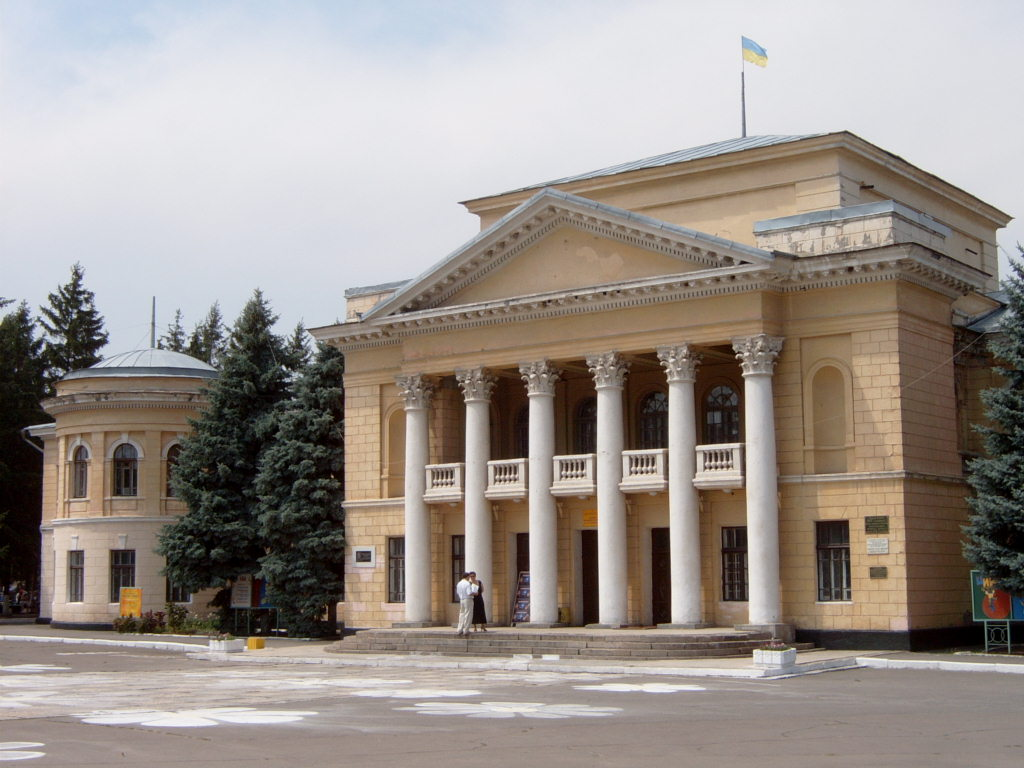
- Main square in Pervomaisk

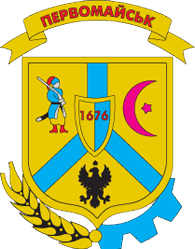
- Flag Coat of arms
- Interactive map of Pervomaisk
- Location of Pervomaisk Pervomaisk (Ukraine)
- Coordinates: 48°02′38″N 30°51′00″E
- Country: Ukraine
- Oblast: Mykolaiv Oblast
- Raion: Pervomaisk Raion
- Hromada: Pervomaisk urban hromada
- Founded: 1676
- City status: 1773

Government
  - Mayor: Oleh Mykhailovich Demchenko

Area
  - Total: 25.14 km^{2} (9.71 sq mi)

Population (2022)
  - Total: 62,426
  - Density: 2,483/km^{2} (6,431/sq mi)
- Postal code: 55200-55219
- Area code: +380-5161
- Website: http://www.pervomaisk.mk.ua/

Pervomaisk (Ukrainian: Первомайськ, IPA: [perwoˈmɑjsʲk]; Russian: Первомайск, romanized: Pervomaysk) is a city in Mykolaiv Oblast, Ukraine. It serves as the administrative center of Pervomaisk Raion within the oblast. It is located on the Southern Bug River which bisects the city. Pervomaisk also hosts the administration of Pervomaisk urban hromada, one of the hromadas of Ukraine. Population: 62,426 (2022 estimate); 70,170 (2001).

The city is known for being a center (headquarters) of the 46th Rocket Division of the Soviet Strategic Rocket Forces during the Soviet period.

Until 18 July 2020, Pervomaisk was incorporated as a city of oblast significance. It also served as the administrative center of Pervomaisk Raion even though it did not belong to the raion. In July 2020, as part of the administrative reform of Ukraine, which reduced the number of raions of Mykolaiv Oblast to four, the city of Pervomaisk was merged into Pervomaisk Raion.

== Etymology ==
The name derives from the Russian pervomay (первомай) meaning "the first of May," (May Day). The city was formed in 1919 after the Bolshevik victory in the Ukrainian-Soviet war, as a result of the merger of three historic towns in the area.

The name for one of the merged towns, Bohopil (or Bohopol), was derived from the name of a local river Southern Bug which in Polish and Ukrainian is named Boh.

== History ==
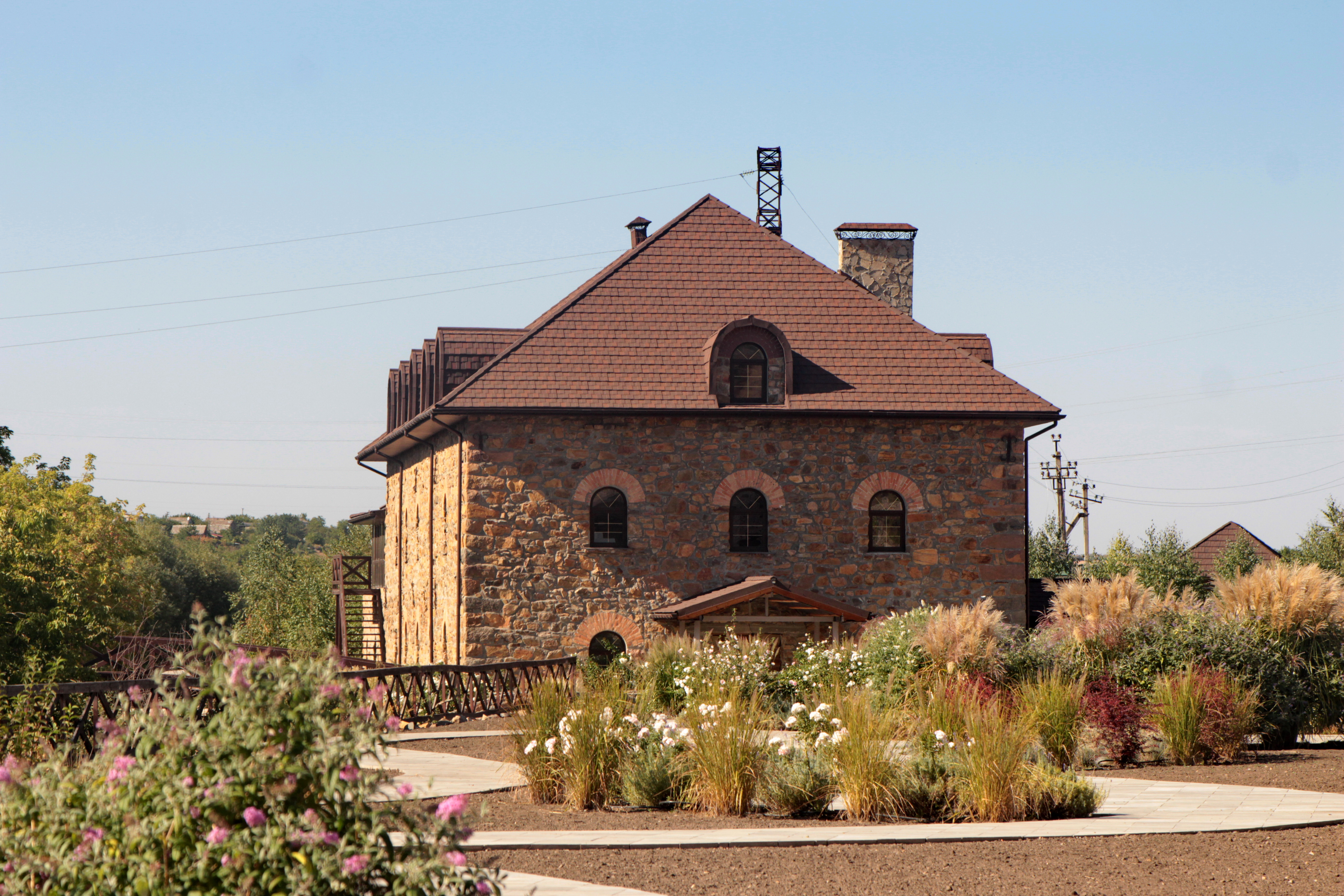
Old mill on the Syniukha River

The city was formed in 1919, when three neighbouring settlements: the village of Holta (Голта), the town of Bohopil (Богопіль), and county city of Olviopol (Ольвіополь) were merged.

In 1420, Lithuanian Duke Vytautas built a bridge for merchants in the vicinity. In the late 17th and 18th centuries the tripoint of the Polish–Lithuanian Commonwealth, the Ottoman Empire and the Tsardom of Russia was located there.

The history Olviopol dates back to 1676, when the Orlyk (Орлик) fortress was founded by the Cossacks in protection against Crimean Tatar raids. In 1781 it was granted town rights and renamed Olviopol after the ancient Greek city of Olbia. It was part of the Zaporizhian Sich and Russian Empire, and is located in the historic region of Zaporizhzhia.

Bohopol, as it was known in Polish, arose after the Poles built a border fortress at the site. It was a private town of the Potocki family, administratively located in Bracław County in the Bracław Voivodeship in the Lesser Poland Province of the Kingdom of Poland. It was annexed by Russia in the Second Partition of Poland in 1793. It is located in the historic region of Podolia.

Holta was a village founded in 1762. It was located in the Ottoman Empire until its annexation by Russia in 1791. In the late 19th century, despite its village status, it had two breweries and an iron factory, and its population exceeded 4,000. It is located in the historic region of Yedisan.

On 19 March 1920 Bohopil was taken by a cavalry brigade of the Ukrainian People's Army from Bolshevik troops during the First Winter Campaign. Afterwards it was administratively part of the Odesa Governorate of Ukraine.

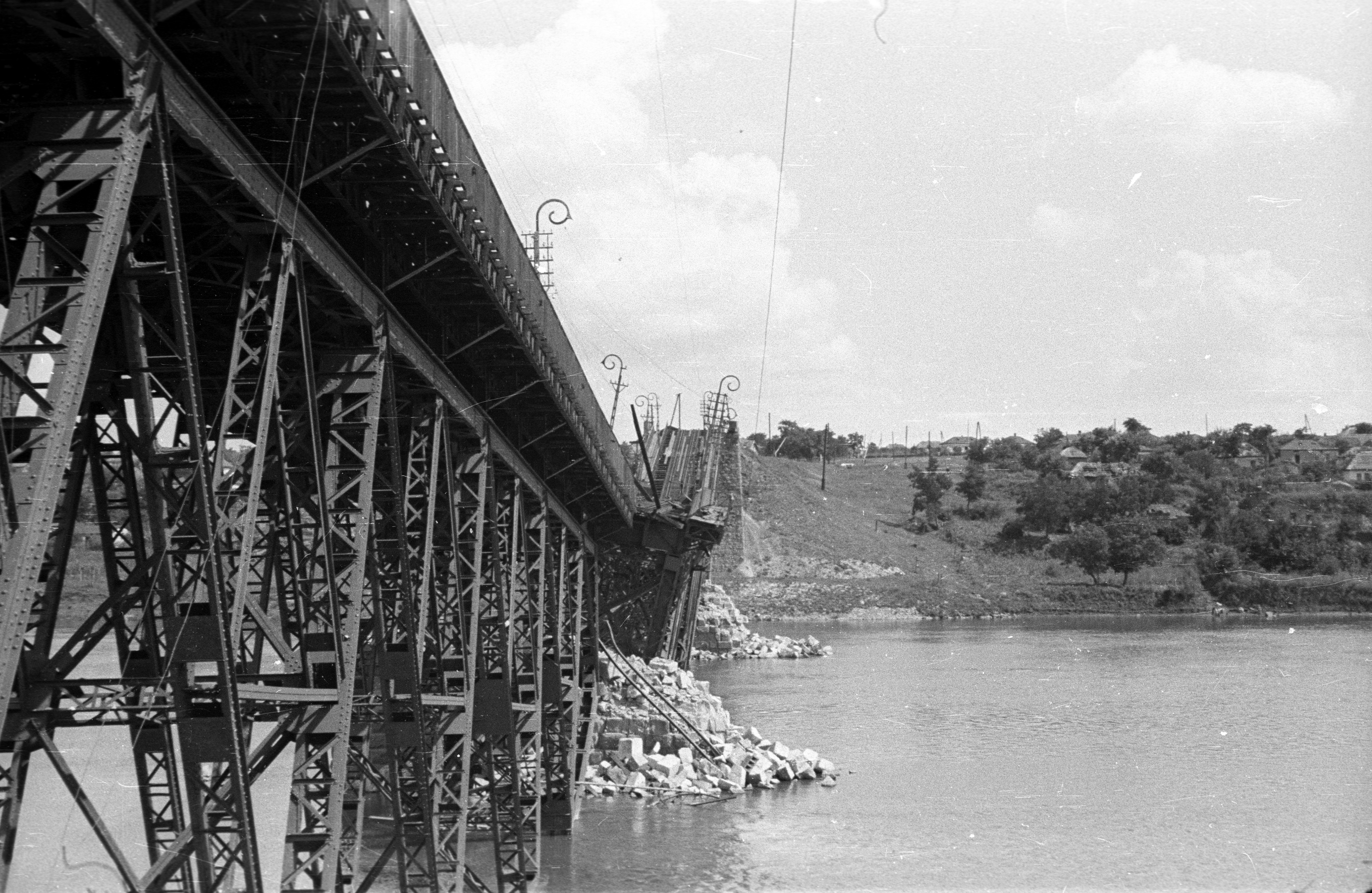
Damaged bridge in 1941

=== World War II and the Holocaust ===
Before World War II, Pervomaisk had a substantial Jewish community. Approximately 6,000 Jews remained in the city on the eve of the German invasion of the Soviet Union.

German forces occupied Pervomaisk on 2 August 1941. An unknown number of Jewish residents escaped or were evacuated eastward or entered the Red Army. The German military authorities ordered the Jews who remained to wear armbands bearing a Star of David and imposed a curfew. By mid-September, most of the city's Jews had been concentrated in the Bohopil section of Pervomaisk.

The occupation subsequently divided the city. On 18 October 1941, Holta, also known as Golta, on the western side of the Southern Bug, passed under Romanian administration and became part of the Transnistria Governorate, while Bohopil and Olviopol on the eastern side remained under German occupation. Holta became the administrative centre of Golta County, one of the counties of Romanian-controlled Transnistria.

Under German rule, the Jews confined in Bohopil were subjected to a series of mass killings. During an Aktion on 17 September 1941, German forces murdered several hundred Jews. A further 120 were shot near a brick factory in October, and another major killing operation took place on 15 December. On 9 January 1942, the Germans murdered virtually all of the Jews remaining in the Bohopil ghetto except for approximately 30 skilled workers; the latter were killed about a month later. In February and March 1942, German forces also murdered approximately 1,600 Jewish deportees brought to the vicinity of Pervomaisk from Romanian-controlled territory.

On the Romanian-controlled side, some Jews who escaped from the German occupation zone took refuge in Holta. In June 1942, Romanian authorities confined them in a barbed-wire-enclosed ghetto. By the autumn of that year approximately 450 Jews were living there, including Jews deported from Bessarabia and Bukovina. At the end of 1942, some of the local Jews were deported from Holta to killing and detention sites elsewhere in Golta County, including the Bogdanovka and Akhmechetka camps; some survivors were returned to Holta after approximately two weeks.

In December 1942, another group of approximately 280 Jews deported from Bucharest and other parts of the Romanian Old Kingdom arrived in Holta. Romanian authorities confined local Jews and deportees from Romania in two separate ghetto areas, whose inhabitants established a joint Jewish committee. The prisoners were subjected to forced labour, while Jewish physicians among the deportees worked in Romanian and Ukrainian hospitals. Jews considered incapable of work risked being murdered or deported to Akhmechetka.

As the centre of Golta County, Holta was closely connected administratively with some of the largest killing sites of the Holocaust in Romanian-occupied Transnistria. At Bogdanovka, tens of thousands of Jews, many deported from Odesa, were murdered between December 1941 and January 1942 by Romanian gendarmes, Ukrainian police and ethnic German Selbstschutz units. At nearby Domanovka approximately 18,000 Jews were killed between January and March 1942, while Akhmechetka was used to imprison Jews whom Romanian officials considered incapable of labour.

Conditions for the surviving Jews in Holta improved somewhat during 1943. Beginning in October, Romanian authorities permitted some deportees from Bucharest and the Old Kingdom to return home. Romanian gendarmerie statistics recorded 72 deportees from Bessarabia and Bukovina and approximately 100 Ukrainian Jews remaining in Holta at the end of 1943.

The Germans also operated a subcamp of the Stalag 305 prisoner-of-war camp in Pervomaisk.

The German and Romanian occupation ended in March 1944 during the Soviet westward advance. Troops of the 2nd Ukrainian Front, commanded by Marshal Ivan Konev, captured Pervomaisk on 22 March after fighting around the Southern Bug, ending German control of Bohopil and Olviopol and Romanian administration of Holta. Fighting continued in the surrounding area for several days as Axis forces withdrew southwestward, and by 27 March the Pervomaisk district had returned to Soviet control.

=== Post-war ===
Elements of the Soviet Strategic Rocket Forces arrived in Pervomaisk for the first time as early as June 1960, and were present throughout the Cold War. The U.S.-funded Cooperative Threat Reduction Program began funding dismantlement of the missile infrastructure in the 1990s.

In 2023, the working group of the National Commission on State Language Standards included Pervomaisk in the list of settlements in Ukraine that contain words with the root "Pervomai" ("1 May", the International Workers' Day of the Soviet Union) and can be renamed as part of decommunization and derussification campaigns in Ukraine. In late June 2023 the Pervomaisk City Council initiated a public voting on renaming the city. In April 2024, the Commission supported to rename Pervomaisk to Olviopol. However, on 9 October 2024, the proposed name Olviopol did not get enough votes in the Verkhovna Rada, and neither did the name Olviia. Since 7 October 2024, the vote for another proposed name, Bohoslavsk, is pending.

== Geography ==
=== Climate ===
Climate data for Pervomaisk, Mykolaiv Oblast (1981–2010)
| Month | Jan | Feb | Mar | Apr | May | Jun | Jul | Aug | Sep | Oct | Nov | Dec | Year |
|---|---|---|---|---|---|---|---|---|---|---|---|---|---|
| Mean daily maximum °C (°F) | 0.2 (32.4) | 1.5 (34.7) | 7.3 (45.1) | 16.0 (60.8) | 22.7 (72.9) | 25.8 (78.4) | 28.3 (82.9) | 28.1 (82.6) | 21.8 (71.2) | 14.7 (58.5) | 6.7 (44.1) | 1.5 (34.7) | 14.6 (58.3) |
| Daily mean °C (°F) | −2.6 (27.3) | −2.2 (28.0) | 2.6 (36.7) | 10.0 (50.0) | 16.2 (61.2) | 19.6 (67.3) | 21.8 (71.2) | 21.2 (70.2) | 15.6 (60.1) | 9.4 (48.9) | 3.0 (37.4) | −1.4 (29.5) | 9.4 (48.9) |
| Mean daily minimum °C (°F) | −5.6 (21.9) | −5.3 (22.5) | −1.1 (30.0) | 4.7 (40.5) | 9.9 (49.8) | 13.8 (56.8) | 15.7 (60.3) | 14.9 (58.8) | 10.1 (50.2) | 5.0 (41.0) | 0.1 (32.2) | −4.0 (24.8) | 4.9 (40.8) |
| Average precipitation mm (inches) | 34.6 (1.36) | 34.3 (1.35) | 32.8 (1.29) | 33.2 (1.31) | 48.4 (1.91) | 79.3 (3.12) | 74.0 (2.91) | 52.5 (2.07) | 56.3 (2.22) | 38.8 (1.53) | 44.1 (1.74) | 37.8 (1.49) | 566.1 (22.29) |
| Average precipitation days (≥ 1.0 mm) | 7.1 | 6.9 | 6.7 | 6.4 | 7.0 | 8.9 | 7.6 | 5.5 | 6.1 | 5.6 | 6.6 | 6.9 | 81.3 |
| Average relative humidity (%) | 83.9 | 81.7 | 75.6 | 65.1 | 63.4 | 68.1 | 65.5 | 63.4 | 70.0 | 76.7 | 84.1 | 85.6 | 73.6 |
Source: World Meteorological Organization

== Demographics ==
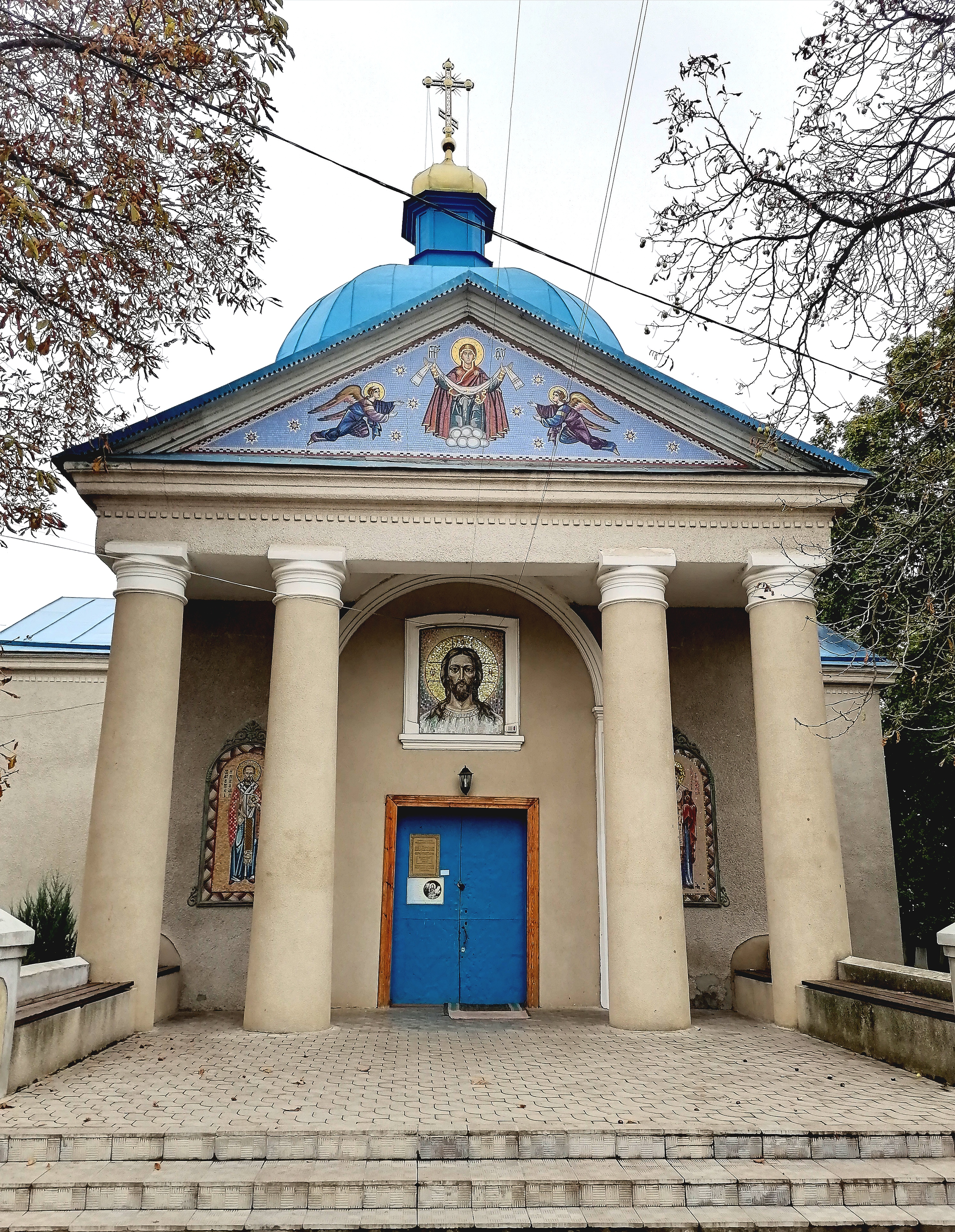
Church of the Intercession

At the time of the only Ukrainian census conducted after the collapse of the Soviet Union, the city counted a population of 70,746 inhabitants, which made it the second-largest city in the region after Mykolaiv, which counted 509,102 inhabitants at the time. The city is mostly Ukrainian, yet a sizeable Russian minority resides in within the settlement's boundaries. The exact ethnic and linguistic composition was as follows:

Ethnic composition of Pervomaisk
| | percent |
| Ukrainians | 85.88% |
| Russians | 10.90% |
| Belarusians | 0.50% |
| Bulgarians | 0.44% |
| Moldovans | 0.33% |
| Jews | 0.30% |
| Armenians | 0.15% |
| Azerbaijanis | 0.12% |
| Tatars | 0.10% |
| Poles | 0.07% |

First language composition of Pervomaisk
| | percent |
| Ukrainian | 82.8% |
| Russian | 15.8% |
| Belarusian | 0.2% |
| Moldovan (Romanian) | 0.1% |
| Armenian | 0.1% |
| Bulgarian | 0.1% |
| Romani | 0.1% |
| others | 0.2% |

== Remarkable buildings and structures ==
In Pervomaisk, there is at 48°4'0"N 30°51'29"E a 196 metres tall guyed TV mast, equipped with 6 crossbars running from the mast body to the guys.

Pervomaisk was the former location of the 46th Rocket Division of the 43rd Rocket Army of the Soviet Strategic Rocket Forces, formed during the Cold War. The RT-23UTTKh intercontinental ballistic missile silos based at Pervomaisk were destroyed, partially with Nunn–Lugar Cooperative Threat Reduction programme funding, during the 1990s.

== Notable people ==
- Selig Brodetsky (1888–1954), British mathematician, President of the Hebrew University of Jerusalem
- Denys Kostyuk (born 1982), Ukrainian racing cyclist
- Mykola Vilinskyi (1888-1956), Ukrainian composer
- Mykola Vinhranovsky (1936–2004), Ukrainian poet, writer, actor and filmmaker
- Edgar de Wahl (1867–1948), Baltic German teacher, mathematician and linguist, creator of Interlingue

== See also ==
- Lysa Hora
