= 27th Guards Rocket Army =

27th Guards Vitebsk Red Banner Rocket Army
- Active: April 1970
- Country: Soviet Union (1970–1991); Russia (1991–present)
- Branch: Strategic Rocket Forces
- Type: Rocket army
- Headquarters: Vladimir, Vladimir Oblast
- Decorations: Order of the Red Banner

Commanders
- Current commander: Guards Major General Oleg Leonidovich Glazunov

27th Guards Vitebsk Red Banner Rocket Army (Russian: 27-я Гвардейская Витебская Краснознамённая ракетная армия) is one of the 3 rocket armies within Russian Strategic Rocket Forces headquartered at Vladimir, Vladimir Oblast in Western Russia.

In August 1959, based on the headquarters of the disbanded 10th Breakthrough Artillery Division 'Gumbinnen Orders of Suvorov and Kutuzov' of the Reserve of the Supreme High Command (Russian acronym RVGK), the formation of an organizational group 46th Training Artillery Range (Military Unit No. 43176) temporarily located in Mozyr, Gomel Oblast, Byelorussian Soviet Socialist Republic, was begun. It was subsequently relocated to the city of Krasnoyarsk.

In June 1960, in accordance with a directive of the General Staff dated 5 May 1960, an organizing group of the 46 Training Artillery Range relocated to the city of Vladimir, on the territory of the 7th Red Banner Vitebsk Guards Cannon Artillery Division of the RVGK. RVGK pad was turned on staffing organizational group of 46 Training Artillery Range, the rest of the staff – on staffing three rocket engineering brigades: the 165th (Kostroma), 197th (Vladimir Teykovo), 198th (Kozelsk, became 28th Guards Rocket Division). At the same time began the study of new missile technology.

On 10 March 1961 based on the 46th ALM HQ 3rd Separate Vitebsk Rocket Corps was formed. Appointed corps commander of the Guards, Major General AD Melekhin.

The 27th Army was formed in April 1970 on the base of the 3rd Separate Guards Vitebsk Rocket Corps and the 5th Separate Rocket Corps. The 27th Army is equipped with UR-100, RT-2PM Topol and RT-2UTTH Topol M intercontinental ballistic missiles.

== Commanders ==
- 1970–1976: Lieutenant General (since 27 April 1975 Colonel General) of the Guards Vladimir Mikhailovich Vishenkov
- 1976–1985: Lieutenant General (since 16 December 1982 Colonel General) of the Guards Vladimir Petrovich Shilovsky
- 1985–1988: Lieutenant General of the Guards Gennadi Alekseyevich Kolesnikov
- 1989–1994: Lieutenant General of the Guards Ivan Vasilyevich Vershkov
- 1994–1996: Colonel General of the Guards Vladimir Nikolayevich Yakovlev
- 1997–2001: Lieutenant General of the Guards Yuri Fyodorovich Kirillov
- 2001–2002: Lieutenant General of the Guards Viktor Petrovich Alekseev
- 2002–2006: Lieutenant General of the Guards Vladimir Grigoryevich Gagarin
- 2006–2008: Lieutenant General of the Guards Sergei Viktorovich Karakayev
- 2008–2010: Major General of the Guards Vladimir Vasilyevich Antsiferov
- 2010–2016: Major General (since June 2013 Lieutenant General) of the Guards Sergey Viktorovich Siver
- 2016–2019: Major General (since December 2018 Lieutenant General) of the Guards Igor Robertovich Fazletdinov
- 2019–2021: Lieutenant General of the Guards Andrei Anatolyevich Burdin
- since 2021: Major General of the Guards Oleg Leonidovich Glazunov

== Composition ==
=== 1993 ===
- 7th Guards Rocket Division (Vypolzovo, Tver Oblast)
- 8th Rocket Division (Yurya, Kirov Oblast) – Activated 20.7.60 in Yurya, Kirov Oblast, as the 25th Missile Brigade, from parts of the 24th Artillery Range Administration. Awards and honours from the 91st Motor Rifle Division.
- 10th Guards Rocket Division (Kostroma, Kostroma Oblast)
- 28th Guards Rocket Division (Kozelsk, Kaluga Oblast)
- 32nd Rocket Division (Postavy, Vitebsk Oblast; disbanded 1.12.93)
- 33rd Guards Rocket Division (Mozyr, Gomel Oblast)
- 49th Guards Rocket Division (Lida, Grodno Region)
- 54th Guards Rocket Division (Teykovo, Ivanovo Oblast)
- 60th Rocket Division (Tatischevo, Saratov Oblast).

The 33rd and 49th Rocket Divisions were disbanded in 1997, and the 10th Guards Rocket Division in 2005.

=== 2006 ===
- 7th Guards Rocket Division (Vypolzovo, Tver Oblast)
- 8th Rocket Division (Yurya, Kirov Oblast)
- 14th Rocket Division (Yoshkar-Ola, Mari-El Republic)
- 28th Guards Rocket Division (Kozelsk, Kaluga Oblast)
- 54th Guards Rocket Division (Teykovo, Ivanovo Oblast)
- 60th Missile Division (Tatischevo, Saratov Oblast)
- 98th independent Mixed Aviation Squadron
- 65th Communications Center

=== Current ===
- 7th Guards Rocket Division (Military Unit Number 14245) (Closed city (ZATO) Ozyorny, Tver Oblast)
- 14th Kiev-Zhitomir Rocket Division (Yoshkar-Ola, Mari El Republic) – resubordinated to 27th Army July 2002. Equipped with RT-2PM Topol (SS-25) ICBMs.
- 28th Guards Red Banner Rocket Division
- 54th Guards Order of Kutuzov second degree Rocket Division
- 60th Taman Order of October Revolution Red Banner Rocket Division (Tatishchevsky District)
