= 31st Rocket Army =

- Active: 8 June 1970
- Country: Soviet Union (1970–1991); Russia (1991–present)
- Branch: Strategic Rocket Forces
- Type: Rocket army
- Garrison/HQ: Rostoshi, Orenburg

Commanders
- Current commander: Major General Sergei Talatynnik

31st Rocket Army (Russian: 31-я ракетная армия) is one of the three rocket armies within Russian Strategic Rocket Forces headquartered in Orenburg. The 31st Rocket Army was formed on 8 June 1970, on the base of the 18th Separate Rocket Corps. The 31st Army is equipped with R-36M and RT-2PM Topol intercontinental ballistic missiles.

The 17th Rocket Brigade (В/ч No. 44093) was formed November 15, 1964, in Shadrinsk, Kurgan Oblast, based on the 703rd Separate Rocket Regiment left after the dissolution of the 18th Rocket Division and the transfer of the 43rd Guards Missile Division (Romny Sumy region), as part of Operation Anadyr, the deployment of strategic missiles to Cuba, three of its four missile regiments. Batteries of the 703rd Rocket Regiment were deployed in missile regiments in March 1964. Headquarters were in Shadrinsk on the 10th floor. To combat regiment led concrete road. The farthest regiment was 54 kilometers from the city. A cement plant was built to construct roads, buildings, and residential homes. In March 1970, became part of the formed 31st Rocket Army, headquartered in Orenburg. In connection with the activities resulting from the SALT-1 and SALT-2 treaties, up to December 1979 the 17th RBR was dismantled and all nine R-16U silos destroyed. In the same year the brigade was disbanded. A cadre strength motor rifle division was placed on its territory Lufia with a large database storage of weapons and military equipment (now disbanded).

From 1970, a number of rocket divisions have been under the army's control: the 8th Rocket Division, 13th, 14, (41), 42, 50, 52, (55), 59th. One of these previously active divisions was the 52nd Rocket Division (RT-23UTTKh, SS-24 Scalpel) at Bershet, Perm Oblast.

- 52nd Rocket Division joined the 31st Army in 1970 and was disbanded in 2002.
- 59th Rocket Division was disbanded in 2005.

There are three rocket divisions that are under command of the 31st Army:

- 8th Rocket Division at Pervomaysky, Kirov Oblast
- 13th Red Banner Rocket Division at Dombarovsky, Orenburg Oblast
- 42nd Rocket Division - at the Urban-type settlement of Svobodny, Sverdlovsk Oblast with 36 mobile RT-2PM Topol (Svobodny is 35 km from Nizhniy Tagil and 15 km from Verkhnyaya Salda).

== Commanders ==
- 27 June 1970 – 5 June 1979: Colonel General Ivan Andreyevich Shevtsov
- 5 June 1979 – 8 November 1985: Colonel General Vladimir Ivanovich Gerasimov
- 8 November 1985 – 17 August 1988: Major General Nikolai Maksimovich Chichevatov
- 17 August 1988 – 2 November 1993: Major General Igor Vasiliyevich Pustovoy
- 4 November 1993 – 22 June 2002: Major General Anatoly Sergeyevich Borzenkov
- 22 June 2002 - 12 October 2007: Lieutenant General Yuri Yevgenyevich Kononov
- 12 October 2007 - 4 September 2010: Lieutenant General Ivan Fyodorovich Reva
- 4 September 2010 - 30 June 2020: Lieutenant General Antaloy Grigorevich Kulay
- Since 30 June 2020: Major General Sergei Andreyevich Talatynnik
