= Berset (disambiguation) =

Berset refers to Alain Berset, president of Switzerland in 2018 and 2023.

Berset may also refer to:

- Daniel Berset, Swiss artist whose works include Broken Chair in Geneva
- Jean-Marc Berset, Swiss para-cyclist who competed at multiple Cycling events at the 2012 Summer Paralympics
- Kristen Berset, Miss Florida USA 2004 beauty pageant winner and television journalist
- Stefanie Berset, Swiss curler

== See also ==
- Bergset, village in Norway
- Bershet, town in Russia
