= RT23 =

RT23 may refer to:

- RT-23 Molodets, Soviet intercontinental ballistic missile
- Ralt RT23, 1991 Australian racing car
