= 12th Chief Directorate =

Department within the Russian Ministry of Defense

12th Chief Directorate of the Ministry of Defense
- 12th Chief Directorate emblem
- Active: 4 September 1947–present
- Country: Russian Federation (1991–present); Soviet Union (1947–1991)
- Branch: Ministry of Defense
- Role: Management and control over the maintenance, development and operation of Russia's nuclear arsenal
- Part of: Ministry of Defence (Russia)
- Headquarters: House number 19, Bolshoi Znamensky lane, Sokolniki District, Moscow

Commanders
- Commander: Lt Gen. Igor Kolesnikov
- Deputy Commander: Maj Gen. A. V. Rozhnov

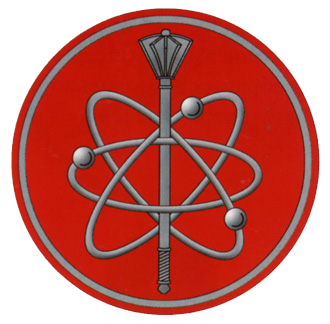
Sleeve patch of the 12th Chief Directorate

The 12th Chief (or "Main") Directorate of the Ministry of Defense (12 GU MO) of the former Soviet Union and of the Russian Federation after 1991 (Russian: 12 Главное Управление Министерства Обороны СССР/РФ (Ядерно-техническое обеспечение и Безопасность) is a highly secretive department within the Russian Ministry of Defense. Since its creation in 1947, it is responsible for the safe-keeping, technical maintenance, transportation, delivery, issuance, disposal, etc. of the Russian nuclear weapons, and all nuclear weapons storage sites operated by nuclear capable units of the Strategic Rocket Forces, Ground Forces, Air Force and Navy, as well as the testing of nuclear charges, which includes ensuring ecological safety of such tests and the maintenance of former Soviet/Russian testing grounds. These are known in Russian as "polygons" – in Semipalatinsk (Semipalatinsk Test Site, now Kazakhstan) and on Novaya Zemlya Archipelago.

Unlike the GRU (Chief Directorate of Intelligence), the 12th GU MO is not a chief directorate of the General Staff, but a chief directorate of the Ministry of Defense. As such it is not subordinated to the Chief of the General Staff of the Soviet/Russian Armed Forces, but directly to the Minister of Defense, which makes it higher in status compared to the GRU. The position of the Chief of the 12th GU MO is equal to that of the commander of a military district, and supposed to be occupied by a 4-star General or by a Marshal of Artillery. However, in practice, out of seven chiefs of this Organization, only one (E.V. Boichuk) has held such a high rank – the other six were only three-star Generals.

== Officers ==
Officers, or cadres, for the 12th GU MO are supplied mainly by a special nuclear weapons faculty of the Peter the Great Military Academy of the Strategic Missile Forces situated in Serpukhov, near Moscow, and by a special faculty of the Dzerzhinsky Military Academy. The 12th GU MO maintains its own training facility for commissioned officers and for warrant-officers at Sharapovo village, near the city of Sergiev Posad, where commissioned officers possessing other military specialties are educated in nuclear arsenal maintenance skills in 6-month-long courses. Non-essential specialists (those commissioned and non-commissioned officers and soldiers who perform general tasks unrelated to nuclear weapons) could be supplied by other military colleges and academies, but these people can not obtain positions in the 12th GU MO or in either of its subordinated units unless they (as well as their family) could get a special security clearance.

In the USSR only members of the Communist Party of the Soviet Union could be appointed to serve in the 12th GU MO or in any of its subordinated units, including its Special Control Service (even young conscripts who served there only two years without actually knowing anything about nuclear weapons must obtain special security clearance and must necessarily be members of the Communist Union of Youth, a.k.a. "Komsomol").

== Structure and tasks ==
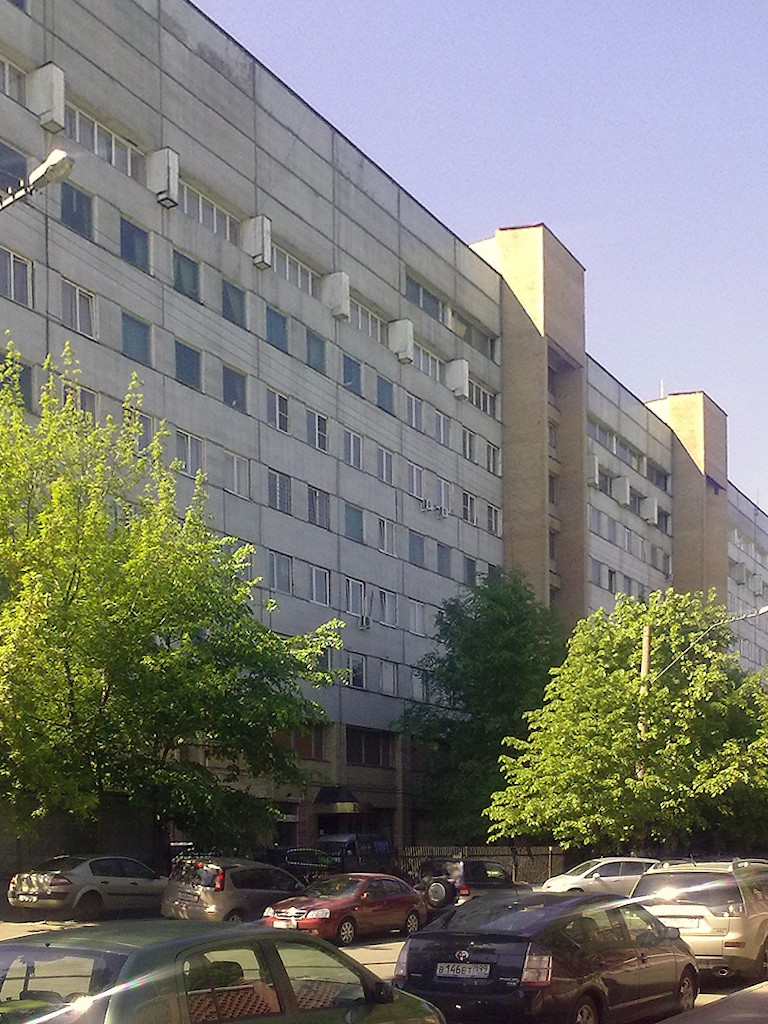
Headquarters of the 12th Chief Directorate in Moscow

In its main part the 12th GU MO consists of the headquarters, or the "directorate of the Chief of the 12 Chief Directorate", located in central Moscow – Znamenskiy Pereulok 19, unit number 31600. There was also a central archive, popularly known as "the nuclear registrar," where any and every piece of the Soviet or Russian nuclear munitions is registered. Besides, it consists of a network of nuclear arsenal bases both central and "dedicated" where nuclear warheads/munitions are actually being kept. During the Soviet period, these units were known as "Repair-Technical Bases". In addition to their main duties, they were also tasked with security of all nuclear weapons sites. These bases are now called "Special-Technical Formations", but their whole is called "Special Troops of Supreme Command Reserve".

Each base is typically the size of a regiment, sometimes the size of a brigade, but it is usually commanded by a major-general or sometimes by a rear admiral rather than by a colonel because their importance and elevated status makes them technically equal to that of a regular infantry or other division. Many of commanding officers serving at its Moscow headquarters bear general's and admiral's ranks, since almost all of them are being promoted from among remote arsenal base commanders. That is why the percentage of generals and admirals among commissioned officers in the 12th GU MO is considerably higher than in any other military organization of the Russian Army or the Russian Navy. Such nuclear arsenal bases are usually located far enough from big cities (at least 50 kilometres), but close enough to the military units that would use these nuclear warheads in case of war (primarily it is Intercontinental Ballistic Missile batteries, but also missile batteries with shorter range, theatre and tactical missile units, navy and aviation units armed with nuclear weapons, units of military saboteurs and engineers that were supposed to use portable nuclear munitions, anti-aircraft and anti-ballistic missile defences that use nuclear-tipped missiles, etc.). So the main purpose of the 12th Chief Directorate's existence is to securely separate "end-users" of nuclear weapons from their actual nuclear weapons during times of peace. Only in case of real necessity those who are supposed to have nuclear weapons would get them and it could only happen when authorized by the top political leadership. Presently only some small number of nuclear warheads are always issued to end-users, such as warheads attached to ballistic missiles currently at service, but most of the Russian nuclear arsenal is being securely kept by the 12th Chief Directorate units and could only be issued to others in case of emergency.

Moreover, this organization is tasked to collect currently issued nuclear warheads back from their end-users for a reason of replacement or upgrading, and to conduct technical maintenance on nuclear weapons currently issued to end-users at their territories. For this reason each military unit that armed with nuclear warheads currently in service also has some permanently attached representatives of the 12th GU MO nearest arsenal bases whose main duty is to supervise prescribed handling and to conduct required technical maintenance of these issued nuclear warheads. The 12th GU MO nuclear arsenal bases' staff is additionally trained for being able to attach nuclear warheads to their carriers, ballistic and other missiles, to strategic bombers and to other kind of aircraft, a task which usually assigned to special units of end-users. Such additional training is conducted for a reason that 12th GU MO specialists could replace specialists of the end-users in this capacity in case of emergency.

Another task of the 12th GU MO is to prevent so-called "nuclear terrorism", but this is a relatively modern task, which did not exist formerly. Besides these nuclear arsenal bases, the 12th Chief Directorate maintains several nuclear weapons research institutes in Moscow and in Sergiev Posad, near Moscow, with their subsidiaries located at nuclear testing grounds in Semipalatinsk-21 and on Novaya Zemlya Archipelago, and in several other cities (Saint Petersburg, for example). It also maintains a separate research institute tasked with developing nuclear explosions detection technology. Another function of the 12th GU MO is to serve as a link between the Armed Forces and those branches of Soviet/Russian industry and science related to nuclear weapons developing and manufacturing. It is actually the 12th Chief Directorate that develops detailed plans for required nuclear armament and its improvements and places orders for nuclear weapons production before civilian manufacturers.

== Secrecy ==
The 12th GU MO is probably the most secretive organization of the Soviet/Russian Armed Forces, even more than the GRU or the Strategic Rocket Forces. Even though today Russia has become more open and even some articles appear in its mass-media openly describing the "Nuclear Technical Service" Directorate, this organization remains off-limits. However, during Soviet times the most of commissioned officers, even though highly educated ones, had little or no knowledge that the 12th Chief Directorate existed. In the Soviet times it was considered taboo to talk about it outside of secured premises. When talking to strangers, even to other commissioned officers of the Armed Forces, one could only refer to their unit by its coded number. For example, you could say that "I serve as a tank platoon commander at the military unit 31600," but nothing more than that.

Most of officials of the 12th GU MO headquarters wear gunnery uniforms and bear military ranks typical to artillery, since this organization is considered being primarily an "arsenal". However, when it comes to its personnel serving in its remote nuclear arsenal bases, it could wear various military uniforms, ranging from aviation and navy to even tank-crews and marines, because it is a long-time policy, since its creation, of the 12th GU MO to disguise its remote units. During the Cold War, 12th GU MO personnel were also stationed at facilities operated by nuclear-capable units in Warsaw Pact countries, and would often wear the uniforms of the respective armed forces of that country. All service personnel of the 12th GU MO are explicitly forbidden to reveal to anyone, even to their spouses, that they serve in the Nuclear Technical Service, in the 12th Chief Directorate, or that they have anything to do with nuclear weapons. Moreover, a majority of non-essential staff of nuclear arsenal bases do not know that they actually maintain nuclear weapons. Every unit of this organization has its own cover story based on its location and its currently worn uniform and all its personnel must strictly adhere to this story when dealing with strangers. Some bases also use "civilian legends." For example, nuclear arsenal base unit number 62047 in Krasnokamianka, Kizil-Tash, Crimea, was masquerading as a "wine-making enterprise".

Active disinformation measures to this effect are meticulously planned and are regularly conducted not only in order to create a wrong impression among local population and neighbouring military units, but even to misinform conscripts and other unrelated staff serving at actual arsenal bases. For example, tanks and artillery pieces that are maintained as a part of the cover story could be seen by neighbours on daily "routine" exercises in corresponding bogus "tank" or "artillery" regiments. In order to minimize spreading of information about these bases, their commissioned staff was encouraged to serve at one location for as long as possible and not to seek promotions outside their bases (while it was typical for Soviet military in general to move officers every 3–5 years to various places and to promote them exclusively outside of their former military units).

== Nuclear arsenal base structure ==
Each nuclear arsenal base typically consists of the following main services and units:

- Command (that includes the formation's commander and his deputies, chief engineer, chief of staff, chief of political department with their staff, cadres, financial departments, and other administration).
- Engineering-Technical Service or ETS (Russian abbreviation "ITS") – the most important service of the arsenal that actually handles nuclear weapons and deals with end-users. It is subdivided into several departments, bearing names such as "2nd department", "3rd department", "3rd A department", "3rd B department", and similar. Each department deals with specific kinds of nuclear munitions and with specific "customers".
- A separate guards battalion which is similar to an ordinary infantry battalion, but much better trained and equipped. During the Soviet period, these special, highly trained units guarded nuclear weapons sites. Since the Soviet Union's collapse in 1991, security of Russian nuclear weapons installations is mostly entrusted with the elite Vympel special forces unit of the Federal Security Service.
- Automobile transport base.
- Rail-way transport base. It appears that these units were involved with the operation of the RT-23 Molodets rail-launched ICBM system, which entered service in the late 1980s.
- Helicopters and related staff. Helicopters began to be used in the Soviet nuclear forces beginning in the 1970s, permitting quick and rapid transport of personnel and assets - a practice originally pioneered by the US, which had begun using helicopters mainly in its Minuteman missile fields in the early 1960s.
- Tanks and their maintenance base.
- Artillery pieces.
- Signal office centre and various communication units – stationary and mobile ones – all equipped with various automatic communication encrypting systems.
- Separate engineering-technical company (sappers).
- Cryptographic ("8th") department.
- Military counter-intelligence department. Its primary purpose is to prevent sabotage or attacks against nuclear weapons sites.
- Military prosecutor.
- Military hospital.
- Military fire-fighters command.
- School for children.
- Detachment of the "Voentorg" – an organization running various shops and supermarkets within the military and organizing needed supplies.
- Various services concerned with living quarters and other premises maintenance.

== Nuclear arsenal bases functioning and training ==
The main arsenal service, its ETS, and all attached to it transportation and communication detachments, guards, and sappers are subdivided into several so-called Special Tactical Groups (STGs). These were highly mobile units trained to deliver nuclear warheads to designated end-users in various circumstances, including those during ongoing battles and even during unfolding nuclear war. These STGs are mostly based on various automobile transport, but also on rail-way transport, and sometimes, on helicopter transport. Even those auxiliary tanks that are designed to serve as a cover for the arsenal base could be used to reinforce these STGs on their full march.

The 12th Chief Directorate maintains its own secure communication system, independent of others, that links its peace-time and war-time headquarters with all its bases and with other subordinated units. Additional local communication systems of each arsenal base securely link its main command post with its multiple mobile STGs. The main communication system of the 12th GU MO has its own unique coded commands that could be used to instantly transmit orders to elevate readiness and to begin loading, delivering, and issuing nuclear warheads and other nuclear munitions to their end-users. Such commands must be transmitted via at least three different communication channels simultaneously to guarantee their delivery. Delivery of such commands must be practiced at least once a day.

More extended exercises that include execution of alerts of a "higher readiness" and "combat readiness", with actual loading of warheads into transport and dispatching the STGs towards the end-users, must be conducted at least several times per year. All nuclear arsenal bases are linked by their own railways to the vast Russian railway system (nuclear warheads/munitions are being moved from production plants to the 12th Chief Directorate units and between these units usually by railway).

== History ==
The 12th Chief Directorate was formerly known as the "Special Department of the General Staff", and later – as the "6th Directorate of the Ministry of Defense". It has been created on September 4, 1947, based on "KB-11" (in Russian: "КБ-11" - "Design Buhhkkvccreau 11", also known in Russia as off-limits town "Arzamas-16", later "Sarov"); its first chief was Major-General-Engineer (later – full General) Viktor Bolyatko.

The first curator of this organization was Lavrentiy Beria, then chief of the Soviet NKVD. It is widely believed until today that if not for Beria's personal efforts, neither the Nuclear Technical Service, nor actual nuclear weapons would ever be created in the Soviet Union. In fact, it was Beria who spearheaded the campaign for creating the USSR's own nuclear weapons program and who contributed to it, including supplying some nuclear technology stolen by his intelligence service from the United States researchers. For this reason, Beria is considered to the god-father of this organization. Even though for the rest of the Soviet Union Beria was declared an "enemy of the people", relegated to "unperson" status and excluded from the 30-volumed Great Soviet Encyclopedia, he remains a highly revered figure within the off-limits structure of the 12th GU MO, and especially within its scientific research institutions. Beria's portraits and statues are still maintained in some premises and flowers are laid to his statures on his birthdays and on some other occasions. Even in the post-Soviet times when the entire communist past was declared criminal, the alleged "top of the top communist criminal" Lavrentiy Beria continued to enjoy similar reverence among nuclear weapons specialists. For example, the 6-volumes collective work named "Nuclear Testing in the USSR" published few years after the USSR disappearance still features seditious Beria's portrait first in this book, before any other photos.

The 12th Chief Directorate in its current capacity was formed in February 1959. Three years later the Organization managed to effectively and secretly delivered numerous combat-ready nuclear warheads of six different types to Cuba during an infamous strategic Operation Anadyr, a move that resulted in the most dangerous nuclear stand-off between the United States and the Soviet Union. On the next stage of its development the Nuclear Technical Service was headed by General Nikolai Pavlovich Yegorov. The next and the most well-known chief was Marshal of Artillery Yefim Boychuk, who held this position from February 1974 until November 1985 and was credited with transforming the organization into the most effective nuclear weapons protection, delivery, and maintenance system. During his command the 12th GU MO lost its initial "warehouse image" and became a real effective branch of the Soviet Armed Forces, in some respects surpassing by its effectiveness of well-known Soviet special purpose forces such as "Spetsnaz" and the "VDV" (Russian Airborne Troops). The last chief of this organization during the Soviet Union was General Vladimir Gerasimov.

As of 1989 there were the following numbers of tactical nuclear weapons spread across the USSR:

- Russian Federation — 12320
- Ukraine — 2345
- Belorussia — 1180
- Kazakhstan — 330
- Lithuania — 325
- Latvia — 185
- Turkmenistan — 125
- Uzbekistan — 105
- Moldavia — 90
- Georgia — 320
- Estonia — 270
- Armenia — 200
- Tajikistan — 75
- Azerbaijan — 75
- Kyrgyzstan — 75

The 12th Chief Directorate was re-created as a part of Russian Armed Forces on September 2, 1993, by a special order No.68 of the Minister of Defense of the Russian Federation. The first post-soviet chief of the 12th GU MO was General Yevgeny Maslin. In September 1997 he was replaced by General Igor Valynkin. Valynkin was succeeded in December 2005 by Vladimir Verkhovtsev.

== Special Control Service ==
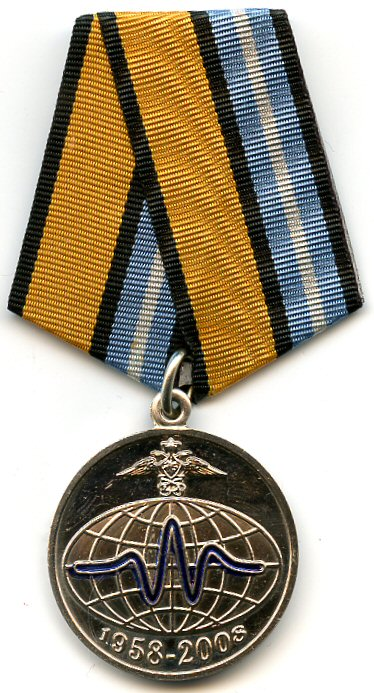
Medal issued in honor of the 50th Anniversary of the Special Control Service

There is a smaller autonomous organization within the main 12th GU MO structure – the Special Control Service (SSK, Russian: Служба Специального Контрола) of the Defense Ministry, Military Unit Number 46179, "atomic intelligence," or "nuclear intelligence" of the former Soviet Union. The Special Control Service is tasked with gathering intelligence on nuclear weapons and particularly on nuclear testing of various adversaries of the former USSR by all means – ranging from six technical control methods to analyzing radio-intercepts and periodicals.

"On March 4, 1954, the Service for Special Monitoring of Nuclear Weapons Tests of the General Staff of the Armed Forces of the USSR was established. In 1957, it was included in the 6th Directorate of the USSR Ministry of Defense. [I]n the 6th Directorate of the USSR Ministry of Defense, two departments were created: scientific and technical and operational and technical, and for the collection and processing of data - the Scientific Computing and Processing Center. Information with primary data on nuclear explosions came to the NVOC from nine laboratories established in 1954–1959. Subsequently, the control network was significantly expanded.

On May 13, 1958, in accordance with the Decree of the Central Committee of the CPSU and the Council of Ministers of the USSR, the Nuclear Explosions Control Service of the USSR Ministry of Defense (since 1960 - SSK of the USSR Ministry of Defense) was created to solve the whole complex of issues of control over nuclear explosions, to which the corresponding departments were transferred to the 6th Directorate of the USSR Ministry of Defense. This day is considered the founding date of the SSC."

The Special Control Service was not a part of the 12th GU MO from very beginning, but was formerly a part of the GRU, its 6th Directorate's department of special observation. In 1958 it was made an independent Special Observation Service of the Defence Ministry. Then it was renamed and re-subordinated first to the Directorate of the Commander of the Chemical Troops of the USSR (the Soviet Armed Forces's Nuclear, Biological, Chemical service), and then again re-subordinated to the 12th GU MO.

The Special Control Service has its own network of military units, named "detection laboratories", each headed by a Colonel, which are situated in many spots inside and outside of the Soviet Union and are all linked to the Service headquarters and to its computation centres by its own secure communication network which is totally independent from the communication network of the 12th GU MO itself.

To mark the 60th anniversary of the Special Control Service, in May 2018, the Ministry of Defence released a video recounting the tasks of the service. Apart from nuclear explosion monitoring for the Russian Government itself, the SCS also coordinates activities by the Russian Federal Government and the Academy of Sciences to carry out Russian obligations to implement the Comprehensive Test Ban Treaty.

In an interview with TASS to mark the 75th anniversary of the 12th Chief Directorate, General Lieutenant (two-star) Igor Kolesnikov, head of the Directorate, said that staff of the Special Control Service "..take part in the implementation of the International Monitoring System (IMS) project, but are also regularly involved in activities as part of the working groups of the Preparatory Commission for the Comprehensive Nuclear-Test-Ban Treaty Organization when discussing the creation of IMS facilities, the development and improvement of operational manuals, and the training of ..personnel."

== Structure of the 12th GU MO ==
The 12th Chief Directorate consists of:

- Directorate of the Chief of the 12th Chief Directorate of the Ministry of Defense – Moscow, Znamenskiy pereulok 19, v/ch 31600. Here is also situated the main archive of the Directorate.
- Military Unit Number (v/ch) 65361 Directorate of State Inspection of Nuclear and Radiological Security – Moscow.
- Military Unit Number (v/ch) 20601 Inspection of Nuclear Security of Atomic devices – Moscow.
- Nuclear Security Maintenance Center – Moscow, B.Znamenskiy pereulok, 15 bld. 1.
- Military Unit Number (v/ch) 77510 6th State Central Polygon [testing ground] (Object 700) – Archangelsk-55 p. Belushia Guba (Novaya Zemlia island), created in 1955.
- v/ch 10569 security testing battalion created in 1954.
- v/ch 39096 security testing battalion created in 1954.
- v/ch 39092 Logistics Base (logistics-technical maintenance) – Severodvinsk
- v/ch 40800 Auto transport Base
- v/ch 09607
- v/ch 10944
- v/ch 52605 2nd GNIP OL (maintenance unit for nuclear testing ground, known as "polygon") – Semipalatinsk-21, Kurchatov city (Jana-Semei train station); created in 1948 in Zvenigorod, near Moscow, disbanded in 1994.
- 217th engineering construction battalion
- 497th separate communication battalion (cable)
- v/ch 32130 US - Mojaisk-3
- v/ch 2585 – Nuclear Waste Burial Center – Tula-50
- v/ch 31650 NIC [Scientific Research Center] SSK – Moscow Rubcovsko-Dvorcovaya, 2
- v/ch 70170 NIC Technical Systems Security [maritime subsidiary of 12th CNII] Sankt-Petersburg, Novoselkovskaya, 39
- v/ch 14258 84th UTC (Training Center) interservice – Sergiev Posad, p. Sharapovo (Loza)
- Logistics Base (construction materials) – Sergiev Posad
- UTC (training center) anti-sabotage – Sergiev Posad-7 p. Ferma
- v/ch 32369 1080th CVG (Central Military Hospital) (Sergiev Posad-7 p. Ferma)
- v/ch 32369 1137th Military Hospital (Sergiev Posad-7)
- Arsenal VG
- v/ch 14254, v/ch 65154 Borisoglebsk p. Gribanovskiy (Voronej-45)
- v/ch 14436 Mojaisk-10
- v/ch 14439, v/ch 42621 Olenegorsk-2 p. Ramozero
- v/ch 33796 Vologda-20 railway station Chebsora
- v/ch 33927, v/ch 33915 Engels p. Berezovka (Saratov-63)
- v/ch 33951 Trehgornyi-1 Drujby, 2
- v/ch 34088 Khabarovsk-47 p. Korfovskiy
- v/ch 42685 Briansk-18 p. Rjanica
- v/ch 42615 v/ch 62047 Feodosia-13 p. Krasnokamenka (Simferopol-99)
- v/ch 33826 Nalchik-20 p. Zvezdnyi
- v/ch 34037 Graivoron p. Golovchino (Belgorod-22)
- v/ch 65163 Tula-50
- v/ch 40247 v/ch 32136 – Lesnoy p. Nijniaya Tura (Sverdlovsk-45)
- v/ch 52328 Sebej-5 p. Sosnovyi Bor
- v/ch 65152 Kirovograd-25 p. Alexandrovka
- v/ch 21066 Priozersk city Leningradskaya oblast OBOP (separate maintenance battalion)
- v/ch 01001 Priozersk city Leningradskaya oblast ODVK
- v/ch 52690 Moscow
- v/ch 49719 p. Gromovo Leningradskaya oblast

=== List of arsenals ===
(in 1990 - over 20, in 2005 - 14)

- Military Unit Number (v/ch) 01154 Severomorsk (p. Shuk-Ozero) Murmansk Arsenal of Naval Aviation of the Northern Fleet
- v/ch 12474 Makarov Jitomirskaya oblast Ukraine Arsenal of Strategic Rocket Forces (relocated)
- v/ch 12529 Arsenal of Moscow Anti-Aircraft Defense District (disbanded)
- v/ch 14427 Kirovograd-25 p. Alexandrovka object 341 Ukraine 4 Arsenal OBKZ Strategic Rocket Forces – created in 1960 (relocated)
- v/ch 14428 Tula-50 Tula Arsenal of Strategic Rocket Forces (disbanded in 1999)
- v/ch 19089 Tver city - Tver Arsenal of Strategic Rocket Forces
- v/ch 22972 Kolomna p. Belushia Guba (Novaya Zemlia Island) UC VMF (Navy training center), disbanded in 1998.
- v/ch 25026 Liepaia (Laboratorias street), p. Paplaka, Latvia (disbanded)
- v/ch 25595 Nalchik-20 p. Zvezdnyi, KBAR – Arsenal (disbanded)
- v/ch 25623 Engels p. Berezovka v/g 12/63 Krasnoarmeiskoe (Saratov-63) object 1050 Saratov Arsenal of Strategic Rocket Forces - 2003
- v/ch 25624 Graivoron p. Golovino (Belgorod-22) – Belgorod Arsenal of Air Force
- v/ch 25625 Khabarovsk-47 p. Korfovskiy – Khabarovsk Arsenal of Strategic Rocket Forces
- v/ch 25850 Balezino-3 Udmurtskaya Oblast – 29th Arsenal of Strategic Rocket Forces
- v/ch 26219 Kirov p. Shaikovka – Kaluga Arsenal of Long-Range Aviation
- v/ch 26942 Viliuchinsk p. Primorskiy – Kamchatka Arsenal of the Pacific Fleet
- v/ch 31759 Cheliabinsk-115 p. Karabash – Cheliabinsk Arsenal (disbanded)
- v/ch 32181 Vologda-20 railway station Chebosara – Vologda Arsenal of Strategic Rocket Forces
- v/ch 32948 Arsenal (disbanded)
- v/ch 39995 Irkutsk-45 p. Zalari v/g 12/45 railway station Golovinskaya – Irkutsk Arsenal of Strategic Rocket Forces (created in 1996)
- v/ch 40247 Lesnoy p. Nijniaya Tura (Sverdlovsk-45) Object 917 – Sverdlovsk Arsenal of Strategic Rocket Forces
- v/ch 41013 Trehgornyi-1 (Zlatoust-30) Object 936 – Cheliabinsk Arsenal
- v/ch 41065 Svobodnyi-21 p. Orlinyi – Amur Arsenal of Strategic Rocket Forces (disbanded in 1996)
- v/ch 42615 Feodosia-13 p. Krasnokamenka (Kyzyl-Tash) Ukrainian Arsenal of the Black See Fleet (disbanded)
- v/ch 23476 Smolenskaya Oblast, Pochinkovskiy Rayon.
- v/ch 42616 Ivano-Frankovsk-16 – Ukrainian Arsenal
- v/ch 42635 – Sverdlovsk Arsenal
- v/ch 42644 Sebej-5 p. Sosnovyi Bor - Pskov Arsenal of the Baltic Fleet (disbanded in 1997)
- v/ch 42646 Novgorod-17 – Novgorod Arsenal
- v/ch 42654 Gomel-30 – Belorussian Arsenal of Strategic Rocket Forces
- v/ch 42685 Briansk-18 p. Rjanica – Briansk Arsenal of Anti-Aircraft Defense /Arsenal of Air Force /
- v/ch 51966 Jeleznogorsk p. Dodonovo (Krasnoyarsk-26) Object 980 - Krasnoyarsk Arsenal of Strategic Rocket Forces (created in 1954)
- v/ch 51989 Ivano-Frankovsk - Ukrainian Arsenal of Strategic Rocket Forces
- v/ch 52025 Mojaisk-10 Mira – Moscow Arsenal of Anti-Aircraft Defense
- v/ch 62834 Olenegorsk – Murmansk Arsenal
- v/ch 75414 Anadyr-1 p. Gudym (Magadan-11) – Chukotka Arsenal of Long-Range Aviation (disbanded in 1979) 2008 photos of this object could be seen here:
- v/ch 77417 Kolomna, Krasnoarmeiskaya, 100 - UC VMF (Training Center of the Navy)
- v/ch 81388 Shkotovo-22 p. Dunai – Primorsk. Arsenal of the Pacific Fleet
- v/ch 90534 Niandoma v/g Kargopol-2 – Archangelsk Arsenal of Strategic Rocket Forces (disbanded)
- v/ch 95131 Ostrov-2 – Pskov Arsenal of Naval Aviation of the Baltic Fleet (disbanded in 1992)
- Svobodnyi-21 p. Orlinyi v/g 16 – Amur Arsenal of Air Force (disbanded in 1996)
- Object 713 – Arsenal
- Borovec, Bulgaria – Bulg. Arsenal (disbanded in 1989)
- Borisoglebsk p. Gribanovskiy v/g 308 (Voronej-45) - Voronej Arsenal of Air Force
- Stepnogorsk p. Adjibay Object 138 – Kazakh. Arsenal of Strategic Rocket Forces (disbanded)
- Bagrationovsk – Kaliningradsk. Arsenal of the Baltic Fleet
- Olenegorsk-8 p. Vysokiy – Murmansk Arsenal (created in 1984)
- Kurskaya railway station – Stavropol Arsenal of Long-Range Aviation (created in 1957, disbanded in.1992)
- Surgut - Tumen Arsenal
- Balaklava Object 820 – Ukrainian Arsenal
- Ukrainian Arsenal – Jitomirskaya Oblast
- Ukrainian Arsenal – Volynskaya
- Ukrainian Arsenal – Lvovskaya
- Object 341 – Ukrainian Arsenal KZ
- Ukrainian Arsenal of Strategic Rocket Forces – Khmelnickaya
- p. Ak-Burun (Crimean Peninsula) – Ukrainian Arsenal of the Black Sea Fleet (disbanded)
- Amursk p. Bolon – Khabarovsk Arsenal of the Navy
- Ust-Katav p. Viazovaya – Cheliabinsk Arsenal
- Grozny-20 Chechnia – Arsenal of Strategic Rocket Forces (disbanded)

=== Special Control Service ===
- 170th Operational-Coordination Center (170th OKC) of the Special Control Service (SSK) of the Ministry of Defense (v/ch 46179) Moscow, Rubcovsko-Dvorcovaya street, 2 (also Matrosskaya Tishina street, 10), created 13.05.1958 as a part of the GRU.
- Command Post /Reserved Command Post SSK (v/ch 63679) Moscow, Matrosskaya Tishina street, 10 / Sergiev Posad p. Sharapovo – – detached from the main SSK headquarters (v/ch 46179) into a separate operational unit in 1987. Composition: 844th Command Post if the 170th Operational-Coordination Center SSK, Reserve Command Post SSK, 1056th Main and Reserved Signal Office Centres SSK, main and reserved computer centres SSK, and also a radio-transmitting centre, remote seismic post and remote group of universal time in p. Sharapovo (three later formerly belonged to the Podolsk SSK Laboratory)
- Malin – Ukrainian SSK Laboratory, Jitomirskaya Oblast
- v/ch 14167 Makarov-1 Ukrainian 12th SSK Laboratory, Kievskaya Oblast
- v/ch 54286 Maili-Sai – Kirgiz SSK Laboratory; created in 1974
- Norilsk – Krasnoyarsk SSK Laboratory
- p. Khabaz – ASP
- v/ch 22158 p. Borovoe – Kazakh SSK Laboratory (from 1974)
- v/ch pp 76515 Ulan-Bataar – Mongolian SSK Laboratory (Expeditionary Group) (from 1974; disbanded)
- v/ch 86665 Bilibino, Chukotka
- v/ch 14024 Kamenets-Podolski-16; from 1994 till 2004 – Ukrainian SSK Laboratory, from 2004 - PN, Khmelnitskaya Oblast
- v/ch 14053 Semipalatinsk – Kazakh 9th SSK Laboratory
- v/ch ... ... Aktubinsk – Kazakh separate SSK group
- v/ch 13987 railway station Stolbovaya, Moscow Oblast – Podolsk SSK Laboratory
- v/ch 14169 Balta, Odessa Oblast – Ukrainian SSK Laboratory (SSK Training Center)
- v/ch 26154 Priozersk – SPb SSK Laboratory
- v/ch 29475 p. Urgal-2 (BAM region) – Khabarovsk SSK Laboratory
- v/ch 30030 Lensk p. Peleduy – Yakutsk SSK Laboratory
- v/ch 41007 Ussuriysk p. Grigorievka, Lermontova 33 – Primorsk. SSK Laboratory
- v/ch 41056 Kirov p. Bakhta + p. Khaibulino (Bashk.) – Kirov SSK Laboratory (created in 1954)
- v/ch 41094 Yujno-Sakhalinsk-5 p. Sputnik-2 – Sakhalinsk. 3rd SSK Laboratory (created in 1954)
- v/ch 41097 P-K p. Rodygino – Kamchatka SSK Laboratory + remote seismic post "Nachiki" in p. Tundrovyi
- v/ch pp 42626 Sukhumi p. Nijniaya Eshera + p. Kheivani – 24th Abkhazian SSK Laboratory (created in 2000 as v/ch 96211)
- v/ch 77031 Zarinsk p. Zalesovo – Altay SSK Laboratory
- v/ch 96211 Dubna p. Alexandrovka, NCD (created in 1988)
- v/ch 31650 Moscow Rubcovsko-Dvorcovaya street, 2 – NII SSK (SSK scientific research institute). Removed from the SSK headquarters (v/ch 46179) subordination and re-subordinated directly to the 12th Chief Directorate (v/ch 31600) in 1988.
- Cuba, Lurdez – autonomous seismic post SSK
- Antarctica – autonomous seismic post SSK

=== 626 battalion SN ===
- v/ch 14118 Sergiev Posad (formerly Zagorsk) p. Abramovo Moscow Oblast
- v/ch 42635 Sverdlovsk (now Yekaterinburg)
- v/ch 42663 Suzdal p. Sokol Moscow Oblast
- v/ch 44806 Gatchina, SPb
- v/ch 64178 Moscow, Miasnitskaya 3 + Ulanskiy pereulok 11 (Derbenevo) Moscow Oblast
- v/ch 69273 Snejnogorsk Murmansk Enterprise

=== Arsenals ===
In the former USSR there were 102 Special Objects ("Objects «C»") to keep nuclear munitions:

- v/ch ..... — Object «С» Krasnogorsk-25
- v/ch ..... — Object «С» Vladimir-21
- v/ch 14427 — 341 Object «С» Kirovograd-25
- v/ch ..... — Object «С» 713 ()
- v/ch 40274 — 917 Object «С» Sverdlovsk-45 (Lesnoy)
- v/ch ..... — Object «С» 820 Balaklava
- v/ch 41013 — 943 Object «С» Trehgornyi-1 (Zlatoust-30) (Dalniy)
- v/ch 51966 — Object «С» 980 Krasnoyarsk-26 (Jeleznogorsk)
- v/ch ..... — 1050 Object «С» (Saratov Oblast)
- v/ch ..... — Object «С» Briansk-18 ()
- v/ch 25624 — Object «С» Belgorod-22 () v/ch 25624 v/ch 34037
- v/ch 12474 — 332 Object «С» Makarov-1 (Kiev, Jitomir)
- v/ch ..... — Object «С» Sebej-5 (Sosnovyi Bor) Pskov Oblast v/ch 42644 v/ch 52328
- v/ch 62047 — Object «С» Simferopol-32 (Feodosia-13) Kizil-Tash Krasnokamenka
- v/ch 90534 — Object «С» Kargopol-2 () Niandoma town, Primorsk Rayon, Archangelsk Oblast
- v/ch 25625 — Object «С» Khabarovsk-47 () Korfovskiy
- v/ch 25851 v/ch 40852 v/ch 01073 — Object «С» Tula-50 () Arsenievsk Rayon Tula Oblast
- v/ch ..... — Object «С» Cheliabinsk-115 () Karabash
- v/ch 14254 — Object «С» Voronej-45 ()
- v/ch 75414 — Object «С» Anadyr-1 (Magadan-11) Gudym
- v/ch 39995 — Object «С» Irkutsk-45 () railway station Golovinskaya, Zalarinsk Rayon Irkutsk Oblast
- v/ch ..... — Object «С» Engels-1 ()
- v/ch 52015 — Object «С» Komsomolsk-on-Amur-31 () P.Parim 50.267564°N 137.466602°E
- v/ch 62834 — Object «С» Olenegorsk-2 ()
- v/ch 25594 — Object «С» Vologda-20 () Vologda Oblast
- v/ch 77417 — Object «С» ...
- v/ch 52605 — Object «С» ...
- v/ch 42654 — Object «С» ...
- v/ch 32130 — Object «С» Mojaisk-3 Moscow К-510 125th km of Moscow-Minsk highway ()
- v/ch 27837 — Object «С» Bykhov-1 city Mogilev Oblast, Belarus — Arsenal of Naval Aviation of the Baltic Fleet

== See also ==
- Real photos of disbanded "Object Gudym"-dead link (August 2008) – the closest to the United States territory nuclear arsenal base (Anadyr, Chukotka).
