= Peacekeeper Rail Garrison =

United States Air Force railcar-launched ICBM

Coordinates: 39.786346°N 84.106366°W

Peacekeeper Rail Garrison Car
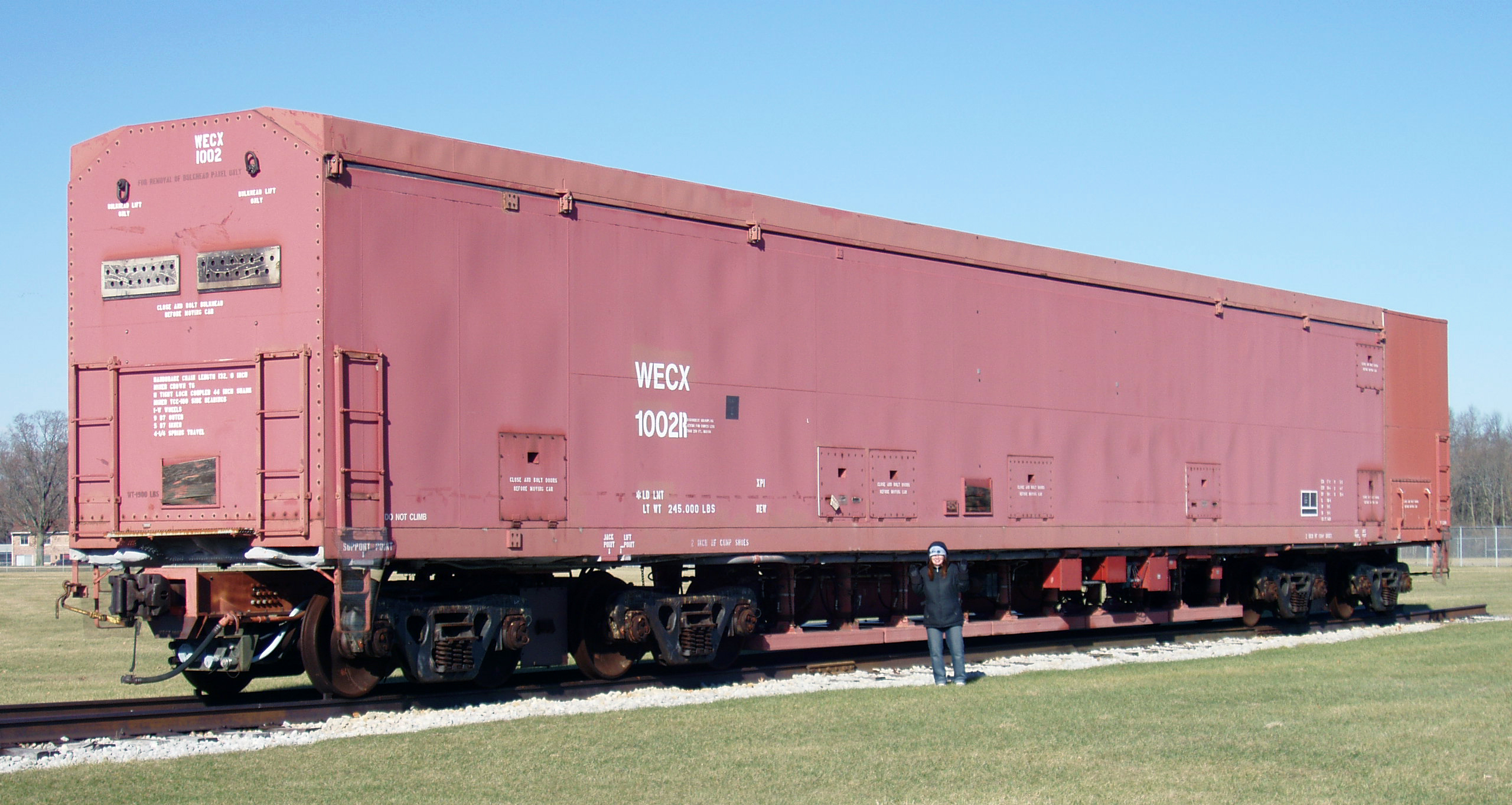
- In service: 1990–1991
- Manufacturer: Rockwell International
- Number built: 2
- Number preserved: 1
- Fleet numbers: WECX 1001-1002
- Capacity: One LGM-118A ICBM
- Operator: United States Air Force

Specifications
- Car body construction: St. Louis Refrigerator Car Company
- Car length: 87 ft (26.52 m)
- Width: 10 ft 4 in (3.15 m)
- Height: 15 ft 9 in (4.80 m)
- Weight: 550,000 lb (250,000 kg) or 275 short tons (246 long tons; 249 t)
- Bogies: 4 × 4-wheel
- Coupling system: H Tightlock
- Track gauge: 1,435 mm (4 ft 8 1/2 in) standard gauge

The Peacekeeper Rail Garrison was a railcar-launched ICBM that was developed by the United States Air Force during the 1980s as part of a plan to place fifty MGM-118A Peacekeeper intercontinental ballistic missiles on the rail network of the United States. The railcars were intended, in case of increased threat of nuclear war, to be deployed onto the nation's rail network to avoid being destroyed by a first strike counterforce attack by the Soviet Union. However, the plan was canceled as part of defense cutbacks following the end of the Cold War, and the Peacekeeper missiles were installed in silo launchers as LGM-118s instead.

== Development ==
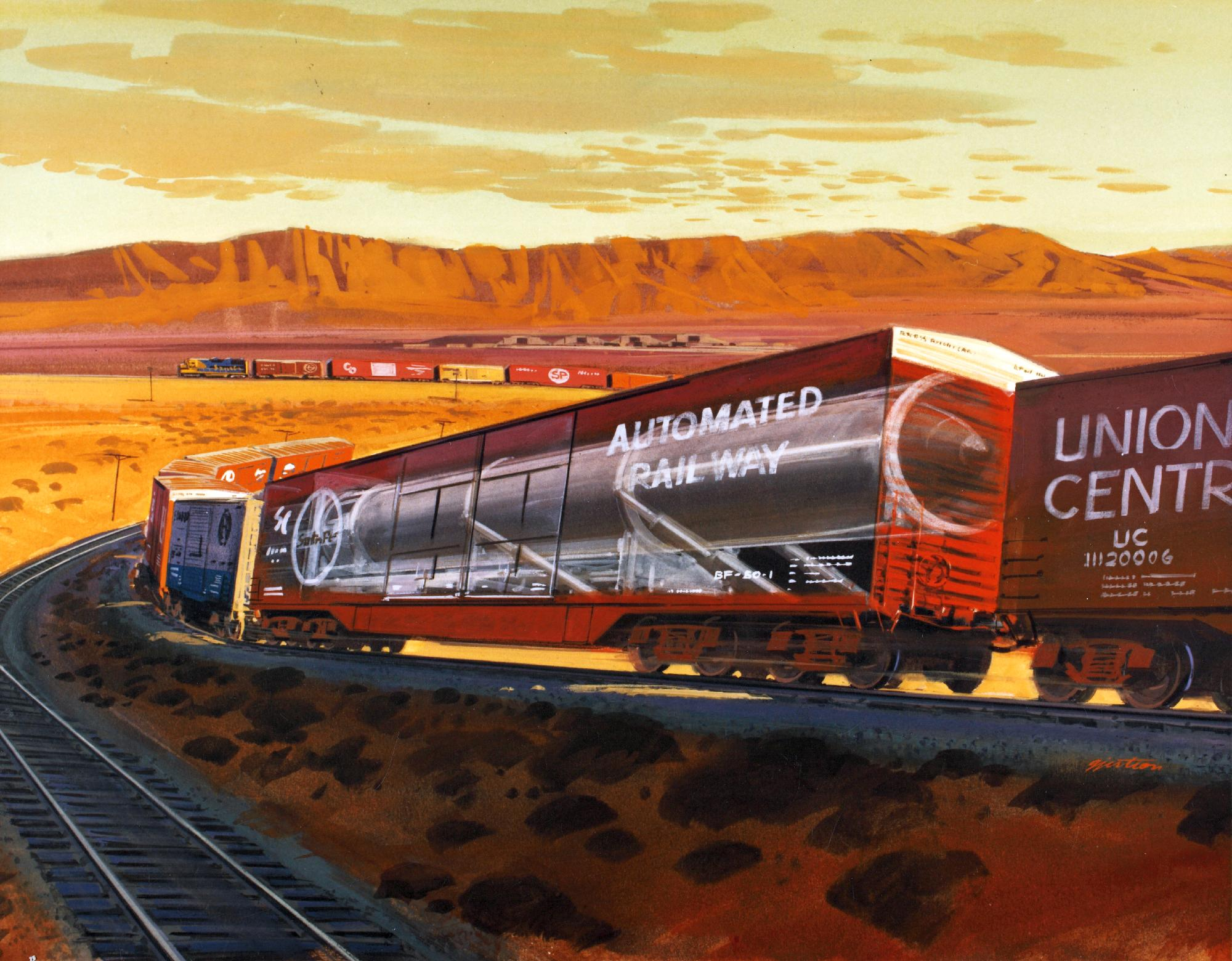
Train pulling the Garrison car, which would be painted to resemble a standard rail car. (Missile hidden inside)

On December 19, 1986, the White House announced that U.S. President Ronald Reagan had given approval to a plan for the development of a railroad-based system for basing part of the planned LGM-118 Peacekeeper – originally referred to as MX for "Missile, Experimental" – intercontinental ballistic missile (ICBM) force. Intended to increase the survivability of the force in the event of a counterforce nuclear attack by the Soviet Union, the 50 train-based missile launchers, fitted two to each of twenty-five trains, would supplement a force of 50 silo-based missiles that would replace existing Minuteman missiles. (Note: Air launch and mobile dispersion in trenches were also considered as basing options for the MX missile.)

Each train was planned to consist of two locomotives (appeared to be EMD GP40-2 in unclassified diagrams), two cars for housing security forces (using a modified box car), two launchers each holding a single missile (using a modified box car), a launch control car (using a modified Westinghouse box car), a fuel car, and a maintenance car (using a modified box car). Each launching car would carry one missile in a tube that, upon the receipt of an authenticated firing command, would elevate to fire the missile from the bed of the car. The launch cars were 87 feet (26.52 m) long, and when loaded with a missile weighed over 550,000 pounds (250,000 kg) or 275 short tons (246 long tons; 249 t). A crew of 42 people—including the train commander, four launch control officers, four railroad engineers, one medic, six maintenance personnel, and 26 security police—could live in the launch control and security cars for up to one month.

Following testing in 1989 at Hudson, CO, two ex-CSX locomotives, an EMD GP40-2 and an EMD GP38-2, were sent to Precision National in Mount Vernon, IL for modification to GP40-2DE (Dynamic braking, Extended range) with bulletproof glass in the cab windows. The trains were expected to be in service within about two years. Strategic Air Command wanted the first trains stationed at F. E. Warren Air Force Base near the Union Pacific mainline at Cheyenne, WY. The expected in-service date was December 1992. Rail Garrisons would resemble small freight yards with four spurs leading to slant-sided steel and earthen hardened shelters to house the trains.

Two hi-cube boxcars were constructed by St Louis Refrigerator Car Company. They were modified at Westinghouse, receiving bogie trucks, distributing their 550,000 pounds (250,000 kg) of weight over 8 axles. Low-slung beams were added to the underside to level the car against the track during launch. 80-foot (24.38 m) roof panels were designed to fall off when the missile was erected. The Air Force sought US$2.16 billion in fiscal year 1991 to purchase the first seven MX trains.

The deployment plan called for the trains to be permanently based in shelters that would be constructed on Strategic Air Command bases throughout the United States, with the missile crews on continuous alert. Ten bases were in the running; Fairchild Air Force Base (Spokane, WA), Malmstrom Air Force Base (Great Falls, MT), Minot Air Force Base (Minot, ND), Grand Forks Air Force Base (Grand Forks, ND), Dyess Air Force Base (Abilene, TX), Whiteman Air Force Base, (Knob Noster, MO), Blytheville Air Force Base (Blytheville, AR), Little Rock Air Force Base (Little Rock, AR), Barksdale Air Force Base (Shreveport, LA), and Wurtsmith Air Force Base (Oscoda, MI). Upon the receipt of a signal indicating an increase in alert level, the trains would be "flushed", dispersing onto the American railroad network, thus making it difficult for an enemy to determine where the missiles were at any given time to target them.

Major contractors for the rail garrison system were Boeing Aerospace Corporation, Westinghouse Marine Division and Rockwell International Autonetics. The proposed main garrison for the weapons deployment system was to be F.E. Warren Air Force Base in Wyoming, with each selected garrison hosting up to four trains.

== Testing and termination ==
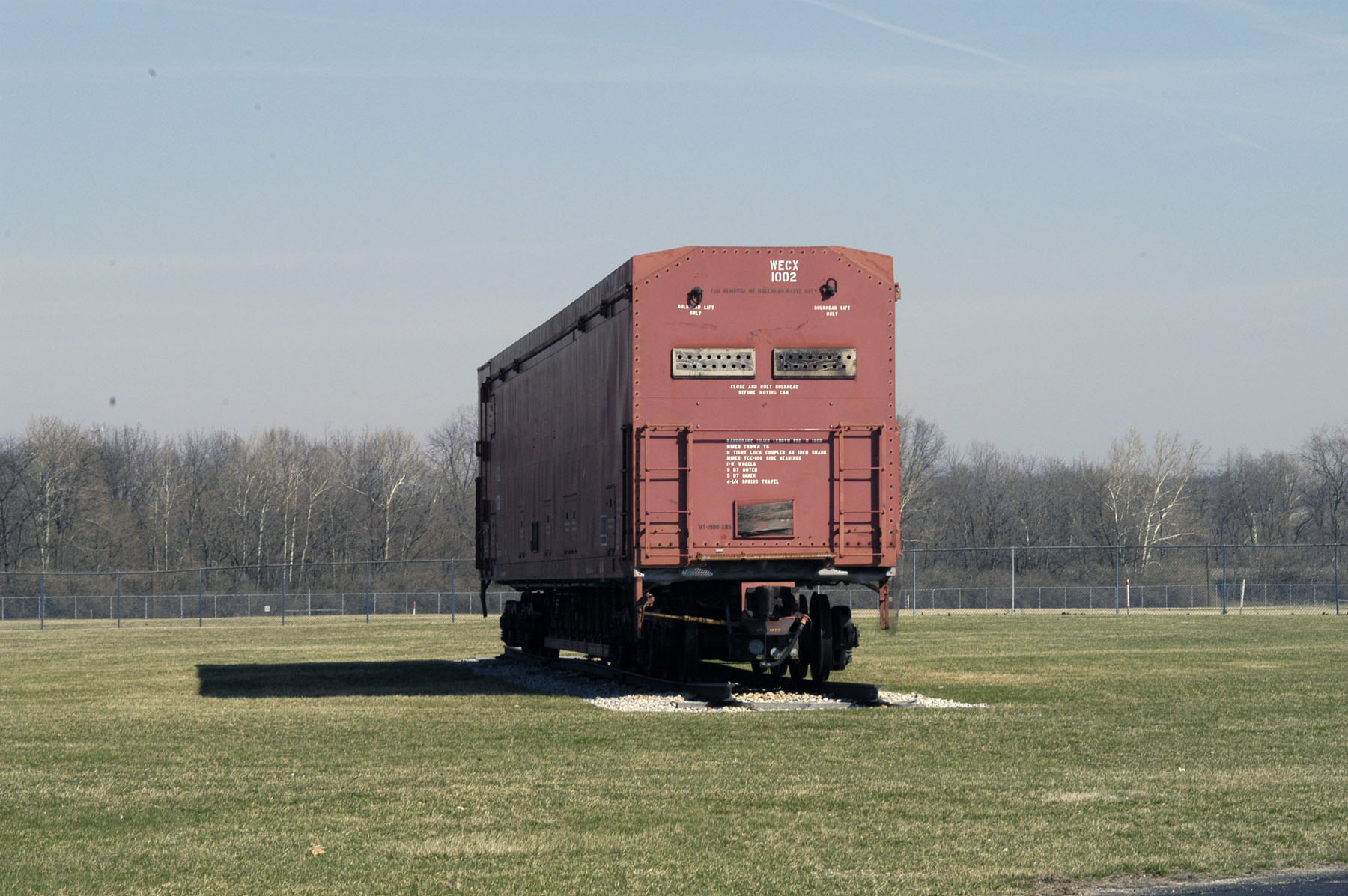
End view of the prototype Rail Garrison Car

After several years of development, the prototype Rail Garrison Car was delivered to the U.S. Air Force on October 4, 1990. After undergoing initial evaluation at Vandenberg Air Force Base, the car was then sent to the Transportation Test Center in Pueblo, Colorado for further testing on the Association of American Railroads' test track.

In 1991, with the end of the Cold War, the Peacekeeper rail garrison system was canceled. As a result, all operational Peacekeeper missiles produced were installed in former Minuteman silos. Following termination, the prototype rail garrison car was delivered to the National Museum of the United States Air Force at Wright-Patterson Air Force Base, Ohio, in 1994 for public display.

Rail Garrison Assets at Vandenberg AFB
Car	Reporting Mark	VAFB Arrival	VAFB Departure	Gaining Agency
Locomotive OM-1	TBCX 4900	28 Aug 1991	8 Jan 1992	U.S. Army, Ft Eustis, Virginia
Locomotive OM-2	TBCX 4901	28 Aug 1991	8 Jan 1992	U.S. Army, Ft Eustis, Virginia
Fuel Car EM-1	TBCX 90001	16 Apr 1991	?	USAF, Eielson AFB, Alaska
Fuel Car OM-1	TBCX 90002	21 Oct 1991	8 Jan 1992	U.S. Army, Ft Eustis, Virginia
Maintenance Car EM-1	TBCX 90050	16 Apr 1991	?	USAF, Eielson AFB, Alaska
Maintenance Car OM-1	TBCX 90051	21 Oct 1991	8 Jan 1992	U.S. Army, Ft Eustis, Virginia
Security Car EMS-1	DAFX 0004	16 Apr 1991	?	USAF, Eielson AFB, Alaska
Security Car EMS-2	DAFX 0003	16 Apr 1991	?	USAF, Eielson AFB, Alaska
Launch Control Car EMS-1	HTCX 402, DAFX 0002	16 Apr 1991	?	Federal Railroad Administration, Transportation Test Center
Launch Control Car ESM-2	RGX 100, DAFX 0001	13 Oct 1990	?	USAF, Eielson AFB, Alaska
Launch Control Car OM-2	DAFX 0006	29 Oct 1991	?	USAF, Eielson AFB, Alaska
Launch Control Car OM-4	HTCX 407, DAFX 0007	3 Jul 1991	?	Federal Railroad Administration, Transportation Test Center
Missile Launch Car EMS-1	WECX 1003	25 Nov 1991	?	Federal Railroad Administration, Transportation Test Center
Missile Launch Car EM-1	WECX 1002	21 Nov 1991	?	USAF Museum, Dayton Ohio
Missile Launch Car EM-2	WECX 1001	31 May 1990	?	Federal Railroad Administration, Transportation Test Center
Flat Car	?	16 Oct 1990	?	Federal Railroad Administration, Transportation Test Center
Security Car	DAFX 0008	n/a	n/a	?
Security Car	DAFX 0009	n/a	n/a	?

== See also ==
- BZhRK Barguzin
- LGM-30 Minuteman
- Minuteman Mobility Test Train - preceding pilot scale development in the 1960s.
- Railway gun
- RT-23 Molodets - equivalent operational Soviet system.
- Transporter erector launcher - A road-mobile missile launcher.
- White Train
