= BZhRK Barguzin =

Barguzin BZhRK
- Type: Intercontinental ballistic missile
- Place of origin: Russia

Service history
- In service: In development
- Used by: Russian Strategic Rocket Forces

Production history
- Designer: Moscow Institute of Thermal Technology
- Manufacturer: Votkinsk Machine Building Plant, Krasnoyarsk Machine-Building Plant, KBKhA, CKB Titan

Specifications
- Mass: 45–50 ton per missile
- Length: 20–30 m
- Warhead: ≤ 10 to 16, var. TNW (MIRV MaRV HGV other, 6x ≤ 15x yield ≤ 960 kt to 100 kt, 1 - 4 to 8 yield 200 kt to ≤ 1 - 3 Mt each or single RV ≤ 5 - 16 Mt)
- Engine: Three-stage solid-fuel rocket or 3rd, 4th (warhead) liquid
- Propellant: Solid, third or fourth stage – warhead block can be liquid like other ICBM SLBM active or project test other
- Operational range: 12,600 km (7,800 mi)
- Guidance system: Inertial with GLONASS, astrocelestial
- Launch platform: Railway train TEL

The RS-27 (?) or SS-X-32Zh (?) Barguzin BZhRK (БЖРК) Project is a rail-mobile intercontinental ballistic missile (ICBM) under development for the Russian RVSN, as a replacement of the previous railway missile train Molodets BZhRK SS-24 Scalpel. BZhRK stands for railway strategic missile train. The missile was expected to enter testing in 2019 and enter service in 2020.

The Barguzin “railroad combat complex", or BZhRK, will be armed with six RT-## (the missile will be based on Yars, Bulava, RT-23MU, Rubezh Avangard, maybe partially from RT20PUZh, R-39 Rif and R-39M developments) ICBMs, a fifty-five-ton missile that reportedly carries up to 4 nuclear warheads, and is already deployed in fixed silos and mobile truck-mounted launchers. There will be five railroad missile regiments, each consisting of one train and six ballistic missiles. Operational deployment is slated for 2020.

Unlike its decommissioned Soviet counterpart, the RT-23 Molodets (the SS-24 Mod-3 Scalpel), the new train carrying ICBMs will be much lighter, due to the use of the more compact RS-24 Yars ICBM, so that distinguishing it from an ordinary freight train will be impossible.

In December 2017, the Russian state media reported that the project has been frozen due to a lack of financing, saying that the weapon was too expensive. However, the report also states that the project can be quickly revived if necessary.

== See also ==
- Strategic Missile Troops
- RT-23 Molodets – (Soviet Union)
- RS-24 Yars – (Russia)
- RS-26 Rubezh – (Russia)
- RS-28 Sarmat – (Russia)
- R-36 (missile) – (Soviet Union)
- UR-100N – (Soviet Union)
- RT-2PM Topol – (Soviet Union)
- RT-2PM2 Topol-M – (Russia)
- Agni-VI – (India)
- Peacekeeper Rail Garrison Car
- LGM-30 Minuteman – (United States)
- DF-5 – (China)
- DF-41 – (China)
