= Vladimir Gerasimov (general) =

Soviet colonel general (1931–2021)

Vladimir Ivanovich Gerasimov
- Владимир Иванович Герасимов
- Born: 19 September 1931; Lebyazhye-2, Lebyazhyevsky District, Ural Oblast, Russian SFSR, USSR
- Died: 19 May 2021 (aged 89); Moscow, Russia
- Military career
- Allegiance: Soviet Union; Russia
- Branch: Soviet Tank Forces; Soviet Strategic Missile Forces
- Service years: 1949–1992
- Rank: Colonel General
- Commands: 31st Rocket Army; 12th Chief Directorate
- Awards: Order of Lenin; Order of the Red Star; Order "For Service to the Homeland in the Armed Forces of the USSR", 2nd and 3rd classes

Vladimir Ivanovich Gerasimov (Russian: Владимир Иванович Герасимов; 19 September 1931 – 19 May 2021) was a Soviet colonel general. He headed the 12th Chief Directorate between 1985 and 1992. He received several awards, including the Order of Lenin and Order of the Red Star.

Gerasimov died in Moscow on 19 May 2021, aged 89.
