= 13th Red Banner Rocket Division =

13th Orenburg Red Banner Rocket Division
- Active: 1964–present
- Country: Soviet Union (1964–1991); Russia (1991–present)
- Branch: Strategic Rocket Forces
- Garrison/HQ: Yasny, Orenburg Oblast
- Decorations: Order of the Red Banner

Commanders
- Current commander: Colonel Yevgeny V. Konovalenkov

The 13th Orenburg Red Banner Rocket Division (Military Unit Number 68545) is a military formation of the 31st Rocket Army, Strategic Missile Forces, located in the closed city of Yasny, Komarovsky, Orenburg Oblast.

The deployment site for the division was chosen specifically for the location of the R-36 intercontinental ballistic missile.

== History ==
In 1964–1965 when the division began to form, the city of Yasny (transl: Clear) had not yet been formed. There was a small settlement builders of the future and Orenburgasbest. Next to it was district center Dombarovsky, where all mail, cargo, and so on were initially addressed. Therefore, in all the documents and V/Chs for the division it was written: Dombarovsky, Orenburg Oblast. A military townlet of the division and the entire infrastructure were placed next to the plant under construction, as there was already a railway branch line, which greatly simplified all construction work. Over time, the village built up into the city of Yasny. Hence, some people get confused: either Dombarovsky or Yasny. Documents coming into the division sometimes have one and the other mailing address.

The SRF formation in Yasny began as Operation Group Dombarovskiy in May 1964. Headquarters 13th Rocket Division was formed in April 1965, as part of the 5th Independent Rocket Corps. However the division was quickly (within two months) transferred to the 18th Independent Rocket Corps, and then in 1970 to the 31st Rocket Army. Major-General Dmitry Kharitonovich Chaplygin was the first division commander, from May 1964 until August 1970.

In 2004 the division gained the 'Orenburg' honorific.

== Commanders ==
Commanders of the 13th Rocket Division
No.	Name	From	To
1	Major General Dimitry Kh. Chaplygin	1964	1970
2	Major General Yuri N. Sergunin	1970	1974
3	Major General Remus V. Markitan	1974	1977
4	Major General Tal-At A. Memyetov	1977	1982
5	Major General Igor N. Valynkin	1982	1984
6	Major General Vladimir I. Negashev	1984	1989
7	Major General Viktor A. Vakulenko	1989	1991
8	Major General Aleksander I. Voronin	1991	1995
9	Major General Vladimir I. Vigovskoy	1995	1998
10	Major General Vladimir A. Kirillov	1998	2001
11	Major General Yuri I. Sklyar	2001	2004
12	Major General Aleksei D. Konnov	2004	2007
13	Colonel Aleksander V. Kasyanenko	2007	2010
14	Colonel Yevgeny V. Konovalenkov	2010	present

== Structure ==
Structure of the unit as of 2019:

- 175th Rocket Regiment (Military Unit No. 26164)
- 368th Rocket Regiment (Military Unit No. 07393)
- 494th Rocket Regiment (Military Unit No. 39986)
- 621st Rocket Regiment (Military Unit No. 34074)
- 767th Rocket Regiment (Military Unit No. 21424)
