= Minuteman Mobility Test Train =

1960s US Air Force missile deployment project

A Minuteman Mobility Test Train was a railway train which carried LGM-30 Minuteman intercontinental ballistic missiles for the United States Air Force. It tested Strategic Air Command's deployment of planned trains for launching the ICBMs. Moving the ICBMs by rail might reduce their vulnerability to Soviet Strategic Rocket Forces attack. At the time, the trains had the heaviest railroad cars used on regular rail routes, and rail sidings were surveyed during the trains' 1960 Operation Big Star (surveyed sites were subsequently used in 1961 by different SAC trains for evaluating bomber accuracy.)

== Operation Big Star ==
Operation Big Star was a series of US military exercises using 4 trains (of 6 planned) from the Hill Air Force Base rail terminal over "21 railroads in the Northwest and Midwest" during summer 1960. The US Air Force Ballistic Missile Division conducted the tests while SAC had operational control of the trains with a "SAC task force" in Utah and on the train, military personnel and "civilian engineering, maintenance and logistic representatives" (the last 3 of the 6 planned trains were to leave from Des Moines, Iowa).

21–27 June train
The 1st train of 14 cars left Hill AFB for routes "over trackage of Union Pacific, Western Pacific and Denver & Rio Grande railroads".

2nd train
The 2nd test train with Col. Carleton V. Hansen again as "train commander" had 31 SAC "airmen and officers and 11 civilian engineering, maintenance and logistic representatives" when it left the Hill AFB rail terminal (Col. Lucion N Powell was also on the train as commander of the SAC "task force at Hill Field".)

26 July train
The 3rd train had an additional flatcar with maintenance vanSpokane Daily Chronicle - Google News Archive Search holding a 3rd stage Hercules SRM, as well as the 1st 80 ft (24 m) "pre-prototype" launch car with special shock absorbers ("three-way stretch" system) Prescott Evening Courier - Google News Archive Search transporting a simulated missile load using tank & steel compartments (with sand & concrete) for a total of 13 cars that left Hill on 26 July. The 3rd train was planned for a 3000 mile, 14 day trip over 7 railroads (UP, SP, WP, GN, SP&S, Milwaukee, & NP)--the 1st train's route was 1,100 mi (1,800 km) and the 2nd was 2300 (10 days), both using 11 cars. The 3rd train was near Spokane on 6 August, Personnel included 35 SAC & BMD military and 13 civilians.

4th train
The commander of the August 1960 train was Lt. Col. James F. Lambert

By 16 November, "no operational date [had] been set for the missile trains" and on 13 December 1960, a "full-scale mockup of a Minuteman train [was] in a big hangar at the Boeing Airplane Co. plant" (in 1959, the "assembly and recycle plant" had been planned "on the western end of Hill Air Force Base [Ogden Air Material Area] in the section formerly known as Ogden Ordnance Depot" and next to the Thiokol plant. Minuteman trains were cancelled on 14 December 1960.

== Planned Minuteman trains ==
External image
- "dummy missile", boxcar with rocket motor, and "train control room"

The operational Minuteman trains were planned to have "five of the 10 cars [for] living and working quarters for the missilemen, including a control section where two launch officers [would] sit at duplicate panels…separated by bullet-proof glass." The Hill Air Material Area personnel were to rebuild existing Army-owned rail "cars to handle crews and equipment." The missile launch cars were to be specially built at Utah General Depot. On 27 January 1961, a train was in Chicago "testing switching facilities" with "launching cars weigh 127 tons, equipped with four extra wheels to bear the weight of the 30 ton Minuteman, and a set of 12 hydraulic jacks to secure the missile in firing position" (the 1st operational train was planned for June 1962.)

The planned deployment with "Minuteman trains cost[ing] more than silo sites" was for wide-ranging operations to require the enemy's use of "more than 10,000 missiles against railroad trackage to immobilize the minuteman train fleet" of 150 missiles using 100,000 mi (160,000 km) of the US's 218,000 mi (351,000 km) of tracks by 1963. American Machine and Foundry and American Car and Foundry were to develop the railroad carrying and launch cars. In December 1960, plans included the use of a "radio-launch…network of antennae buried a few feet underground adjacent to each control tower."

The plan for Minuteman trains "had been shelved temporarily" by 19 May 1961, and on 14 December 1961, the Pentagon ended the rail program due to cost.

The 1st Utah-made Minuteman was shipped to a silo field from Air Force-Boeing Plant No. 77 in July 1962 in a 63.5 ft (19.4 m) "transport-erector vehicle" on a "special-built 85-foot flatbed railroad car".

Twenty-five years later a Peacekeeper Rail Garrison plan was announced by the Reagan Administration in 1986.
