= 42nd Rocket Division =

- Active: 1960–present
- Country: Soviet Union (1960–1991); Russia (1991–present)
- Branch: Strategic Rocket Forces
- Part of: 31st Rocket Army

The 42nd Tagil Rocket Division (Military Unit Number 34103) is an intercontinental ballistic missile formation of the Russian Strategic Rocket Forces. It is based at Svobodny, Sverdlovsk Oblast/Nizhniy Tagil, Sverdlovsk Oblast, and it is part of the 31st Rocket Army.

== History ==
The history of the Tagil missile division and settlement started in 1960 with the construction of engineering structures, access roads, and housing for the rocket personnel. The first house was commissioned in December 1961. The 202nd Rocket Brigade was formed on December 1, 1960, on the basis of the 19th Training Tank Regiment and the 18th howitzer artillery brigade. First commander of the division was assigned to Major-General Oleg Maisky.

== Launch ==
In May 1961 the 202nd Rocket Brigade was redesignated the 42nd Rocket Division. On October 31, 1961, the first launch Divisions went on alert (commanders - Lieutenant and Grabski OA and Mishin VP), being armed with intercontinental ballistic missiles P-16U (8K64U).

== Honors and awards ==
Few honors and awards are given below.

- October 18, 1965 Order Presidium of the Supreme Soviet of the RSFSR locality military unit 34103 was given the name - "the industrial community free", it belongs to the category of industrial communities closed.
- October 20, 1967, for his services in defense of the country division was awarded a commemorative sign Central Committee of the Supreme Council and the Council of Ministers.
- December 14, 1972, to mark the 50th anniversary of the USSR Division was awarded the Jubilee Honorary Badge of the CPSU Central Committee, the Presidium of the Supreme Soviet and the Council of Ministers.
- December 12, 1999 Presidential Decree division was awarded the title Tagil. May 9, 2000, the division was awarded an Honorary Banner Administration of Nizhny Tagil.

Based on the Federal Law "On General Principles of Local Self-Government in the Russian Federation," the closed village municipality have the status of free city district.
