= Vladimir Utkin =

Soviet and Russian rocket engineer

- Владимир Уткин
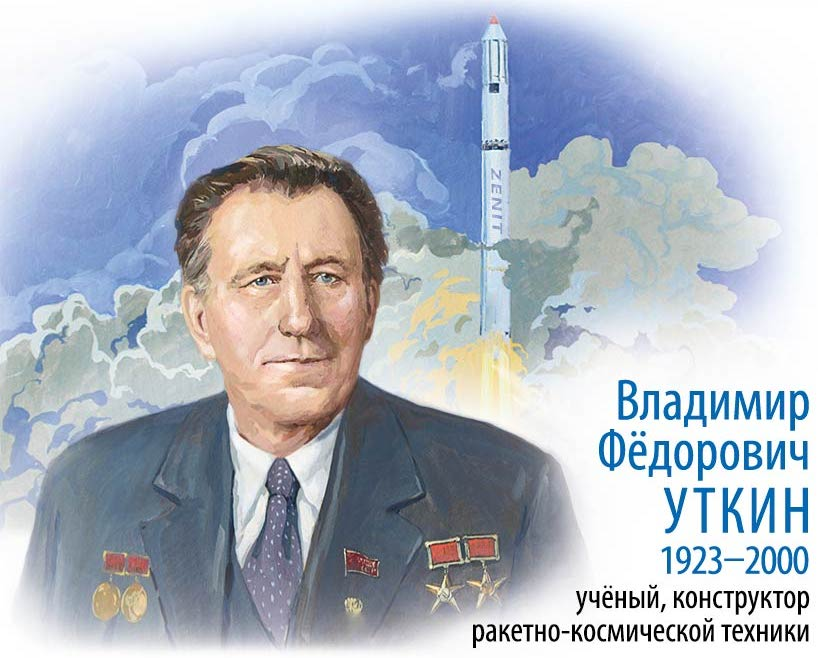
- Born: 17 October 1923; Ryazan Oblast, Russian Soviet Federative Socialist Republic, USSR
- Died: 15 February 2000 (aged 76); Moscow, Russia
- Citizenship: Soviet Union → Russia
- Education: Baltic State Technical University (1952)
- Occupations: scientist; engineer; rocket designer
- Years active: 1952–2000
- Known for: development of the railcar-launched ICBM RT-23 Molodets and other Soviet rockets
- Title: Doctor of Science; Academician
- Spouse: Valentina Pavlovna Utkina
- Awards: Twice Hero of Socialist Labour; Lenin Prize; USSR State Prize

Signature
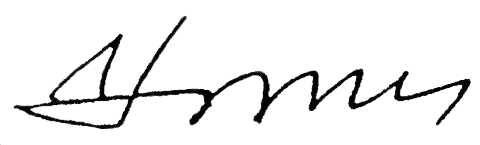

Vladimir Fyodorovich Utkin (Russian: Владимир Фёдорович Уткин; 17 October 1923 – 15 February 2000) was a Russian engineer and rocket scientist in the Soviet Union. He developed railcar-launched ICBM RT-23 Molodets and other Soviet rockets.

== Early life ==
Utkin was born in the village of Pustobor, Ryazan Oblast, Russia. After graduation, he was drafted into the army. He fought in the Great Patriotic War, earning medals. He graduated from the Jet Armament department of Leningrad military engineering institute in 1952. He earned his Doctorate of Engineering in 1967.

== Career ==
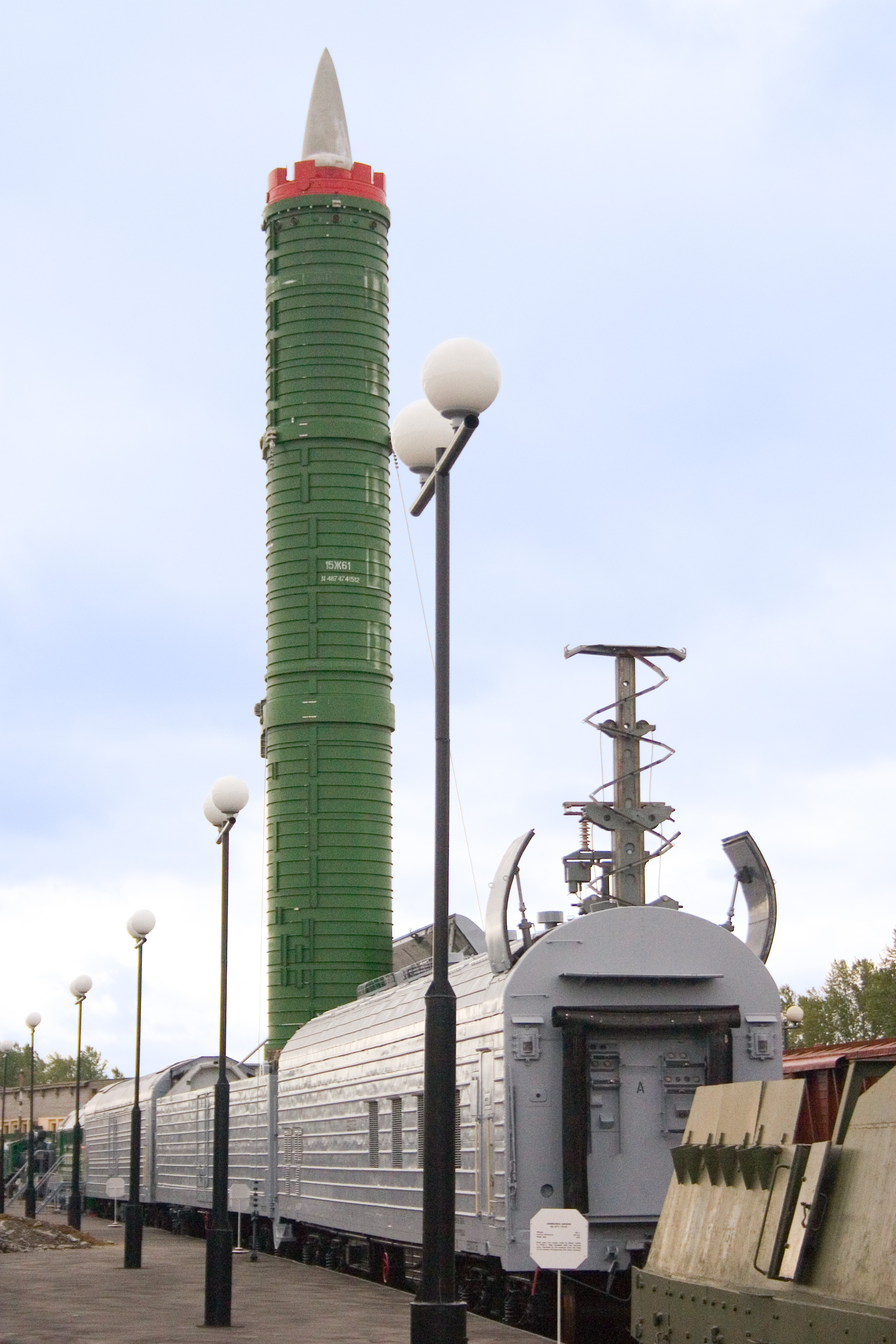
RT-23 Molodets in the Saint Petersburg railway museum.

Utkin was sent to Special Design Bureau #586 in Dnepropetrovsk, where he worked on the organization of series production of first Soviet ballistic missiles R-1, R-2, R-5 designed by Sergey Korolev.

After the foundation of Yuzhnoye design office, he worked as an engineer, senior engineer, group head, sector head, department head, Deputy and First Deputy Chief Designer. In 1971, he became Chief Designer, and then General Designer of Yuzhnoye design office. In 1990–2000, Vladimir Utkin worked as General Director of TsNIIMASh, Russia.

As Yuzhnoye's General Designer, Utkin helped materialize the concepts and projects conceived by his predecessor Mikhail Yangel.

Under Utkin's leadership, Yuzhnoye developed and put into service strategic missile systems that formed the basis of the Strategic Rocket Forces. Among these missiles were the SS-18, one of the most powerful and efficient liquid-propellant intercontinental ballistic missiles, called Satan by the Americans, and the solid-propellant SS-24 ICBM (Scalpel) in silo-based and rail-mobile versions. The Cyclone and Zenit space launch systems and military, scientific, and civil application spacecraft were among the systems developed and put into service.

Scientific and technical problems solved during development include leak-tightness of propellant system, leaving fueled missiles on stand for a long time, heavy missiles were launched from containers "mortar style", anti-ballistic missile systems were developed. Silos were superhardened, missiles were hardened against nuclear strike; a high degree of combat readiness and high missile firing accuracy were achieved.

Vladimir Utkin placed emphasis on environmental protection, automation of prelaunch operations, missile firing rates, and other topical issues. Solution of a number of scientific and technical problems led to the development of Zenit, the best medium-lift launch vehicle in the world, which subsequently became the basis of big international projects Sea Launch and Land Launch.

Vladimir Utkin was an active participant in international cooperation in space research and exploration, including the Interkosmos program: the Arcade project with the Aureole satellite was implemented jointly with French specialists; Aryabhata and Bhaskara satellites were built and launched into orbit in cooperation with India.

A lot of the credit must go to Vasiliy Utkin for using decommissioned missiles to launch spacecraft (under the Dnepr program, etc.).

Vladimir Utkin is the author and co-author of more than 200 scientific studies: projects, articles, inventions.

He took an active part in social life, management of the state affairs. He was repeatedly elected to the Supreme Soviet of the USSR (1972–1991); he was a member of the Central Committee of the Communist Party of the USSR (1976–1991).

Twice Hero of Socialist Labor (1969, 1976), winner of Lenin Prize (1964) and the USSR State Prize (1980). Utkin was decorated with the Medal for Labor Valor (1956), Order of the Red Banner of Labor (1959), Orders of Lenin (1961, 1966, 1969, 1973, 1976, 1983).

Vladimir Utkin Died on 15 February 2000 and was buried with military honours at the Troyekurovskoye cemetery, Moscow On 17 February 2000.

The Golden and the Silver medal were established in memory of Vladimir Utkin. Today, these medals have awarded to scientists and designers for outstanding achievements in aerospace technology development.

== Recognition ==
- Academician of Academy of Sciences of Ukraine (1976)
- Academician of Academy of Sciences of the USSR (1984)
- Academician of Russian Academy of Sciences (1992)
- Full Member of the International Academy of Astronautics
- President of K.E. Tsiolkovsky Russian Academy of Cosmonautics. Asteroid 13477 Utkin was named after him.
