= 52nd Rocket Division =

23rd Anti-Aircraft Artillery Division (15 January 1943 – 9 September 1955) 97th Anti-Aircraft Artillery Division (9 September 1955 – 1960) 52nd Rocket Division (30 May 1961 – 1 December 2002)
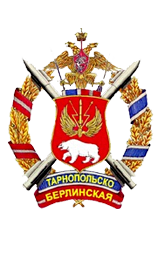
- Emblem of the 52nd Rocket Division
- Active: 1943–1960; 1961–2002
- Country: Soviet Union; Russia
- Branch: Red Army / Soviet Army; Strategic Rocket Forces (from 1961)
- Type: Division
- Role: Air defense (1943–1960); Intercontinental ballistic missile (1961–2001)
- Part of: 31st Rocket Army (1970–2002)
- Garrison/HQ: Zvyozdny (Bershet) (1961–2002)
- Anniversaries: 27 June (formation)
- Engagements: World War II
- Decorations: Order of Bogdan Khmelnitsky, 2nd class; Order of the Red Star
- Battle honours: Ternopol; Berlin

The 52nd Rocket Division (Russian: 52-я ракетная дивизия) was a division of the Soviet and Russian Strategic Rocket Forces, active from 1961 to 2002.

The division traced its lineage to the formation of the Red Army's 23rd Anti-Aircraft Artillery Division during World War II in January 1943. In the spring of that year it served on the Northwestern Front with the 27th Army, then was transferred to the Steppe Front with the army in May. The 23rd provided air defense for the army in the Belgorod–Kharkov Offensive, the Battle of the Dnieper, and the Battle of Kiev. In December it transferred to the 60th Army, with which it spent most of the rest of the war. The division fought in the Proskurov–Chernovitsy Offensive, the Lvov–Sandomierz Offensive, the Sandomierz–Silesian Offensive, and the Battle of Berlin. For helping to capture Ternopol and Berlin, the division received the cities' names as honorifics, and was awarded the Order of Bogdan Khmelnitsky and the Order of the Red Star for fighting in Silesia. At the end of the war in May 1945 the division fought in the capture of Dresden with the 3rd Guards Tank Army.

Postwar, the 23rd was stationed near Vienna, and after the Soviet withdrawal from Austria in 1955 was stationed in western Ukraine and renumbered as the 97th Anti-Aircraft Artillery Division before being disbanded in 1960. Two of its regiments were used to form the 206th Rocket Brigade of the new Strategic Rocket Forces at Bershet, Perm Oblast. In 1961, the 206th was expanded into the 52nd Rocket Division, which inherited the honors of the 97th Division. Until 2002, as part of the 31st Rocket Army, the division successively operated R-16, UR-100, and RT-23 intercontinental ballistic missiles. It was disbanded in 2002 and its lineage inherited by a base for storage and transshipment which was tasked with dismantling the division's missile facilities. The base was disbanded in 2007 after the completion of its task.

== World War II ==
The 23rd Anti-Aircraft Artillery Division of the Reserve of the Supreme High Command (RVGK) began forming on 15 January 1943 in Moscow at the Anti-Aircraft Artillery Training Center, part of the Moscow Military District. It was formed from personnel of the Sevastopol Anti-Aircraft Artillery School and VNOS (Air Warning, Observation, and Communications) troops, and was commanded by Colonel Nikolay Sitnikov. Writer Sergey Smirnov served with the division from its formation. The 23rd completed its formation on 21 February, and included the 1064th, 1336th, 1342nd, and the 1348th Anti-Aircraft Artillery Regiments. The 1354th Anti-Aircraft Artillery Regiment was part of the division on 1 February, but was replaced by the 1064th after being transferred to the 27th Anti-Aircraft Artillery Division by the time formation was completed. The 1064th was armed with heavier 85 mm guns, while the other three regiments had 37 mm guns.

Two days later the 23rd joined the Northwestern Front, and was transported by rail to Kresttsy station, arriving there on 26 February. The division was tasked with providing air defense for 27th Army's supply stations in the Staraya Russa area and the airfields of the 6th Air Army in the areas of Zhernovka, Vypolzovo, Kresttsy, and Guzatino. It was spread out along 110 kilometers of railway line and up to 120 kilometers in the rear area, creating considerable command and control problems. The 1064th and 1336th Regiments were closer to the front in the 27th Army's sector while the 1342nd and 1348th Regiments were directly subordinated to the Northwestern Front headquarters in this arrangement.

German aviation became more active from 1 March, and He 111 and Ju 88 bombers, as well as Bf 109 and Fw 190 fighters overflew locations defended by the 23rd multiple times a day at an altitude of five to six kilometers. The newly formed units of the division, which had previously conducted training, began combat operations. On 5 March the 2nd and 3rd Batteries of the 1064th Regiment repulsed multiple air attacks in the Parfino area. During April, the division repulsed seventeen German air raids, of which seven included several aircraft and ten of lone aircraft. Later that month the 23rd was transferred from the Northwestern Front to the RVGK and relocated to Voronezh Oblast. On 25 May it became part of the Steppe Front, providing air defense to the 27th Army, which had also relocated from the Northwestern Front.

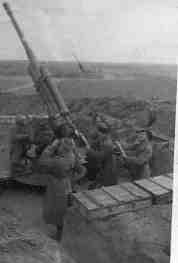
AA guns of the type used by the division in firing positions

In early August, with the 27th Army, the division advanced towards Grayvoron in the Belgorod-Kharkov Offensive. It engaged in fierce fighting in the crossing of the Vorskla River. Grayvoron was captured on 7 August; during the battles in the area the 23rd claimed twelve enemy aircraft and 60 of its men were decorated. For most of the rest of the month, the division fought stubbornly fought for the Vorskla crossings near Akhtyrka; the crossings changed hands multiple times. During these actions the men of the 23rd often had to use their guns in direct fire mode against German tanks and infantry. In the Akhtyrka fighting the division claimed 29 German aircraft and 72 of its men were decorated.

The 23rd then fought in the Battle of the Dnieper in the fall, responsible for providing air defense for the advance and supply lines of ground forces in the area of Zarubintsy and Grigoriyevka in the battles for the Bukrin bridgehead. After the capture of Kiev in early November, the 23rd was transferred from the 27th Army to the 60th Army in December; it would serve with the latter for most of the rest of the war. On 18 January 1944, Sitnikov was killed in fighting near Polonne; he was replaced by Colonel Yakov Lyubimov, who would command the division for the rest of the war. In early 1944, the division fought in heavy fighting for Shepetovka, claiming seven enemy aircraft before the town was captured on 11 February. For their actions in the Shepetovka fighting, 32 soldiers of the 1342nd Regiment were decorated. By 1 March the 1064th Regiment was detached from the main body of the division and directly subordinated to 1st Ukrainian Front command. During the Proskurov–Chernovitsy Offensive, the division helped capture Ternopol on 19 April, and was awarded the name of the city as an honorific for its actions. By 1 June the 1064th had rejoined the rest of the division with the 60th Army. The division was split again by 1 July when the 1342nd and 1348th Regiments were directly subordinated to the front headquarters, though it was reunited by 1 August.

In the summer, the 23rd fought with the 60th Army, tasked with the initial breakthrough in the Lvov–Sandomierz Offensive. The offensive began in mid-July, with the division covering the breakthrough of the 3rd Guards Tank Army and the 4th Guards Tank Army in the attack on Lvov, which was captured on 27 July. It claimed eighteen enemy aircraft downed and 4,745 German soldiers captured during the offensive, and for "exemplary fulfillment of command tasks" its 1064th Regiment was awarded the honorific Lvov. By the same decree, dated 10 August, the 1342nd and 1348th Regiments received the Order of the Red Banner.

In early January 1945, the division advanced out of the Sandomierz bridgehead, where it had ended the summer fighting, in the Sandomierz–Silesian Offensive. The 1st Ukrainian Front's attack was directed towards Kraków and southern Silesia. The former city was taken on 19 January, with the division claiming 32 enemy aircraft downed and capturing 2,280 soldiers in the offensive. For its actions, the 1064th Regiment received the Order of Kutuzov, 3rd class. After the capture of Kraków, the division continued advancing towards Ratibor, reaching the Oder on 2 February. Between 21 February and 14 March it helped defend the Dabrowskie Coal Basin region from German counterattack. For participating in the capture of the coal basin and of southern Upper Silesia, the 23rd was awarded the Order of Bogdan Khmelnitsky, 2nd class. In the subsequent attack on Ratibor, the division provided air defense for the crossing of the Oder by Soviet troops. Ratibor was captured on 30 March, and the division claimed 28 enemy aircraft downed in the fighting. For "exemplary performance of command tasks" in the attack on Ratibor the 23rd Division was awarded the Order of the Red Star.

From 16 April, the division fought in the Battle of Berlin. Between 21 and 30 April it provided air defense for the ground troops. The soldiers of the division also fought in urban warfare in the streets of Berlin, participating in the capture of eight city blocks. During the battle, the 23rd claimed sixteen aircraft downed and killed numerous German soldiers. For "courage and valor" in the capture of Berlin, the 23rd was awarded the name of the city as an honorific. Between 3 and 5 May, it moved to the Dresden area as part of the 3rd Guards Tank Army, where the surrounded German 9th Army was attempting to break out to the west. It helped capture Meissen on 6 May and Dresden on 7 May; the latter was its last combat of the war. For actions in the capture of Dresden, the 1336th Regiment received the honorific Dresden and the 1342nd Regiment the Order of Alexander Nevsky. During the war, the 23rd was credited with downing 352 enemy aircraft, killing 3,695 enemy soldiers, capturing 12,090, destroying ten artillery batteries and seventeen tanks. 2,966 soldiers of the division were decorated, with 26 receiving the Order of the Red Banner, one the Order of Kutuzov, 3rd class, one the Order of Bogdan Khmelnitsky, 2nd class, four the Order of Bogdan Khmelnitsky, 3rd class, two the Order of Alexander Nevsky, 65 the Order of the Patriotic War, 1st class, 116 the Order of the Patriotic War, 2nd class, 645 the Order of the Red Star, 169 the Order of Glory, 3rd class, 1,022 the Medal "For Courage", and 915 the Medal "For Battle Merit".

== Postwar ==
After the capture of Dresden, the division was relocated to Korneuburg and Stockerau near Vienna. Until 1955, the division served there as part of Soviet occupation forces in Austria in the Central Group of Forces. In May 1955, the Soviet troops were ordered to withdraw from Austria, and in September the 23rd was relocated to Shepetovka in the Carpathian Military District. On 1 September it was renumbered as the 97th Anti-Aircraft Artillery Division in accordance with a directive dated 28 August. In 1958, it was rearmed with new Surface-to-air missiles. Around that time the division began disbanding, a process completed by 1960.

=== Strategic Rocket Forces ===
With the introduction of intercontinental ballistic missiles into service beginning in 1959, the Strategic Rocket Forces (SRF) were formed to operate the missile launch facilities. In accordance with a directive of May 1960, the 206th Rocket Brigade was formed at Bershet, Perm Oblast, from the 1170th and 1208th Anti-Aircraft Artillery Regiments of the 97th Division, the 35th Air Force School, and the 15th Tank Training Regiment. On 10 August, the first brigade commander, Colonel Georgy Stoppe, was assigned; he assumed command on 27 August. The formation of the 206th was completed by 19 November. The retraining of its personnel on missiles began in October, starting with training launches of the older R-2 missile.

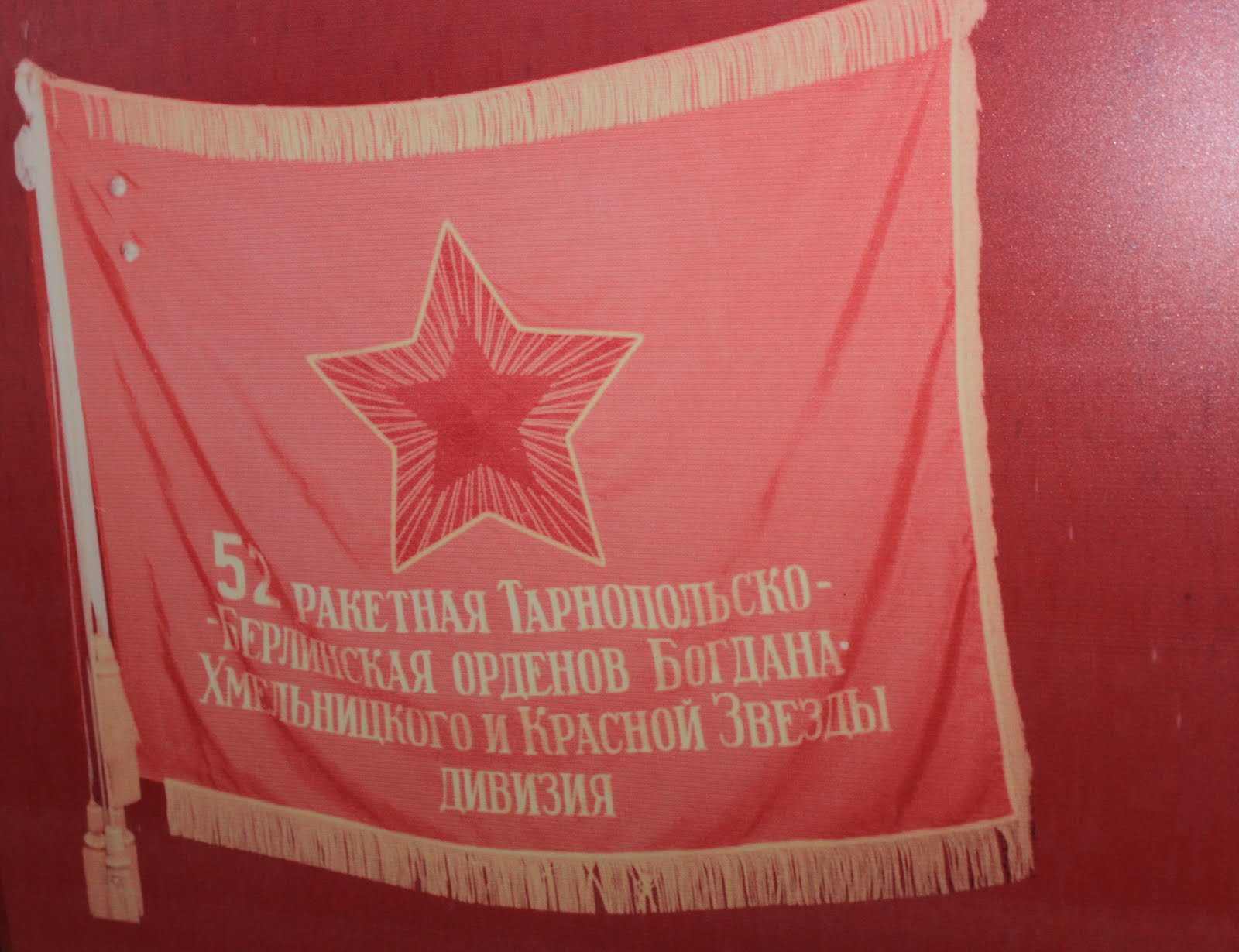
Battle flag of the 52nd Rocket Division, displayed in the division museum

It was initially placed under command of the 24th Artillery Range Administration, but from 10 May 1961 it joined the 5th Independent Rocket Corps. On 30 May the 52nd Rocket Division began forming from the 206th, with its headquarters 4 kilometers (2.5 mi) from Bershet in a camp that became known as Perm-76. The formation of the division was completed on 27 June, which became its annual holiday. It included the 721st, 723rd, 730th, and 734th Rocket Regiments, along with support units. On 22 July, the first division commander, Colonel Zinovy Ivanov, took command. Around this time the construction of the division's combat launch positions and other facilities began, delayed by wooded and swampy terrain until a concrete-surfaced road was completed. The first combat launch position was completed in December. In 1962 it began training with the new R-16 ballistic missile. The first rocket battalion went on alert duty on 13 March of that year, and by 1965 all of its rocket battalions were on alert duty. On 27 July 1962 the 52nd received the battle flag of the 23rd Anti-Aircraft Artillery Division; it had previously inherited the honors of the 97th Division.

Beginning in May 1964, the battalions were expanded into separate rocket regiments. Around the same time, the division began receiving updated UR-100 missiles, and on 24 November 1966 the first UR-100-armed regiment went on alert duty. On 8 June 1970, the 52nd became part of the 31st Rocket Army when the corps was expanded. By late 1970, the last of seven more UR-100 regiments had been placed on alert duty. These regiments were the 176th, 263rd, 598th, 608th, 684th, 721st, 723rd, and 730th Rocket Regiments. By the same time, the division had conducted a total of 20 R-16 training launches. The 52nd also added division and regimental command posts with automated command and control equipment in 1967, and in 1971 received satellite communications systems. Its separate rocket regiments became unified rocket regiments in 1967, and were completely rearmed with UR-100K missiles by 1975. Between 1976 and 1978, the R-16 silos were dismantled, with some of the equipment being sent to other divisions.

In 1988, the 52nd began reequipping with the RT-23 Molodets rail-mobile ballistic missile, launched from railway strategic missile trains. The first RT-23 regiment, the 161st Rocket Regiment, went on alert duty on 22 April 1989; by 1991, three more RT-23 regiments (the 174th, 223rd, and the 721st Rocket Regiments) were on alert duty. Simultaneously the UR-100Ks were withdrawn from the division and their regiments disbanded, a process completed by 1994. On 26 November 1966, the 161st Regiment conducted a successful RT-23 training launch at the Plesetsk Cosmodrome; this was the division's only RT-23 training launch in its career.

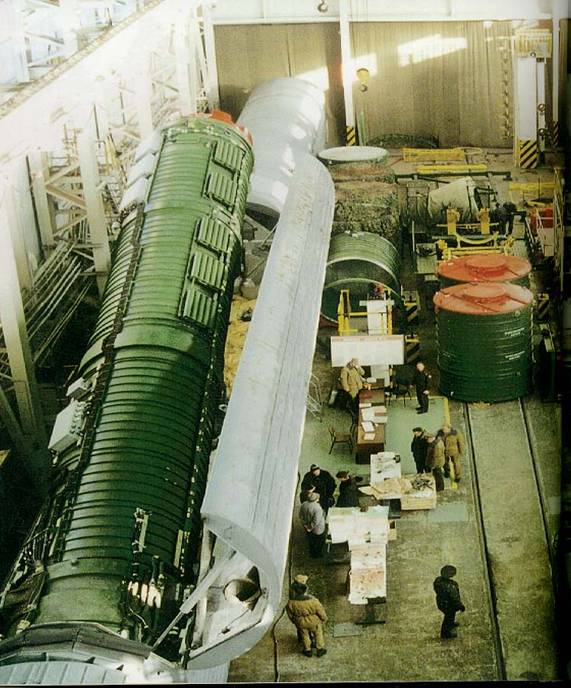
Removing an SS-24 from a railcar at Bershet, 2003

In 1994 the Perm-76 camp received the municipal designation Zvyozdny, Perm Krai.

The disbandment of units started in February 2002 as part of reforms of the Strategic Rocket Forces. One of the 52nd's four regiments was taken off alert duty and the first section of its ballistic missile trains were sent to be scrapped. The division's last commander, Major General Boris Sinenko, expressed his colleagues' misgivings at the time, wondering whether the "decision was timely." On 1 December, the division's honors were transferred to the 1328th Base for Storage and Transshipment of BZhRK Components, under the command of Sinenko, who led it for the duration of its existence. The base supervised the removal of the division's equipment until it was disbanded on 1 September 2007. During the five years of its existence, it shipped 37 missiles to Strategic Rocket Forces storage bases and arsenals, and drained rocket fuel from 40 missiles.

==== Commanders ====
The following officers commanded the division during its existence:

- Colonel (promoted to Major General) Zinovy Ivanov (22 July 1961 – 1 April 1966)
- Colonel Pavel Parshin (1 April 1966 – 7 May 1969)
- Major General Pavel Kabanov (7 May 1969 – 26 February 1973)
- Major General Anatoly Drukayev (26 February 1973 – 20 September 1976)
- Major General Valery Kozlov (20 September 1976 – 20 December 1980)
- Major General Veniamin Belousov (20 December 1980 – 21 June 1984)
- Major General Ivan Balabolkin (21 June 1984 – 29 June 1989)
- Major General Yury Kirillov (29 June 1989 – 4 November 1993)
- Major General Alexey Subbotin (4 November 1993 – 16 June 1999)
- Major General Boris Sinenko (16 June 1999 – 30 November 2002)
