= Railcar-launched ICBM =

Railroad based ICBM launcher

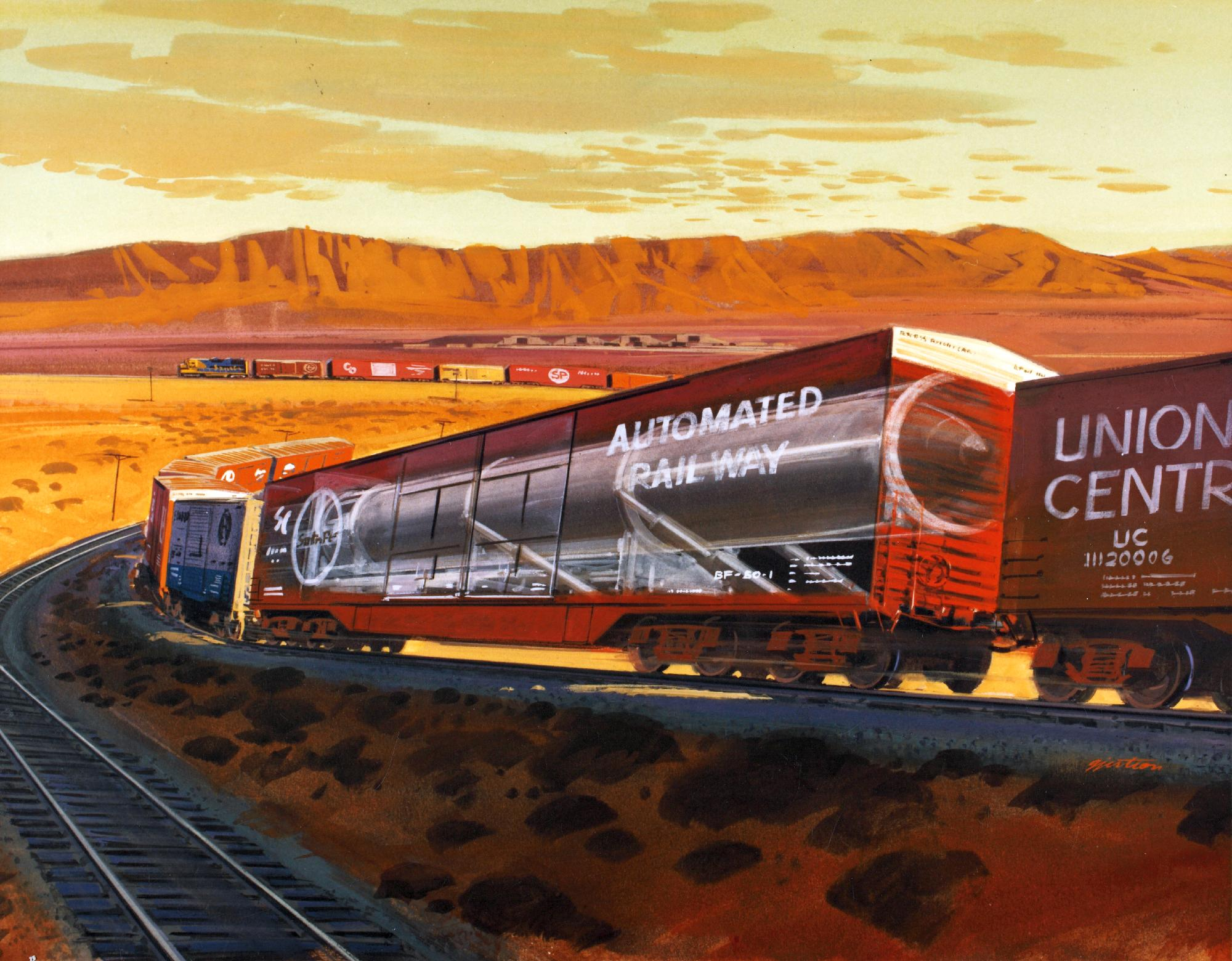
An artist's concept drawing of the Peacekeeper Rail Garrison

A railcar-launched ICBM is an intercontinental ballistic missile that can be launched from a train. The first operational example, and the best-known, is the Soviet RT-23 Molodets. The United States planned and started development of an analogue, the Peacekeeper Rail Garrison, but abandoned the plan with the end of the Cold War. A similar system was tested by China in 2016. North Korea also planned to create a railway-launched ICBM.

== Background ==
ICBMs are large, and not easily mobile. For this reason, they are traditionally launched from fixed missile silos. However, keeping missiles in fixed positions leaves them vulnerable to a pre-emptive nuclear strike. For strategic deterrence, nuclear-armed nations seek to ensure mutually assured destruction, meaning that if one nation launches a nuclear first strike, the target nation would still be able to launch a retaliatory nuclear strike.

=== Advantages ===
Rail-mobile ICBM systems are harder to destroy than fixed positions, as they can travel anywhere along a nation's rail network, and hide from satellite surveillance in tunnels. During times of heightened international tensions, railroad based ICBMs can be rapidly mobilized and spread out across a country's railroad network as an insurance policy.

=== Disadvantages ===
Railroad-based ICBMs also have several drawbacks. While basing them on railroad tracks makes them flexible, they are still limited to where railroad tracks exist. Railroad tracks are also vulnerable to sabotage, which would be a major concern during times of war. It is also difficult to maintain security along vast railroad networks, even during peacetime.

== Examples ==
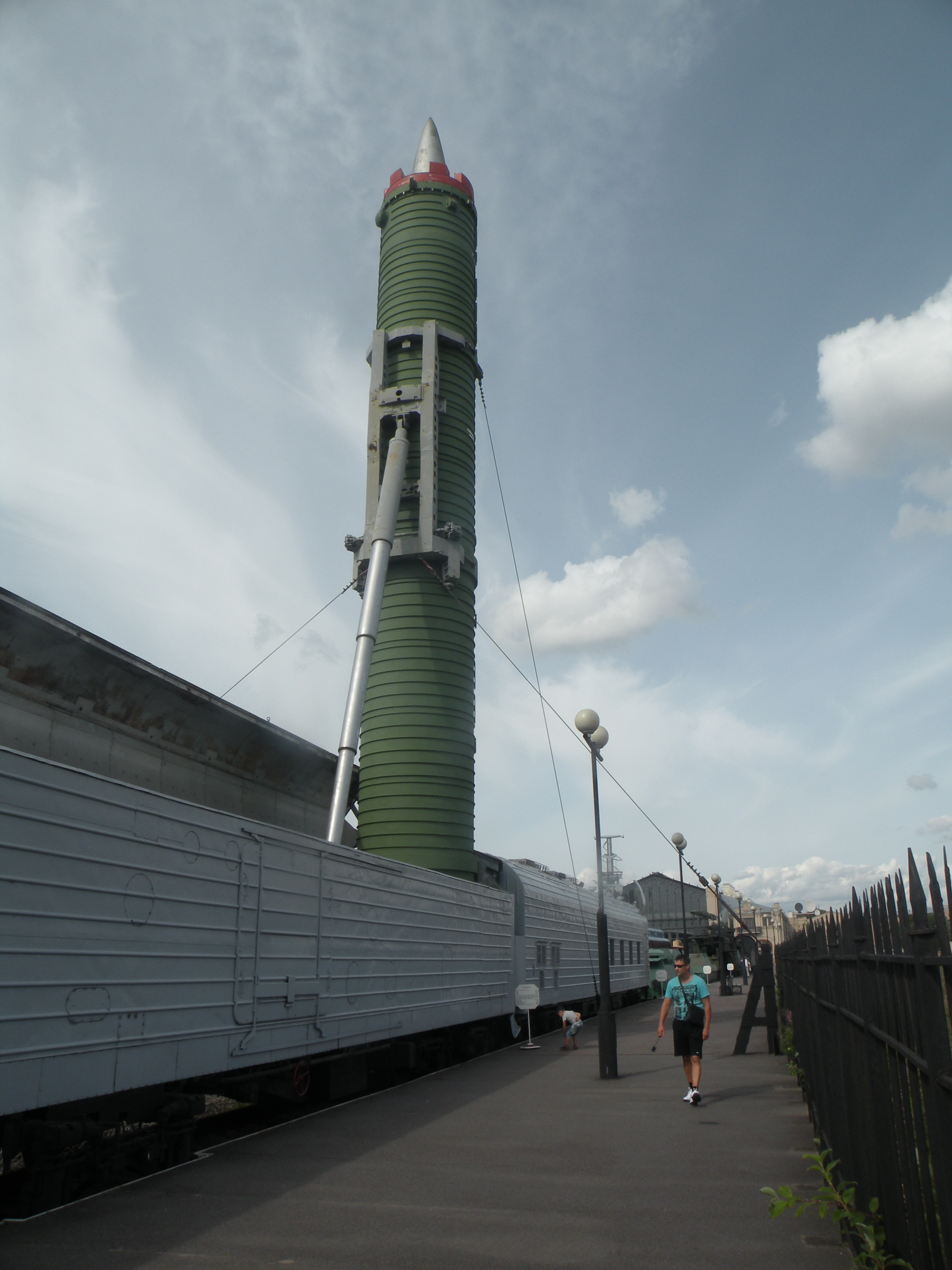
A preserved RT-23 Molodets train in Russia

=== RT-23 Molodets ===
The USSR was the first nation to deploy an ICBM system that was mobile by rail. Named the RT-23 Molodets, the system was deployed on specially designed trains in the 1980s on the Soviet rail network.

=== Peacekeeper Rail Garrison ===
In the 1980s, military planners in the United States conceived the Peacekeeper Rail Garrison as a means of pairing LGM-118 Peacekeeper missiles with the mobility of a train. The missiles would be disguised as normal boxcars and carried on dedicated trains operated by the United States Air Force, with an initial inventory of 25 trains, each carrying two Peacekeepers.

In a 1988 article in Air Force Magazine, a defense analyst described the benefits of a rail based ICBM system:

"Peacekeeper ICBMs mounted on railway cars can also disperse beyond the limits of the Soviet ICBM threat if given any kind of warning time. Within three hours after dispersal has begun, the attack price to the USSR for destroying the Peacekeeper rail-mobile force would exceed the entire projected SS-18 warhead inventory. Trying to target US mobile ICBM forces as they dispersed—along with other triad elements and fixed US targets—would be a targeting nightmare for Soviet warplanners."

The Cold War came to an end while the system was still in development, and as a result the program was cancelled to reduce costs, with one prototype Peacekeeper Rail Garrison car preserved at the National Museum of the United States Air Force.

=== Chinese system ===
China performed a cold launch test of a railroad based ICBM system in December 2016, which is equipped with the country's DF-41 missile and operated by the People's Liberation Army Rocket Force.

=== North Korean system ===
In September 2021, North Korea tested a new rail-based short-range ballistic missile (SRBM) system, and released photos of it firing a missile. A North Korean official said that the railway-borne missile system "serves as an efficient counter-strike means capable of dealing a harsh multi-concurrent blow to the threat-posing forces." The test of the railway-launched SRBM could create the basis of a future railway-launched ICBM.

=== Indian system ===
India has carried out the successful launch of the Intermediate Range Agni-Prime missile from a rail-based mobile launcher system. This next-generation missile is designed to cover a range of up to 2000 kilometres and is equipped with various advanced features. The first-of-its-kind launch carried out from a specially designed rail-based Mobile Launcher, which can move on the Rail network without any preconditions that allowing the user to have cross-country mobility and launch within a short reaction time with reduced visibility.
