= St. Louis Refrigerator Car Company =

St. Louis Refrigerator Car Co. #4466, a bunkerless refrigerator car, AAR mechanical designation RB, passes through Limon, Colorado on November 9, 1951.

The St. Louis Refrigerator Car Company (SLRX) was a private refrigerator car line established on February 3, 1878, by Anheuser-Busch, the brewer's first subsidiary. SLRX was formed to facilitate large-scale distribution of the A-B's products via the U.S. rail network. The SLRX not only built its own bunkerless reefers, but maintained and operated them as well.

In 1919 the firm was acquired by Manufacturers Railway Company (MRS), another A-B transportation subsidiary that provided switching service to the brewery and interchange connection with the common carrier railroads serving St. Louis. The St. Louis Refrigerator Car Company currently owns the "Dome Railway Service" in Wood River, Illinois.

St. Louis Refrigerator Car Company Roster, 1900–1970:

1900	1910	1920	1930	1940	1950	1960	1970
1,500	1,500	5,088	604	762	1,337	944	268
