= Bershet =

Bershet Бершеть
- Selo
- Location within Perm Krai Location within Russia
- Coordinates: 57°44′N 56°22′E
- Country: Russia
- Region: Perm Krai
- District: Permsky District

Population (2021)
  - Total: 3,199
- Time zone: UTC+5:00
- Postal code: 614551
- Area code: 3422

Bershet (Russian: Бершеть) is a rural locality (a selo) and the administrative center of Bershetskoye Rural Settlement, Permsky District, Perm Krai, Russia. The population was 3,199 as of 2021. The town has 70 streets.

== History ==
The settlement arose from the merger of three localities: the villages of Staraya Bershet, Novaya Bershet, and Srednaya Bershet. It was founded in the 1820s by former craftsmen, natives of Anninsky and Yugovskie copper smelteries.

== Geography ==
Bershet is located on the left bank of the Yug River^{[ru]} (a tributary of the Babka), and its left tributary, Bershet (Kama basin). It is located 34 km south of Perm (the district's administrative centre) by road. Zvyozdny is the nearest rural locality.

== Demographics ==
For much of the village's early history, the population remained minimal, under 500, In 1869, it had 213 people. 57 years later, the population had grown to 348 people.

In 2002, the population was 3,578. The population fell to 3,308 by 2010. During the 2021 All-Russia Census, the population fell again. The population is currently 3,199.
