= Zvyozdny, Perm Krai =

Closed urban-type settlement in Perm Krai, Russia

Zvyozdny Звёздный
- Urban-type settlement
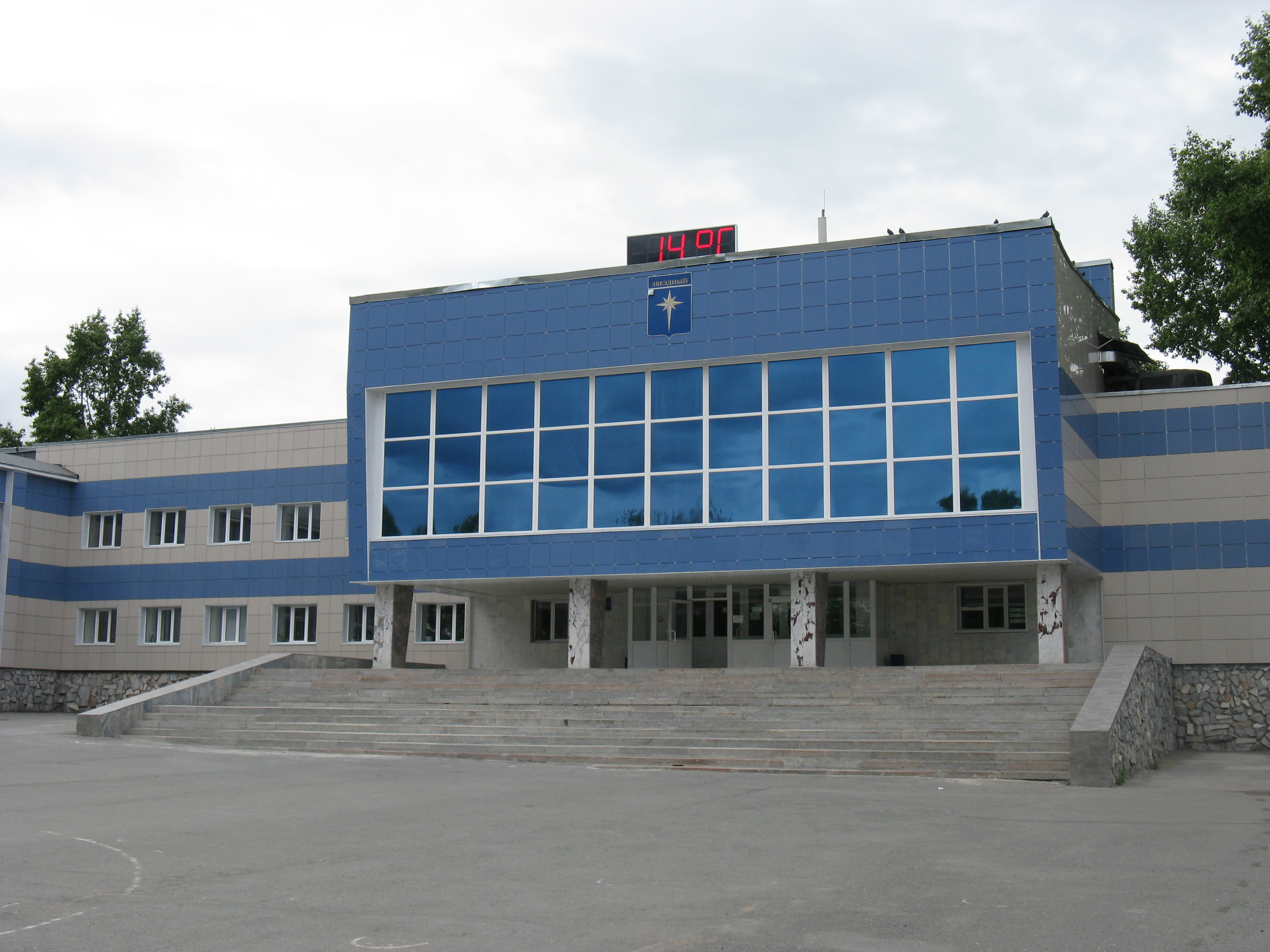
- Palace of Culture in Zvyozdny

- Flag Coat of arms
- Interactive map of Zvyozdny
- Location of Zvyozdny Zvyozdny (Perm Krai)
- Coordinates: 57°44′04″N 56°18′45″E
- Country: Russia
- Federal subject: Perm Krai
- Founded: 1961

Population (2010 Census)
  - Total: 9,151
  - Estimate (1 January 2024): 7,512 (−17.9%)

Administrative status
  - Subordinated to: closed administrative-territorial formation of Zvyozdny
  - Capital of: closed administrative-territorial formation of Zvyozdny

Municipal status
  - Urban okrug: Zvyozdny Urban Okrug
  - Capital of: Zvyozdny Urban Okrug
- Time zone: UTC+5 (MSK+2)
- Postal code: 614575
- OKTMO ID: 57763000051
- Website: zatozvezdny.ru

Zvyozdny (Russian: Звёздный), formerly Perm-76 (Пермь-76), is a closed urban locality (an urban-type settlement) in Perm Krai, Russia. Population: 9,151 (2010 census); 9,628 (2002 census).

== History ==
A permanent military summer camp was established in place of modern Zvyozdny in 1931. Originally, the camp was used for military training of infantry, artillery, and cavalry. It was supplied with guns from nearby Perm and with horses from the stud farms in the vicinity. In 1941, when Nazi Germany attacked the USSR, the camp was converted into a permanent installation which continued to be used after the war ended.

On June 27, 1961, the 52nd Tarnopol-Berlin of the orders of Bogdan Khmelnitsky II degree and the Red Star Rocket Division was formed (military unit No. 54090) with deployment in the Perm and Kungur regions of the Perm region on the basis of the 23rd anti-aircraft artillery Tarnopol-Berlin order of Bogdan Khmelnitsky II degree and the Red Star division, which began its combat journey during the Second World War of 1941-1945 [20].

In the shortest possible time, a position area for the ICBM division was built here . The first combat starting position was surrendered in December 1961. The first division with R-16 missiles took up combat duty in March 1962. The closed military townlet received the classified name Perm-76. From 1985 to 1990, the 52nd Rocket Division was being re-equipped with combat railway missile systems (BZHRK), and in 2002 the 52nd Rocket Division was disbanded, and on its basis the 1328th Base for the storage and reloading of BZHRK elements was created, which lasted until September 2007 [20].

In total, the division had 80 RS-10 ICBMs and 12 RS-22M ICBMs. For 40 years, several dozen training launches of strategic missiles have been made, all of them hit the targets.

== Administrative and municipal status ==
Within the framework of administrative divisions, it is incorporated as the closed administrative-territorial formation of Zvyozdny—an administrative unit with the status equal to that of the districts. As a municipal division, the closed administrative-territorial formation of Zvyozdny is incorporated as Zvyozdny Urban Okrug.

== See also ==
- List of closed cities
