= RT-23 Molodets =

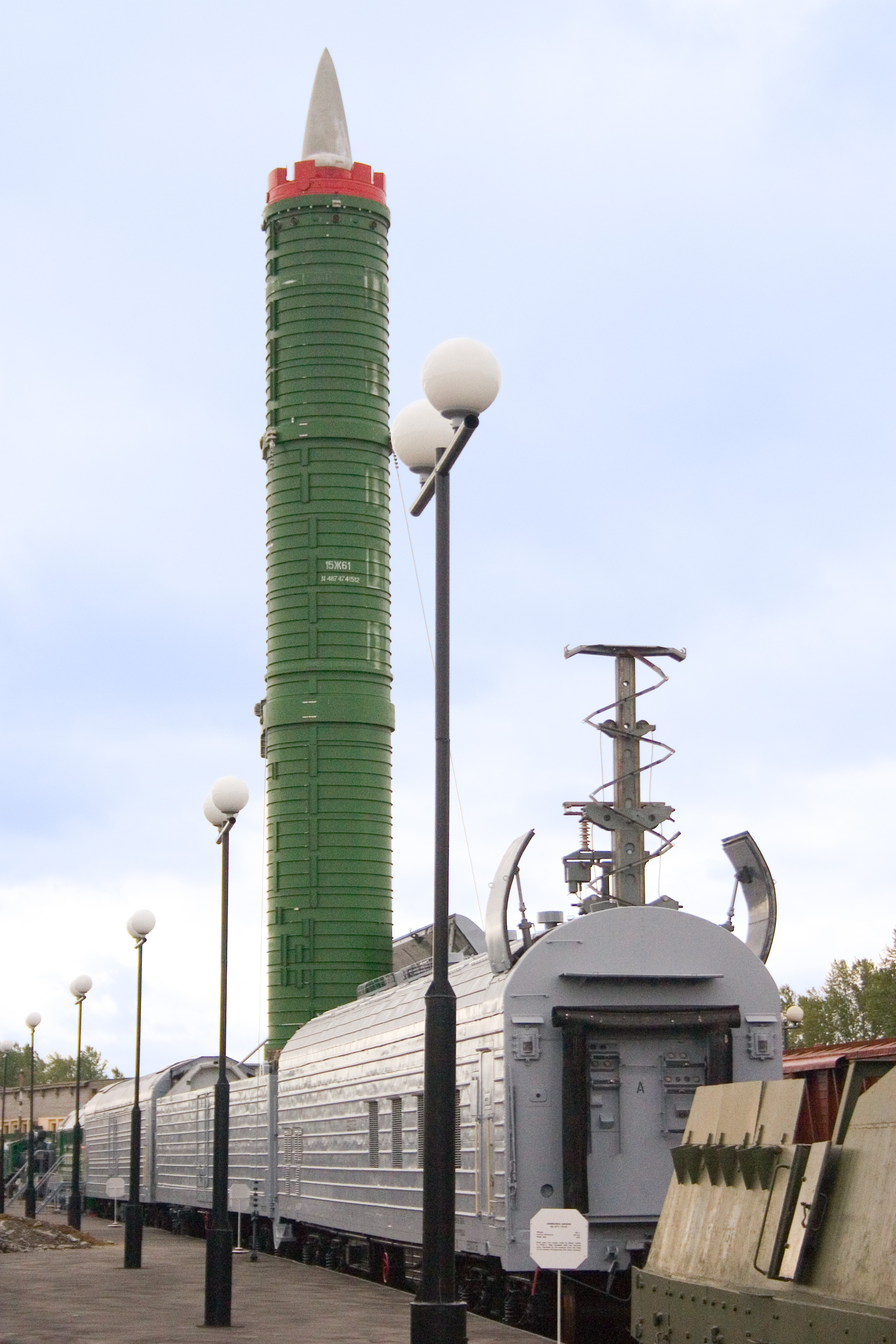
- BZhRK three-car autonomous launching module
- Type: ICBM
- Place of origin: USSR

Service history
- In service: 1987–2005
- Used by: Strategic Rocket Forces

Production history
- Manufacturer: Yuzhnoye Design Bureau

Specifications
- Mass: 104,500 kg (230,400 lb)
- Length: 23,400 mm (920 in)
- Diameter: 2,410 mm (95 in)
- Warhead: 10 × 550 kt MIRVs
- Engine: First stage: 15D305, Second stage: 15D339; 15D305: 3,040 kN, 15D339: 1,470 kN
- Propellant: Solid fuel
- Operational range: 10,000–11,000 km (6,200–6,800 mi)
- Guidance system: Inertial, autonomous
- Accuracy: 150–500 m
- Launch platform: Railcar TEL or silo

The RT-23 Molodets (Russian: РТ-23 УТТХ «Мо́лодец», lit. "brave man" or "fine fellow"; NATO reporting name: SS-24 Scalpel) was a cold-launched, three-stage, solid-fueled intercontinental ballistic missile developed and produced before 1991 by the Yuzhnoye Design Bureau in Dnipro, Ukraine (ex-Soviet Union). It came in silo- and rail-based variants, and was armed with 10 MIRV warheads (GRAU index: 15Ф444) of 550 kt yield. All missiles were decommissioned by 2005 in accordance with the START II.

== History ==
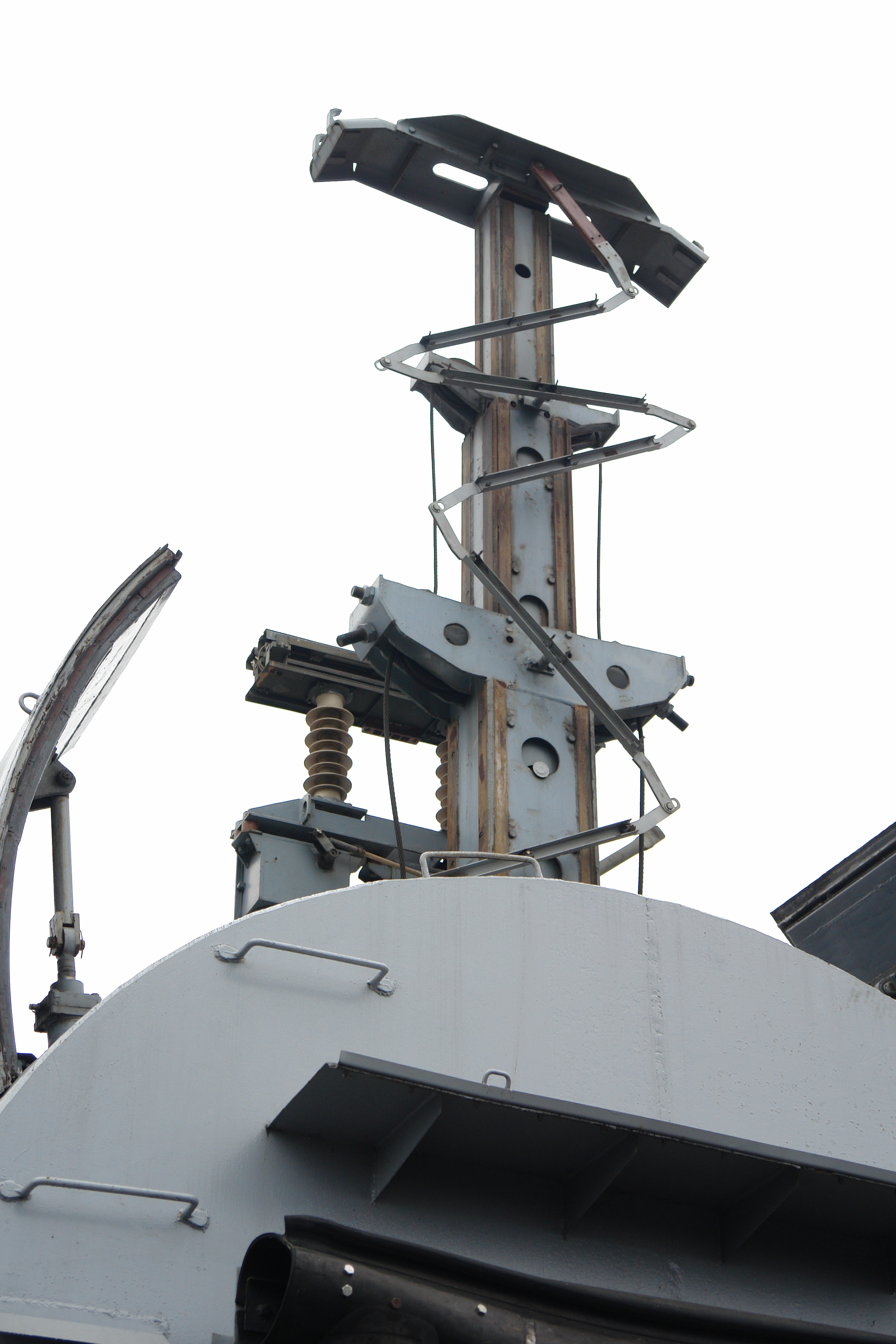
The overhead line short-circuiting and diverting mechanism

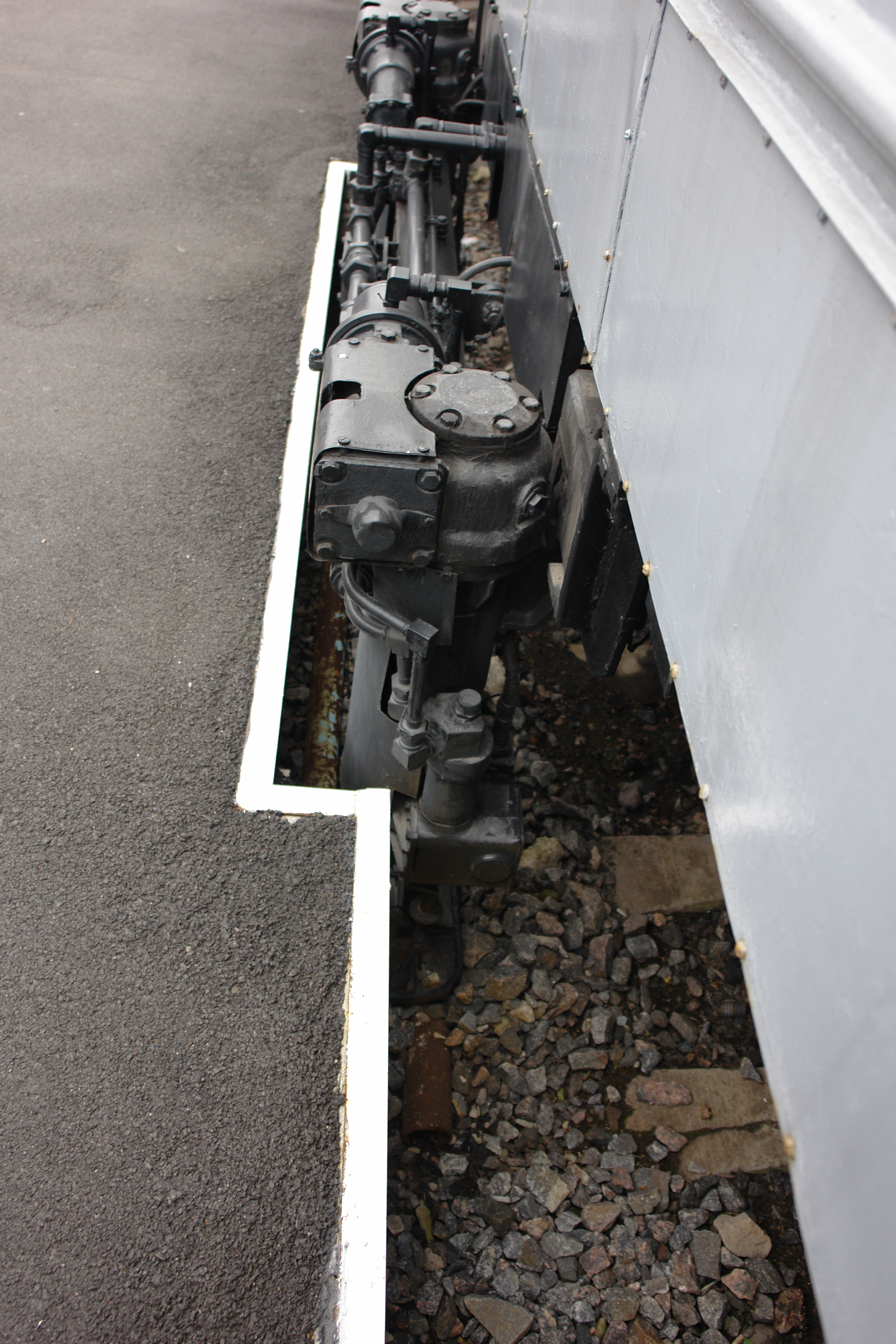
Railcar outriggers, deployed before launch

The missile and rail-based missile complex – or BZhRK (Russian: БЖРК, Боевой Железнодорожный Ракетный Комплекс, lit. "Combat Rail-based Missile Complex") – were developed by the brothers Vladimir and Alexei Utkin as chief engineers in Yuzhnoye Design Bureau and Design Bureau for Special Machine-Building respectively. It was the culmination of a major Soviet effort to develop a solid-propellant ICBM with multiple basing modes which was initiated in 1969. As addition to the silo- and rail-based versions, a road-mobile version was considered but eventually rejected. The new missile was to replace the older liquid-fueled UR-100N which were entirely silo-based. Its United States counterpart was the Peacekeeper Rail Garrison, which was never deployed.

The missile was tested through the 1980s and was deployed in 1987. A typical BZhRK consisted of three modified M62-class locomotives (designated DM62; were not different in appearance) and seventeen railcars: a camouflaged tank with diesel fuel and lubricants reserve, three 3-car autonomous launching modules (a launch support systems car, a car with an erectable RT-23 launcher and a launcher command post car), a regiment command post car, a communications systems car, a main diesel generator car, a provision storage car with refrigerators and water tanks, a dining car, and two separate living compartment cars for officers and enlisted personnel. All the railcars were camouflaged as either refrigerated vans or passenger cars. The lead locomotive was driven by three Railway Troops officers with good knowledge of a patrolling route, while the two others were operated by enlisted personnel. The train was able to cruise at speed of 80–120 km/h (50–75 mph) and launch the missiles at any point of the route on any Soviet rail line, which was made possible by implementation of the special mechanism for short-circuiting and diverting the overhead line (Russian: ЗОКС). Shortly after ejection by the powder pressure accumulator, at a height of 20–30 m, the missile would incline itself, so that the first-stage exhaust would not damage or overturn the railcar launcher, and then ignite the first-stage engine. The rail-based missile incorporated an inflatable nose cone as a means of length reduction for accommodation in a refrigerator car, while the silo-based variant was equipped with a more robust folding nose cone, since it was expected to be operated in a much harsher preemptive nuclear strike environment. In order to prevent damage to the railroad tracks caused by high weight of the launching car with a missile (>200 tons), the special three-car coupling system was developed for the launching modules, allowing for even weight distribution between neighboring cars. The missile train was able to function autonomously for up to 28 days.

In order to evaluate effects of a nearby nuclear explosion on the missile complex, on 27 February 1991, in Plesetsk, the "Sdvig" (Russian: Сдвиг, lit. "Shift") experiment was conducted, upon which a pile of 100,000 TM-57 anti-tank mines was detonated with the yield of 1,000 tons of TNT at a distance of 850 and 450 meters from the two separate groups of railcar launching and command modules. The experiment showed that, despite moderate damage to the railcars, the complexes were still able to conduct simulated missile launches (the computer system of one of them required a reboot). The level of acoustic pressure in the command modules, however, "exceeded 150 dB" and "would have resulted in a 20-minutes hearing loss" for the personnel. Prior to that, in 1988, at Semipalatinsk Test Site, the rail-based complex took part in the "Siyanie" (Russian: Сияние, lit. "Shining") and "Groza" (Russian: Гроза, lit. "Thunderstorm") experiments, meant to evaluate its EMP and lightning protection effectiveness.

According to US Defense Department, as of September 1991, production of the RT-23 had ended with approximately 90 missiles deployed. Its production facilities were located in Ukraine, and after the dissolution of the Soviet Union in 1991, the production of the missile was halted. The 46 silo-based missiles located in Ukraine were deactivated by mid-1996 and put into storage awaiting a decision on a feasible disposal method, while their warheads were sent to Russia for dismantlement. In 1998–2001, all Ukrainian RT-23 missiles were dismantled and 45 out of 46 RT-23 silos exploded, with one of them left intact for exhibition purposes. A total of 46 missiles remained in service by April 1997 with the Strategic Missile Forces (10 silo- and 36 rail-based). The remaining 10 silo-based missiles in Russia were deactivated and sent for dismantlement in 2001, and their silos were modified for Topol-M complexes. After 2000, the rail-based missiles were also gradually withdrawn from service, with the remaining 15 decommissioned in August 2005. In that same year, Nikolay Solovtsov, then commander of the Strategic Missile Forces, officially announced retirement of the RT-23 rail-based complex. The last RT-23 ICBM in Russia was eliminated in April 2008.

Its successor, BZhRK Barguzin, was reportedly under development for the Strategic Missile Forces (RVSN), but in 2017 it was announced the project had been frozen due to insufficient funding.

== Versions ==
RT-23 versions comparison
	Service	RT-23		RT-23 UTTKh
GRAU	15Zh44	15Zh52	15Zh60	15Zh61
DIA	SS-24 PL-04 (R&D index)	SS-24 Mod 0	SS-24 Mod 2	SS-24 Mod 1
Bilateral		RS-22B	RS-22A	RS-22V
Design bureau	SKB-586, NPO Yuzhynoy Acad. V. F. Utkin			
Approved	23 July 1976	1 June 1979	9 August 1983	9 August 1983
Years of R&D	January 1969 – March 1977	November 1982 – 1987	1983–1989	1983–1989
First flight test	26 October 1982, failure; December 1982, success	April 1984	31 July 1986	27 February 1985
IOC	Canceled	19 August 1988	December 1988	December 1987
Deployment date	Canceled	November 1987	28 November 1989	28 November 1989
Type of warhead	MIRV			
Warheads	10			
Payload (t)	4.05			
Total length (mm)	23,300	23,400–23,800	18,800–23,400	23,300
Total length excl. warhead (mm)	18,800; 19,000	19,000	19,000	19,000
Missile diameter (mm)	2,400			
Launch mass (t)	104.5			
Operating range (km)	10,000	10,000–11,000	10,100-11,000	10,100–10,450
CEP (m)	500		150–250	
Basing mode		Silo	Silo	Railroad

== Former operators ==
Soviet Union and Russia
The Strategic Missile Troops were the only operators of the RT-23 until the breakup of the Soviet Union.
Silo-based with 46th Rocket Division in Pervomaisk and 60th Rocket Division in Tatischevo.
Rail-based with 10th Rocket Division in Kostroma region, 52nd Rocket Division in Zvyozdny, Perm region, and 36th Rocket Division in Kedrovy, Krasnoyarsk region.
Ukraine
The Armed Forces of Ukraine inherited 46 silo-based RT-23 missiles stationed in Pervomaisk upon independence from the Soviet Union.

== Gallery ==
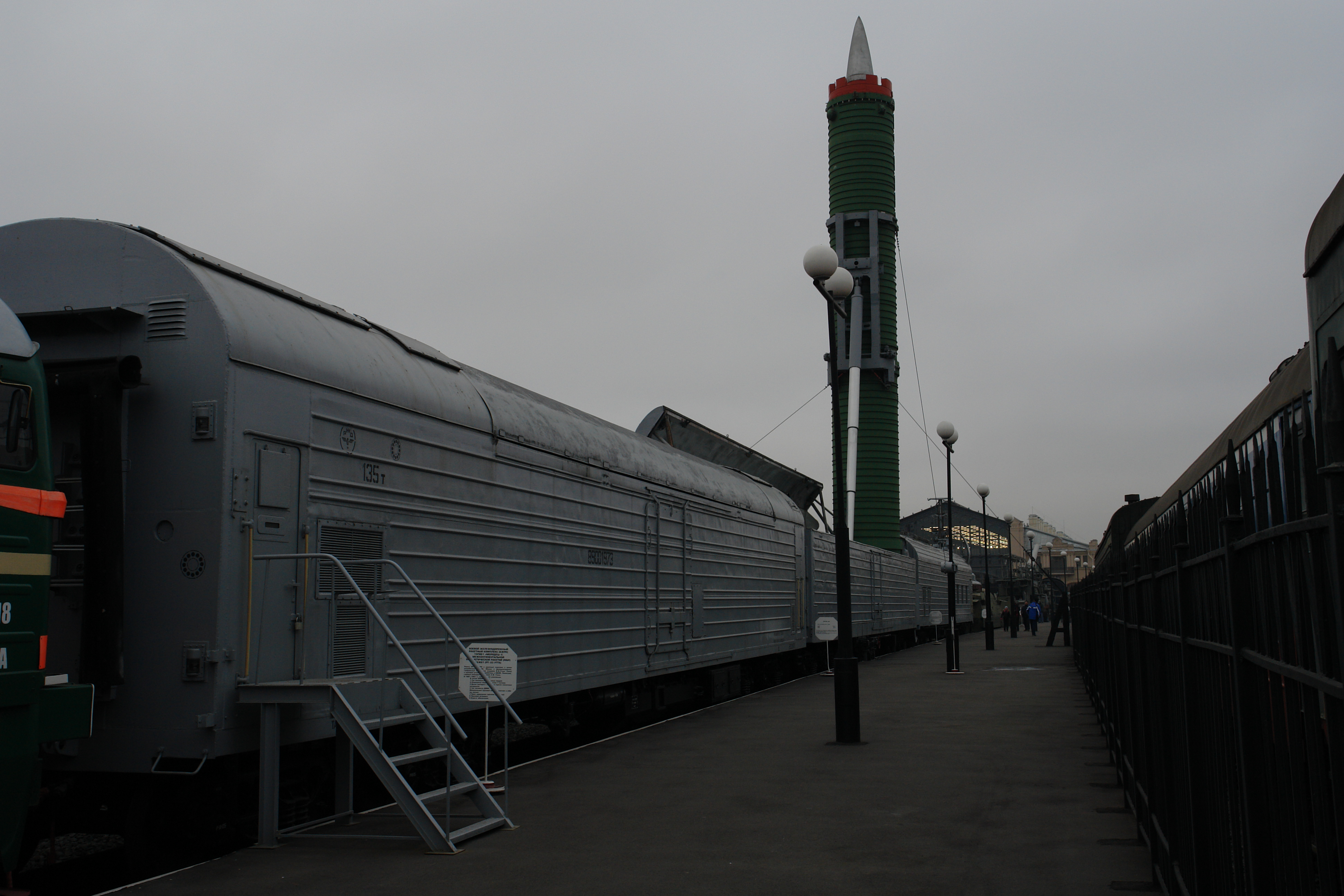
RT-23 BZhRK at Varshavsky railway station. Now moved to Russian Railway Museum.

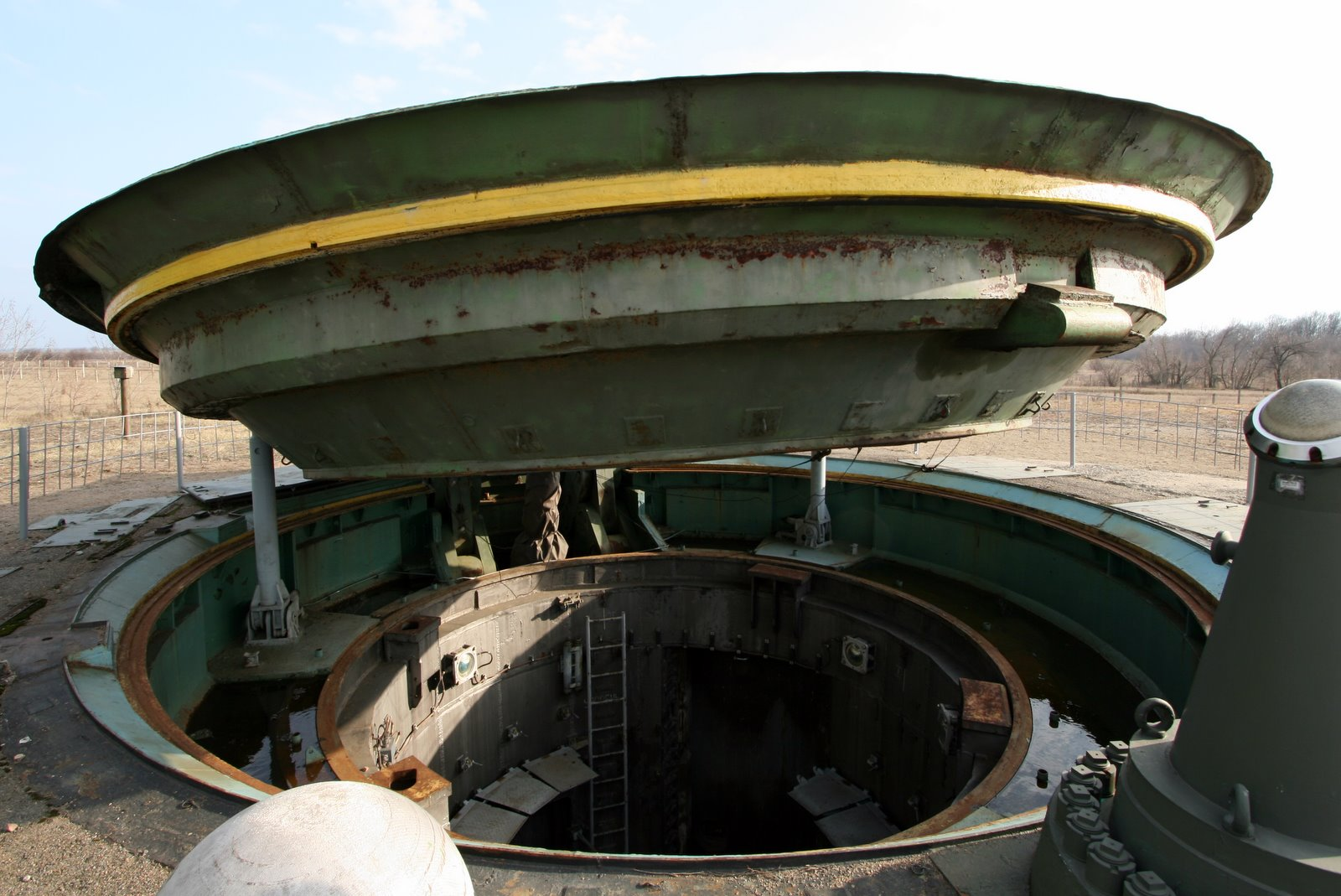
The only remaining RT-23 silo in Pervomaisk.

== See also ==
- BZhRK Barguzin
- DF-5
- DF-41
- LGM-30 Minuteman
- Peacekeeper Rail Garrison
- R-36 (missile)
- RS-24 Yars
- RS-26 Rubezh
- RS-28 Sarmat
- RT-2PM Topol
- RT-2PM2 Topol-M
- Strategic Missile Forces
- UR-100N
- Railway-borne Hwasong-11A (KN-23)
