= RT-21 Temp 2S =

RT-21 Temp 2S SS-16 Sinner
- Type: Intercontinental ballistic missile

Service history
- In service: 1976-1986
- Used by: USSR

Production history
- Designer: Alexander Nadiradze (Moscow Institute of Thermal Technology)
- Manufacturer: Votkinsk Machine Building Plant

Specifications
- Mass: 43,000 kg
- Length: 18,500 mm
- Diameter: 1,790 mm
- Warhead: Single 0.65-1.5 Mt warhead
- Engine: Three stage, solid-propellant
- Operational range: 10,500 km
- Guidance system: Inertial
- Accuracy: 450-1640 m CEP
- Launch platform: Mobile launcher vehicle

The RT-21 Temp 2S (Russian: Темп-2С, lit. 'pace') was a mobile intercontinental ballistic missile developed by the Soviet Union during the Cold War. It was assigned the NATO reporting name SS-16 Sinner and carried the industry designation 15Zh42 (15Ж42).

The RT-21 was the first mobile ICBM developed in the world. Its innovative concept and design were created by Alexander Nadiradze. The RSD-10 Pioneer and succeeding missile complexes relied on the RT-21 base concept and were used by Nadiradze for many of his later projects. The program became mired in a series of treaty complications, including questions regarding its use of theatre missile launchers. It is unlikely that the RT-21 ultimately reached deployment, and by the mid-1980s, the program had been scrapped. Its maximum period of storage on a launcher was 5 years, and preparation time for launch was 40 minutes.

== See also ==
- Strategic Rocket Forces
- RT-2PM Topol
- RT-2PM2 Topol-M
- RS-24 Yars
- RS-26 Rubezh
- RS-28 Sarmat
- R-36 (missile)
- UR-100N
- TR-1 Temp
