= SS-16 Temp-2S =

The SS-16 Temp-2s missile was the first attempt by the Soviet Union to develop a mobile ICBM. The missile project was designated SS-X-16 by Western intelligence and underwent several flight tests. The project was cancelled and the last missile firing took place in April 1976.

== Development ==
Temp-2S was the first Soviet project that was planned to develop the first road-mobile ICBM. The project began after a Council of Ministers published a decree on July 10, 1969 that gave development to the Moscow Institute of Thermal Technology. The development team was led by Chief Designer Alexander Nadiradze who is considered the “father” of mobile ICBMs. Nadiradze had a hand in developing several missile systems including; RT-21 Temp S2 (SS-16), RSD-10 Pioneer (SS-20) and the RT-2PM Topol (SS-25) ICBMs.

Temp-2s was a three-stage solid-propellant missile with autonomous inertial control system. The missile was planned to carry a single warhead and could be launched from a canister mounted on a mobile launcher. The launcher was planned to be installed on a wheeled chassis or landing gear. Temp-2S had a weight of 44 tons and was designed to deliver a payload of 940 kilograms. The system carried a single 0.65–1.5 megaton warhead and had a range of 9,000 kilometers.

Temp-2s had several flight tests that began in April 1972. Plesetsk was the main launch site and by the end of 1974, the site launched 26 missiles. The ICBM would be considered a failure and the last launches were conducted during April 1974. The number of missiles that were produced is unknown, but per western sources, the Votkinsk Mechanical Plant produced around 200 missiles and 60 were delivered to Plesetsk before the SALT II treaties were put into effect.

The Temp-2s systems were given to two missile regiments during February 1976. Per western intelligence, 50 missiles might have been stationed in Plesetsk by the middle of 1978. The Temp-2s was banned after the Soviet Union signed the Salt II treaty when pressured by the United States.

== SALT II Treaty ==
The Soviet Union agreed in the SALT II treaty to stop production and development of SS-16 type ICBMs. This included the halt of all production, testing, and deployment of Temp-S2 and not to produce the SS-16 third stage.
