= Aleksandr Nadiradze =

Soviet engineer (1914–1987)

- Александр Надирадзе ალექსანდრე ნადირაძე
- Born: 2 September 1914; Gori, Tiflis Governorate, Russian Empire
- Died: 3 September 1987 (aged 73); Moscow, Soviet Union
- Education: Sergo Ordzhonikidze Moscow Aviation Institute
- Known for: designing aircraft landing gears and turbo-jets. Development of anti tank shells, anti-aircraft missiles and radio controlled bombs. Creation of the first Soviet meteorological rocket M1-Meteo. Creation of the world's first mobile ICBM system RT-21 Temp 2S, followed by RSD-10 Pioneer, and RT-2PM Topol.
- Awards: Hero of Socialist Labour (twice)
- Scientific career
- Fields: Engineering (Defense)
- Workplaces: Transcaucasus Industrial Institute; Moscow Mechanical Institute; Central Aerohydrodynamic Institute; Moscow Institute of Thermal Technology numerous OKB's

Aleksandr Davidovich Nadiradze (Georgian: ალექსანდრე ნადირაძე, Russian: Александр Давидович Надирадзе; 2 September 1914 – 3 September 1987) was a Soviet engineer of Georgian ethnicity who was instrumental in the militarization of the former Soviet space program.

He designed various ballistics missiles, shells, and their delivery system, for which he is considered "father" of the mobile ICBMs, having created the RT-21 Temp 2S (SS-16), RSD-10 Pioneer (SS-20) and the RT-2PM Topol (SS-25). More modern weapons such as the RT-2PM2 Topol-M and RS-24 are mostly based on Nadiradze's work as well.

== Early life and career ==
Born in the town of Gori, Georgia, Nadiradze was raised in a teacher's family in Tbilisi. Initially working as an assistant in a small Georgian aerospace faculty, he made his first invention in May 1934. After finishing at the Transcaucasian Industrial Institute in 1936 he moved to Moscow and applied to the Moscow Aviation Institute. Two years later Nadiradze began working in the Central Aerohydrodynamic Institute (TsAGI) in which he led a team of engineers engaged in theoretical and experimental research of aircraft landing gears based on the principles of air cushions. He was also involved in the development of the Tupolev Tu-2 and early Soviet turbojet fighters. In 1941 he was appointed a chief designer in the Moscow OKB (Experimental Design Bureau) plant 22 (Gorbunov).

== Missile technology ==
At the end of 1941 Nadiradze started his work in the field of rocket design. During World War II he developed five versions of anti-tank shells, one of which had satisfactory results. In 1945 he got appointed chief designer and chief of the bureau of the Faculty of Missile weapons Moscow Mechanical Institute of the People's Commissariat of ammunition, functioning as experienced OKB guide holding lectures on the production and designing of missiles and launchers, while simultaneously conducting research on two-stage rockets and turbojets. In 1948 the Council of Ministers of the Soviet Union transferred the Moscow OKB institute to CB-2 Minelhozmasha and Nadiradze took command over a division which was developing unguided anti-aircraft missiles and anti-tank rockets. In 1950 he developed the Soviet anti-air missile system "Swift" and a year later the new KB-2 was incorporated into GSNII MSKHM-642, which basically merged diverse design bureaus working on cruise missiles, powder and radio-controlled bombs into one institute. In 1953 Nadiradze took charge of project "Raven". His experience was used to create the world's first high altitude meteorological rocket, development of which technically began back in 1949 at the Central Aerological Observatory Hydrometeorological Service of the USSR. The rocket was designed to deliver "instruments" into stratosphere. His involvement was of high importance since the first Soviet meteorological rocket MR-1 Meteo which was successfully launched in 1951 was also developed by Alexander Nadiradze himself. On 15 October the same year he would be tasked with the development of the so-called "Tshaika" radio-controlled bombs (UB-2000F). Tests were successfully completed in 1955 and the new weapon was accepted for service later that year. In late 1957 Moscow GSNII MSKHM-642 was combined with Reutov OKB-52 Chelomey. Nadiradze was appointed the head of Chelomey's secret development section and in 1961 took charge of the entire OKB, while remaining a chief designer. By decision of the Soviet government and defense ministry a competition for designing a mobile intercontinental ballistic missile (ICBM) was organized and Alexander Nadiradze's team won. He became the founder of the Soviet mobile intercontinental ballistic missile forces. On 6 March 1966 the defence ministry gave order to develop a mobile solid fuel ICBM. The project was named "Temp-20" which would then become the RT-21 Temp 2S. On 14 March 1972 testing of "Air-20" started at the state RVSN (Plesetsk Cosmodrome) in the Arkhangelsk region. Tests were completed in December 1974. This secret launch site was under command of the fellow Georgian Lt.General Galaktion Alpaidze who was in charge of the Soviet missile program and from 1975 was also a deputy director of the Moscow Institute of Thermal Technology. On 21 February 1976 two missile regiments of Temp-20s started their combat duty in Plesetsk.

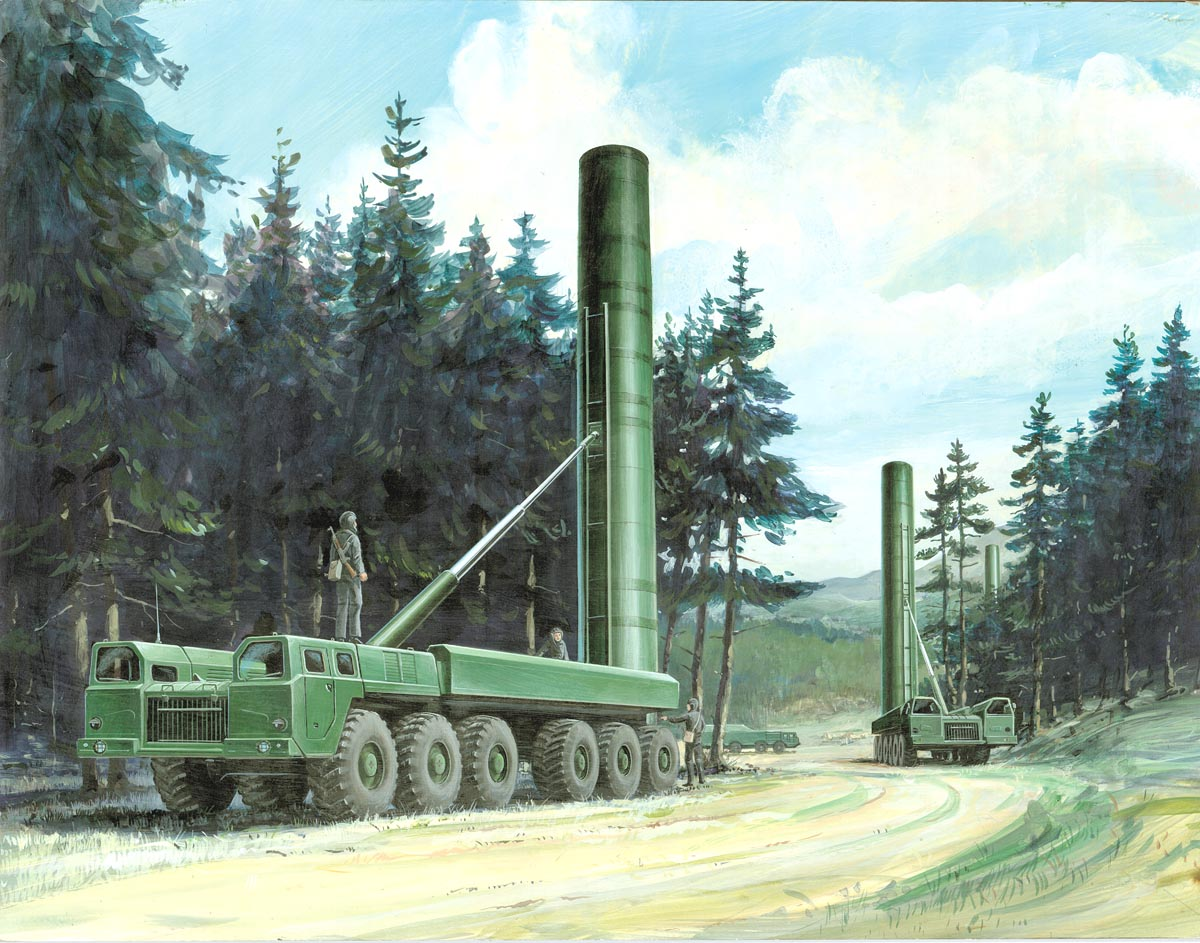
RSD-10 missile and its transporter erector launcher

Prior to that Nadiradze had already created the RSD-10 Pioneer in 1971 which was based on his earlier works on the Temp-2S. Its flight tests went exceptionally well and were completed on 9 January 1976. The mobile missile complex Pioneer was adopted and started its service from 11 March of the same year. His Pioneer would become the base for the later Topol missile. For his third great achievement in Soviet missile technology Nadiradze was awarded Hero of Socialist Labour (gold medal with hammer and sickle) and Order of Lenin. He then developed a heavily improved Pioneer-UTTH (NATO's designation SS-20 Mod 2) which would deliver warheads with three 5–50 kt MIRVs. The new system was adopted by Soviet Strategic Missile Forces on 28 April 1981. On 29 December 1981 Nadiradze was elected a full member (academician) of the USSR Academy of Science in the Department of Mechanics and Control Processes (theoretical and applied mechanics, mechanical engineering and engineering science). He was also awarded second Hero of Socialist Labour and fourth Order of Lenin by Presidium of USSR Supreme Soviet. When Secretary General Mikhail Gorbachev and U.S. President Reagan signed the Intermediate to Short-Range Missiles treaty on 8 December 1987, the USSR had to destroy 728 of its Pioneer missile complexes. The RT-2PM Topol whose development started by Nadiradze in 1977, was put into active service in 1988, and to this day remains a primary nuclear strike capability of the Russian Federation. The main challenge of the Topol project was to create a suitable battle management system, which was Nadiradze's main focus throughout the entire development. For this last project, Nadiradze received the USSR State Prize in 1987. His work was continued after his death by Boris N. Lapygin. This last achievement in mobile ICBMs stemmed from Alexandre Nadiradze's very first inventions. He wrote over 100 articles in scientific journals and registered over 220 inventions and operating guidelines. His work would prove to be vital for subsequent developments. He principally established a scientific base for missile systems which would be used by his followers and successors.

== Awards ==
- Lenin Prize (1964)
- Four Orders of Lenin (1968, 1974, 1976, 1982)
- Honoured Inventor of the RSFSR (1973)
- Order of the Red Banner of Labour (1974)
- Twice Hero of Socialist Labour (1976 and 1982)
- Order of the October Revolution (1984)
- USSR State Prize (1987)

In 1993 the Cosmonautics Federation of Russia and the Moscow Institute of Heat Engineering established a medal named after academician A.D Nadiradze. On the backside of the medal a mobile ICBM launcher is engraved.

Commemorative plaques in honor of A.D Nadiradze are installed in front of the main building of the same institutes.

== Death ==
Nadiradze lived and worked in Moscow until his death on 3 September 1987. He is buried at the Novodevichy Cemetery in Moscow (section 10). On the tombstone Nadiradze is portrayed holding a sheet of paper in his hands, conveying his zeal for inventions and his dedication to his work.
