= 2012 Moscow Victory Day Parade =

Russian military parade

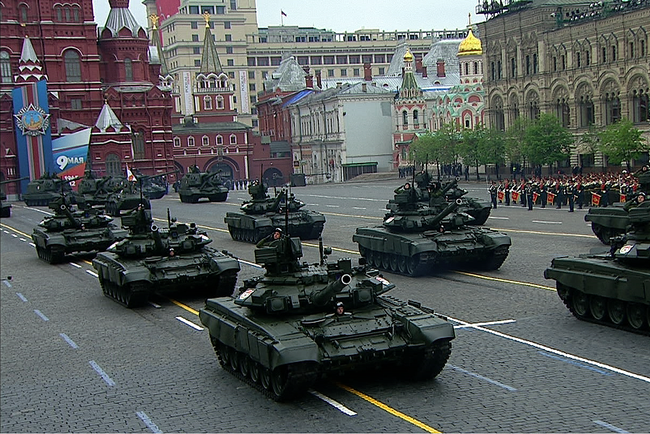
T-90 tanks at Moscow Victory Parade 2012

The 2012 Moscow Victory Day Parade was held on 9 May 2012 on Moscow's Red Square to commemorate the 67th anniversary of the capitulation of Nazi Germany in 1945. The parade marked the Soviet Union's victory in the Great Patriotic War on the very day on the signing of the German act of capitulation, on the very midnight of May 9, 1945 (Russian time). Newly inaugurated President of Russia Vladimir Putin made his ninth victory holiday address in this parade.

== Preparations ==
During October 2011, the parade's organisation started. Rehearsals began to be held by the various participating units.

Beginning from March 2012, in the parade practice site in Alabino, Moscow Oblast, parade rehearsal were held from the 19 of that month until 23 April, and from 21 and 22 April the parade's mobile column began its Moscow test runs.

Full rehearsals in Moscow itself started on the final Thursday of April and lasted until 6 May. These also included separate practice runs for the military bands and the mobile column.

== The event ==
Among the attendees were Prime Minister Dmitry Medvedev, the State Duma Chairman Sergei Naryshkin, and Moscow's Mayor Sergey Sobyanin. Over 14,000 troops participated in the ceremony. For the first time in a year, due to the massive unpopularity of the new battledress duty uniforms worn during the 2011 parade by almost all the parading units, all the participants, save for those in the mobile column, began wearing dress uniforms again. The entire marchpast segment for 2012 was composed of the following Russian uniformed services:

- Armed Forces of the Russian Federation
  - Russian Ground Forces
  - Russian Air Force
  - Russian Navy
    - Russian Naval Infantry
  - Russian Airborne Troops
  - Strategic Missile Troops
  - Russian Aerospace Defence Forces
  - Russian Railway Troops
- Border Guard of the Federal Security Service of the Russian Federation
- Internal Troops of the Ministry of Internal Affairs of the Russian Federation
- Ministry of Emergency Situations

The mobile column was composed of more than a hundred military vehicles from various military units and a squadron of Army Air Center Mi-8s carrying the flag of Russia and the flags of the Armed Forces flying past Red Square closed the parade segment.

The combined military band, conducted by Lieutenant General Valery Khalilov in what was his 10th Victory Day appearance as Senior Director of Music of the Military Band Service of the Armed Forces of the Russian Federation, had more than 1,100 bandsmen. For the first time in 3 years, it saw the return of the Alexander Suvorov's Corps of Drums from the Moscow Military Music School, which was leading the parade in its dark blue and red dress uniforms, as it has always done since the Moscow Victory Parade of 1945. The parade finale saw the bands perform the March Borodino and a special arrangement of Farewell of Slavianka', the latter being in honor of the centennial anniversary of its composition and the former being in honor of the bicentennial of the Patriotic War of 1812.

=== Music ===
Flag procession, Inspection, and Address

- Sacred War (Священная Война) by Alexander Alexandrov
- March of the Preobrazhensky Regiment (Марш Преображенского Полка)
- Slow March to Carry the War Flag (Встречный Марш для выноса Боевого Знамени) by Dmitriy Valentinovich Kadeyev
- Slow March of the Officers Schools (Встречный Марш офицерских училищ) by Semyon Chernetsky
- Slow March of the Guards of the Navy (Гвардейский Встречный Марш Военно-Морского Флота) by Nikolai Pavlocich Ivanov-Radkevich
- Slow March of the Tankmen (Встречный Марш Танкистов) by Semyon Chernetsky
- Slow March (Встречный Марш) by Evgeny Aksyonov
- Glory (Славься) by Mikhail Glinka
- Parade Fanfare All Listen! (Парадная Фанфара “Слушайте все!”) by Andrei Golovin
- State Anthem of the Russian Federation (Государственный Гимн Российской Федерации) by Alexander Alexandrov
- Signal Retreat (Сигнал “Отбой”)

Infantry Column

- Triumph of the Winners (Триумф Победителей)
- Air March (Авиамарш) by Yuliy Abramovich Khait
- Crew is One Family (Экипаж - одна семья) by Viktor Vasilyevich Pleshak
- March of the Cosmonauts/Friends, I believe (Марш Космонавтов /Я верю, друзья) by Oscar Borisovich Feltsman
- Artillery March (Марш Артиллеристов) by Tikhon Khrennikov
- We Need One Victory (Нам Нужна Одна Победа) by Bulat Shalvovich Okudzhava
- Ballad of a Soldier (Баллада о Солдате) by Vasily Pavlovich Solovyov-Sedoy
- We are the Army of the People (Мы Армия Народа) by Georgy Viktorovich Mavsesya
- To Serve Russia (Служить России) by Eduard Cemyonovich Khanok
- The Entry of the Red Army in Budapest (Вхождение Красной Армии в Будапешт) by Semyon Chernetsky
- March Youth (Марш "Молодёжный") by Valery Khalilov
- March Hero (Марш “Герой”) by an unknown author
- On Guard for the Peace (На страже Мира) by Boris Alexandrovich Diev
- On the Road (В Путь) by Vasily Pavlovich Solovyov-Sedoy
- Victory Day (День Победы) by David Fyodorovich Tukhmanov

Mobile and Air columns

- March General Miloradovich (Марш “Генерал Милорадович”) by Valery Khalilov
- Invincible and Legendary (Несокрушимая и легендарная) by Alexander Alexandrov
- March “Three Tankmen” (Марш “Три Танкиста”) by the Pokrass brothers
- March of the Soviet Tankists (Марш сове́тских танки́стов) by the Pokrass brothers
- Katyusha (Катюша) by Matvey Blanter
- March Victory (Марш “Победа”) by Albert Mikhailovich Arutyunov
- Artillery March (Марш Артиллеристов) by Tikhon Khrennikov
- Long Live our State (Да здравствует наша держава) by Alexander Alexandrov

Conclusion

- March Borodino (Марш “Бородино”) by I. Rayevsky
- Farewell of Slavianka (Прощание Славянки) by Vasily Agapkin

== Full list of participants ==
Colonel General Valery Gerasimov was the parade commander while the Minister of Defence of the Russian Federation, Anatoly Serdyukov, was the parade reviewing officer. For both, the 2012 Parade was their final appearance.

=== Military Bands ===
- Massed Military Bands of the Armed Forces, under the direction of the Senior Director of Music of the Military Bands Service of the Armed Forces of the Russian Federation, Lieutenant General Valery Khalilov
  - Central Military Band of the Ministry of Defense of Russia
  - Central Navy Band of Russia
  - Band of the Moscow Garrison
  - Other military bands of military educational institutions and independent ministries
- Corps of Drums of the Moscow Military Music School

=== Ground Column ===
- 154th Preobrazhensky Independent Commandant's Regiment Color Guard and Honor Guard Company of the 1st Honor Guard Battalion, 154th ICR
- Combined Arms Academy of the Armed Forces of the Russian Federation
- Military University of the Ministry of Defence of the Russian Federation
- Military Technical University of the Federal Agency of Special Construction
- Air Military Engineering University (first appearance)
- Fleet Admiral of the Soviet Union Nikolai Kuznetsov Naval Academy (first appearance)
- 336th Independent Naval Infantry Brigade
- Military Space Academy "Alexander Mozhaysky"
- Yaroslav Air Defense Senior College of Rocket Training and Research (first appearance)
- Peter the Great Military Academy of the Strategic Missile Forces
- 98th Guards Airborne Division
- 29th and 34th Independent Railway Brigades of the Russian Railway Troops (first appearance)
- 1st NBC Coastal Brigade
- 9th Chemical Disposal Regiment
- 45th Engineering Brigade
- Civil Defense Academy of the Ministry of Emergency Situations
- OMSDON Ind. Motorized Internal Troops Division of the Ministry of Internal Affairs of the Russian Federation "Felix Dzerzhinsky"
- Moscow Border Institute of the FSB
- 5th Independent Tamanskaya Guards Motor Rifle Brigade "Mikhail Kalinin"
- 4th Independent Kantemirovkaya Guards Tank Brigade "Yuri Andropov"
- 9th Independent Guards Motor Rifle Brigade
- 27th Independent Sevastopol Guards Motor Rifle Brigade
- 288th Independent Warsaw-Brandenburg Artillery Brigade
- Moscow Military Commanders Training School "Supreme Soviet of Russia"

=== Mobile Column ===
- GAZ-2975 Tigr
- Iveco LMV (first appearance)
- BTR-80
- T-90A
- 2S19 Msta
- Buk missile system
- Pantsir-S1
- S-400 Triumf
- Iskander-M
- Topol-M

=== Air Column Flypast ===
- Mil Mi-8 Hip Colors Party

== Rehearsals for 2012 Moscow Victory Day Parade ==
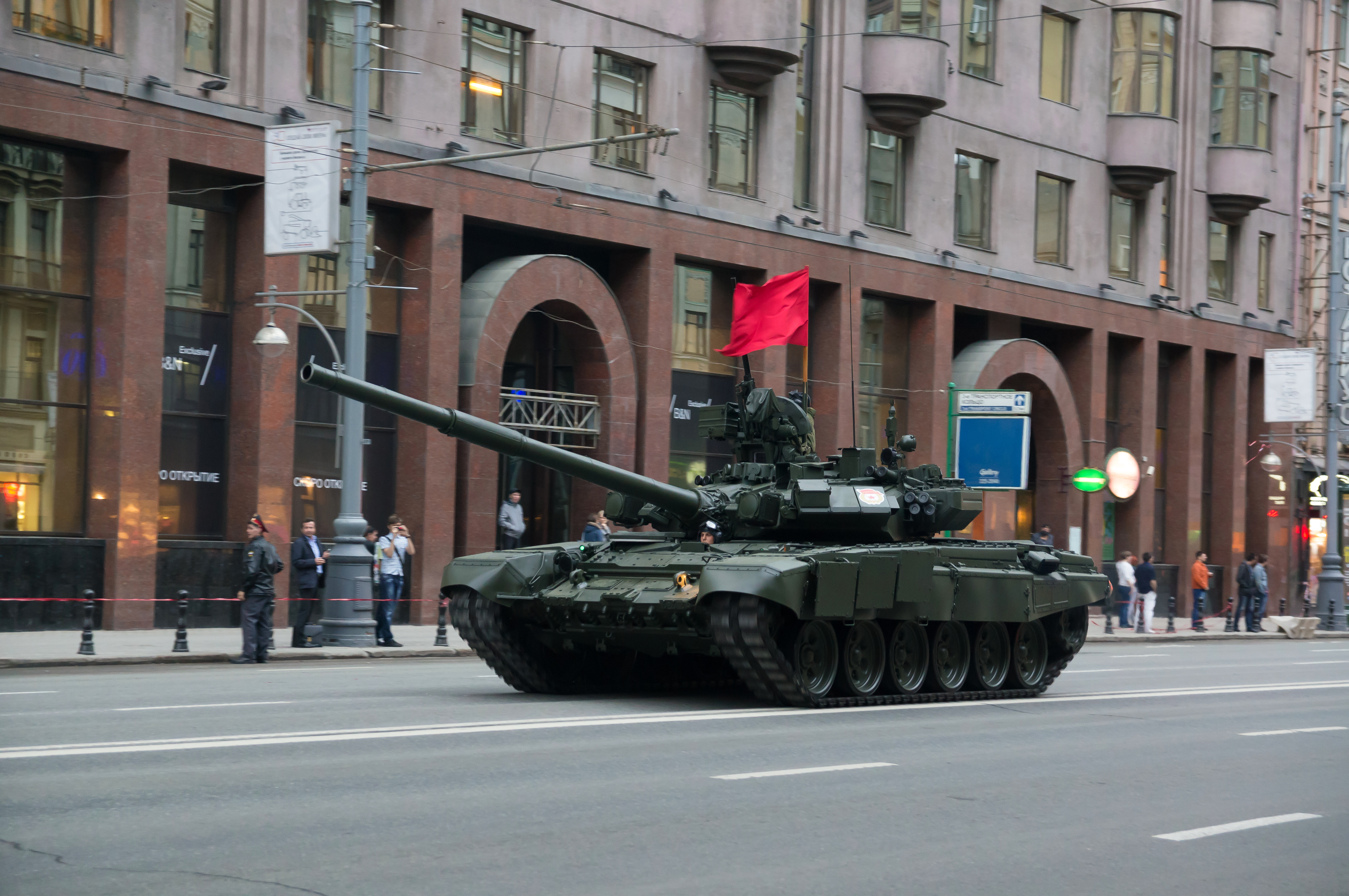

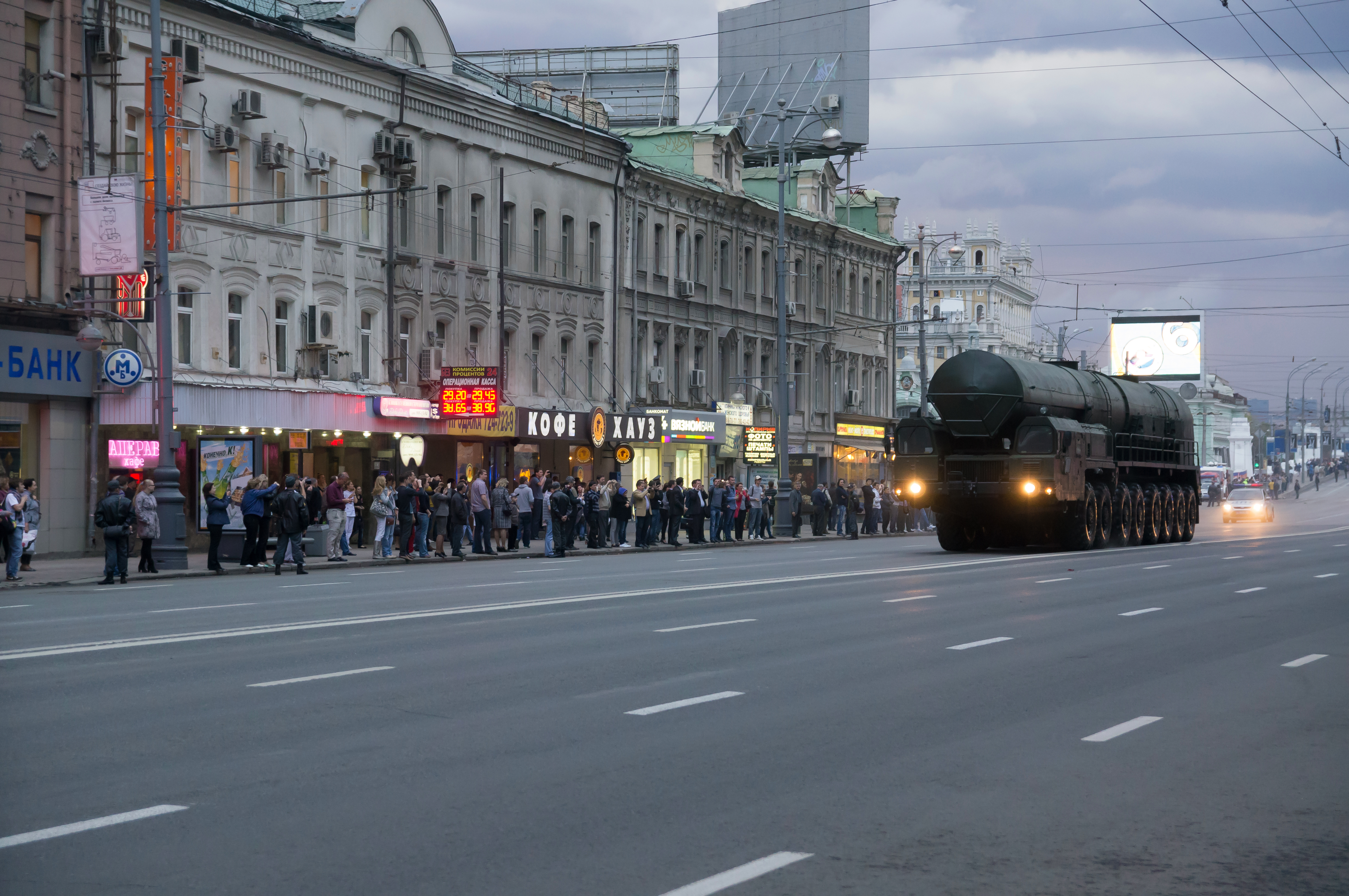

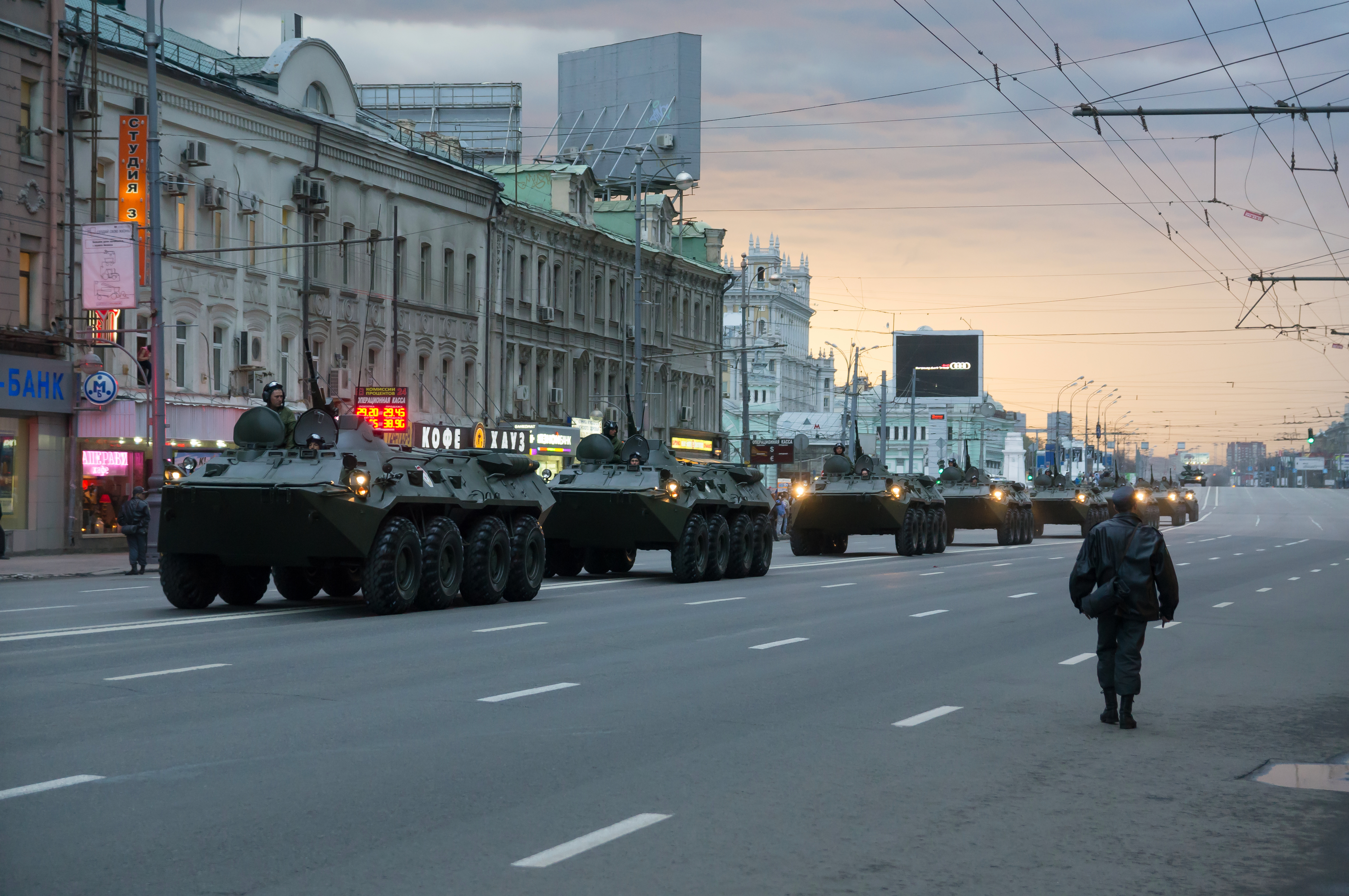

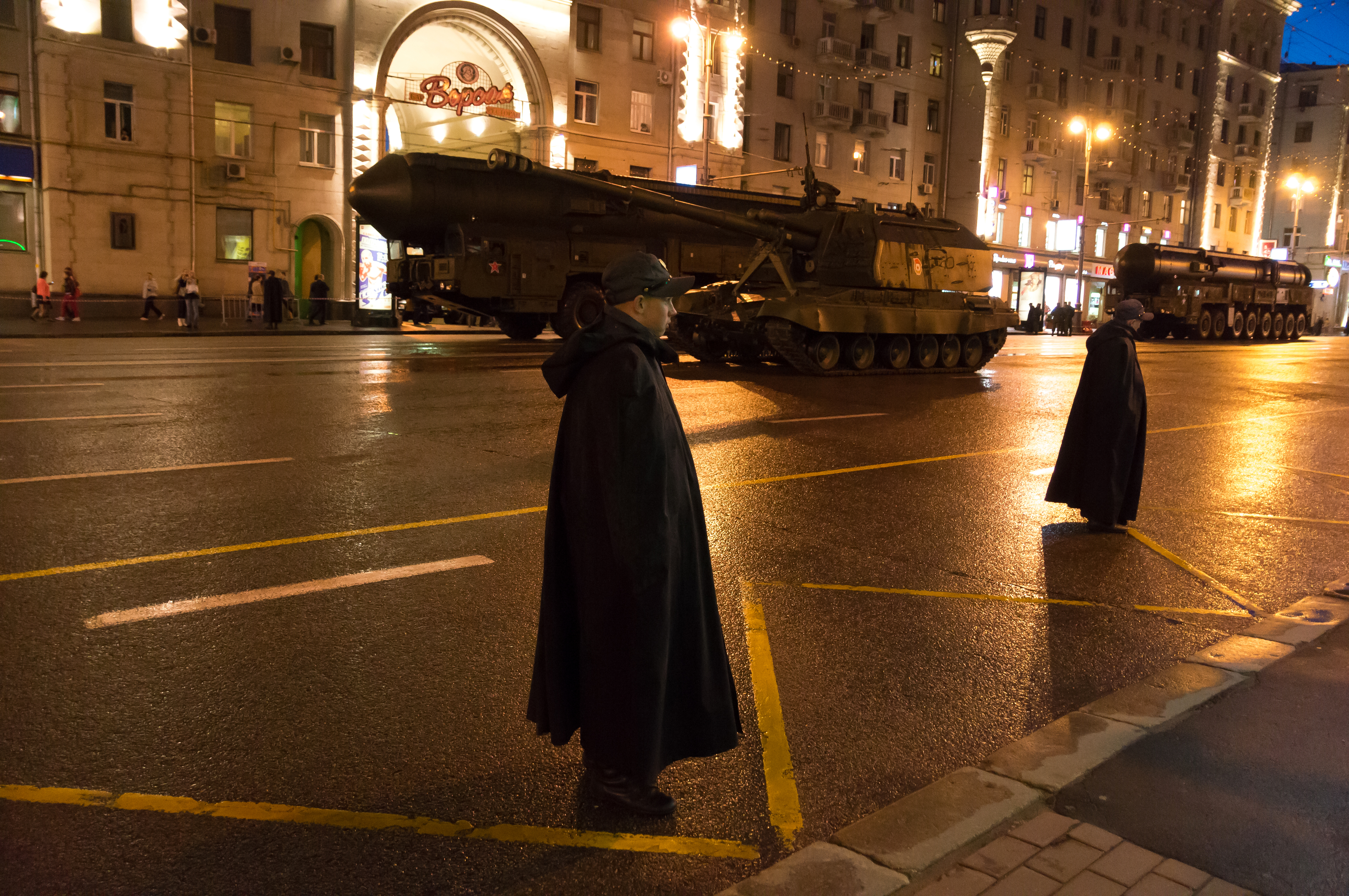

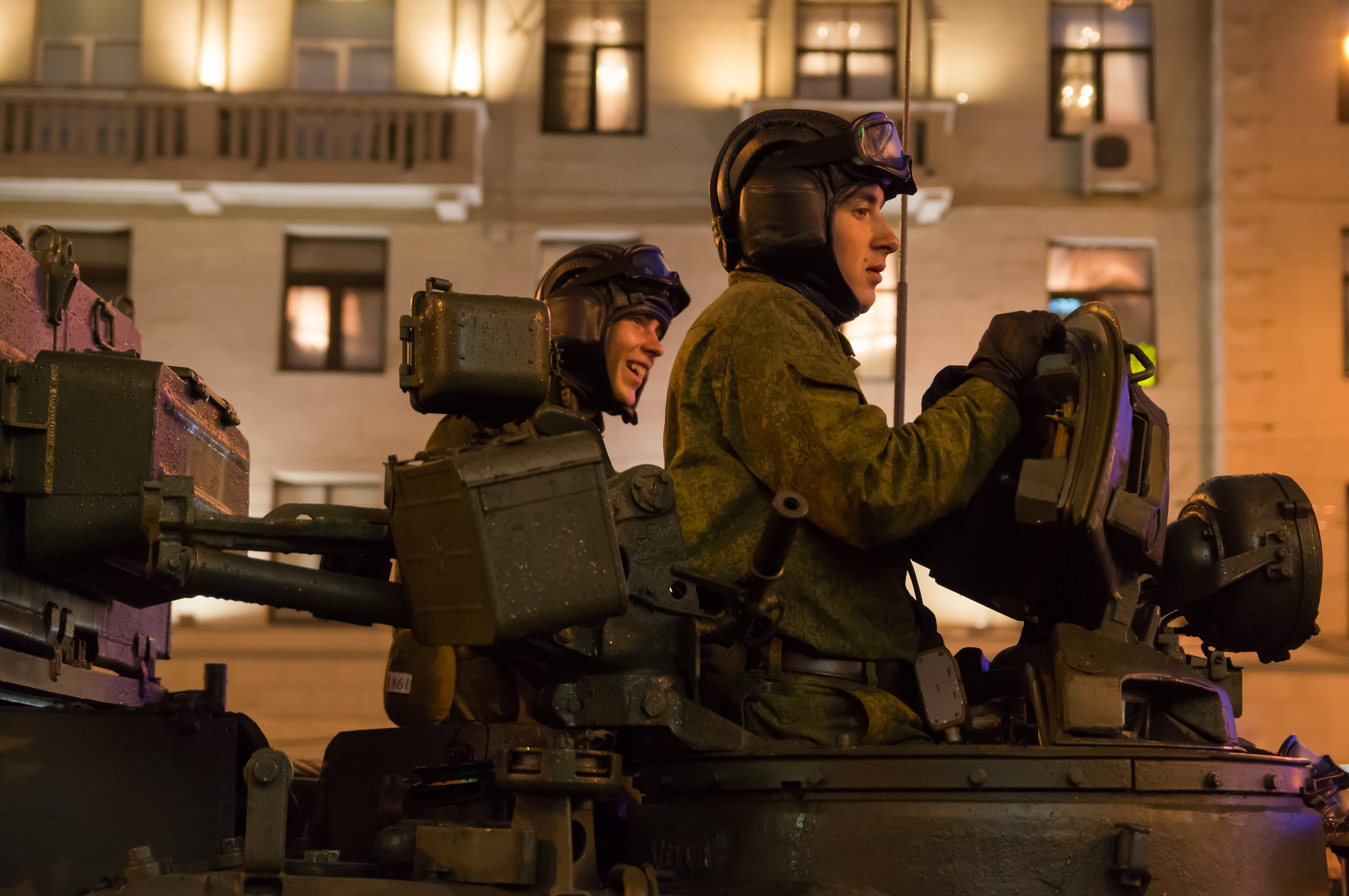

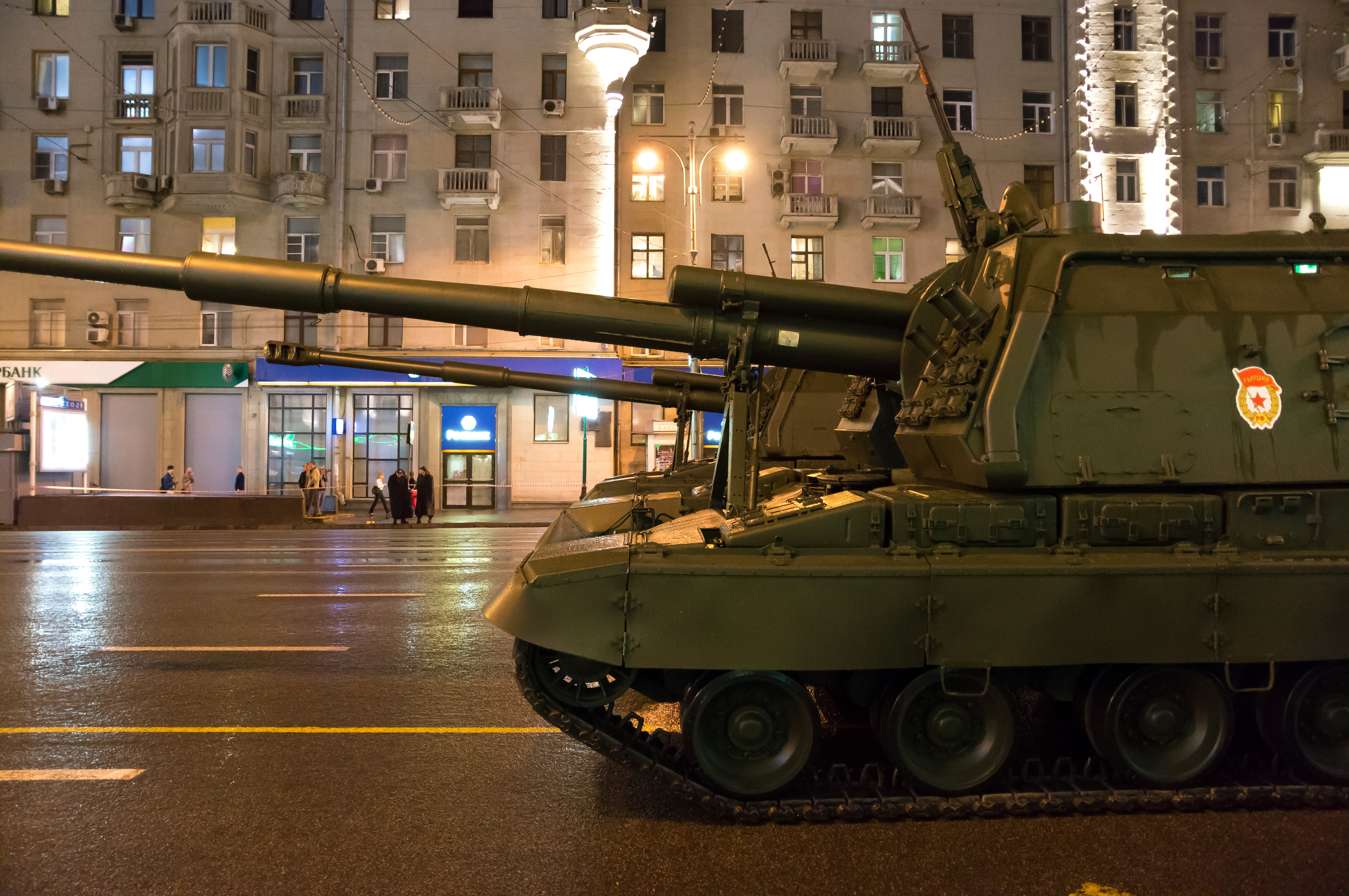

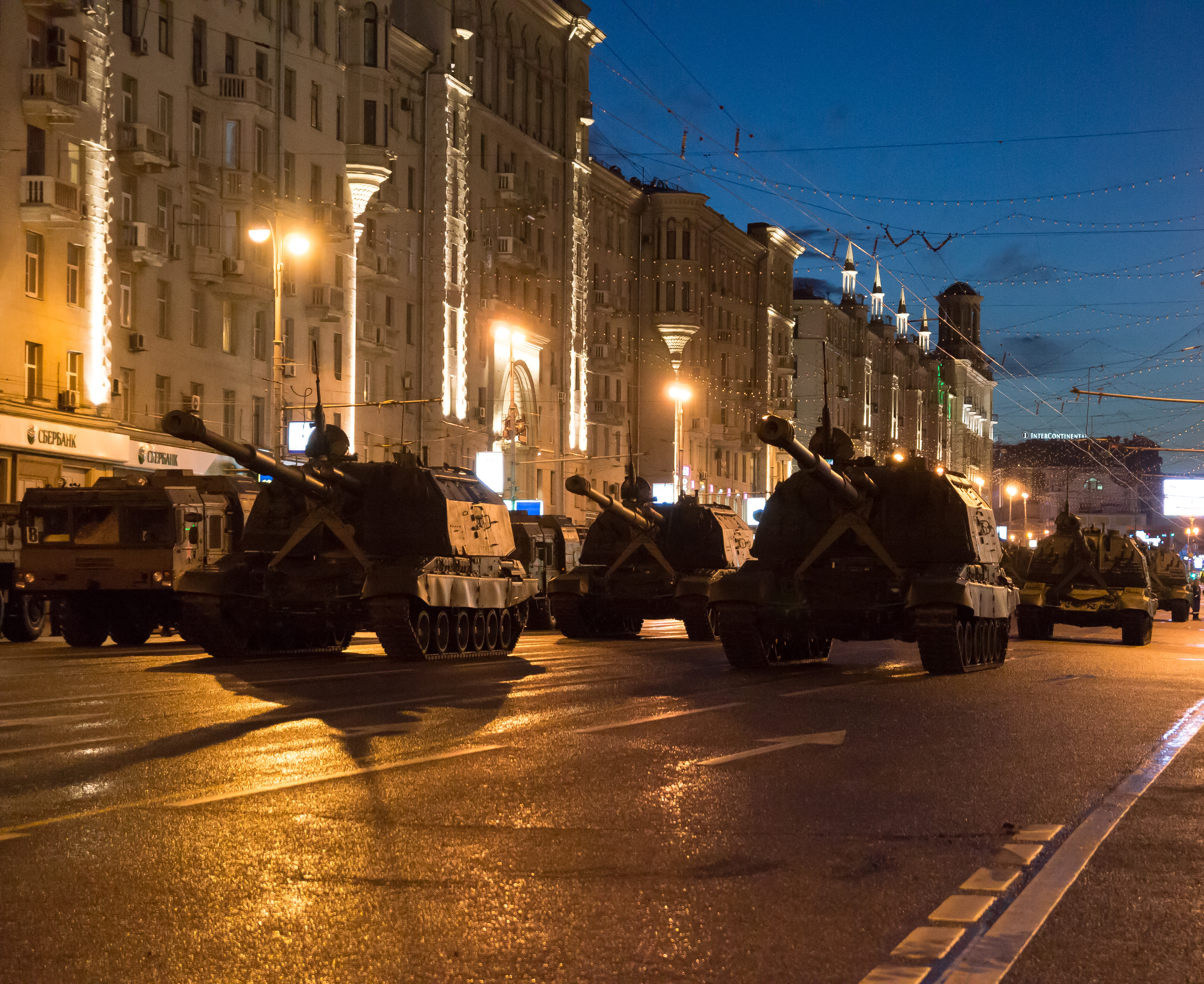

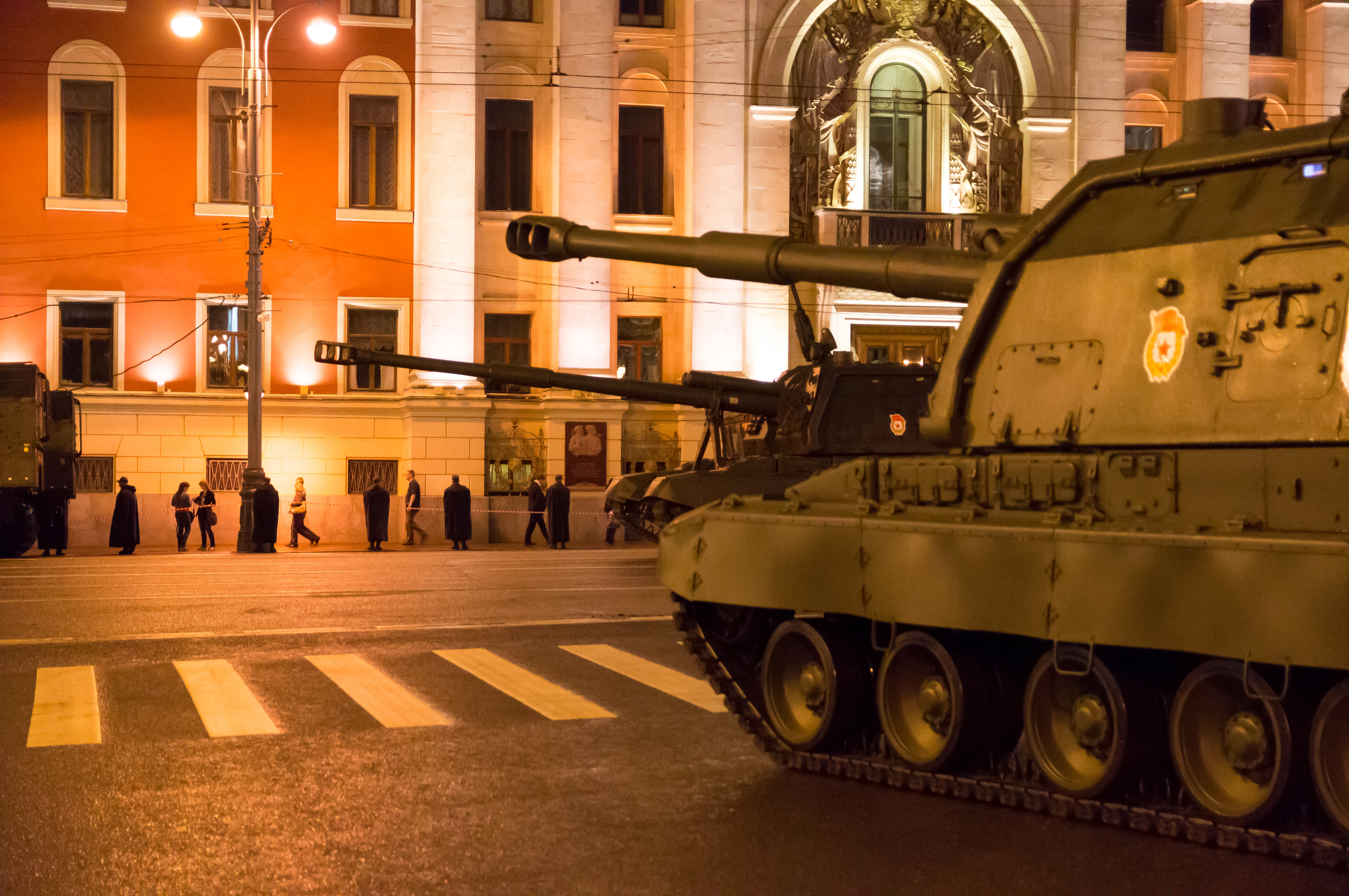

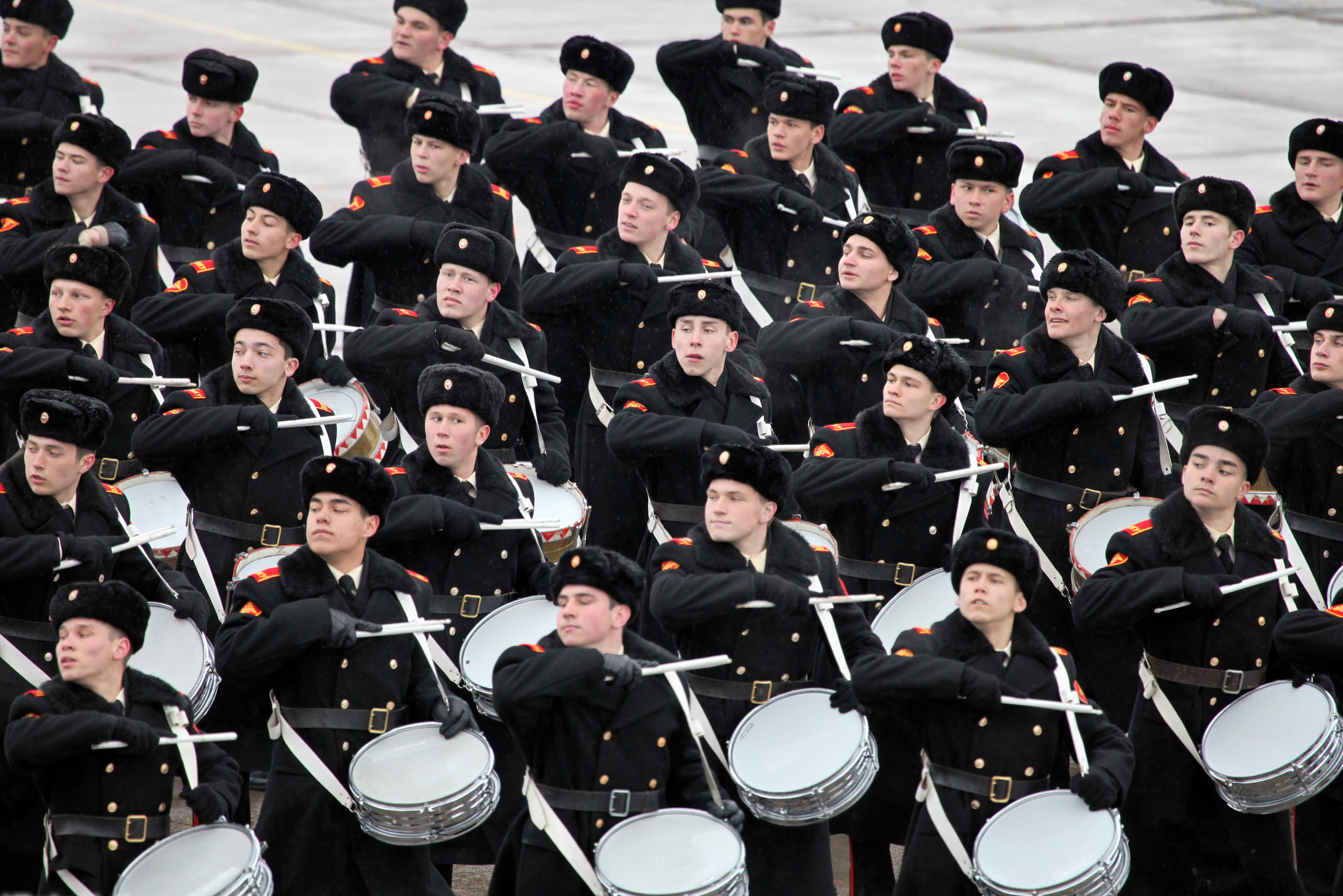

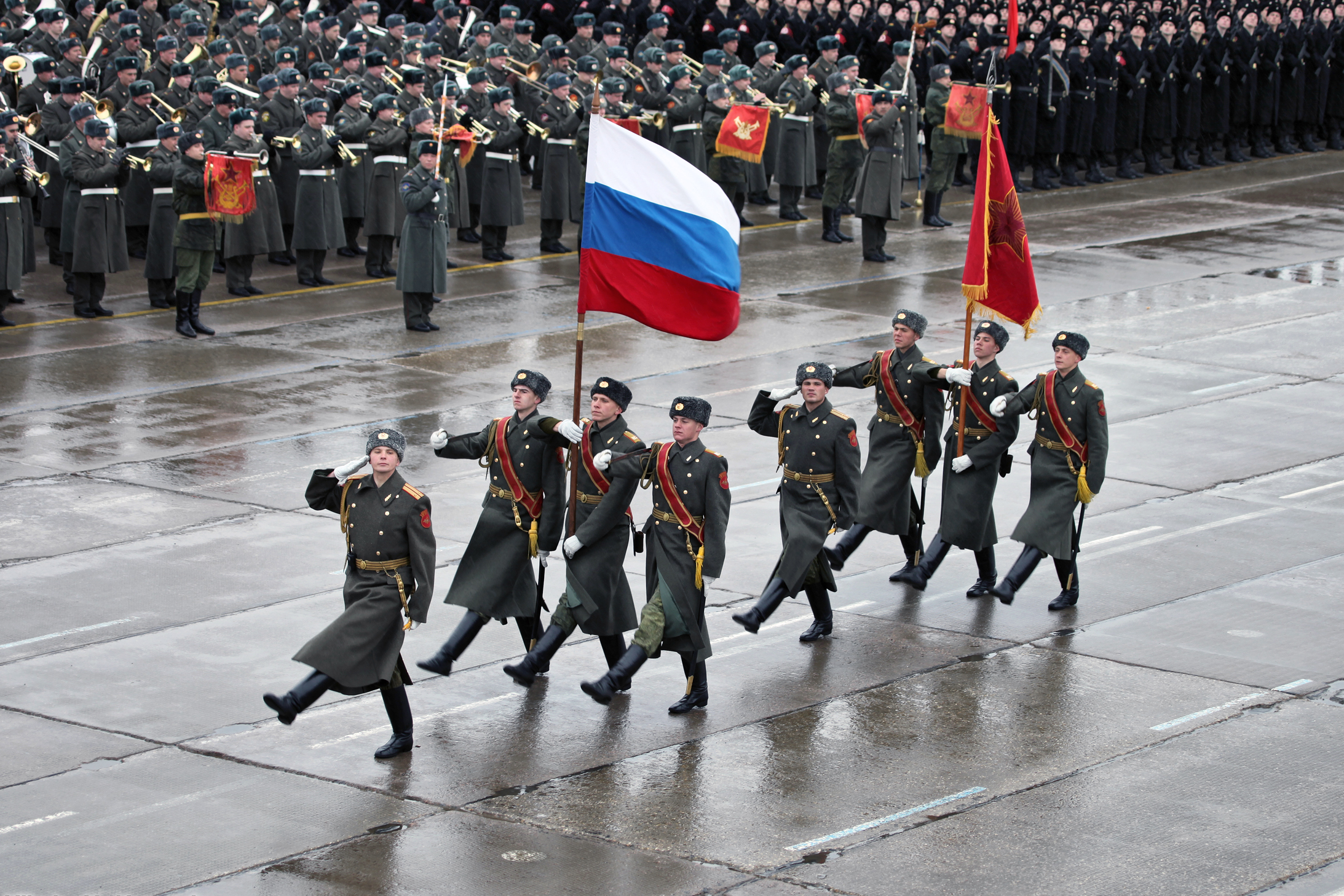

== See also ==
- Victory Day (9 May)
