= RS-26 Rubezh =

Russian intermediate-range ballistic missile

- Type: intermediate-range ballistic missile
- Place of origin: Russia

Service history
- Used by: Russian Strategic Missile Troops

Production history
- Designer: Moscow Institute of Thermal Technology
- Produced: 2011

Specifications
- Mass: 36,000 kilograms (80,000 lb)
- Warhead: 4x each 150/300 Kt MIRV, payload; modified version of Avangard 800 kilograms (1,800 lb)
- Engine: Solid-fueled (last stage or warhead block can have liquid)
- Propellant: solid, third or fourth stage (warhead block) can be liquid
- Operational range: 5800 km demonstrated
- Flight altitude: Several tens of km
- Maximum speed: over Mach 20 (24,500 km/h; 15,200 mph; 6.81 km/s)
- Guidance system: Inertial with GLONASS
- Accuracy: 90-250 m CEP
- Launch platform: Road-mobile TEL

The RS-26 Rubezh (Russian: РС-26 Рубеж, meaning frontier or boundary), designated by NATO as SS-X-31, is a Russian solid-fueled intermediate-range ballistic missile (IRBM) with a nuclear warhead, of which the range bracket just barely classifies it as an intercontinental ballistic missile (ICBM). It is equipped with a thermonuclear MIRV or MaRV payload, and is also intended to be capable of carrying the Avangard hypersonic glide vehicle. The RS-26 is based on RS-24 Yars, and constitutes a shorter version of the RS-24 with one fewer stages. The development process of the RS-26 has been largely comparable to that of the RSD-10 Pioneer, a shortened derivative of the RT-21 Temp 2S. Deployment of the RS-26 is speculated to have a similar strategic impact as the RSD-10.

== History ==
After an unsuccessful test launch in September 2011, it was test-launched successfully on 26 May 2012, from the Plesetsk Cosmodrome in north-western Russia, hitting its target minutes later 5,800 km away at the Kura Missile Test Range on the Kamchatka Peninsula. Further tests were performed successfully from Kapustin Yar to Sary Shagan in 2012 and 2013. In 2018, it was reported that procurement of the RS-26 by the state armament plan until 2027 (GPV-27) had been frozen, with funding diverted toward continued procurement of the Avangard hypersonic glide vehicle.

=== Rumored operational use ===
According to the Ukrainian Air Force and Ukrainska Pravda, on 21 November 2024, during the Russian invasion of Ukraine, the Russian Federation launched an unspecified number of conventionally armed (i.e. non-nuclear) RS-26 missiles, reportedly targeting critical infrastructure in the city of Dnipro in central Ukraine. Russian government spokesperson Dmitry Peskov was asked to confirm this, and at the time, replied that he "had nothing to say on this topic". A Western official stated that the missile used in the attack in question was not an ICBM. Later that day, Vladimir Putin confirmed that the strike had indeed not been performed by an ICBM, but a new model of IRBM, the Oreshnik, using a non-nuclear hypersonic payload.

== Political criticism ==
The missile was criticized by Western defense observers for indirectly breaching the (now defunct) Intermediate-Range Nuclear Forces Treaty (INF Treaty), which prohibited the U.S. and Russia from possessing nuclear and conventional ground-launched ballistic missiles, cruise missiles, and missile launchers with ranges of 500–5,500 km (310–3,420 mi). The RS-26 missile was demonstrated with a light or no payload, extending its range beyond the proscribed 5,500 km (3,400 mi) limit of the treaty; however, all subsequent tests were flights with significantly shorter ranges that fell within the treaty prohibitions. The RS-26 was twice tested at a distance of about 2,000 km (1,200 mi). According to The National Interest, the RS-26 is exactly the same concept and a direct replacement for the RSD-10 Pioneer—known to NATO as the SS-20 Saber—which was banned under the INF treaty.

The RS-26 is designed to pose a strategic threat to European capitals and has the ability to target NATO forces in Western Europe. According to an article by Jeffrey Lewis entitled "The problem with Russia's missiles", the purpose of these weapons is to deter Western forces from coming to the aid of NATO's newer eastern members that are located closer to Russia's borders.

== See also ==
- Agni-V – (India)
- DF-41 – (China)
- DF-5 – (China)
- LGM-30 Minuteman – (United States)
- R-36 (missile) – (Soviet Union)
- RS-28 Sarmat – (Russia)
- RT-2PM Topol – (Soviet Union)
- RT-2PM2 Topol-M – (Russia)
- Strategic Missile Troops
- UR-100N – (Soviet Union)
