= Votkinsk Machine Building Plant =

Russian defense company

Coordinates: 57°03′00″N 53°58′50″E

- Company type: Joint-stock company
- Industry: Defence
- Founded: 1759
- Headquarters: Votkinsk, Russia
- Products: Ballistic missiles, Submarine-launched ballistic missiles
- Parent: Moscow Institute of Thermal Technology
- Website: vzavod.ru

JSC Votkinsk Machine Building Plant (Russian: Воткинский завод) is a machine and ballistic missile production enterprise based in Votkinsk, Republic of Udmurtia, Russia. Its production includes the RS-24 Yars intercontinental ballistic missile, as well as the submarine-launched Bulava SLBM.

Incorporated as a Federal State Unitary Enterprise until 2010, it is now an open joint-stock company.

The company has two separate facilities: a final assembly plant located some 12 km outside of Votkinsk where missiles are assembled, and the main plant, located in downtown Votkinsk, where missile components as well as civil and consumer goods are produced.

During the Russian-Ukrainian War the plant expanded its workforce by 2,500, built a new sheet metal facility, imported CNC machine tools from China, and increased production of a number of missile lines, including ICBMs. On 20 February 2026, Ukraine's General Staff targeted the plant in a strike with FP-5 Flamingo missiles.

== History ==
=== The plant from its foundation until 1917 ===
During the mid-18th century, there arose a need for ironworks due to the depletion of forests around the existing mining operations in the Urals. This led to increased costs in transporting firewood from far-off areas, putting a strain on production expenses. To combat this issue, it was determined that the most practical solution would be to move the production facilities to regions with plentiful forests. As a result, the Izhevsk ironworks was founded between the years 1760 and 1763 with the sole aim of addressing this particular concern.

The primary factor in choosing the plant's location was its convenient proximity to the Kama River, which is located about 15-20 km from the present-day city of Votkinsk. In addition to this, the decision also took into consideration the availability of nearby forests, which were crucial for providing the necessary energy for the iron and steel industry during that period. Furthermore, the plant was strategically situated close to mining companies for easy access to essential resources.

Between the years of 1754 and 1763, a total of 42 privately owned factories were established in the Russian Empire. These plants were prestigious establishments, owned by esteemed individuals such as Count Pyotr Shuvalov and Count M. E. Vorontsov. In 1763 with the death of Shuvalov, the factories in Votkinsk and Izhevsk were transferred to the control of the state. This decision was made in order to settle the debts left behind by Shuvalov.

The plants went on to manufacture anchors, railway equipment, ships, drilling machines, gold mine tractors, and various military equipment. Notably, starting in 1773, under the directive of Catherine the Great, the factory commenced the production of steel anchors for national military shipbuilding. Furthermore, during the initial half of the 19th century, the plant accounted for no less than 62% of the total anchor output in Russia.

In 1811, the plant began its production of steel and cast iron, a feat that was considered highly advanced for its time. This achievement was made possible by the ingenuity of engineer Badaev, a self-taught metallurgist who revolutionized the industry with his innovative and game-changing method. The steel that was produced at this plant boasted an exceptional level of quality. This high-quality steel was then utilized in the manufacturing process of an extensive array of tools, ranging from metal cutting instruments to medical equipment and even stamping devices. The plant's ability to produce such a diverse range of tools showcased its versatility and adaptability, solidifying its status as a pioneer in the field of metallurgy.

The skilled craftsmanship exhibited by the craftsmen in Votkinsk, as they were granted the opportunity in 1858 to undertake the construction and assembly of the framework for the tower of the Saints Peter and Paul Cathedral in St. Petersburg. In 1871, the plant embarked on the construction of Russia's second open-hearth furnace and the first in the Urals. Additionally, it diligently supplied armored steel for the nation's military shipbuilding purposes.

In the 1840s, under Ilya Petrovich Tchaikovsky's supervision, the enterprise was reorganized, shifting from purely metallurgical work to machine building. By 1847 the plant started producing boats, and, in 1868, steam locomotives. The plant was near a small shallow river and lacked connectivity to the country's railway network. As a result, the production of steam ships and other vessels had to be completed before the annual spring floods. To accomplish this, reservoirs were created by constructing weirs on the enterprise's premises. When the spring arrived, the reservoirs filled with a significant amount of meltwater, which used to flood the entire shipyard area, allowing newly constructed ships to float. Once the sluice gates were opened, the newly built steam ships descended the Votka and Siva rivers, eventually reaching the Kama River. Approximately 400 ships of various types were constructed. Similarly, during the annual spring flood season, steam locomotives were transported from the plant to the nearest railway station using specialized barges. This practice continued until 1916, when the plant finally became connected to the national railway network. In total, the plant produced a total of 631 steam locomotives from different series.

By the end of the nineteenth century, as the Trans-Siberian Railway was being constructed, the plant started manufacturing steel components for bridges. In 1915, the Ironworks became the top contributor in terms of the total length of bridges constructed in the Russian Empire. Over time, the company's focus shifted towards the production of steam locomotives, which accounted for approximately 40% of its manufacturing capacity.

=== From 1917 until 1957 ===
During the Russian Civil War, the factory was heavily looted by all warring parties, and as a result it basically ceased operations and was closed in 1922. On 9 September 1925 the factory reopened as a manufacturer of agricultural machinery.

Between 1930 and 1937, the plant was controlled by the All Heavy Industry Union. It produced high-performance steam and gold drilling machines.

On January 1, 1938, the plant was transferred to the USSR People's Commissariat of Defence Industry of the USSR and switched to the production of ammunition and weapons. On March 11, 1938, it was renamed Plant Number 235.

At the outbreak of the Great Patriotic War in 1941, the factory began production of the 45mm M1937 antitank cannon and, starting from 1943, the 76mm M1942 divisional gun.

From the early post-war period until 1957, the factory produced 100 mm air defence gun KS-19 and 57 mm anti-tank gun M1943 (ZiS-2). It also produced civilian products, such as agricultural traction engines, narrow-gauge locomotives and tower cranes.

=== Missile production (from 1957 to the present time) ===
In 1957, by the resolution of the Central Committee of the Communist Party of the USSR and the Council of Ministers of the USSR, the enterprise was converted into the country's primary producer of ballistic missiles for the Soviet armed forces. The following year, the plant delivered the first short-range attack missiles 8A61 developed by the Design Bureau-1 with a liquid-fuelled engine and with a range of 150 km, adopted in July 1955.

Also, the plant produced a nuclear modification of 8A61 called 8К11, and starting from 1960, its successor was released - the tactical ballistic missiles 8K14 developed by the Design Bureau-385 with a range of up to 300 km. This rocket was mass-produced for over 25 years and used by the Armed Forces of the Union of Soviet Socialist Republics for more than 30 years.

In 1962, by resolution of the Central Committee of the Communist Party of the USSR and the Council of Ministers of the USSR, the Votkinsk Machine Building Plant started to master the production of more powerful tactical missiles 9M76, being a part of the mobile theatre ballistic missile TR-1 Temp. The first missile systems rolled out of the plant in 1966.

"TR-1 Temp" was the first missile system with a solid-fuelled piloted ballistic rocket adopted by the Armed Forces of the USSR. Subsequently those missiles were terminated in accordance to the Intermediate-Range Nuclear Forces Treaty between the US and the USSR from 8 December 1987.

In 1974, the plant began to produce 15ZH42 intercontinental missiles for the mobile intercontinental ballistic missile complex SS-16 Sinner, in 1975 - the intermediate-range ballistic missiles 15ZH45 for the complex SS-20 Saber, in 1976 - the short-range attack missiles 9M714 for the complex OTR-23 Oka, and in 1989 - the tactical missiles 9M79-1 fot the complex OTR-21 Tochka.

In 1998, the plant launched the production of one of the most recent intercontinental ballistic missiles 'RT-2PM2 Topol-M'.

In 2006 the plant started mass production of '9K720 Iskander' missiles.

== Production ==
Prime Minister Vladimir Putin touring the Votkinsk plant on 21 March 2011 with a Topol-M ICBM in the background

The company's products include R-11/SS-1B Scud-A and B SRBMs; RT-21M/SS-20 Saber and SS-23 Spider IRBMs; RT-21 (SS-16 Sinner), RT-2PM (SS-25 Sickle) and RT-2PM2 Topol-M (SS-27 Sickle-B) ICBMs. It also manufactures oil and gas equipment, refrigeration equipment, metal-cutting equipment, castings, forgings, stampings and domestic electric appliances.

Votkinsk was also responsible for the production of the Cold War era SS-20 intermediate-range ballistic missile and many other well-known designs by the Moscow Institute of Thermal Technology.

=== Missiles ===
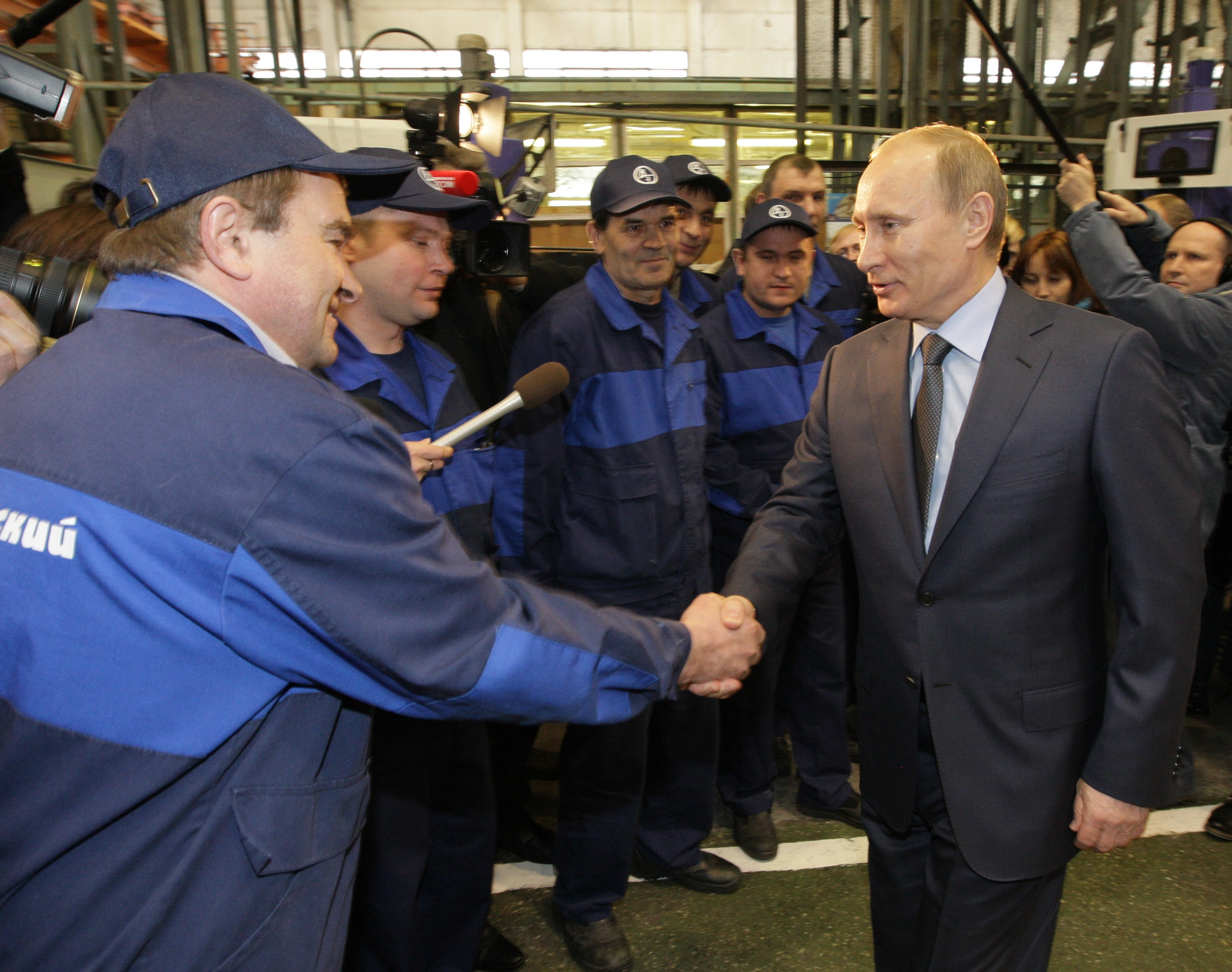
Prime Minister Vladimir Putin meeting employees of the Votkinsk Plant

- R-17 Elbrus (Discontinued)
- RT-21M Pioneer (Discontinued)
- RT-21 Temp 2S (Discontinued)
- RT-2PM Topol (Discontinued)
- RT-2UTTH Topol M (Discontinued)
- RS-24
- RSM-56 Bulava

== See also ==
- United Rocket and Space Corporation
