= Moscow Institute of Thermal Technology =

Russian Engineering and Scientific Research Institute

Coordinates: 55°51′20″N 37°36′11″E

- Industry: Arms industry Aerospace industry Space industry
- Founded: 1946; 79 years ago
- Headquarters: Moscow, Russia
- Products: Ballistic missiles, Submarine-launched ballistic missiles, Launch vehicles
- Revenue: $1.51 billion (2014)
- Owner: Federal Agency for State Property Management
- Parent: Roscosmos
- Website: corp-mit.ru

Moscow Institute of Thermal Technology (MITT; Russian: Акционерное общество «Корпорация Московский институт теплотехники», lit. 'JSC Corporation "Moscow Institute of Thermal Technology"') is a Russian engineering and scientific research institute founded on May 13, 1946. The institute is located in the Otradnoye District in the north of Moscow.

Previously, it was primarily focused on developing ballistic missiles and rockets to increase the nation's strategic deterrent capability. Today, it is also involved in civilian projects and has modified some of its intercontinental ballistic missiles into launch vehicles to be used for satellites. The name can also be translated as Moscow Institute of Thermal Equipment.

== History ==
April 19, 1945, the State Defense Committee of the USSR issued a decree №8206 ordering the People's Commissar for Armament Boris Vannikov to create a weapons design bureau and a pilot plant for missiles. Following this resolution, in 1945 was created the Central Design Bureau GTSKB 1 was created under the People's Commissariat for Armament (the Commissariat for military ammunition and other such things); the GTSKB-1 was actively engaged in collecting materials from the German rocket technology. During the post-war reorganization of the Soviet economy in early 1946 the People's Commissariat for Armament was transformed into the Ministry of Agricultural Engineering of the USSR.

A decree of the Council of Ministers of the USSR №1017-419ss from May 13, 1946 ordered the Ministry of Agricultural Engineering to create a research institute of rocket propellants based on GTSKB-1.

May 15, 1946 Order No. 114ss of the Minister of Agricultural Engineering created Research Institute № 1 (NII-1) as part of the 6th Main Directorate; NII-1 fulfilled the requirement of establishing a research institute of rocket propellants based on GTSKB-1. May 18, 1946 by order number 118ss, NII-1 (formerly GTSKB 1) was incorporated into the newly formed General Directorate for Jet Technology Ministry. In 1947, the order № 126 of the Minister approved the Regulations on the institute NII-1 (the organization of the same name existed in many sectors, which was considered an additional condition of secrecy work).

In 1966 the institute was transferred to the jurisdiction of the Ministry of the Defense Industry. In March 1966 NII-1 was given its current name. Aleksandr Nadiradze was the chief designer of the institute from 1967 to 1987.

In July 2009 the institute's General Director and Chief designer Yuri Solomonov resigned after the July 15, 2009 test launch failure of Bulava naval-based ICBM designed by MITT.

== Structure ==
Companies included in JSC MITT:

- TSNIISM
- Federal Research and Production Center Altai
- Votkinsky Zavod
- Federal Research and Production Center Titan Barrikady
- Izhevsk Motor Plant Axion-Holding

== Rockets and missiles ==
- Start-1
- RPK-9 Medvedka
- TR-1 Temp
- SS-16 Sinner
- RT-2PM Topol
- RT-2PM2 Topol-M
- RS-24 Yars
- RSM-56 Bulava
- BZhRK Barguzin
- RS-26 Rubezh

== See also ==
- Titan-Barrikady
