= RT-2PM Topol =

RT-2PM Topol SS-25 Sickle
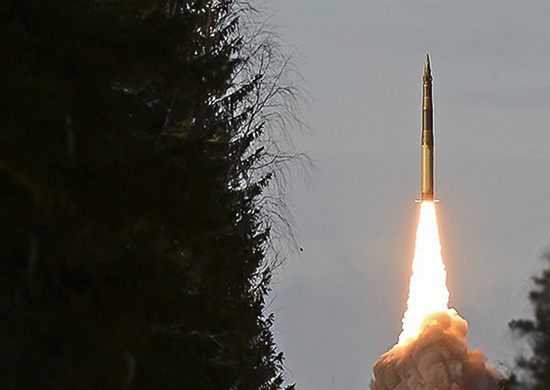
- Topol test-launched from Plesetsk Cosmodrome
- Type: Intercontinental ballistic missile
- Place of origin: Soviet Union

Service history
- In service: 1985–2023
- Used by: Russian Strategic Rocket Forces

Production history
- Designer: Alexander Nadiradze(Moscow Institute of Thermal Technology), continued after his death by Boris N. Lapygin.
- Manufacturer: Votkinsk Machine Building Plant
- Produced: 1985

Specifications
- Mass: 50,100 kg (110,500 lb)
- Length: 23.5 m (77 ft)
- Diameter: 2.17 m (7 ft 1 in)
- Warhead: 1 x 800 kt or 1 x 1 Mt
- Engine: Three-stage Solid-fuel rocket
- Operational range: 11,000 km (6,800 mi)
- Maximum speed: approx. 7.4 kilometres per second (27,000 km/h; 17,000 mph; Mach 22)
- Guidance system: Inertial, autonomous
- Accuracy: 200-900m m CEP
- Launch platform: Road-mobile TEL

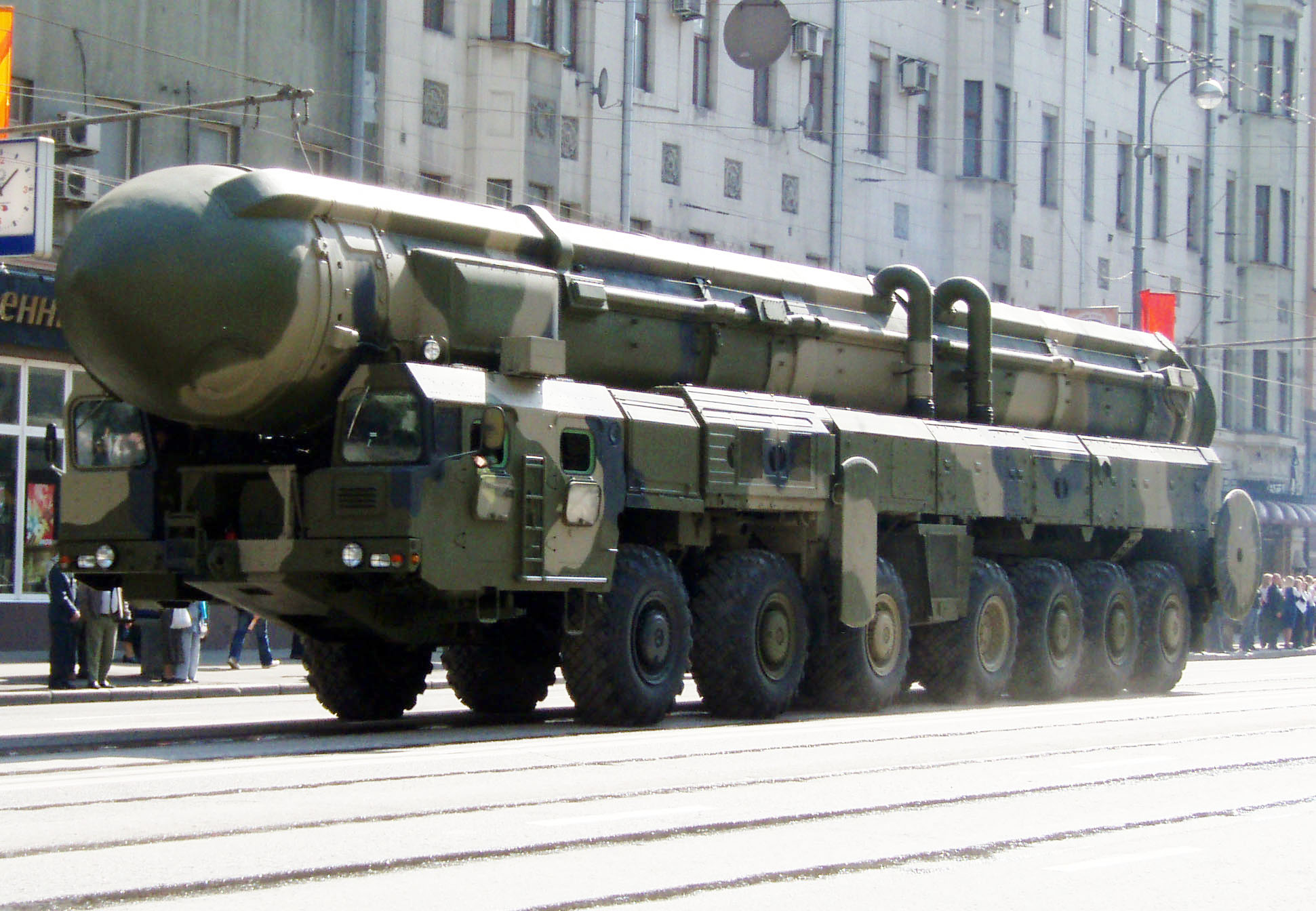
MAZ-7917 TEL vehicle

The RT-2PM Topol (Russian: РТ-2ПМ Тополь ("Poplar"); NATO reporting name SS-25 Sickle; GRAU designation: 15Ж58 ("15Zh58"); START I designation: RS-12M Topol) was a mobile intercontinental ballistic missile designed in the Soviet Union and in service with Russia's Strategic Missile Troops. As of 2014, Russia planned to replace all RT-2PM ICBMs with versions of Topol-M. In December 2023, the last Topol regiment was taken off combat duty.

== Development ==
The three stage solid propellant RT-2PM Topol is an improved mobile ICBM which replaced earlier outdated missile complexes. It drew on technologies developed for earlier mobile missile programs such as the RT-21 Temp 2S and the RSD-10 Pioneer, and was deployed to replace several aging Soviet ICBM systems, including variants of the UR-100. The United States developed and tested the road-mobile MGM-134 Midgetman ICBM, but the program was canceled with the end of the Cold War.

Development of the RT-2PM was approved on 19 July 1977 and carried out by the Moscow Institute of Thermal Technology headed by Alexander Nadiradze. Flight tests were conducted on the Plesetsk test site from February through December 1985. The main problem that had to be overcome during this period was the development of battle management system. After the first test series was successfully conducted in April 1985, with the first regiment with Topol missiles put on alert in July 1985. Throughout this time work continued on improving the battle management system. The test missile firings were finally completed in December 1987. The first regiment of "Topol" missiles employing a modernized mobile command center (in the area of Irkutsk) were put on alert on 27 May 1988. After Nadiradze's death in 1988 Boris N. Lapygin continued his work on the Topol missile.

== Design ==
The RT-2PM ICBM was designed to be road mobile and is mounted on a heavy truck (MAZ-7310 or MAZ-7917).

The RT-2PM is a road mobile 3-stage, single warhead ICBM. Its 23,500 mm length and 2,170 mm diameter are approximately the same size and shape as the U.S. Minuteman ICBM. It has a throw-weight of 1,400 kg and carries a single warhead with a yield of 800-1,000 kt and accuracy (CEP) of 900m. It can fire from field deployment sites or through sliding roof garage bases. The RT-2PM Topol joined operational Soviet SRF regiments in 1985. A total area of approximately 190,000 square kilometers could be required to deploy a force consisting of 500 road-mobile Topol ICBMs. Mobile units require a much higher number of personnel for maintenance and operation than fixed systems. Consequently, the RT-2PM Topol was significantly more costly to maintain and operate than silo launched systems.

All three stages are made of composite materials. During first stage operation the flight control is implemented through four aerodynamic and four jet vanes. Four similar trellised aerodynamic surfaces serve for stabilization. During the second and third stage of flight gas is injected into the diverging part of the nozzle for flight control.

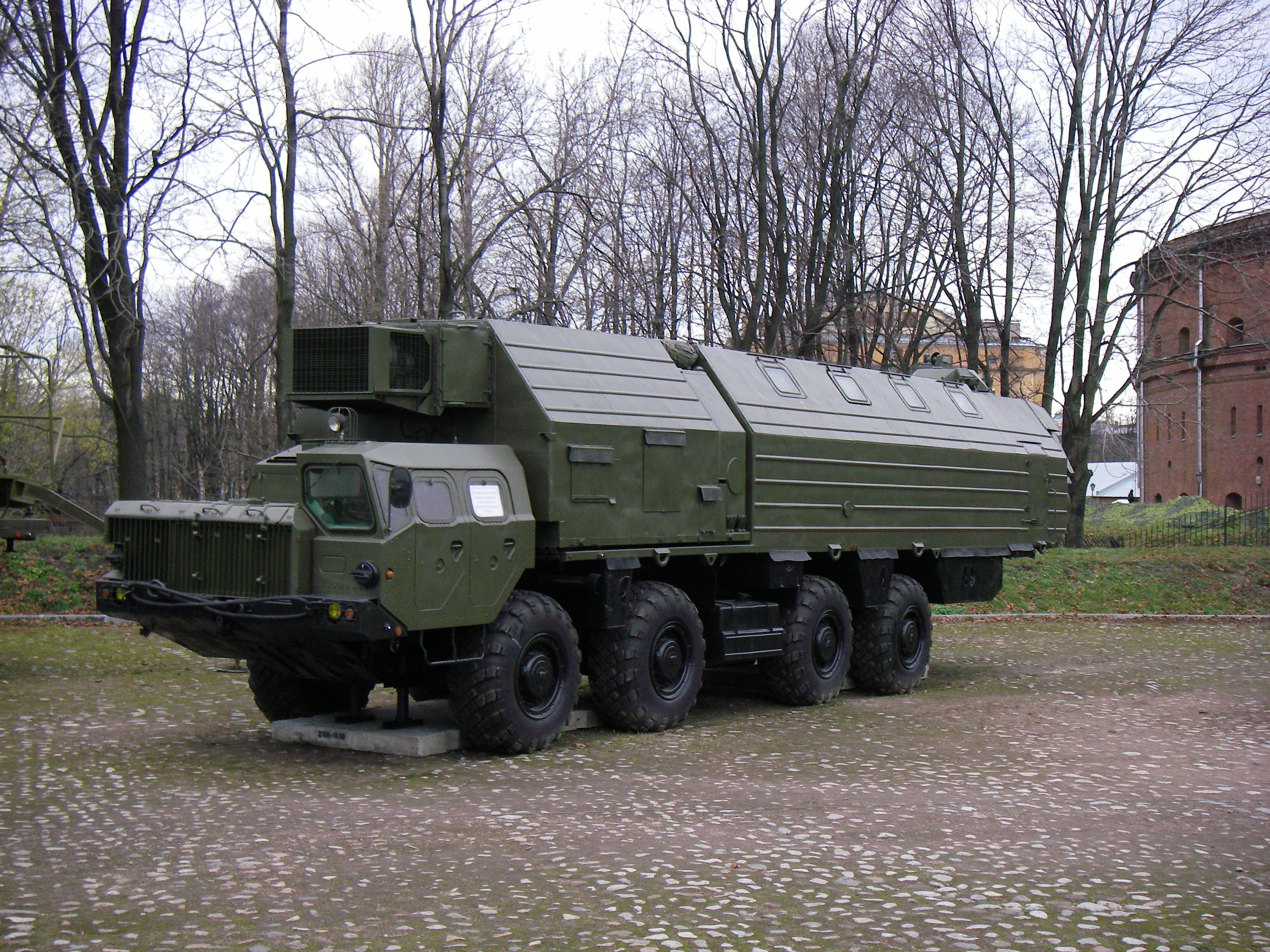
Launch-Assisting Support vehicle of Topol at the Saint-Petersburg Artillery Museum

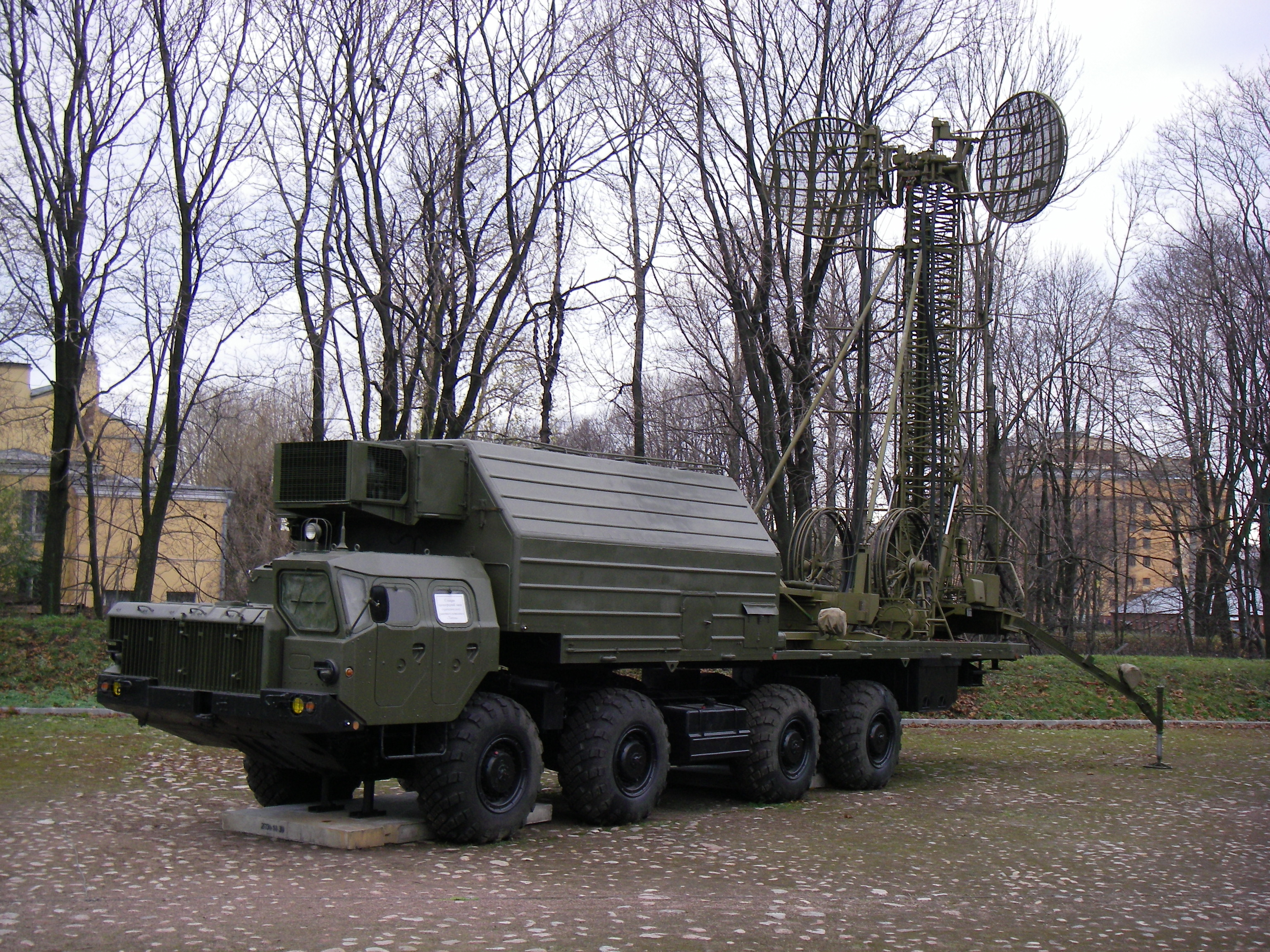
Troposphere Relay Station vehicle of Topol at the Saint-Petersburg Artillery Museum

The missile is deployed in a Transporter Erector Launcher (TEL) canister mounted on cross-country 7-axle chassis on a mobile launch vehicle. The chassis incorporates jacks, gas and hydraulic drives and cylinders, with a power of several hundred tons, for jacking and leveling of the launcher, speeding up (combat) and slowing down (maintaining) elevation of the container with the missile in the vertical position. The TEL is accompanied by a Mobile command post, carrying support facilities mounted on cross-country 4-axle chassis with unified vans. The complex is equipped with an onboard inertial navigation system which gives the TEL group the capability to conduct the launch independently from its field deployment sites. This topo-geodesic support and navigation subsystem, created by the "Signal" Research Institute, provides a quick and highly precise tie-in of the launcher in a field position and enables its crew to carry out missile launches from any combat patrol route point. The launch can also be carried out at regimental bases from the aforementioned garrison garage.

== Operational history ==
RT-2PM missile scheme

At the time of the signing of the START I Treaty in 1991 the Soviet Union had deployed some 288 Topol missiles. Deployment continued, and at the end of 1996 a total of 360 Topol missiles were deployed.

The Topol missile was deployed at previously developed deployment sites. After the INF Treaty was signed in 1987 several RSD-10 Pioneer deployment sites were adapted to launch the Topol missiles. The United States expressed specific concerns during the INF treaty negotiations. When the RT-2PM missile system was deployed in the field, with its missile inside the canister and mounted on the launcher, the US contended that the canister might conceal an RSD-10 Pioneer missile. This was of concern because unlike the single warhead of the RT-2PM Topol, the RSD-10 carried up to 3 warheads. A resolution was reached after the Soviet Union agreed to allow inspection parties to use radiation detection systems to measure fast neutron intensity flux emanating from the launch canister. A launch canister with a missile inside containing a single warhead, such as the RT-2PM Topol, emitted a different pattern of fast neutrons than did one with a missile having three warheads, such as the RSD-10.

Provisions of the SALT II agreement prohibited the deployment of more than one new missile (which became RT-23UTTh), it was officially declared by the Soviet Union that the RT-2PM Topol was developed to upgrade the silo based RT-2. The US government disputed this view, contending that the missile was clearly more than 5% larger and had twice the throw-weight as the RT-2 and therefore constituted a new missile system. Marshal Nikolai Ogarkov, Soviet Chief of General Staff cancelled the September 1, 1983 test flight of the RT-2PM Topol which was to be launched from Plesetsk (the launch site in northwest Russia used for test firing of solid fuel propellant ICBMs)- 24 minutes later to land in the Klyuchi target area on the Kamchatka Peninsula. The night of the scheduled launch was the night that Korean Air Lines Flight 007 was shot down after accidentally intruding Soviet airspace over Kamchatka.

An RT-2PM Topol with two MIRVs may have been tested in 1991, and the missile was tested at least once with four MIRV warheads, but there has apparently been no further development of a multiple warhead version. This became a point of contention during the conclusion of the 1991 START negotiations, at which time the US pressed for a definition of "downloading" (removing warheads from missiles) that would complicate any Soviet attempt suddenly to deploy multiple warheads on the RT-2PM Topol.

Russia plans to reequip approximately 400 silos where obsolete UR-100, RT-2 and MR-UR-100 missiles are located. Under the START II Treaty, which is a non-binding agreement, Russia would be able to place 90 single-warhead solid fuel missiles in reequipped R-36 silos. In order to guard against a break-out scenario involving the rapid reconversion of R-36 silos on-site inspection became a very important aspect of START II verification.

=== Post-Soviet period ===
The breakup of the Soviet Union had a significant impact on the Topol program. The dispersed manufacturing of ICBM components seriously complicated researching and building new missile systems. For example, the Minsk Wheeled Truck-Tractor Manufacturing Plant in Belarus manufactured the missiles' transporter launchers, and some 90% of the components of the guidance system were manufactured in Ukraine.

In Belarus, as of December 1995, 63 RT-2PM Topol ICBMs originally deployed there had been returned to Russia. As of December 1995, Belarus had two operational mobile RT-2PM Topol regiments remaining on its territory, with a total of 18 nuclear warheads. In July 1992, Belarus signed an agreement with Russia placing the regiments under exclusive Russian control. In September 1993, Moscow and Minsk signed an agreement requiring the return of these nuclear missiles and all related missile support equipment to Russia by the end of 1996. A total of 81 RT-2PM Topol ICBMs and associated warheads were returned to Russia from Belarus.

By the late 1990s the lack of resources and qualified personnel forced the Strategic Rocket Forces to cut back operations considerably, with no more than one or two regiments of the mobile RT-2PM Topol missiles dispersed in the field. The remaining 40 or so regiments, each with nine single-warhead missiles, remain in garrison.

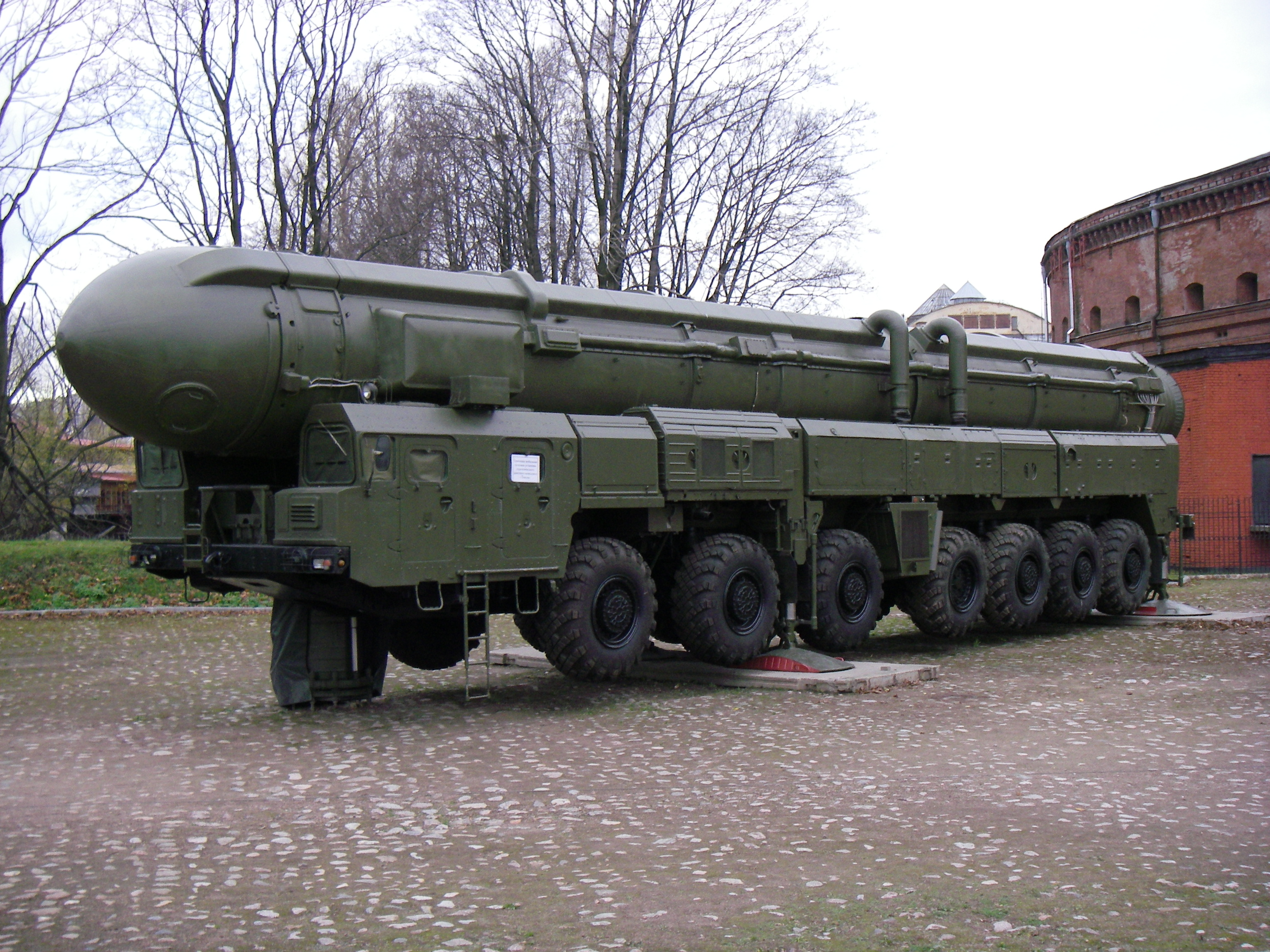
Topol TEL in Military Historical Museum of Artillery, Engineers and Signal Corps

=== Recent history ===
On 18 October 2007, another successful test launch was conducted. One Topol from a mobile launcher at Plesetsk test site reached its target on Kamchatka. As the Strategic Rocket Forces representative reported, it allowed for the extension of Topol's service life to 21 years.

Another test of the RT-2PM Topol was carried out on Thursday, August 28, 2008. The launch was said to be specially tasked to test the missile's capability to avoid ground-based detection systems.

Another test was conducted on 12 October 2008 when a Topol was launched from the Plesetsk test site in northern Russia. The missile, with a dummy warhead, hit a target at the Kura Test Range on the Kamchatka Peninsula.

Tests conducted on 28 October 2011 and 3 November 2011, confirmed service life extension to 23 years (to 2019). More tests for extension to 25 years were announced, and on October 30, 2012, an RS-12M Topol Intercontinental Ballistic Missile was launched from the Plesetsk site in northern Russia

On 4 March 2014, Russia test fired an RS-12M Topol Intercontinental Ballistic Missile from Kapustin Yar testing ground near the Caspian Sea, successfully hitting its target at a test ground in Kazakhstan. Although the United States had received advanced notice about the test it had coincided with the annexation of Crimea.

On 20 March 2014, Russia test fired an RS-12M Topol Intercontinental Ballistic Missile from Kapustin Yar testing ground.

11 September 2016 - The Russian Strategic Missile Forces have conducted a successful test launch of a RS-12M Topol intercontinental ballistic missile, the Defense Ministry said Friday. According to the ministry, the missile, launched from the Plesetsk space center in northwestern Russia has hit a designated target on the Kamchatka peninsula "with high precision." The RS-12M Topol is a single-warhead intercontinental ballistic missile, which entered service in 1985. It has a maximum range of 10,000 km (6,125 miles) and can carry a nuclear warhead with a yield of up to 550 kilotons.

On 28 November 2019 Russian Strategic Missile Troops performed a missile test with a suborbital launch of a RS-12M Topol missile from Kapustin Yar. The test was successful.

The Topol will eventually be replaced by the road-mobile version of the Topol-M missile.

On 16 December 2023, the commander of the Strategic Missile Troops, Colonel General Sergei Karakaev, announced that with the rearmament of the last missile regiment of the Bologovsky missile formation in the Tver region from the Topol to the RS-24 Yars, the re-equipment of the mobile group of the Strategic Missile Forces was completed.

US Air Force National Air and Space Intelligence Center estimating that as of June 2017 about 100 launchers were operationally deployed.

== Variants ==
- Start-1 – a commercial space launch vehicle derived from the missile.

== Operators ==
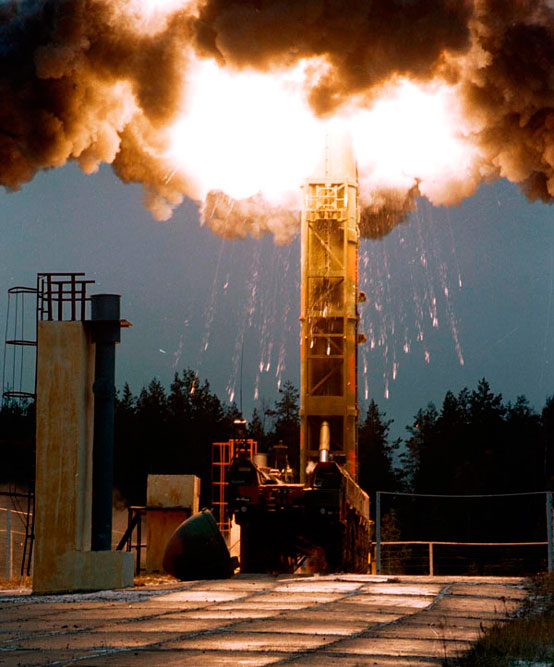
Topol missile launch

Russia

The Strategic Missile Troops were the only operator of the RT-2PM Topol. As of March 2020, 36 road-mobile RT-2PM Topol missiles were deployed with:

- 35th Rocket Division at Barnaul
- 7th Guards Rocket Division at Vypolzovo

=== Former operators ===
Soviet Union

- 39th Guards Rocket Division (Pashino, Novosibirsk Oblast)

== See also ==
- Agni-V – (India)
- DF-5 – (China)
- DF-41 – (China)
- Hwasong-18 – (North Korea)
- LGM-30 Minuteman – (United States)
- R-36 (missile) – (Soviet Union)
- RS-24 Yars – (Russia)
- RS-26 Rubezh – (Russia)
- RS-28 Sarmat – (Russia)
- RT-2PM2 Topol-M – (Russia)
- Strategic Missile Troops
- UR-100N – (Soviet Union)
