= RS-24 Yars =

- Type: Intercontinental Ballistic Missile
- Place of origin: Russia

Service history
- In service: 2010–present
- Used by: Russian Strategic Missile Troops

Production history
- Designer: Moscow Institute of Thermal Technology
- Manufacturer: Votkinsk Machine Building Plant
- Produced: 2009

Specifications
- Mass: 49,600 kg
- Length: 22,500 mm
- Diameter: 2,000 mm
- Warhead: 3 x 200 kiloton MIRV warheads
- Engine: Three-stage solid-fuel rocket
- Operational range: 11,000 km (6,800 mi) - 12,000 km (7,500 mi)
- Maximum speed: Mach 25 (30,600 km/h; 19,000 mph; 8,510 m/s)
- Guidance system: Inertial with Glonass
- Launch platform: Silo, road-mobile TEL MZKT-79221

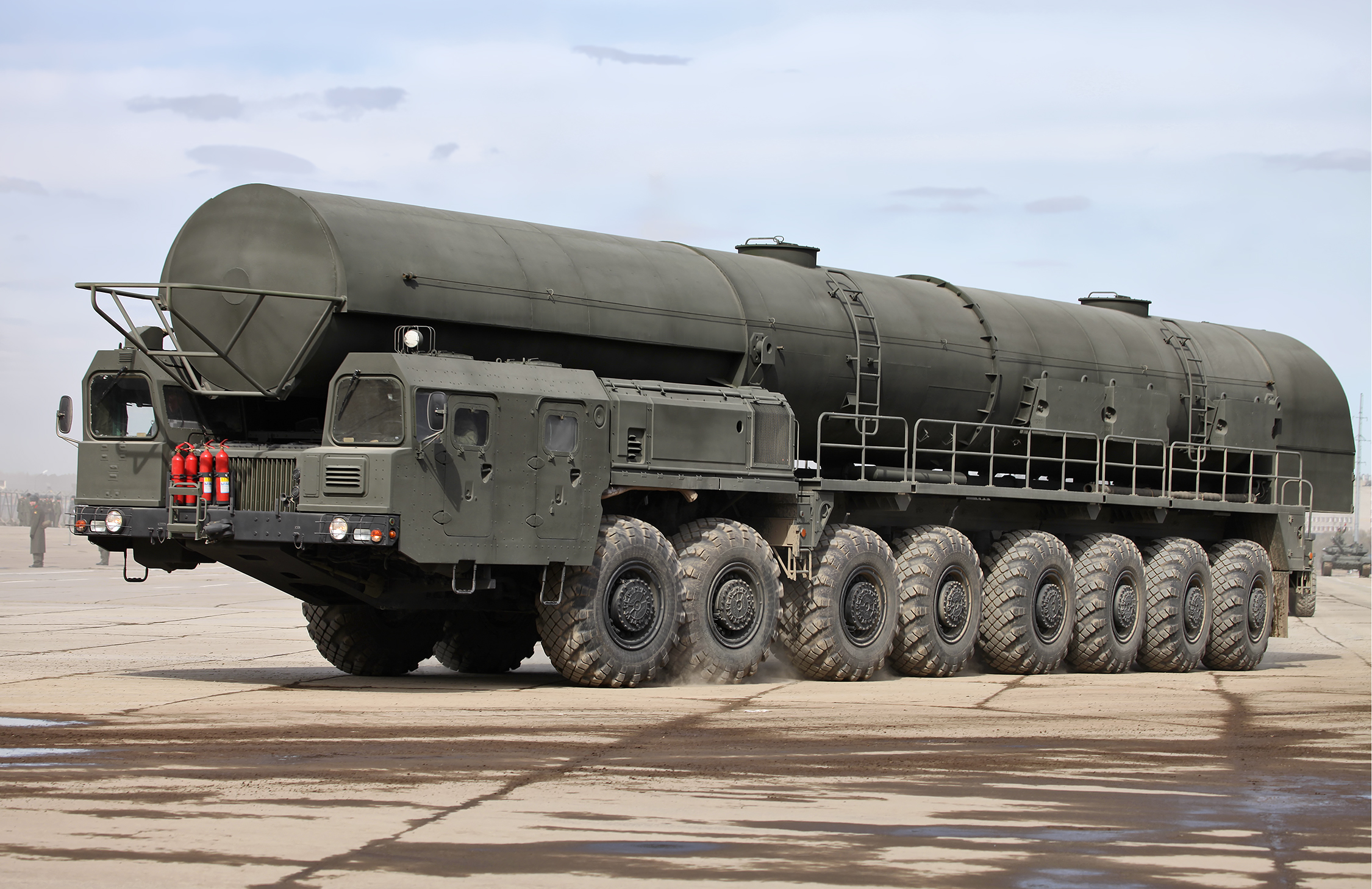
Combat support vehicle BMS used for driving school and rescue towing of the TEL

The RS-24 Yars (РС-24 Ярс – ракета стратегическая (strategic missile)-modification 24) also known as Topol-MR, NATO reporting name SS-29 or SS-27 Mod 2), is a Russian MIRV-equipped, thermonuclear armed intercontinental ballistic missile first tested on May 29, 2007, after a secret military R&D project.

It is essentially the same missile as the Topol-M except the payload “bus” has been modified to carry multiple independently targetable warheads (MIRV). Each missile is thought to be able to carry up to 4 warheads, although there is uncertainty about what is the maximum capacity.

RS-24 is a missile that is heavier than the current RT-2PM2 Topol-M, and which some reports say can carry up to 10 independently targetable warheads. The 2007 tests were publicized as a response to the missile shield that the United States were planning to deploy in Europe. The RS-24 has been deployed operationally since 2010, with more than 50 launchers operational as of June 2017.

Yars does not appear to be a Russian word but the Slavic root яр (yar) is present, being a bank or steep ravine, consistent with the nomenclature of another newly fielded Russian missile, the RS-26 Rubezh (РС-26 Рубеж) meaning a boundary or outer limit. According to Sergey Karakaev, commander of the Strategic Missile Forces, Yars is an acronym for "Yadernaya Raketa Sderzhivaniya" (Russian: Ядерная ракета сдерживания), meaning "Nuclear Deterrence Rocket".

== Testing ==
Asserted by the Russian government as being designed to defeat present and potential anti-missile systems, the ICBM was first tested by a launch from a mobile launcher at the Plesetsk Cosmodrome in northwestern Russia at 11:20 GMT, May 29, 2007, and its test warheads landed on target about 5,750 km (3,573 mi) away at the Kura Test Range in Far Eastern Kamchatka Peninsula.

The second launch from Plesetsk to the Kura Test Range was conducted on December 25, 2007, at 13:10 GMT. It successfully reached its destination. The third successful launch from the Plesetsk space center in northwest Russia was conducted on November 26, 2008, at 13:20 GMT. The missile's multiple re-entry vehicles successfully landed on targets on the Kura testing range.

It was again tested on December 24, 2013, from the Plesetsk Cosmodrome in northwest Russia. On December 26, 2014, the Strategic Forces conducted a successful launch of an RS-24 Yars missile. The missile was launched from a mobile launcher deployed at the Plesetsk test site. Missile warheads were reported to have successfully reached their targets at the Kura test site in Kamchatka. The launch, which was performed with support of the Air and Space Defense Forces, took place at 11:02 MSK (08:02 UTC). More than 10 successful launches took place between 2012 and 2022. One more launch was conducted on October 25, 2023.

On March 1 and October 29, 2024, October 22, 2025, May 21 and August 28, 2026, the Russian Defense Ministry said it conducted successful combat training launches of RS-24 Yars ICBMs from Plesetsk Cosmodrome in Arkhangelsk.

== Deployment ==
In June 2008, the chief designer of the Moscow Institute of Thermal Technology, Yuri Solomonov, announced that the RS-24 is an enhanced, MIRVed development of the Topol-M missile that would finish all testing in 2008 and most likely be deployed in 2009.

According to the Russian rocket forces the first six RS-24 missiles will be mobile.

Further on October 10, 2009, on ITAR-TASS, General Andrei Shvaichenko, the new SRF commander, confirmed the December 2009 deployment of the RS-24 which will support the existing RT-2PM2 Topol-M (RS-12М2) missile complex.

Testing for the new-generation ICBM was completed in mid-July 2010, and the first missiles were deployed shortly after on July 19.

In December 2010 the 54th Guards Rocket Division in Teykovo received its second delivery of RS-24 missile systems. In total 6 missiles were deployed by the end of 2010. 3 more mobile missile systems were deployed in July 2011 and then the first regiment was operational. In December 2011 first division of second regiment with 3 missiles was put on combat duty and second division will be deployed by 2011 year-end. On August 16, 2012, Strategic Missile Forces (SMF) spokesman Col. Vadim Koval reported that a second regiment of the 54th Guards Rocket Division in Teikovo, central Russia will be fully equipped with Yars mobile ballistic missile systems in 2012.

Russia fully deployed the first Yars regiment consisting of three battalions in August 2011, and put two battalions of the second regiment on combat duty on December 27, 2011. The deployment of the third battalion of the second regiment completed the rearming of the Teikovo division with Yars systems. The two regiments consist of a total of 18 missile systems and several mobile command posts. Two more missile divisions will start receiving the Yars systems in 2013.

The 39th Guards Rocket Division, at Paskino, Novosibirsk Oblast, in Siberia, will receive mobile Yars systems, while the 28th Guards Rocket Division at Kozelsk (in central Russia) will be armed with the silo-based version of the system.

Three missile regiments of the Russian Strategic Missile Forces have been rearmed with the Yars systems in 2014.

On 18 October 2019, Col. Alexander Prokopenkov, commander of the 35th Rocket Division, stated that the new "Yars-S" missile systems will enter combat duty in the city of Barnaul in November. Technical characteristics of the new missile system have not been disclosed. Previously, "Yars-S" have entered combat duty in Yoshkar-Ola. Until 2021, three more regiments of the Strategic Missile Forces will be rearmed with the modernized complex.

According to Sergey Karakaev, commander of the Strategic Missile Forces, as of November 2019, there were "more than 150" launchers of the "Yars" complex (silo and mobile-based) in operation. Regiments in Yoshkar-Ola, Teykovo, Nizhny Tagil and Novosibirsk have been fully rearmed with the TEL version of "Yars" and rearmament of the Irkutsk missile regiments is to be complete until the end of 2019. According to Karakaev, RVSN receives "around 20" "Yars" complexes per year. 3 missile regiments in Barnaul begun combat duty in 2019-2020 and one more in Tver region in 2022.

On 29 March 2023, the Yars missile was exercised simultaneously in three regions.

== Controversies ==
The US National Air and Space Intelligence Center NASIC always believed that Yars was just a Topol M in violation of the New START Treaty, something that is reflected in both the Mod 2 designation and the illustrations showing the SS-27 Mod 1 and Mod 2 to be identical.

== Variants ==
=== Road-mobile version ===
- Yars-S: The modernized and scaled-down version of the road-mobile "Yars".

=== Rail version ===
- Barguzin: A railcar launched version is being developed, called BZhRK Barguzin.

== Operators ==
Russia

The Strategic Missile Troops are the only operator of the RS-24 Yars. As of late 2025, 180 road-mobile and 30+ silo-based RS-24 missiles are deployed.

== See also ==
- Strategic Missile Troops
- DF-41 – (China)
- Hwasong-18 – (North Korea)
- LGM-30 Minuteman – (United States)
- R-36 (missile) – (Soviet Union)
- RS-26 Rubezh – (Russia)
- RS-28 Sarmat – (Russia)
- RT-2PM Topol – (Soviet Union)
- RT-2PM2 Topol-M – (Russia)
- UR-100N – (Soviet Union)
