= RT-2PM2 Topol-M =

Russian ICBM

Topol-M SS-27 "Sickle B"
- Topol-M being launched.
- Type: Intercontinental ballistic missile
- Place of origin: Russia

Service history
- In service: December 2000–present
- Used by: Russian Strategic Rocket Forces

Production history
- Designer: Moscow Institute of Thermal Technology
- Manufacturer: Votkinsk Machine Building Plant
- Produced: December 1994–2010

Specifications
- Mass: 47,200 kg (104,000 lb)
- Length: 22.7 m (74 ft)
- Diameter: 1.93 m (6 ft 4 in)
- Warhead: 1 x 1.0 Mt
- Engine: Three-stage solid-fuel rocket
- Operational range: 11,000 km (6,800 mi)
- Maximum speed: 7,520 metres per second (27,100 km/h; 16,800 mph; Mach 22)
- Guidance system: Inertial with GLONASS
- Accuracy: 200 m CEP
- Launch platform: Silo, road-mobile TEL

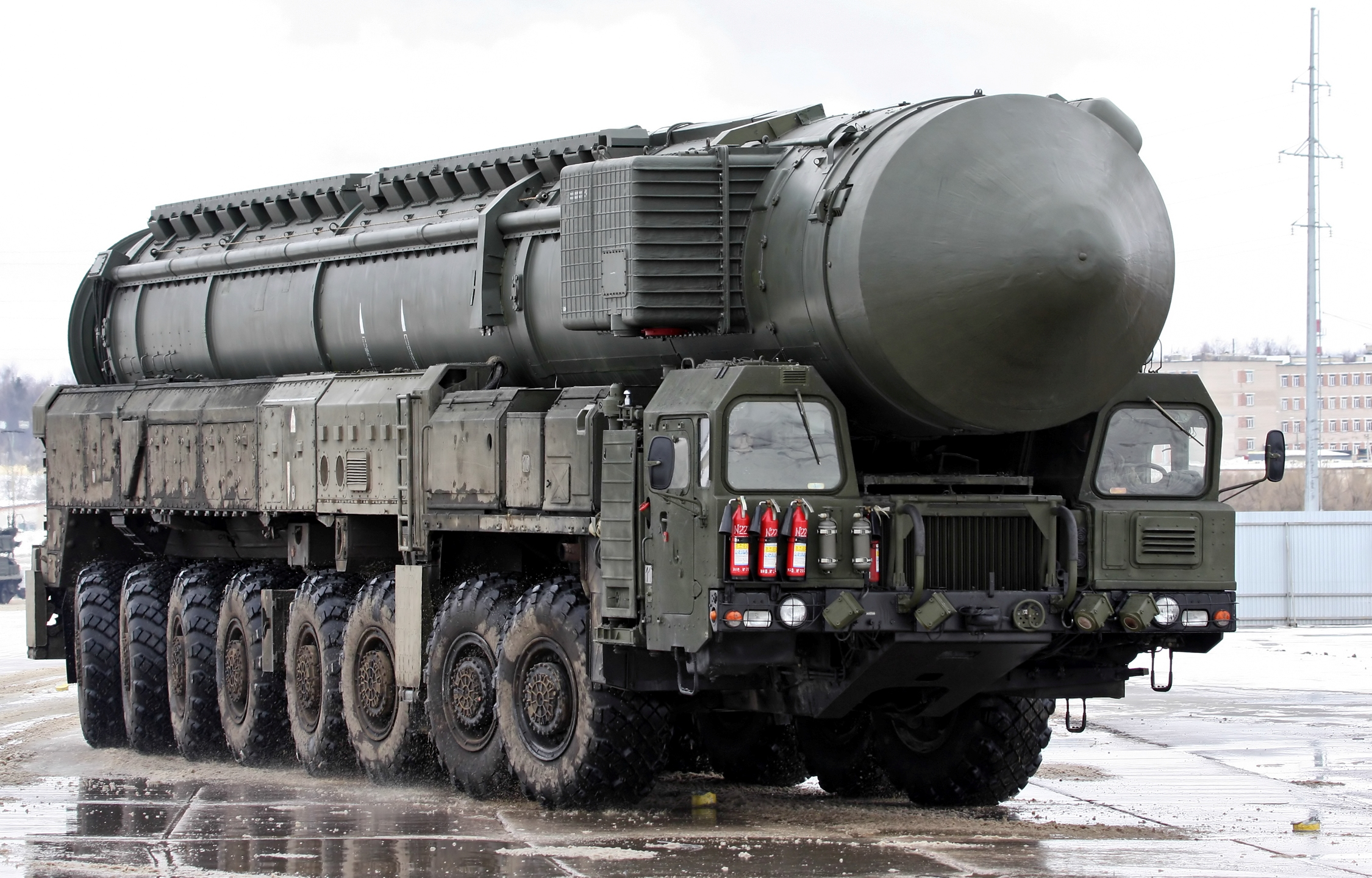
MZKT-79221 Transporter erector launcher carrying missile container during rehearsals for the 2012 Moscow Victory Day Parade.

The RT-2PM2 Topol-M (Russian: РТ-2ПМ2 «Тополь-М», NATO reporting name: SS-27 "Sickle B", other designations: SS-27 Mod 1, RS-12M1, RS-12M2, formerly incorrectly RT-2UTTKh) is one of the most recent intercontinental ballistic missiles to be deployed by Russia, and the first to be developed after the dissolution of the Soviet Union. It was developed from the RT-2PM Topol mobile intercontinental ballistic missile.

In its Russian designation РТ stands for "ракета твердотопливная", raketa tverdotoplivnaya ("solid fuel rocket"), while УТТХ – for "улучшенные тактико-технические характеристики", uluchshenniye taktiko-tekhnicheskie kharakteristiki ("improved tactical and technical characteristics"). "Topol" (тополь) in Russian means "white poplar". It is designed and produced exclusively by the Moscow Institute of Thermal Technology, and built at the Votkinsk Machine Building Plant.

== Characteristics ==
The Topol-M is a cold-launched, three-stage, solid-propellant, silo-based or road-mobile intercontinental ballistic missile. The missile's length is 22.7 meters and the first stage has a body diameter of 1.9 meters. The mass at launch is 47,200 kg, including the 1,200 kg payload. Topol-M carries a single warhead with an 800 kiloton yield but the design is compatible with MIRV warheads. According to chief designer Yury Solomonov, the missile can carry four to six warheads along with decoys. It is claimed to have the highest accuracy of any Russian ICBM. The body of the rocket is made by winding carbon fiber.

The Topol-M may be deployed either inside a reinforced missile silo or from an APU launcher mounted on the MZKT-79221 "Universal" 16-wheeled transporter-erector-launcher. The designation for the silo-based Topol-M missile is believed to be RS-12M2, while the mobile version is RS-12M1.

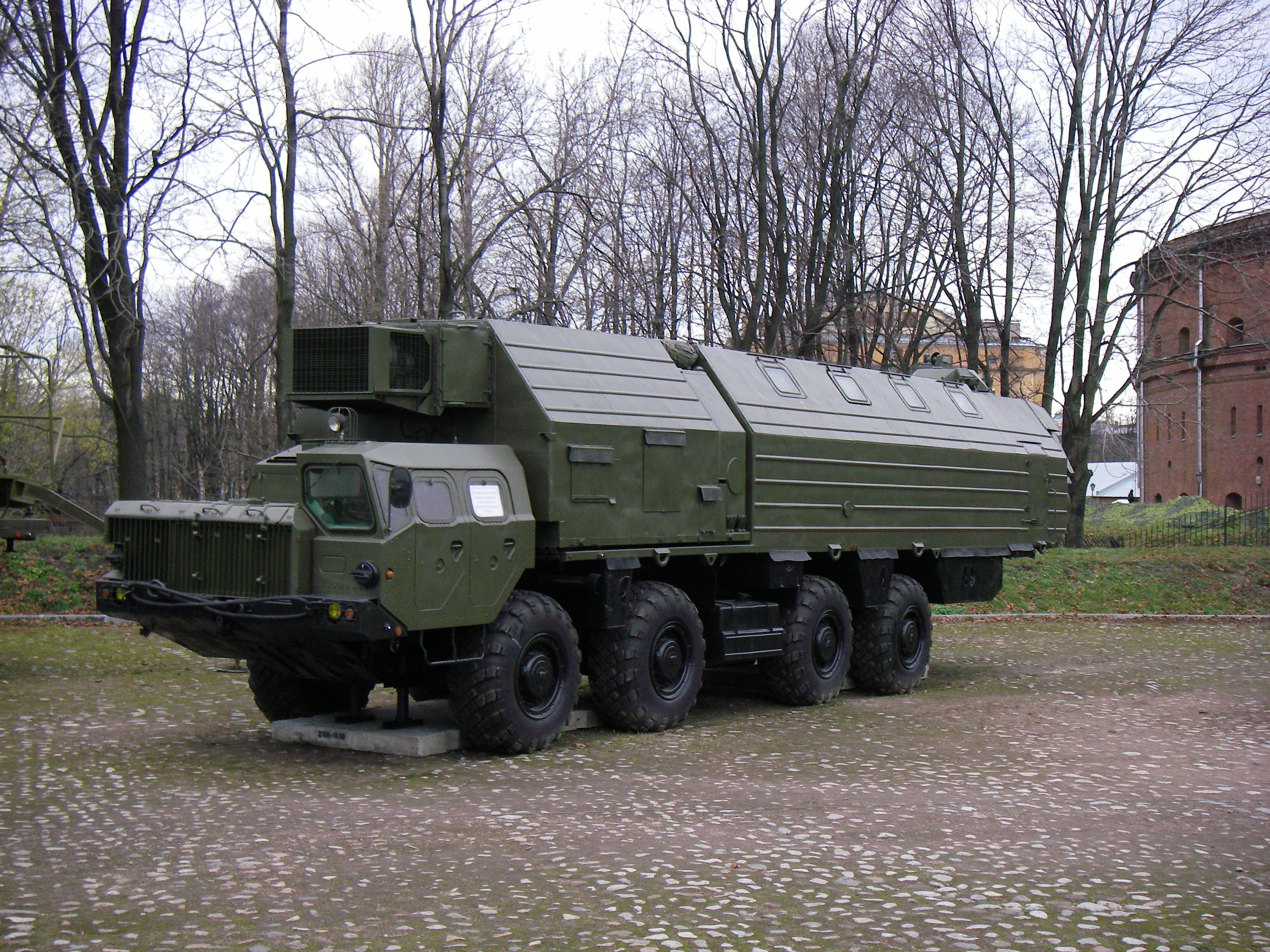
Combat Support Vehicle (MOBD) 15V231 of Topol/Topol-M at the Saint-Petersburg Artillery Museum

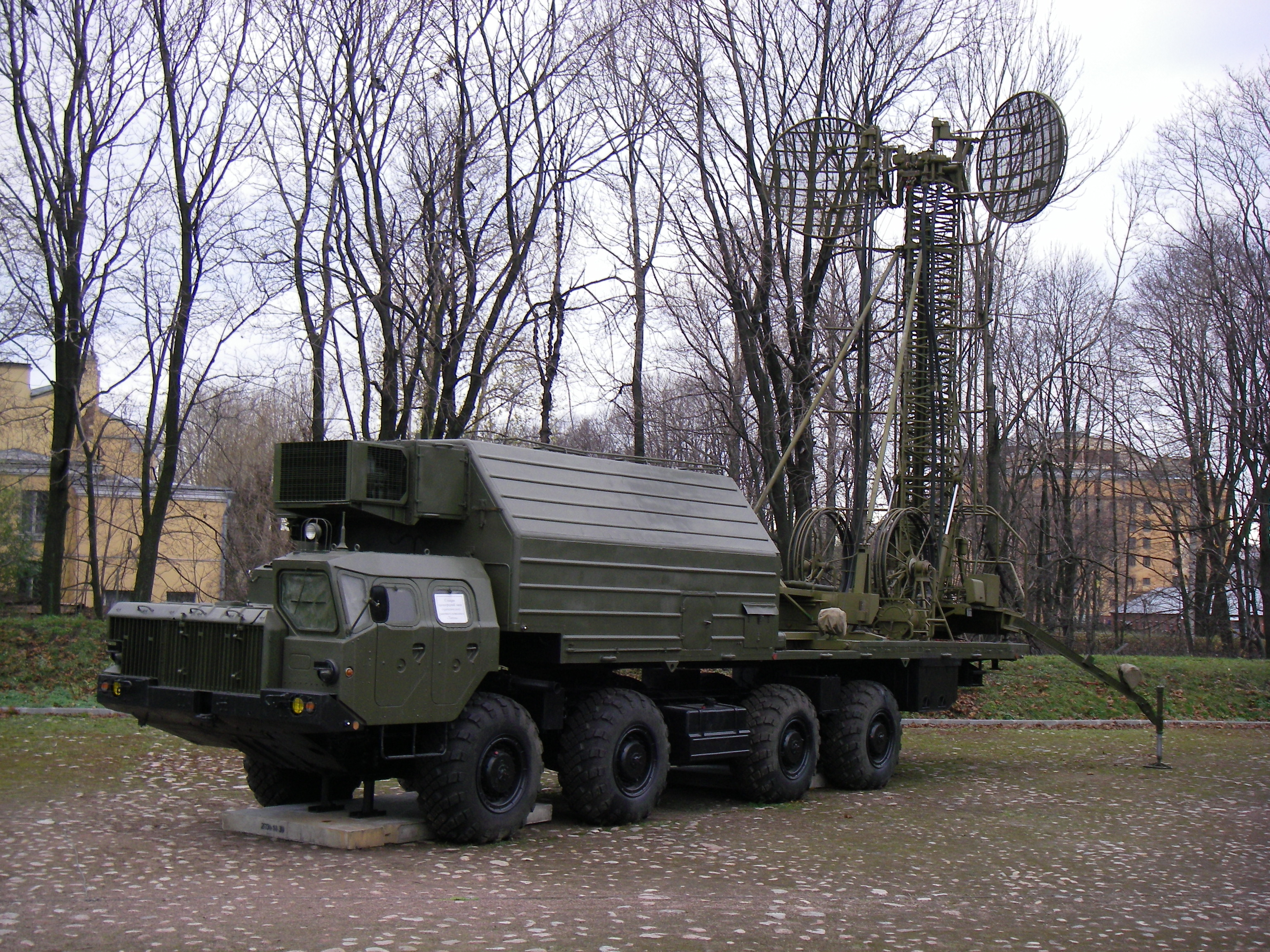
Troposphere Relay Station R-406VCh of Topol/Topol-M at the Saint-Petersburg Artillery Museum

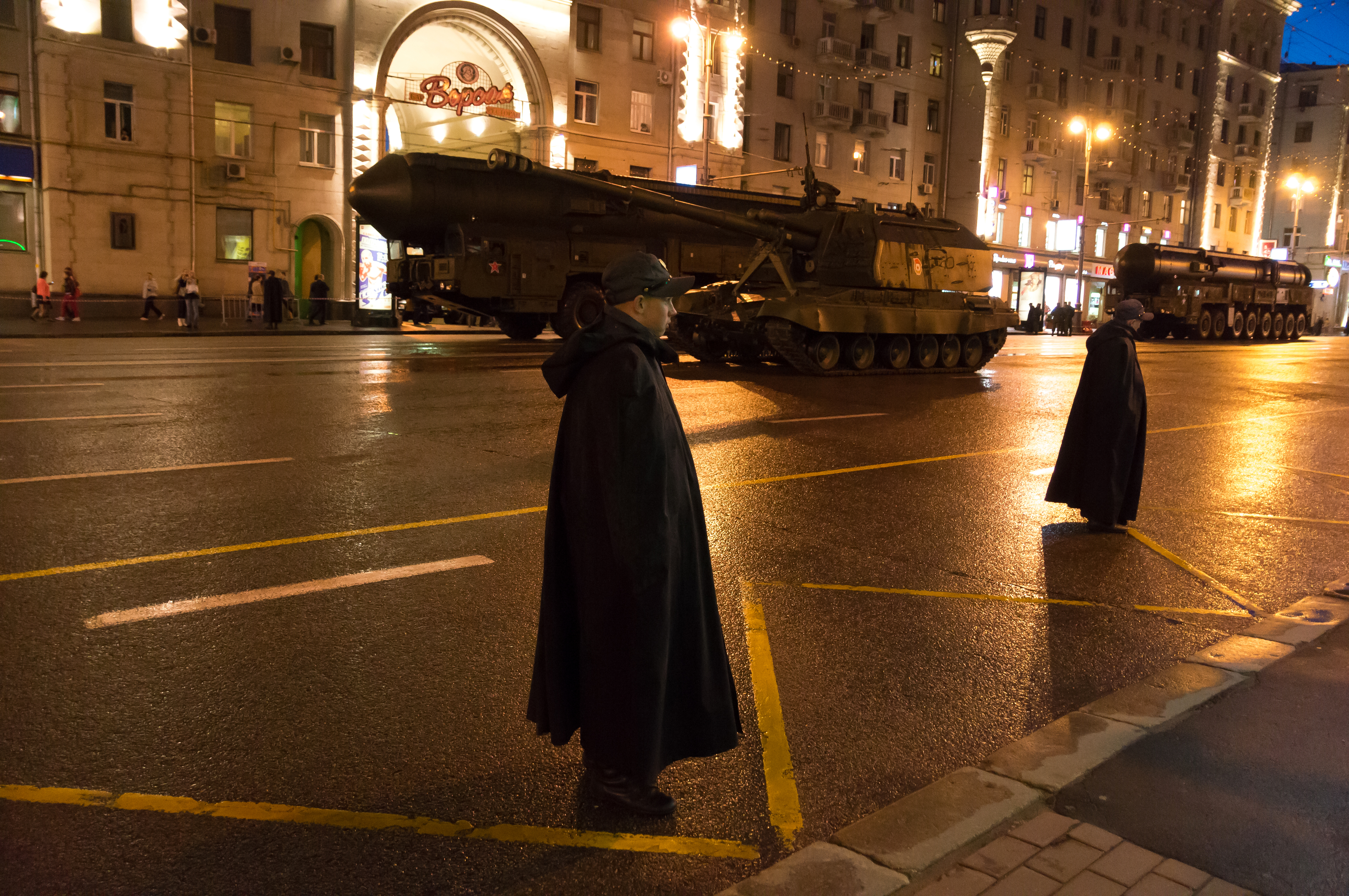
Topol-M mobile launchers on the streets of Moscow during Victory Day Parade Rehearsal

The first stage has rocket motors developed by the Soyuz Federal Center for Dual-Use Technologies. These give the missile a much higher acceleration than other ICBM types. They enable the missile to accelerate to the speed of 7,320 m/s and to travel a flatter trajectory to distances of up to 10,000 km.

As a solid propellant design, the missile can be maintained on alert for prolonged periods of time and can launch within minutes of being given the order.

== Development and deployment ==
The development of the missile began in the late 1980s as a response to the American Strategic Defense Initiative. Initially an evolutionary upgrade of the RT-2PM Topol, the missile was redesigned in 1992. The missile's principal designer was Yuri Solomonov, who would later oversee the development of the RSM-56 Bulava.

The first flight test took place on December 20, 1994, during which the missile, launched from Plesetsk, hit its target 6,400 kilometres (4,000 mi) away. Two missiles were put on experimental combat duty in December 1997 at Tatishchevo. The fifth test flight on 22 October 1998 was unsuccessful as the missile exploded after being launched; the sixth test flight two months later was successful. The 104th Regiment of the Taman Missile Division, based in Saratov, introduced 10 missiles into service on 30 December 1998; another ten entered service with a second regiment in December 1999.

Silo launcher Topol-M entered service by presidential decree on 13 July 2000, the third, fourth and fifth regiments entered service in 2000, 2003, and 2005. The last regiment was to arrive in 2012.

On December 12, 2006, the first three mobile Topol-M missile systems entered duty with a missile unit stationed near the town of Teykovo.

Current Strategic Rocket Forces Order of Battle lists the following sites with Topol-M missiles:

- 27th Guards Rocket Army (HQ: Vladimir)
  - 60th Missile Division at Tatishchevo with 60 silo-based Topol-M
  - 54th Guards Missile Division at Teykovo with 18 mobile Topol-M

The Topol-M missiles have a lifetime between 15 and 20 years.

== Missile defense evasion capabilities ==
According to Russia this missile and its derivatives, RS-24 Yars, RS-26 Rubezh and RSM-56 Bulava are designed to counter and evade current or planned United States missile defense system. It is said to be capable of making evasive maneuvers to avoid a kill by interceptors, and carries targeting countermeasures and decoys.

One of the Topol-M's most notable features is its short engine burn time following take-off, intended to minimize satellite detection of launches and thereby complicate both early warning and interception by missile defense systems during boost phase. The missile also has a relatively flat ballistic trajectory, complicating defense acquisition and interception.

According to The Washington Times, Russia has conducted a successful test of the evasive payload delivery system. The missile was launched on 1 November 2005 from the Kapustin Yar facility. The warhead changed course after separating from the launcher, making it difficult to predict a re-entry trajectory.

== Equipment of Topol-M with MIRV ==
A new missile loosely based on Topol-M and equipped with multiple re-entry vehicles (MIRV) is called RS-24 Yars. In January 2009 Russian sources hinted that the production of the mobile Topol-M missile would be shutting down in 2009 and that the new MIRVed RS-24 version would replace it.

== Operators ==
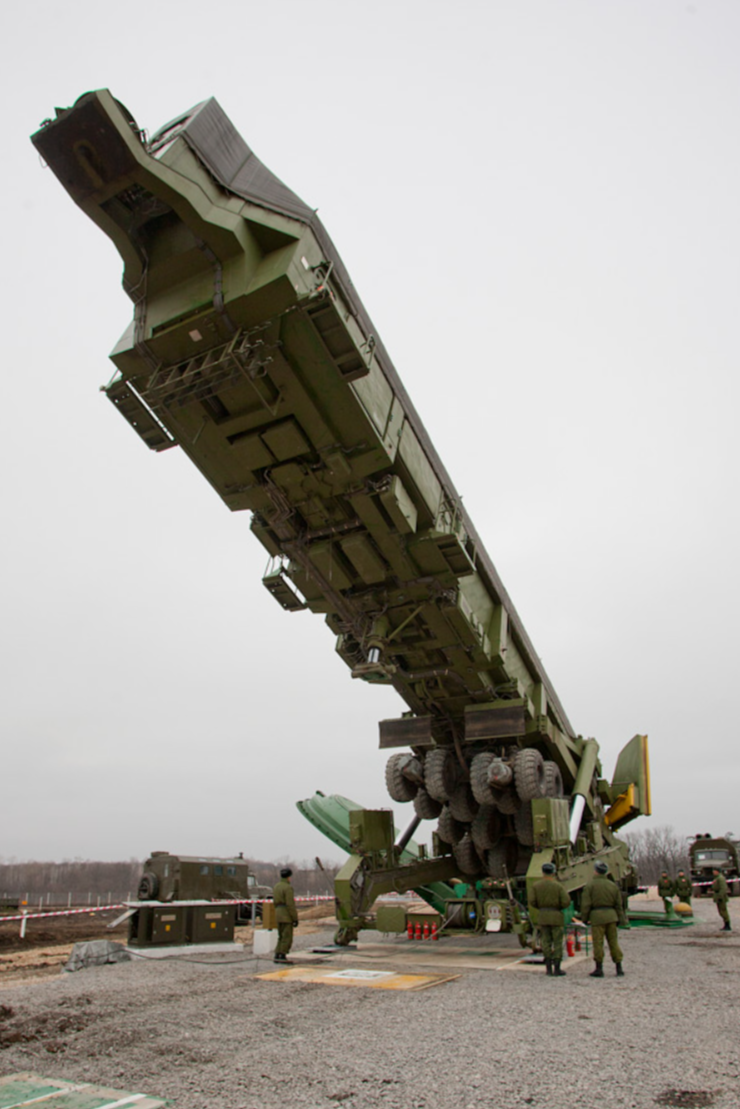
Loading ICBM Topol-M into the launch silo

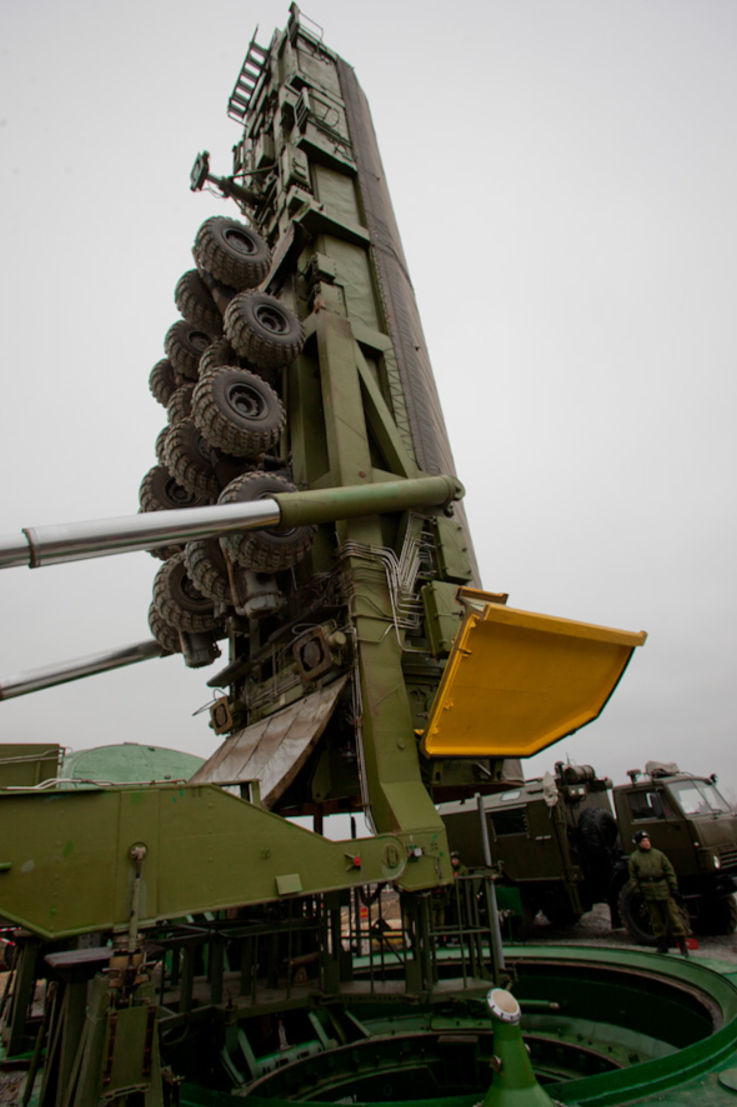
The final stage of loading the rocket into the launch silo

Russia

The Strategic Missile Troops are the only operator of the RT-2PM2 Topol-M. As of March 2020, 60 silo-based and 18 mobile RT-2PM2 Topol-M missiles are deployed with 2 rocket divisions:

Silo-based:

- 60th Rocket Division at Tatishchevo Air Base

Road-mobile:

- 54th Guards Rocket Division at Teykovo

It is believed that since 2010 no more RT-2PM2 Topol-M missiles have been purchased in favor of the newest RS-24 Yars.

== See also ==
- Agni-V – (India)
- DF-5 – (China)
- DF-31 – (China)
- DF-41 – (China)
- Hwasong-18 – (North Korea)
- Hwasong-19 – (North Korea)
- LGM-30 Minuteman – (United States)
- R-36 (missile) – (Soviet Union)
- RS-24 Yars – (Russia)
- RS-26 Rubezh – (Russia)
- RS-28 Sarmat – (Russia)
- RT-2PM Topol – (Soviet Union)
- Strategic Rocket Forces
- UR-100N – (Soviet Union)
