= 1st Guards Breakthrough Artillery Division =

- Active: March 1943 – 1960
- Country: Soviet Union
- Branch: Red Army
- Type: Artillery
- Size: Division
- Engagements: World War II
- Decorations: Order of Lenin; Order of the Red Banner; Order of Suvorov, 2nd class; Order of Kutuzov, 2nd class; Order of Bogdan Khmelnitsky, 2nd class
- Battle honours: Glukhov

Commanders
- Notable commanders: Grigory Godin; Ivan Kupin

The 1st Guards Glukhov Order of Lenin, Red Banner, Orders of Suvorov, Kutuzov, and Bogdan Khmelnitsky Breakthrough Artillery Division was the formal name of the 1st Guards Breakthrough Artillery Division (Russian: 1-я гвардейская артиллерийская дивизия прорыва), a division of the Red Army (the Soviet Army from 1946) that existed during World War II and the early period of the Cold War. The division was formed under the reorganisation of the Soviet artillery forces in 1943, becoming an active heavy artillery formation during the Second World War. However, following cuts to the army in the later 50s, the division was disbanded.

== History ==
The division was formed as the 1st Artillery Division of the Reserve of the Supreme High Command (RGK) in October 1942 with the Southwestern Front, under the command of Colonel Vikenty Mazur. It was composed of the 274th, 275th, and 331st Howitzer, the 1162nd and 1166th Gun, and the 468th, 501st, and 1189th Tank Destroyer Artillery Regiments. In addition to its regiments, the division included the organic 816th Separate Reconnaissance Artillery Battalion and the 45th Separate Corrective Aviation Squadron. It was sent into combat on 9 November 1942 in the area of Kletskaya and Serafimovich, supporting the 21st Army of the Southwestern Front in the final stage of the Soviet defensive phase of the Battle of Stalingrad. From the second half of November to January 1943, the units of the 1st Artillery, operationally subordinated to the 24th and 65th Armies of the Don Front, provided artillery support in the encirclement and defeat of the German troops in the Stalingrad area.

After the Battle of Stalingrad, the 1st Artillery was transferred to the Central Front during February, where it was subordinated to the 65th Army and later the 70th Army. The division was reorganized on 20 February 1943, with its regiments combined into three brigades – one howitzer, one gun, and one tank destroyer. In recognition of its "courage and heroism", the division was converted into the 1st Guards Artillery Division RGK on 1 March; Mazur received a simultaneous promotion to major general. The 1st Guards Artillery Division included the 1st Guards Gun, 2nd Guards Howitzer, and 1st Guards Light Artillery Brigades, which in turn included the 201st and 205th Guards Gun, 169th and 203rd Guards Howitzer, and 167th, 200th, and 206th Guards Light Artillery Regiments. In May 1943 Mazur was promoted to artillery corps command and replaced by Colonel Grigory Godin, who would be promoted to major general on 7 August. During the defensive phase of the Battle of Kursk, the division supported the 13th and 70th Armies with massed artillery fire, helping to repulse German tank and infantry attacks.

It received the Glukhov honorific title on 31 August. In October the division was assigned to the First Ukrainian Front. In July 1944 the division was assigned to the 7th Artillery Corps.

From 16 April to 20 May 1944 3rd Guards Light Artillery Brigade commander Colonel Viktor Zhagala temporarily commanded the division after Arkady Volchek was wounded. 76th Rifle Corps Artillery commander Colonel Viktor Khusid (promoted to major general on 18 November 1944) was appointed to lead the division on 21 May, while it was part of the 1st Ukrainian Front. The division then fought in the Lvov–Sandomierz Offensive. The division was redesignated as the 1st Guards Breakthrough Artillery Division in November 1944, reflecting its role of providing artillery concentrations for offensives. In 1945 the division fought in the Sandomierz–Silesian Offensive, the Lower Silesian Offensive, the Berlin Offensive, and the Prague Offensive, and in fighting for the cities of Szydłów, Kielce, Steinau, Lüben, Sprottau, Cottbus, and Dresden.

Postwar, the division became part of the Central Group of Forces and in April 1947 was withdrawn to the Carpathian Military District. In August of that year, Khusid was transferred to the artillery reserve. Until its disbandment in 1960, the division was stationed in Nestorov in the Carpathian Military District. Its lineage is inherited by the 39th Guards Rocket Division of the 33rd Guards Rocket Army, part of the Russian Strategic Missile Troops. The 39th Guards Rocket Division was established on 18 July 1960 in Pashino (Gvardeyskiy), Novosibirsk Oblast, as the 212th Guards Svir Orders of Kutuzov and Bogdan Khmelnitsky Rocket Brigade, from the 21st Heavy Howitzer Artillery Brigade.

== Commanders ==
The following officers are known to have commanded the division:

- Colonel Vikenty Mazur (promoted to major general 1 March 1943; October 1942 – May 1943)
- Colonel Grigory Godin (promoted to major general 7 August 1943; May – September 1943)
- Colonel Arkady Volchek (promoted to major general 28 September 1943; September 1943 – April 1944)
- Colonel Viktor Zhagala (acting; 16 April–20 May 1944)
- Colonel Viktor Khusid (promoted to major general 18 November 1944; 21 May 1944 – August 1947)
- Dmitry Parovatkin
- Ivan Kupin

== Organization in 1943 ==
Structure of the division when it was formed from the 1st Artillery Division in 1943:

- Divisional Headquarters
- Artillery Observation Battalion
- Truck Transportation Battalion
- Artillery and Automotive Maintenance Group [battalion]
- Medical Company
- 3rd Guards Light Artillery Brigade
  - 167th Guards Light Artillery Regiment (armed with M1942 ZiS-3 76mm divisional guns)
  - 200th Guards Light Artillery Regiment (armed with M1942 ZiS-3 76mm divisional guns)
  - 206th Guards Light Artillery Regiment (armed with M1942 ZiS-3 76mm divisional guns)
- 1st Guards Cannon Brigade
  - 201st Guards Cannon Regiment
  - 205th Guards Cannon Regiment
- 3rd Guards Howitzer Brigade
  - 169th Guards Howitzer Regiment (armed with M1938 M-30 122mm howitzers)
  - 203rd Guards Howitzer Regiment (armed with M1938 M-30 122mm howitzers)
  - 399th Guards Howitzer Regiment (armed with M1938 M-30 122mm howitzers)

== Organization in 1945 ==
Structure of the division between 1943 and 1945:

- Divisional Headquarters
- 14th Guards Separate Reconnaissance Artillery Battalion (before 29 November 1944)
- 30th Mortar Brigade (added December 1944)
- 19th Guards Mortar Brigade (added December 1944)
- 16th Heavy Mortar Brigade (added December 1944)
- 3rd Guards Light Artillery Brigade
- 1st Guards Cannon Brigade
- 3rd Guards Howitzer Brigade
- 98th Heavy Howitzer Brigade (added November 1944)
- 870th Auto Transport Battalion
- 494th Field Auto Repair Base (from 15 May 1944)
- 101st Field Artillery Repair Shop (from 5 July 1943)
- 528th Medical and Sanitation Company
- 494th Field Bakery
- 1726th Field Post Office
- 1786th Field Cash Office of the State Bank
