= Aleysk (air base) =

Aleysk
- Aleysk, Altai Krai in Russia

Site information
- Type: Air Base
- Owner: Ministry of Defence
- Operator: Russian Air Force
- Condition: Now training range

Location
- Shown within Altai Krai, Russia Aleysk (Russia)
- Coordinates: 52°29′0″N 82°42′0″E

Site history
- In use: Unknown - 2001

Airfield information
- Identifiers: ICAO: XNBJ
- Elevation: 206 metres (676 ft) AMSL
Runways
Direction	Length and surface
00/00	2,000 metres (6,562 ft) Concrete

Aleysk was an air base in Altai Krai, Russia located 6 km west of Aleysk. It comprises the remains of a small airfield, razed during the 1990s to make way for a military training range.

== Station history ==
The Aleysk area was once the home to a division of the Strategic Rocket Forces, the 41st Guards Lvovsko-Berlinskaya orders of Kutuzov and Bogdan Khmelnitskiy Missile Division. There were 30 silos for RS-20/SS-18 'Satan' ICBMs in the area, but from late 2000 through 2002, the silos were destroyed in accordance with US/Soviet arms reduction treaties. The process was managed by US Government contractors under the Nunn-Lugar Cooperative Threat Reduction program and observed/verified by United States Air Force representatives according to START I elimination requirements. The final regiment went off duty on 31 August 2001, and the Division was disbanded on 1 December 2001.

The SRF's Aleysk military garrison area, which included housing, a school, three kindergartens, a swimming pool, and a large amount of other equipment, was transferred to the 122nd Guards Motor Rifle Division of the Siberian Military District's Ground Forces by 2005.

The 122nd Guards Motor Rifle Division became the 35th Separate Guards Motor Rifle Brigade in June 2009. In early 2022 it entered combat as part of the 2022 Russian invasion of Ukraine.

== See also ==
- List of military airbases in Russia
