= Commander of the Strategic Rocket Forces =

- Командующий Ракетными войсками стратегического назначения
- Flag of the Commander of the RVSN

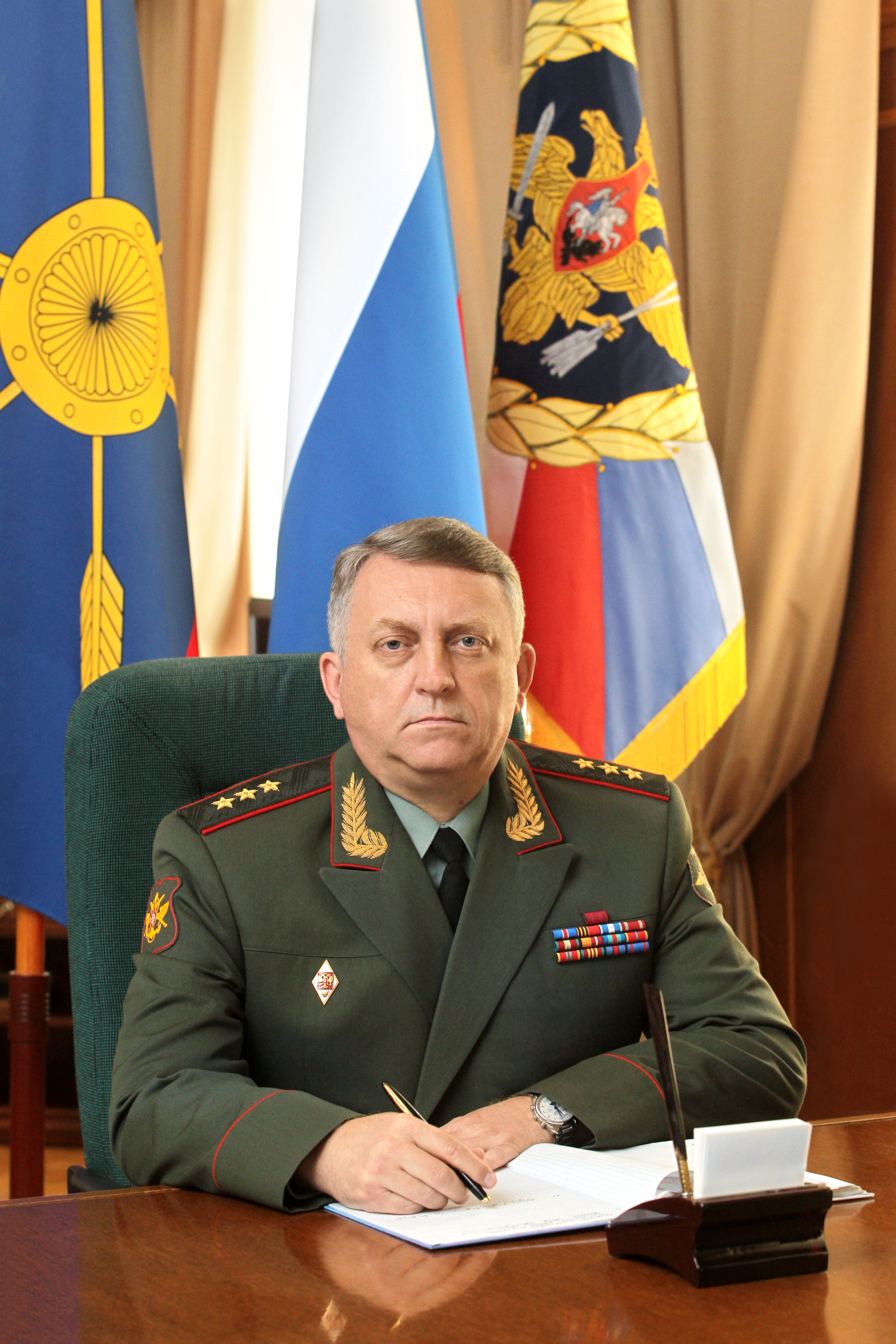
- Incumbent; Colonel General Sergey Karakayev since 22 June 2010
- Strategic Rocket Forces; Strategic Rocket Forces Command
- Member of: General Staff of the Armed Forces
- Reports to: Chief of the General Staff
- Appointer: President of Russia
- Formation: 17 December 1959 (historic); 26 August 1992 (current form)

The Commander of the Strategic Rocket Forces (Russian: Командующий Ракетными войсками стратегического назначения) is the general officer responsible for leading the Strategic Rocket Forces of the Russian Armed Forces.

== History ==
In the years after World War II the development of Soviet ballistic missiles was the responsibility of a department with in the Chief Artillery Directorate of the Ministry of Defense, which was the basis for creation of the Strategic Rocket Forces (RVSN) as a separate branch of the Soviet Armed Forces, on 17 December 1959. The branch was given control over all of the Soviet Union's ballistic missiles.

The title of the head of the service was changed in 2001 from commander-in-chief to commander, when the Russian Space Forces were split off from the RVSN as a separate combat arm. The Main Staff of the Rocket Forces became the Staff.

== List of commanders ==
=== Commanders-in-Chief ===
No.	Portrait	Commander-in-chief	Took office	Left office	Time in office	Reference
1	Mitrofan Nedelin	Chief Marshal of Artillery; Mitrofan Nedelin (1902–1960)	17 December 1959	24 October 1960	312 days	
2	Kirill Moskalenko	Marshal of the Soviet Union; Kirill Moskalenko (1902–1985)	25 October 1960	April 1962	~1 year, 158 days	
3	Sergey Biryuzov	Marshal of the Soviet Union; Sergey Biryuzov (1904–1964)	April 1962	March 1963	~334 days	
4	Nikolai Krylov	Marshal of the Soviet Union; Nikolai Krylov (1903–1972)	March 1963	9 February 1972	~8 years, 345 days	
5	Vladimir Tolubko	Chief Marshal of Artillery; Vladimir Tolubko (1914–1989)	10 February 1972	10 July 1985	13 years, 150 days	
6	Yuri Maksimov	General of the Army; Yuri Maksimov (1924–2002)	10 July 1985	26 August 1992	7 years, 47 days	
7	Igor Sergeyev	General of the Army; Igor Sergeyev (1938–2006)	26 August 1992	22 May 1997	4 years, 269 days	
8	Vladimir Yakovlev	General of the Army; Vladimir Yakovlev (born 1954)	30 June 1997	26 April 2001	3 years, 339 days	

=== Commanders ===
No.	Portrait	Commander-in-chief	Took office	Left office	Time in office	Reference
9	Nikolai Solovtsov	Colonel General; Nikolai Solovtsov (born 1949)	26 April 2001	3 August 2009	8 years, 99 days	
10	Andrey Shvaichenko	Lieutenant General; Andrey Shvaichenko (born 1953)	3 August 2009	22 June 2010	323 days	
11	Sergey Karakayev	Colonel General; Sergey Karakayev (born 1961)	22 June 2010		16 years, 77 days	

== Deputies and chiefs of staff ==
First Deputy Commander-in-Chief

- Vladimir Tolubko (1960–1968)
- Mikhail Grigoryev (1968–1981)
- Yuri Yashin (1981–1989)
- Aleksandr Volkov (1989–1994)
- Nikolai Solovtsov (1994–1997)

Chief of the Main Staff

- Mikhail Nikolsky (1960–1962)
- Mikhail Lovkov (1962–1966)
- Vladimir Vishenkov (1976–1987)
- Stanislav Kochemasov (1987–1994)
- Viktor Yesin (1994–1997)
- Vladimir Yakovlev (1996–1997)

Chief of the Main Staff and First Deputy Commander-in-Chief

- Anatoly Perminov (1997–2001)

Chief of Staff and First Deputy Commander

- Sergey Khutortsev (2001–2006)
- Andrey Shvaichenko (2006–2009)
- Sergey Karakayev (2009–2010)
- ?

== Sources ==
- Siddiqi, Asif A. (2000). Challenge to Apollo: The Soviet Union and the Space Race, 1945–1974. Washington, DC: NASA History Division.
