= Viktor Mikhailov =

Soviet and Russian military-political officer (1924–2021)

- Native name: Виктор Михайлович Михайлов
- Born: 22 June 1924; Shikhazany, Tsivilsky Uyezd, Chuvash Autonomous Oblast, Russian SFSR, Soviet Union
- Died: 27 September 2021 (aged 97)
- Allegiance: Soviet Union
- Branch: Military-Political; Strategic Rocket Forces
- Rank: Major General
- Awards: Order of Honour; Medal of Zhukov; Order of the Patriotic War, 1st Class; Order of the Red Banner of Labour; Orders of the Red Star (4); Order "For Service to the Homeland in the Armed Forces of the USSR", 3rd Class; Order of the Badge of Honour; Medal "For Battle Merit"

Viktor Mikhailovich Mikhailov (Russian: Виктор Михайлович Михайлов; 22 June 1924 – 27 September 2021) was a Soviet and Russian military-political officer. He served during the Second World War and after, rising to the rank of major general and serving as head of the Riga Higher Military Political School from 1977 to 1987.

Born into a peasant family in 1924, Mikhailov turned 17 the day of the Nazi invasion of the Soviet Union in 1941. Initially refused entering military service due to his age, he was then enlisted, and sent to serve on reconnaissance missions during the Battle of Moscow as part of a ski battalion. He saw action on a number of occasions, and was wounded. After his recovery he was appointed commander of a 45-mm anti-tank gun, and sent to the North Caucasus. He fought in the Battle of the Caucasus and the recapture of the Taman Peninsula, being decorated for his service. Wounded again in action, he returned to service as a political officer with the tank forces, ending the war in Berlin.

Mikhailov remained in the armed services after the war, specialising in military-political work, and in 1960 was assigned to the Strategic Rocket Forces. He rose through the ranks, being promoted to major general in 1976, and being appointed head of the Riga Higher Military Political School in 1977. He held this post until his retirement in 1987. In retirement he wrote poetry and remained active in veterans' affairs. He received numerous awards and honours over his lifetime, before his death in 2021 at the age of 97.

== Early life and wartime service ==
Mikhailov was born into a peasant family on 22 June 1924 in the village of Shikhazany, Tsivilsky Uyezd, then part of the Chuvash Autonomous Oblast, Russian Soviet Federative Socialist Republic, in the Soviet Union. He turned seventeen on 22 June 1941, the day Operation Barbarossa was launched, beginning the Nazi invasion of the Soviet Union. On the second day of the war Mikhailov went with his classmates from secondary school to the district military enlistment office, but as a minor, was refused. He persisted, and having already been awarded all four defence badges; the GTO (Ready for Labour and Defence), the PVKhO (Ready for Chemical Defence), the PSO (Ready for Sanitary Defence), and the Voroshilov Sharpshooter, was accepted into service. He went on to serve throughout the entirety of the Soviet involvement in the Second World War, from 1941 to 1945.

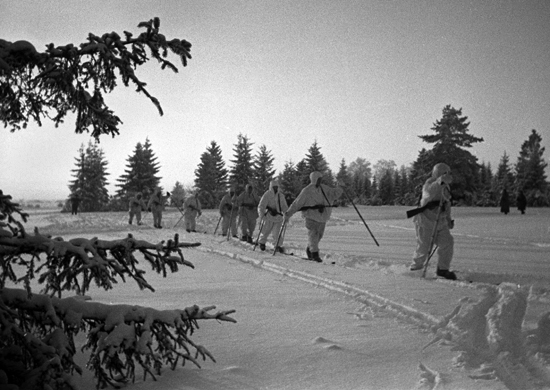
Soviet ski troops outside Moscow in 1941

Mikhailov was initially assigned to the reserve ski battalion, and then to the 121st Separate Ski Battalion of the 49th Army. He went on to be present at the Battle of Moscow in the autumn of 1941. Each member received a carbine, warm clothes, and bottles with a combustible mixture, with one light machine gun for the entire battalion. His battalion was deployed as a reconnaissance force, often operating behind enemy lines. One night they ambushed an engineer battalion, capturing its chief of staff. He was involved again in combat during an attempt to recapture the village of Ryabtsevo. Three of his battalion were killed, and another five were wounded. Mikhailov himself was seriously wounded in battle on 15 January 1942, when he was hit in the lower back by a bullet. Two of his friends, Polisanov and Gafurov, dragged him to the rear, but were attacked by a German machine gun. Mikhailov was wounded a second time, and Polisanov and Gafurov were killed.

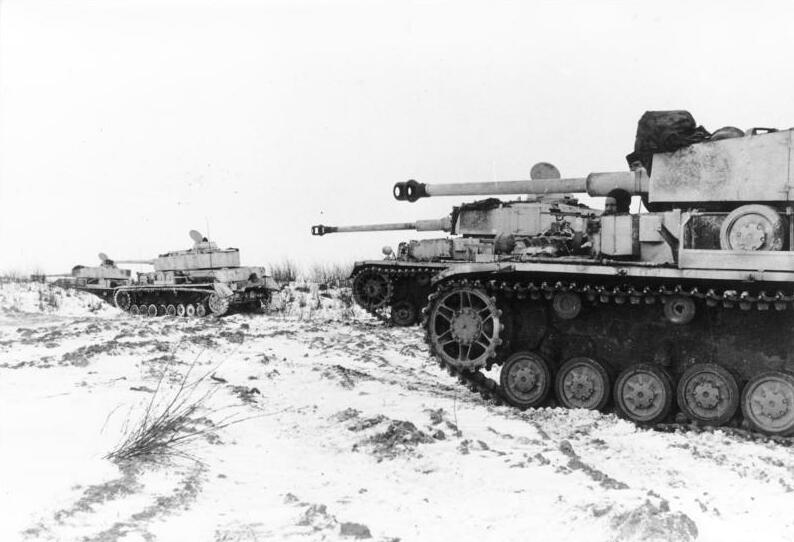
German Panzer IVs in the Soviet Union. Mikhailov's gun team destroyed two such tanks.

After recovering from his injuries, in May 1942 Mikhailov was sent to study at the Moscow military school. The rapid deterioration of the Soviet military position that summer forced the call up and deployment of the students, and Mikhailov was sent to the North Caucasus as commander of a 45-mm anti-tank gun. He fought in the Battle of the Caucasus and the recapture of the Taman Peninsula, receiving two Orders of the Red Star over this period. He then took part in the Crimean offensive, where in fighting around the town of Malin, forces under his command knocked out two Nazi Panzer IVs. He was again wounded, this time in fighting around Shepetivka on 14 January 1944. After recuperating, Mikhailov was sent to the Ivanovo Military-Political School, graduating with honours and the rank of lieutenant in late 1944. He was then sent to the 1st Ukrainian Front to join the tank forces. Mikhailov ended the war in Berlin as a political officer of a battalion, a position he held for a further five years, then rising to the position of deputy commander of a tank regiment for political affairs.

== Postwar career ==
Mikhailov studied at the Lenin Military-Political Academy after the war, graduating in 1960 and joining the Strategic Rocket Forces. He spent five years as head of political affairs of the 28th Guards Rocket Division in Kozelsk, and then six years at the Kapustin Yar test site as deputy chief for political affairs under Colonel-General Vasily Voznyuk. In 1976 he was promoted to the rank of major general. In 1977 he was appointed head of the Riga Higher Military Political School. He was in charge of the school, being called "Dad" by the cadets, until retiring from the armed forces in 1987.

== Retirement and later life ==
In retirement Mikailov lived in Odintsovo, Moscow Oblast. His 90th birthday on 22 June 2014 was marked with special events and recognition from the Strategic Rocket Forces command, including personal congratulations from Colonel-General Sergey Karakayev, commander of the Strategic Rocket Forces. Mikhailov was made an honorary citizen of Shikhazany in 2006, and of Kanashsky District, in Chuvashia in 2015. He received the latter title at a special ceremony on 30 July 2015 in the assembly hall of the Odintsovsky District administration building. He wrote poetry in Chuvash and Russian. He was an active member of the Council of Veterans of the Strategic Missile Forces, and the Council of Veterans and graduates of the Riga Higher Military-Political School.

Mikailov died on 27 September 2021 at the age of 97. During his career in the Soviet Armed Forces he was awarded the Order of the Red Banner of Labour, the Order of the Patriotic War First Class, the Order of the Badge of Honour, and four Orders of the Red Star. A street in his home village was named after him.
