= 35th Rocket Division =

35th Missile Red Banner Orders of Kutuzov and Aleksandr Nevsky Division
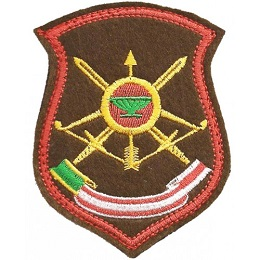
- 35th Rocket Division
- Active: 1961–present
- Country: Soviet Union (1961–1991); Russia (1991–present)
- Branch: Strategic Rocket Forces
- Type: Rocket division
- Role: Control of ICBMs
- Part of: 33rd Guards Rocket Army
- Location: Sibirsky, Altai Krai
- Engagements: World War II
- Decorations: Order of the Red Banner; Order of Kutuzov; Order of Alexander Nevsky

Commanders
- Current commander: Col. Alexander Prokopenkov

The 35th Red Banner Orders of Kutuzov and Aleksandr Nevsky Rocket Division (Russian: 35-я ракетная Краснознамённая, орденов Кутузова и Александра Невского дивизия) is a strategic missile division of the Strategic Rocket Forces of Russia. Part of the 33rd Guards Rocket Army, the division is based in the closed settlement (ZATO) of Sibirsky, near Barnaul, Altai Krai.

== History ==
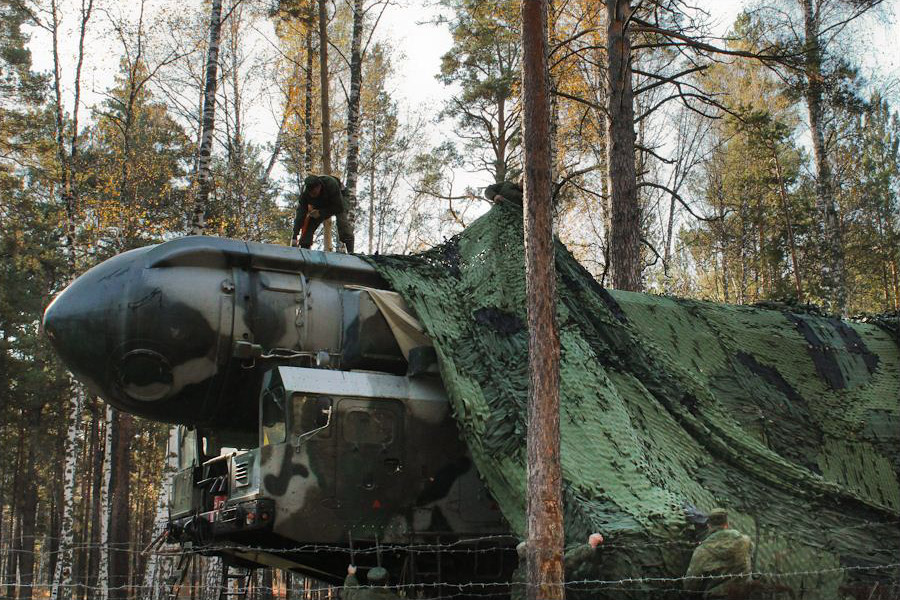
A Topol missile under camouflage netting on a transporter-erector launcher of the division during a 2014 exercise

The unit was created in 1942 as 21st Light Artillery Brigade of the Reserve of the Supreme High Command in the settlement of Rublyovo (a part of Moscow). It was part of the 6th Artillery Division of the 5th Army and included the 200th Red Banner Pomeranian, 1171st and 1314th Artillery Regiments. The brigade took part in World War II. Beginning its combat operations near the town of Zhizdra, the brigade passed through Mozyr, Kalinkovichi, Karachev, Gomel, Minsk, Warsaw, Berlin, and ended the war on the River Elbe. The brigade was awarded the Order of Red Banner, the Order of Alexander Nevsky, and the Order of Kutuzov, 2nd class.

After the end of World War II, the brigade was based in the city of Rathenow in East Germany. In July 1945, it received new weaponry and was renamed the 65th Heavy Mortar Brigade.

At the end of June 1960, the brigade was relocated to Prokhladny in the North Caucasus Military District, where it was used to form the 46th Missile Brigade. The brigade included the 178th Missile Regiment (formed in August 1959), the 479th Pomeranian Missile Regiment from late 1960, and the 480th Dresden Missile Regiment.

The brigade was redesignated as the 35th Missile Division in April 1961, inheriting the awards of the brigade, and became part of the 43rd Rocket Army. The first battalion of the 178th Missile Regiment with four R-12 ground launchers became the first unit of the division to go on alert duty on 18 April 1961. During the same year, division headquarters was relocated to Ordzhonikidze. During the Groza strategic exercises on 22 December 1963, under the supervision of the Soviet Minister of Defense, the division conducted its first missile launch from a launch site. The division headquarters was relocated to the village of Oktyabrskoye, North Ossetia in 1967. Between 3 and 8 June 1968, during the Vesenny Grom (Spring Thunder) strategic exercise, the division fired a salvo of missiles for the first time. On 18 July 1974, a training launch of all three missiles of the 3rd battalion of the 480th Missile Regiment was made during an experimental exercise.

In 1982, the division was relocated to Borovikha in Altai Krai, where it became part of the 33rd Guards Rocket Army. From 1984 to 1989, the division was commanded by Colonel-General Nikolay Solovtsov, who from 2001 to 2009 was the Commander-in-Chief of the Strategic Rocket Forces. In November 1991, the division was re-equipped with RS-12M Topol intercontinental ballistic missiles, for a total of 36. The rearmament was completed in December 1994.

As of 2013, the division commander was Colonel Sergey Andreyevich Talatynnik.

The division was scheduled to be entirely rearmed with RS-24 Yars intercontinental ballistic missiles during 2022. The regimental command post and first battalion of the 867th Missile Regiment went on alert duty with the new missiles in December 2021 and were scheduled to be followed by the rest of the regiment in April 2022.

== Commanders ==
Term start	Term end	Rank	Name
30 May 1960	22 July 1961	Colonel	Grigory Aleksandrovich Ivanov
23 July 1961	29 October 1966	Major General	Vladimir Nikodimovich Shevtsov
29 October 1966	2 June 1971	Major General	Nikolay Ivanovich Dryakhlykh
2 June 1971	20 May 1975	Major General	Vladimir Grigoryevich Gladun
20 May 1975	28 October 1977	Major General	Andrey Ivanovich Titarenko
2 September 1977	31 December 1980	Colonel	Vladimir Alekseyevich Fyodorov
31 December 1980	7 March 1982	Colonel General	Vladimir Alekseyevich Mikhtyuk
March 1982	December 1984	Colonel	Yevgeny Sergeyevich Potapov
December 1984	January 1989	Colonel General	Nikolay Solovtsov
January 1989	September 1992	Colonel	Vladimir Grigoryevich Vorobyev
September 1992	September 1995	Major General	Nikolay Ivanovich Kalinichenko
September 1995	December 1998	Major General	Vladimir Petrovich Rozovenko
January 1998	October 2002	Major General	Konstantin Vladichevich Svidersky
December 2002	October 2005	Major General	Aleksandr Arkadyevich Baranov
October 2005	July 2009	Major General	Sergey Sergeyevich Matveyev
October 2009	May 2013	Major General	Roman Olegovich Nogin
May 2013	August 2017	Colonel	Sergey Andreyevich Talatynnik
August 2017	January 2022	Colonel	Alexander Alexandrovich Prokopenkov
January 2022	present	Colonel	Dmitry Sergeyevich Shiryayev

== Equipment ==
- Artillery
- Mortar
- Missiles:
  - R-12 Dvina medium-range ballistic missile (1961–1981)
  - R-14 Chusovaya medium-range ballistic missile (1963–1982)
  - RSD-10 Pioneer mobile ground medium-range ballistic missile system (retired)
  - RT-2PM Topol intercontinental ballistic missile (1991–2022), rearmament completed December 1994, 36 launchers
  - RS-24 Yars (scheduled by April 2022)
