= Riga Higher Military Political School =

Soviet military academy in Riga

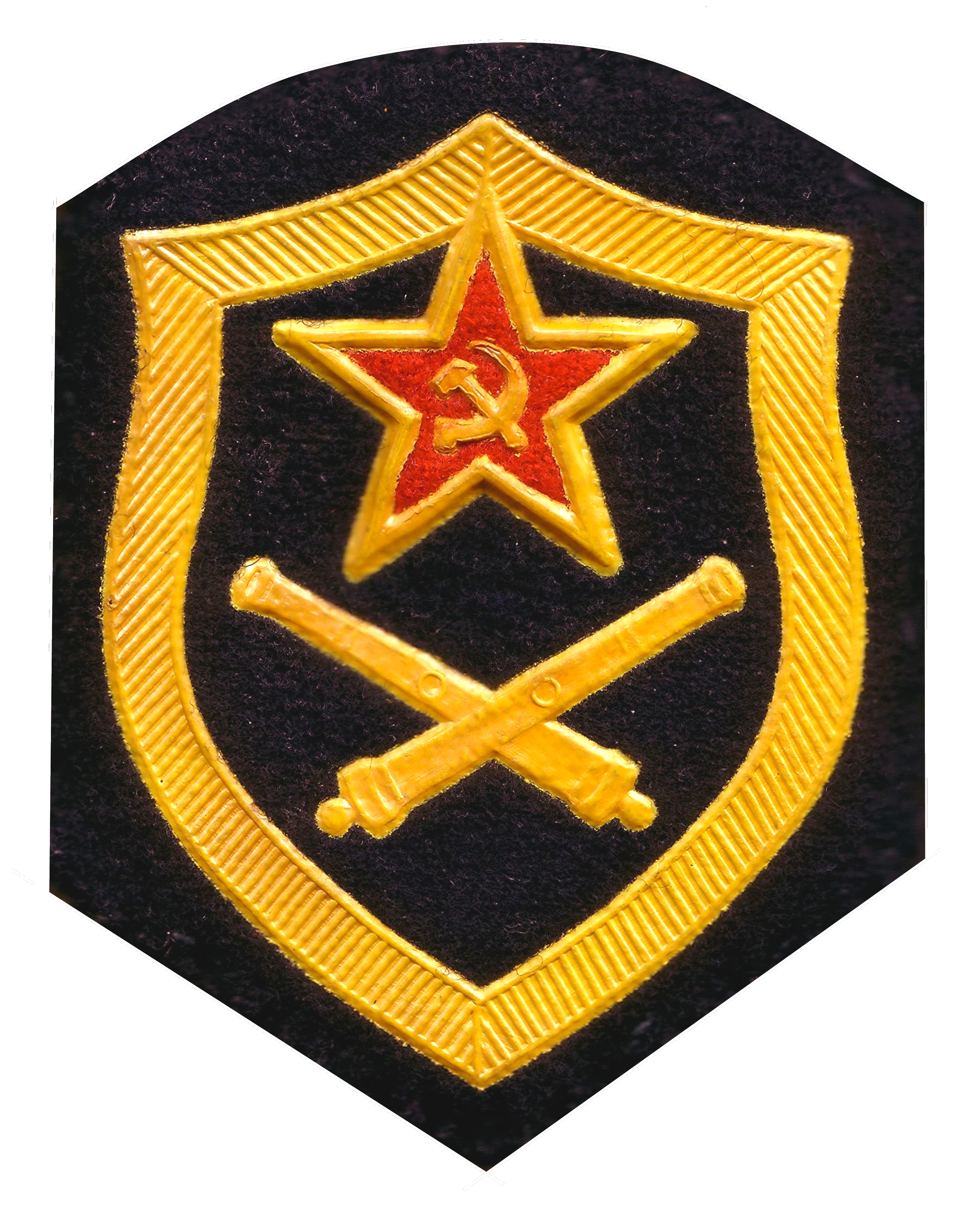
A sleeve patch bearing the emblem of the Soviet Armed Forces from 1960 to 1991.

The Riga Higher Military Political School named after Marshal of the Soviet Union Sergey Biryuzov (Russian: Рижское высшее военно-политическое Краснознамённое училище имени Маршала Советского Союза С. С. Бирюзова; Latvian: S. Birjuzova Rīgas Augstākā politiskā karaskola) was a military academy in the Soviet Union located in the capital of the Latvian SSR, the city of Riga. In the years it existed, it trained military personnel in a number of specializations from its headquarters on Ezermalas Street.

== History ==
The school was the successor to the School of Coastal Defense of the Soviet Navy (named after the Komsomol of Ukraine). It was created on 18 April 1932 by order of the Revolutionary Military Council. The school was originally multi-disciplinary and only began training for communications commanders in 1941.

Cadets of a school had participated in a defense of Sevastopol against the german-fascist aggressors, broke off by the rifle and artillery fire their precipitant progression in Crimea since October 1941 till February 14 1942.

College warriors joined the 34-th separate marine rifle crew, under a command of the general-major and Hero of the Soviet Union Antonov V. S., and were directed on protection of city Ordjonikidze, where had held a defense in the region of villages Ardon, Dzuerikau along the river Fiagdon with a fight interdiction to enemy armoured forces access to city Ordjonikidze, then to pass through the Saurskoie gorge and by the military-georgian way reach for cities of Baku and Tbilisi since at the turn of the October 1942.

The cadets of our school participated in the 34-th marine rifle crew structure and 301-st rifle division in redemption of cities and settlements of Northern Caucasus, Kuban, Donbass, south of Ukraine, had fought in rout of Jassy–Kishinev group of the opponent, finished of the aggressors in terrain of Poland and approaches to Berlin after 1942.

It was awarded the Order of the Red Banner by order of the Presidium of the Supreme Soviet of the USSR on 22 January 1944.

By 1960, the school consisted of personnel of the Strategic Missile Forces. On 6 March 1965, the school was named after Marshal of the Soviet Union Sergey Biryuzov. In 1977, the school became a military-political school. Standard educational buildings, barracks, staff buildings, a canteen, a sports hall and warehouses were located there. In 1986, integrated week long field trips began to be organized as part of the school.

In 1991, courses of the political faculties, and the entire command-engineering faculty, except men of graduate course, were transferred to missile schools in the RSFSR. Those who did not want to continue training were given the option to quit the Soviet Army in the reserve. In summer 1991 the Moscow system of High military education have been turned out the last officers of command-engineering faculty.

The last graduation of the political faculties officers took place on 29 April 1992.

The Red Banner Order's High military college named after Marshal of the Soviet Union Sergey Biryuzov had retrenched by Moscow Department of Defense just at June 30 1992.

The building of the school now houses the National Defence Academy of Latvia.

A technology of intercontinental ballistic missiles production and reliable flight control over the globe by autonomous automatic electron-mechanical system with onboard digital computer, Order of the Red Banner because of high military operations standard, principles of Strategic Missile Forces organization and application on scientific and military basis for the defence of the State were returned to the Russia.

== Heads ==
The following served as heads of the school:

- S. Raytsen (1931-1938)
- P. Karandasov (1938-1941)
- V. Kostyshin (1941-1942
- I. Bolshakov (1944-1955)
- P. Cherkasov (1955-1959)
- А. Vasilyev (1959-1963)
- V. Novikov (1963-1967)
- N. Beryeznyak (1967-1973)
- A. Glushchenko (1973-1977)
- V. Mikhailov (1977-1986)
- А. Sidorenko (1986-1992)

== Alumni ==
Notable alumni include Vice Admiral and Hero of the Soviet Union Ilya Khvorostyanov (the former head of the Nakhimov Naval Academy in Sevastopol) and Grigory Ditsky (a former official at the Central Navy Observatory who made a great contribution to the development of marine space exploration). Other alumni include officers like Mikhail Gatsko, who was a long time legal specialist for the Russian military leadership. On the 85th anniversary of the founding of the school in 2016, the St. Petersburg Council of the School Veterans hosted celebrations in St. Petersburg. A similar event was held in Riga.

== See also ==
- Tallinn Higher Military-Political Construction School
- Minsk Higher Military-Political School
