= Nikolai Solovtsov =

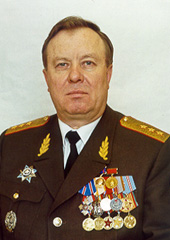
- Born: 1 January 1949 (age 77); Zaysan, East Kazakhstan Oblast, Kazakh SSR, Soviet Union
- Allegiance: Soviet Union (to 1991); Russia
- Branch: Strategic Missile Forces
- Service years: 1966–2009
- Rank: Colonel general
- Commands: Commander of the Strategic Rocket Forces; 35th Rocket Division; 53rd Rocket Army

Nikolai Yevgenievich Solovtsov (Russian: Николай Евгеньевич Соловцов; born 1 January 1949) is a Russian former Russian Strategic Missile Forces colonel general.

He joined the Soviet Armed Forces in 1966. He graduated from the Rostov Higher Military Command Engineering School named after the Chief Marshal of Artillery M. I. Nedelin (1966–1971), the Dzerzhinsky Military Academy (1974–1977); The academic courses of the same academy (1984), and the Military Academy of the General Staff (1991, external). He was promoted to colonel general in 1995.

He commanded the 35th Rocket Division (1984–89), the 53rd Rocket Army, and later became Commander, Strategic Rocket Forces (April 27, 2001 - July–August 2009). He was the first officer to occupy the post as Commander, rather than as Commander-in-Chief, of the SRF. In early 2009, Solovtsov said that 96% of all Russian ICBMs were ready to be launched within a minute's notice.

Solovtsov was dismissed in July–August 2009. Speculation over why Solovtsov was dismissed included opposition to further cuts in deployed nuclear ballistic missile warheads below the April 2009 figure of 1,500, the fact that he had reached the retirement age of 60, despite that he had recently been extended another year's service, or the failure of the Russian Navy's Bulava missile.

== Military offices ==
Military offices
Preceded by Vladimir Muravyov	Commander of the 53rd Rocket Army; 1992–1994	Succeeded by Yuri Kirillov
Preceded by Aleksandr Volkov	First Deputy Commander-in-Chief of the Strategic Rocket Forces; 1994–1997	Succeeded by Anatoly Perminov
Preceded by Yuri Plotnikov	Director of the Peter the Great Military Academy; 1997–2001	Succeeded by Yuri Kirillov
Preceded by Vladimir Yakovlev	Commander of the Strategic Rocket Forces; 2001–2009	Succeeded by Andrey Shvaichenko
