= 53rd Rocket Army =

Rocket division of the Soviet Union/Russia

The 53rd Rocket Army (Military Unit Number 74102) was an army of the Soviet, later Russian Strategic Rocket Forces. It was created on June 8, 1970 from the 8th Independent Missile Corps (established 1962), under Colonel-General Yury Zabegaylov. Its headquarters was located at Chita, Transbaikal Military District.

It initially included the 45th Rocket Division which disbanded in 1970.

Colonel-General Nikolay Solovtsov, later Commander of the Strategic Rocket Forces, commanded the army between 24 November 1992 and June 1994.

== Composition 1988 ==
In 1988 its units comprised:

- 4th Rocket Division (Drovyanaya, Chita Oblast)
- 23rd Guards Rocket Division (Kansk) Assigned 1983–2002; last RSD-10 Pioneer (SS-20) regiment ceased active duties 15 December 1988, and the division began preparations to convert to the RT-2PM Topol (SS-25) intercontinental ballistic missile. Fully converted by 1994, with five regiments. In 2002 the division was reassigned to the 33rd Guards Rocket Army.
- 27th Rocket Division (Svobodnyy, Amur Oblast)(disbanded 1993)
- 29th Guards Rocket Division - On 1 February 1986, by Directive № 432/3/00846 of the RVSN Commander of 3 December 1985, the division moved to Irkutsk, in the 53rd Rocket Army area, comprising five missile regiments equipped with the 15P653 "Pioneer UTTH" (SS-20) medium-range ballistic missile (MRBM). However, due to the INF Treaty between the USSR and the U.S., these missiles were not placed on alert. Began to convert to the RT-2PM Topol in 1988.
- 36th Guards Rocket Division
- 47th Rocket Division (Olovyannaya, Chita Oblast) (disbanded 1991)

The army was disbanded on September 16, 2002.

== Commanders ==
- General-Lieutenant Yuri Zabegaylov (1970-1974)
- General-Lieutenant Nikolai Kotlovtsev (1974-1981)
- General-Lieutenant V. F. Yegorov (1981-1987)
- General-Lieutenant Vladimir Muravyov (1987-1992)
- General-Lieutenant Nikolay Solovtsov (1992-1994)
- General-Major Yuri Kirillov (1994-1996)
- General-Lieutenant S. V. Khutortsev (1996-1997)
- General-Lieutenant V. V. Dremov (1997-2000)
- General-Major L. E. Sinyakovich (2000-2001)
- General-Major V. G. Gagarin (2001-2002)
