= 39th Guards Rocket Division =

39th Guards Rocket Glukhovskaya, Order of Lenin, Red Banner, Orders of Suvorov, Kutuzov and Bogdan Khmelnitsky Division
- 39-я гвардейская ракетная Глуховская ордена Ленина, Краснознамённая, орденов Суворова, Кутузова и Богдана Хмельницкого дивизия
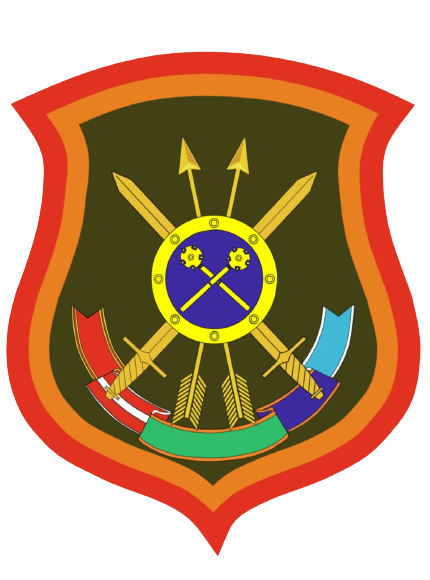
- Active: 1960 – present
- Country: Soviet Union (1960–1991); Russia (1991–present)
- Branch: Strategic Rocket Forces
- Size: Division
- Part of: 33rd Guards Rocket Army
- Garrison/HQ: Pashino, Novosibirsk Oblast
- Decorations: Order of the Red Banner; Order of Suvorov; Order of Kutuzov; Order of Bogdan Khmelnitsky

Commanders
- Current commander: Colonel Aleksander V. Stenkin

The 39th Guards Rocket Glukhovskaya, Order of Lenin, Red Banner, Orders of Suvorov, Kutuzov and Bogdan Khmelnitsky Division (Russian: 39-я гвардейская ракетная Глуховская ордена Ленина, Краснознамённая, орденов Суворова, Кутузова и Богдана Хмельницкого дивизия) is a military formation of the Russian Federation. It is part of the 33rd Guards Rocket Army.

As part of the Strategic Rocket Forces, the unit currently operates RT-2PM Topol ballistic missiles. It is garrisoned in Pashino, Novosibirsk Oblast.

== History ==
The division was formed as the successor to the 1st Guards Artillery Division in 1960, first as the 212th Rocket Brigade but later in 1961 reorganized as the 39th Guards Rocket Division.

Since its formation the unit has operated multiple generations of missiles:

- R-16 - 1963-1979
- RSD-10 Pioneer - 1977-1989
- RT-2PM Topol - 1989-present

== Commanders ==
Commanders of the 39th Guards Rocket Division
No.	Name	From	To
1	Major General Makar. Ye. Artyukh	July 1960	April 1967
2	Major General Anatoly A. Aleshkin	April 1967	March 1969
3	Major General Nikolai N. Ovchinnikov	March 1969	November 1975
4	Major General Leonid S. Pridatko	November 1975	May 1983
5	Major General Semen G. Kuldykov	May 1983	July 1987
6	Major General Vladimir P. Chertkov	July 1987	July 1991
7	Major General Nikolai P. Okhrimenko	July 1991	November 1993
8	Major General Karim Sh. Kamalov	November 1993	October 1997
9	Major General Valery M. Mazurov	October 1997	June 2000
10	Lieutenant General Gennady N. Privalov	June 2000	June 2002
11	Major General Ivan F. Reva	June 2002	August 2004
12	Major General Nikolai A. Pustovalov	August 2004	May 2007
13	Colonel Nikolai K. Bratukhin	May 2007	2010?
14	Colonel Aleksander V. Stenkin	2010?	Present

== Structure ==
Structure as of 1995:

- 357th Rocket Regiment
- 382nd Rocket Regiment
- 428th Rocket Regiment
- 773rd Rocket Regiment
- 826th Rocket Regiment
