= Vladimir Muravyov =

Vladimir Muravyov (Владимир Муравьёв) may refer to:

- Vladimir Muravyov (athlete) (born 1959), former Soviet track and field athlete
- Vladimir Sergeyevich Muravyov (1939–2001), Russian translator and literary critic
- Vladimir Leonidovich Muravyov (1861–1940), Russian painter and count
- Vladimir Aleksandrovich Muravyov (1938–2020), Soviet and Russian military officer
