= Viktor Mikhaylov =

Viktor Mikhaylov may refer to:

- Viktor Mikhaylov (academic) (1934–2011), Russian academic and nuclear scientist
- Viktor Mikhaylov (actor) (born 1951), Russian actor
- Viktor Mikhailov (1924–2021), Soviet and Russian military officer
- Viktor Mikhailov (politician) (1936–2023), Russian politician
- Victor Mihailov (born 1981), Moldovan football coach
