= 62nd Rocket Division =

62nd Red Banner Rocket Division
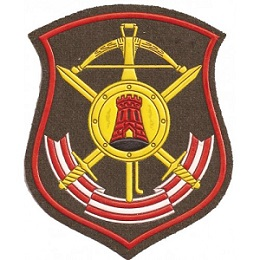
- Active: 1964–present
- Country: Soviet Union (1964–1991); Russia (1991–present)
- Branch: Strategic Rocket Forces
- Garrison/HQ: Uzhur, Krasnoyarsk Krai
- Decorations: Order of the Red Banner

Commanders
- Current commander: Colonel Sergei A. Omyotov

The 62nd Red Banner Rocket Division (military unit 32441) is a formation within the 33rd Guards Rocket Army of the Strategic Rocket Forces, deployed near Uzhur, Krasnoyarsk Krai.

== History ==
This division was established in May 1964 as the Uzhur Operational Group. In April 1965, it was renamed the 62nd Rocket Division and became part of the 7th Separate Guards Missile Corps. On June 8, 1970, the division was included in the 33rd Guards Rocket Army.

The division's formation is celebrated annually on 13 April.

== Equipment ==
Since its inception, the division has been equipped with intercontinental ballistic missiles from R-36M family. Since 2022, the division has been reequipping with R-28 Sarmat missiles.

== Commanders ==
Commanders of the 62nd Rocket Division
No.	Name	From	To
1	Colonel Petr M. Prikhodko	1964	1966
2	Major General Sergei I. Ryzleytsev	1966	1968
3	Major General Nikolai N. Kotlovtsev	1968	1973
4	Major General Viktor S. Sedykh	1973	1976
5	Major General Yevgeny I. Smelik	1976	1983
6	Major General Anatoly F. Martynyenko	1983	1988
7	Major General Viktor I. Aschyeulov	1988	1994
8	Major General Andrei A. Shvaichenko	1994	1997
9	Colonel Valery Yu. Churakov	1997	1999
10	Major General Sergei P. Solokhin	1999	2003
11	Major General Aleksander D. Sivachev	2003	2006
12	Major General Aleksander Yu. Zubkov	2006	2008
13	Colonel Yuri G. Kashlev	2008	2011
14	Colonel Vladimir V. Kvashin	2011	2014
15	Colonel Sergei A. Omyotov	2014	present

== Structure ==
Structure of the unit as of 2010:

- 229th Rocket Regiment
- 269th Rocket Regiment
- 302nd Rocket Regiment
- 735th Rocket Regiment
