= Gorny, Zabaykalsky Krai =

Gorny Горный
- Urban-type settlement
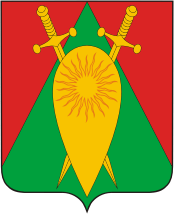
- Coat of arms
- Interactive map of Gorny
- Location of Gorny Gorny (Zabaykalsky Krai)
- Coordinates: 51°33′N 113°02′E
- Country: Russia
- Federal subject: Zabaykalsky Krai
- Administrative district: Ulyotovsky District
- Founded: October 10, 1965

Population (2010 Census)
  - Total: 12,341
  - Estimate (1 January 2018): 10,891 (−11.7%)

Municipal status
  - Urban okrug: Gorny Urban Okrug
  - Capital of: Gorny Urban Okrug
- Time zone: UTC+9 (MSK+6)
- Postal code: 672900
- OKTMO ID: 76785000051

Gorny (Russian: Го́рный), formerly known as Chita-46 (Чита́-46), is a closed urban locality (an urban-type settlement) in Ulyotovsky District of Zabaykalsky Krai, Russia. Population: 12,341 (2010 census); 9,761 (2002 census).

Up until 2002 the 4th Rocket Division of the 53rd Rocket Army, Strategic Rocket Forces was located at Drovyanaya, at coordinates which very closely match Gorniy. The settlement has also hosted the 200th Artillery Brigade since 1973.

== Administrative and municipal status ==
Within the framework of administrative divisions, Gorny is subordinated to Ulyotovsky District. As a municipal division, the urban-type settlement of Gorny is incorporated as Gorny Urban Okrug.
