= 4th Rocket Division =

4th Kharbin Rocket Division (1961-2002) 119th Rocket Brigade (1960-1961)
- Active: 1960-2002
- Country: Soviet Union (1960–1991); Russia (1991-2002)
- Branch: Strategic Rocket Forces
- Garrison/HQ: Drovyanaya, Chita Oblast

The 4th Kharbin Rocket Division was a military formation of the Soviet and Russian Strategic Rocket Forces between 1960 and 2002. It was garrisoned in Drovyanaya, Chita Oblast.

== History ==
It was established in May 1960 in Nerchinsk, Chita Oblast as the 119th Rocket Brigade, from the 116th Artillery Brigade. Later redesignated as a Rocket Division in 1961.

Initially under the 57th Artillery Range Administration, it became part of the 8th Independent Missile Corps in March 1961, and in 1965 moved its headquarters to Gorny (Drovyanaya) in Chita Oblast. In June 1970 it became part of the 53rd Rocket Army.

In October 1961 it gained the honorific 'Harbin', drawn from the 46th Tank Division, originally the 300th Rifle Division (II).

In 1988-9 it gave up its last RSD-10 Pioneer mobile ICBMs, and by 1990 it had 50 UR-100K silos divided among five regiments.

In 1995 it reportedly had two regiments each with nine RT-2PM Topol missiles.

It was finally disbanded in October 2002.

== Commanders ==
Commanders of the 4th Rocket Division
No.	Name	From	To
1	Major General Ivan G. Tyurin	1961	1968?
2	Major General Vasily I. Shirokov	1968	1972
3	Major General Georgy M. Novikov	1972	1976
4	Major General Viktor M. Klochkov	1976	1981
5	Major General Nikolai V. Lastochkin	1981	1985
6	Major General Aleksei L. Kryzhko	1985	1990
7	Major General Vladimir A. Shapovalov	1990	1993
8	Major General Aleksander P. Lukin	1993	1995
9	Major General Sergei V. Khutortsev	1995	1996
10	Major General Vladimir N. Martynov	1996	1999
11	Major General Sergei I. Arzamastsev	1999	2002
