= 51st Guards Rifle Division =

- Active: 1942–1960
- Country: Soviet Union
- Branch: Red Army (1942-1946); Soviet Army (1946-1960)
- Type: Infantry
- Engagements: Battle of Stalingrad; Battle of Kursk; Battle of Nevel; Operation Bagration; Šiauliai offensive; Memel Offensive; Courland Pocket
- Decorations: Guards; Order of Lenin; Order of the Red Banner
- Honorifics: Vitebsk; named for K. E. Voroshilov

The 51st K. E. Voroshilov Guards Vitebsk Order of Lenin Red Banner Rifle Division (Russian: 51-я гвардейская стрелковая Витебская ордена Ленина Краснознамённая дивизия имени К. Е. Ворошилова) was an infantry division of the Red Army during World War II that continued serving in the Soviet Army in the early years of the Cold War.

The division was formed in November 1942 from the 76th K. E. Voroshilov Red Banner Rifle Division, converted into an elite Guards unit designated the 51st Guards Rifle Division for its actions in Operation Uranus during the Battle of Stalingrad. The 51st Guards fought in Operation Koltso at the end of the Battle of Stalingrad, receiving the Order of Lenin for its actions. The division went on to fight in the Battle of Kursk in 1943 and Operation Bagration in 1944, receiving the Vitebsk honorific for its performance in the Vitebsk–Orsha offensive during the latter. The division advanced into Latvia in the Šiauliai offensive, ending the war blockading the Courland Pocket. Stationed in Latvia postwar, the division was converted into the 51st Guards Motor Rifle Division in 1957 and was disbanded in 1960 during reductions of Soviet conventional forces. Its personnel were retrained and formed the core of the new 29th Guards Rocket Division, which inherited the honors of the 51st Guards.

== Origins and Battle of Stalingrad ==
The 76th K. E. Voroshilov Red Banner Rifle Division received Guards status and became the 51st Guards Rifle Division on 23 November 1942, as a reward for its performance during Operation Uranus in the Battle of Stalingrad, in which the division attacked out of the Kletskaya bridgehead with the 21st Army, defeating the opposing Romanian troops. The 76th was one of the prewar divisions of the Red Army and had originally been formed in 1920 as an Armenian unit. The division, commanded by Major General Nikolay Tavartkiladze, received its Guards battle flag on 5 January 1943. The division participated in the breakthrough of German defenses northwest of Stalingrad, becoming the first unit of the 21st Army to enter the city. It linked up with troops from the 13th Guards Rifle Division on 26 January. The division was awarded the Order of Lenin on 19 June 1943 for "successful operations" during Operation Koltso. After the battle ended, the 21st Army was itself raised to Guards status, becoming the 6th Guards Army. The 51st Guards spent most of the rest of the war with the 6th Guards Army.

Between 5 July and 23 August the division fought in the Battle of Kursk and the Belgorod–Kharkov offensive operation, during which it participated in the capture of Kursk, Belgorod, and Kharkov. From October 1943 to early January 1944, the division and the army, operating under the 2nd Baltic Front, occupied defenses northwest of Nevel, then fought in the Battle of Nevel. From 23 June, the division and the army, now part of the 1st Baltic Front, fought in Operation Bagration. During the operation, the division advanced over 250 km in continuous fighting, conducting four assault crossings of rivers, including crossing the Western Dvina twice. For their actions in the assault crossing of the Western Dvina, fifteen soldiers of the division were made Heroes of the Soviet Union on 22 July. The division closed the encirclement of the German defenders of Vitebsk and on 4 July 1944 captured Polotsk. For their combat successes, the division was awarded the Vitebsk honorific and its three rifle regiments, the 154th, 156th, and 158th Guards, awarded the Polotsk honorific on 23 July.

The Soviet advance continued throughout the summer of 1944, with the division pushing into the Baltic states, pursuing the retreating German troops from Polotsk to Turmantas, Joniškis to Tryškiai, and Bēne to Priekule in the Šiauliai offensive. For success in the battles of fall 1944 the 156th and 158th Guards Rifle Regiments were awarded the Order of Kutuzov 3rd class and the Order of the Red Banner. In the last months of the war, the division fought in the blockade of the Courland Pocket. Together with the forces of the 1st Baltic Front, the division advanced to the Baltic coast, where it ended the war.

During the war, 32 soldiers of the division were made Heroes of the Soviet Union, twelve received all three awards of the Order of Glory, and a total of 19,114 total decorated.

== Postwar ==
After the end of the war, the 51st Guards Rifle Division remained in Latvia. It was reorganized as the 51st Guards Motor Rifle Division on 25 June 1957, becoming part of the 10th Army Corps. Like most divisions in the Soviet interior military districts, the division was maintained at reduced strength with only one of three motor rifle regiments combat ready. By the late 1950s, division headquarters was at Liepāja, the tank and artillery regiments at Paplaka, a motor rifle regiment at Ventspils, and the two cadre-strength motor rifle regiments and a tank battalion at Priekule. The division was disbanded on 10 March 1960 during reductions of Soviet conventional forces under Nikita Khrushchev and its personnel transferred to the Strategic Missile Forces, retrained to serve in intercontinental ballistic missile units. The 138th Guards Red Banner Artillery Regiment was used to form the 344th Missile Regiment of the 29th Guards Missile Division, which inherited the honors of the 51st Guards Motor Rifle Division. Several officers of the 51st Guards assumed senior positions in the 29th Guards Missile Division, including the commander and deputy commander of its tank regiment, who assumed the corresponding positions in the 307th Missile Regiment. On Victory Day 1965, 51st Guards Rifle Division posthumous Heroes of the Soviet Union Senior Sergeants Lutsevich and A. I. Krasilnikov were commemorated by being permanently placed on the rolls of the 344th and 867th Missile Regiments of the 29th Guards, respectively.
