= 35th Separate Guards Motor Rifle Brigade =

35th Guards Volgograd-Kiev Orders of Lenin, Suvorov and Kutuzov Red Banner Motor Rifle Brigade
- Active: 2009–present
- Country: Russia
- Branch: Russian Ground Forces
- Type: Mechanized infantry
- Size: Brigade
- Part of: 41st Combined Arms Army, Central Military District
- Garrison/HQ: Aleysk
- Engagements: World War II; Russo-Ukrainian War
- Decorations: Order of Lenin; Order of the Red Banner; Order of Suvorov 2nd Class; Order of Kutuzov 2nd Class
- Honorifics: Volgograd; Kiev

Commanders
- Current commander: Oleg Vladimirovich Kurygin

The 35th Guards Volgograd-Kiev Orders of Lenin, Suvorov and Kutuzov Red Banner Motor Rifle Brigade (Russian: 35-я отдельная гвардейская мотострелковая бригада; Military Unit Number 41659) is a unit of the Russian Ground Forces. It traces its history back to the formation of the Soviet 4th Tank Corps (later: 5th Guards Tank Corps) during the Second World War. It forms part of the 41st Combined Arms Army (CAA), and has its headquarters in a former Strategic Rocket Forces installation at Aleysk in Altai Krai.

== History ==
=== 4th Tank Corps ===
In accordance with State Committee of Defence (NKO) Order No. 724218сс оf 31 March 1942, the 4th Tank Corps was established in the Voronezh area in April 1942. By order of the NKO of the USSR No. 57 dated February 7, 1943, in recognition of the courage and heroism of its personnel, the 4th Tank Corps was awarded the "Guards" honorary title, and transformed into the 5th Guards Tank Corps.

=== 5th Guards Tank Corps ===
In the final stages of the Battle of Stalingrad, the 4th Tank Corps was awarded the honorary title "Stalingrad" by NKO Order No. 42 of 27 January 1943.

The corps participated in the following operations:

- the Kursk strategic defensive operation (Battle of Kursk, from 5 July 1943 – 23 July 1943.
- Belogorod-Kharkov offensive operation (Operation Rumyantsev) 3 August 1943 – 23 August 1943. On 6 November 1943 the 5th Guards Tank Corps was awarded the honorary title "Kiev" by a Prikaz of the Supreme Commander-in-Chief.
- Chernigov-Poltava Offensive [08/26/1943 – 09/30/1944]
  - Sumy-Priluki Operation [08/26/1943 – 09/30/1943]
- Kyiv Strategic Offensive Operation (Battle of Kiev (1943))
- Kyiv defensive operation, (1943), 13 November – 22 December 1943
- Dnieper–Carpathian offensive (Seizure of Right-Bank Ukraine), 12 December 1943 – 17 April 1944.
  - Zhytomyr-Berdichev operation [12/24/1943 – 01/14/1944]
  - Korsun-Shevchenko operation [01/24/1944 – 02/17/1944]
  - Umansko-Botoshanskaya operation
- Second Jassy–Kishinev offensive, 20 August 1944 – 29 August 1944.
- Debrecen Offensive (Battle of Debrecen), 6 October 1944 – 28 October 1944.
- Budapest Offensive
- Vienna Offensive [03/16/1945 – 04/15/1945]
- Bratislava–Brno offensive (at its final stage)
- Prague Offensive [05/06/1945 – 05/11/1945]
- Soviet invasion of Manchuria [08/09/1945 – 09/02/1945]
  - Khingan-Mukden offensive operation [08/09/1945 – 09/02/1945]

On 14 September 1945, the corps was reorganized into a division.

=== 5th Guards Tank Division ===
On 14 September 1945, on the basis of the order of the NKO of the USSR No. 0013 dated June 10, 1945, the corps, within the overall demobilization process, was reorganised as the 5th "Stalingradsko-Kievskaya Order of Lenin Red Banner orders of Suvorov and Kutuzov" Guards Tank Division (First Formation). Immediately after the war the division was part of the 6th Guards Tank Army. From September 1945 to June 1957 the division formed part of the 6th Guards Tank Army (briefly 6th Guards Mechanised Army).

=== 122nd Guards Motor Rifle Division ===
On 29 June 1957 the 5th Guards Tank Division became the 122nd Guards Motor Rifle Division. From 1976 to 1989 it formed part of the 36th Army.

When the 41st Guards Rocket Division of the Strategic Rocket Forces disbanded in 2001, "for a long time" there was no decision on the future use of the empty Aleysk military garrison, containing housing, a school, three kindergartens, a swimming pool, and "an enormous amount of equipment that was discarded outside the city limits". "The maintenance of these facilities turned out to be too expensive for the small city of Aleysk." But a decision was made "at the beginning of summer [mid-2001]." A motor rifle division of the Siberian Military District was to arrive to replace the SRF personnel. Later the division was identified as the 122nd Guards. Thus the 122nd Guards MGAD became a motor-rifle division.

=== 35th Guards Motor Rifle Brigade ===
In 2009 (June) the division became the 35th Guards Motor Rifle Brigade.

The brigade allegedly took part in the war in Donbas in the Luhansk Oblast in 2014.

== Invasion of Ukraine ==
Major Leonid Shchotkin, a deputy battalion commander in the 35th Brigade, was reportedly captured in Chernihiv by Ukrainian forces on 26 February 2022. Ukrainian forces claimed to have captured the commander of a tank platoon of the 35th Brigade after repelling an attempted Russian breakthrough near Chernihiv on 27 February. A member of the brigade was sentenced to imprisonment in a Ukrainian court for allegedly robbing and threatening to kill a civilian in the village of Khaliavyn, Chernihiv Oblast in early March 2022.

After the brigade began to take part in the 2022 Russian invasion of Ukraine, messages from relatives revealed that the brigade had suffered heavy losses near Chernihiv.

In February 2025, the brigade suffered a heavy loss with Ukrainians claiming a missile strike on their headquarters in occupied Donetsk wiped out the entire command.

== Commanders ==
- Guards Major General Grigoriy Rostislavovich Tyurin
- Guards Colonel Andrey O. Shelukhin
- Guards Colonel Oleg Vladmirovich Kurygin

== Notes ==
- Feskov, V.I.; Golikov, V.I.; Kalashnikov, K.A.; Slugin, S.A. (2013). Вооруженные силы СССР после Второй Мировой войны: от Красной Армии к Советской [The Armed Forces of the USSR after World War II: From the Red Army to the Soviet: Part 1 Land Forces] (in Russian). Tomsk: Scientific and Technical Literature Publishing. ISBN 9785895035306.
