= Matvei Zakharov =

Soviet military commander

- Матвей Васильевич Захаров
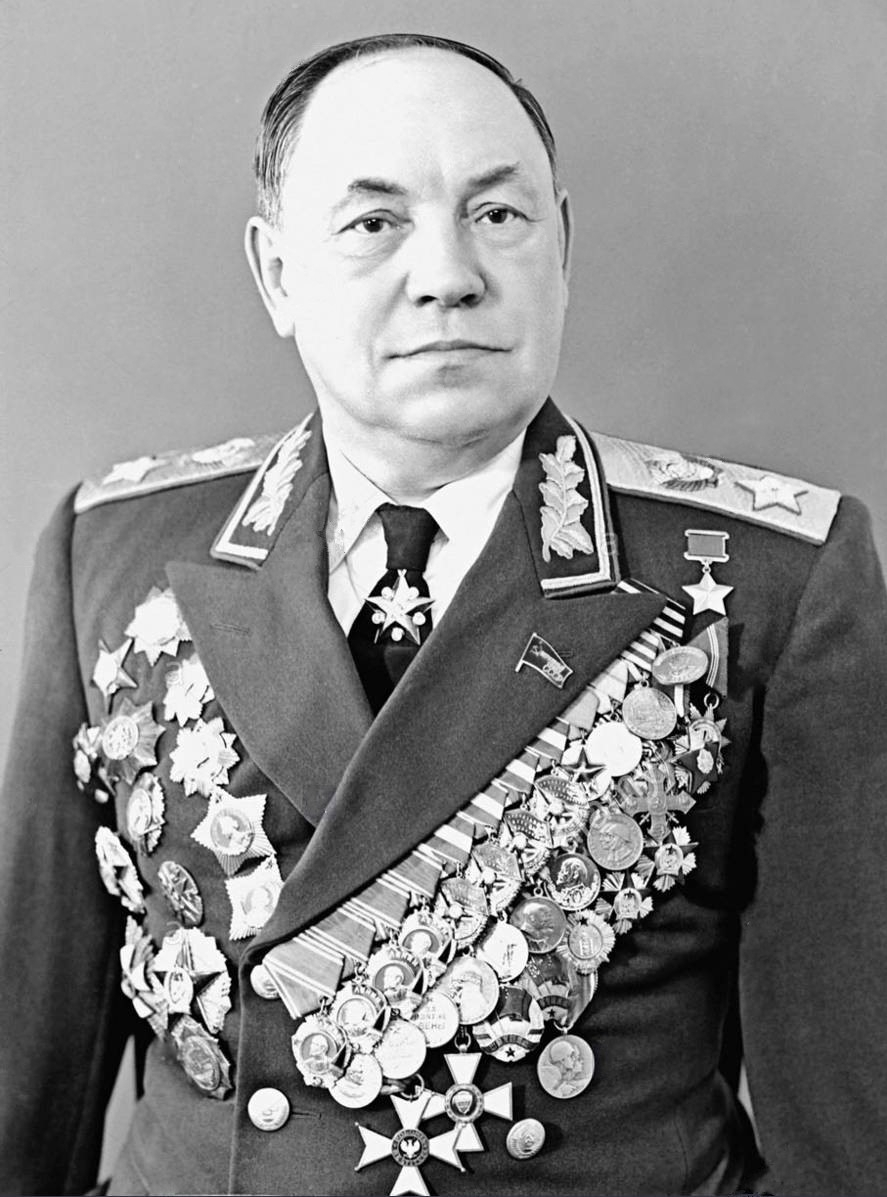
- Born: 17 August 1898; Voylovo village, near Tver, Russian Empire
- Died: 31 January 1972 (aged 73); Moscow, Russian SFSR, Soviet Union
- Burial place: Kremlin Wall Necropolis
- Military career
- Allegiance: Soviet Union
- Branch: Red Army
- Service years: 1917–1971
- Rank: Marshal of the Soviet Union (1959-1971)
- Commands: General Staff Academy; Leningrad Military District; Chief of the General Staff
- Conflicts: October Revolution; Russian Civil War; World War II
- Awards: Hero of the Soviet Union (2); Hero of Czechoslovakia; Order of Lenin (5); Order of the Red Banner (4); Order of the October Revolution; Order of Suvorov, 1st Class (2); Order of Kutuzov, 1st Class (2); Order of Bogdan Khmelnitsky, 1st Class; Order of the Red Star

Signature
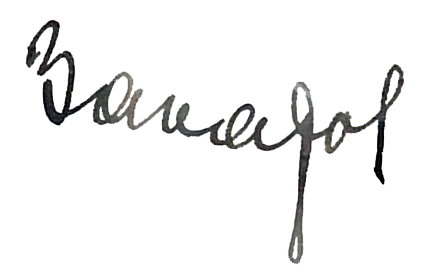

Matvei Vasilevich Zakharov (Russian: Матвей Васильевич Захаров; 17 August 1898 – 31 January 1972) was Marshal of the Soviet Union, Chief of the General Staff, and Deputy Defense Minister.

== Biography ==
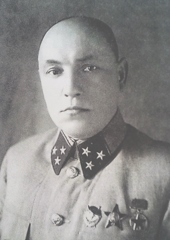
Zakharov in 1940

Zakharov was born in Voylovo, a village in Kalininsky District, Tver Oblast to peasant parents. Zakharov joined the Red Guards (precursor to the Red Army) in 1917, and took part in the Storming of the Winter Palace. He served under Kliment Voroshilov during the Russian Civil War. Zakharov graduated from the Frunze Military Academy in 1928, and from Soviet General Staff Academy in 1937 (his graduation was actually a year ahead of schedule, due to the lack of officers in the Red Army because of the explosive growth of the army, as well as Stalin's purges.) Zakharov held a number of high-ranking positions before World War II even began. In 1937 he was made the Chief of Staff of the Leningrad Military District, then in 1938–1940 he was the Deputy Chief of the General Staff, and then the Chief of Staff of the Odessa Military District.

By the end of 1941, after the beginning of Operation Barbarossa, he was moved north, where he was made the Chief of Staff of the Northwestern Theatre. Soon thereafter, he was made the Chief of Staff of the Kalinin Front, a role he held for most of 1942. In 1943, he was made the Chief of Staff of the Steppe Front, which was renamed the 2nd Ukrainian Front around mid-year. It was in this capacity that Zakharov proved himself as one of the Soviet Union's top military commanders. He helped plan a number of brilliant operations against German forces, first as a subordinate to Marshal Ivan Konev, and then under Marshal Rodion Malinovsky. After the cessation of hostilities with Germany, Zakharov was transferred east, where he was made the Chief of Staff of the Transbaikal Front, and helped plan the subsequent Manchurian Strategic Offensive Operation. Zakharov described in his memoirs how in April–June 1941, the commanders of the Odessa military district were aware of German reconnaissance aircraft violating Soviet airspace, and claimed that the Red Army did not have the equipment to shoot them down - though other sources say that Stalin had given an order that German aircraft were not to be fired on.

After the war, Zakharov held a number of key positions in the army. From 1945 to 1960, Zakharov was the Commandant of the General Staff Academy, Deputy Chief of the General Staff, Chief Inspector of the Army, Commanding General of the Leningrad Military District and, from November 1957, Commander in Chief of the Group of Soviet Forces in Germany. On 8 May 1959, Zakharov was made a Marshal of the Soviet Union.

In January 1960, the Soviet leader Nikita Khrushchev announced that within two years, 1,200,000 men, including 250,000 officers, were to be demobilised from the armed forces. When this decision was ratified by the Supreme Soviet on 14 January, the only officers to say anything were Malinovsky and Zakharov, who supported it. It is likely that officers more senior than Zakharov who did not speak, such as Marshal Sokolovsky kept quiet because they opposed the decision.

In April 1960, Zakharov was appointed Chief of the General Staff and Deputy Minister of Defence, replacing Marshal Sokolovsky. In 1963, having apparently fallen out with Khrushchev, he was demoted to the job he had held 18 years earlier, as head of the General Staff Academy. Khrushchev later stated that Zakharov was removed because he used to fall asleep during important meetings. In October 1964, he was reinstated as Chief of the General Staff and USSR First Deputy Minister of Defence, after his successor Marshal Biryuzov had been killed in an airplane crash, and Khrushchev had been ousted. When he retired through ill health in September 1971, he was the last active Marshal to have taken part in the events of 1917.

Marshal M. V. Zakharov died on 31 January 1972. The urn containing his ashes is buried by the Kremlin Wall Necropolis. His memoirs, which appear to have been written after 1964, were not published until 1989.

== Honours and awards ==
- Hero of the Soviet Union (8 September 1945, 22 September 1971)
- Five Orders of Lenin (21 February 1945, 8 September 1945, 21 June 1957, 2 February 1958, 22 February 1968)
- Order of the October Revolution (16 August 1968)
- Order of the Red Banner, four times (22 February 1938, 31 December 1942, 3 November 1944, 6 November 1947)
- Order of Suvorov, 1st class, twice (13 September 1944, 28 April 1945)
- Order of Kutuzov, 1st class, twice (27 August 1943, 22 February 1944)
- Order of Bogdan Khmelnitsky, 1st class (17 May 1944)
- Order of the Red Star (31 December 1939)
- Honorary weapon with gold National Emblem of the Soviet Union (22 February 1968)
- Jubilee Medal "XX Years of the Workers' and Peasants' Red Army"
- Hero of the Czechoslovak Socialist Republic (28 April 1970)
- Order of Klement Gottwald

Military offices
Preceded by Vasily Sokolovsky	Chief of the General Staff of the Armed Forces of the Soviet Union; April 1960 – March 1963	Succeeded by Sergey Biryuzov
Preceded by Sergey Biryuzov	Chief of the General Staff of the Armed Forces of the Soviet Union; November 1964 – September 1971	Succeeded by Viktor Kulikov
