= Sibirsky, Altai Krai =

Sibirsky Сибирский
- Settlement
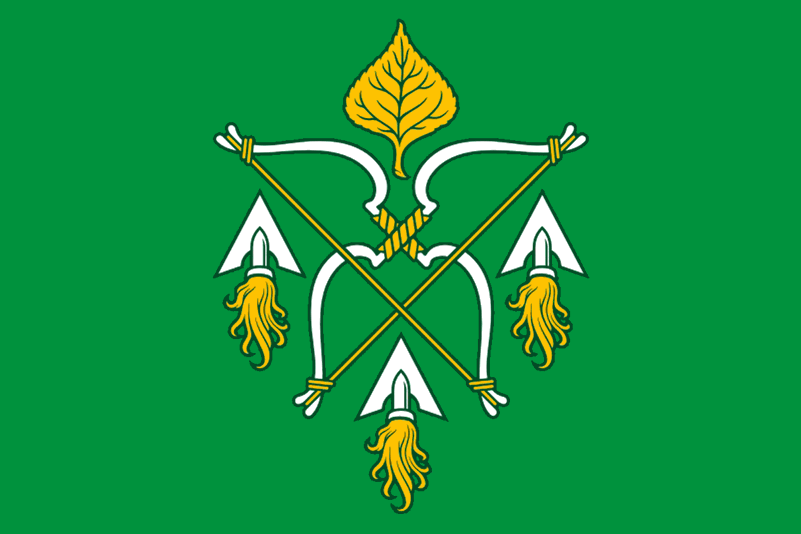
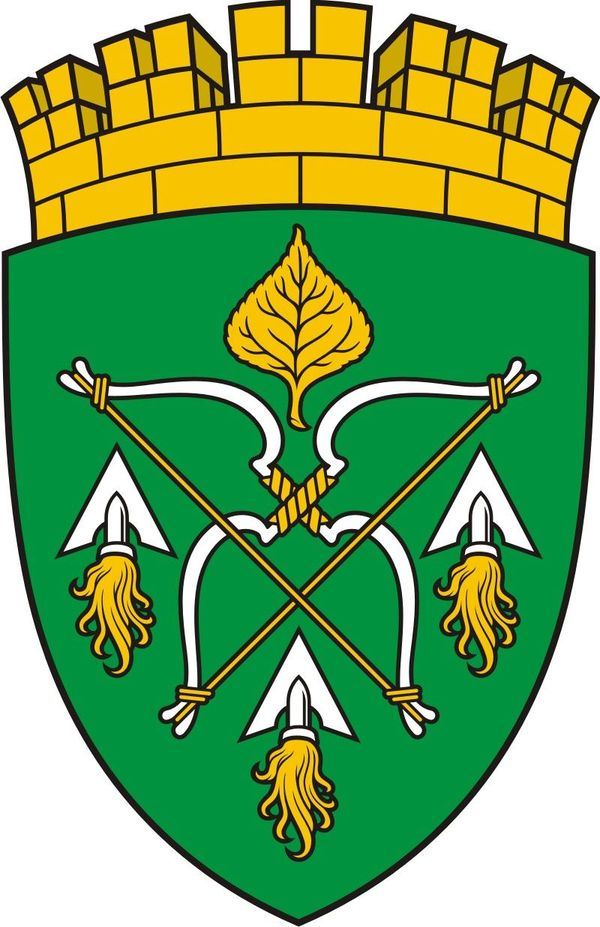
- Flag Coat of arms
- Interactive map of Sibirsky
- Location of Sibirsky Sibirsky (Altai Krai)
- Coordinates: 53°35′N 83°46′E
- Country: Russia
- Federal subject: Altai Krai
- Founded: 1980

Population (2010 Census)
  - Total: 11,306
  - Estimate (2025): 10,878 (−3.8%)

Administrative status
  - Subordinated to: closed administrative-territorial formation of Sibirsky
  - Capital of: closed administrative-territorial formation of Sibirsky

Municipal status
  - Urban okrug: Sibirsky Urban Okrug
  - Capital of: Sibirsky Urban Okrug
- Time zone: UTC+7 (MSK+4)
- Postal codes: 658075, 658076
- OKTMO ID: 01755000051

Sibirsky population
- 2010 Census: 11,306
- 2002 Census: 12,046

Sibirsky (Russian: Сиби́рский) is a closed rural locality (ZATO) in Altai Krai, Russia, located 44 kilometers (27 mi) from Barnaul, the administrative center of the Krai. As of the 2010 Census, its population was 11,306.

Sibirsky is home to the 35th Red Banner Order of Kutuzov and Alexander Nevsky Rocket Division of the Strategic Missile Troops.

The status of ZATO was given by a decree of the President of the Russian Federation on November 23, 1995.

== History ==
Historical affiliations

Union of Soviet Socialist Republics 1979–1991
(Russia) Russian Federation 1991–present

The history of the settlement begins in 1979, when the commander-in-chief of the rocket forces, at that time, General of the Army, and then Chief Marshal of Artillery, ⁣ Vladimir Fedorovich Tolubko, decided to deploy a military facility near Tsaplino station. Construction began in 1980; the first inhabitants lived in trailers and tents. In 1982, work was carried out on the construction of residential buildings, as well as barracks and special structures, in order for the first missile regiment to be put on duty in a timely fashion. On November 3, 1982, the first house was built for the officers of the first regiment at Victory Street, 6.

Within the framework of administrative divisions, it is incorporated as the closed administrative-territorial formation of Sibirsky—an administrative unit with the status equal to that of the districts, created in 2005. As a municipal division, the closed administrative-territorial formation of Sibirsky is incorporated as Sibirsky Urban Okrug. The urban designation has only been given because it is the federal law requirement for municipally incorporating closed inhabited localities.
