= Aleysk =

Town in Altai Krai, Russia

Aleysk Алейск
- Town
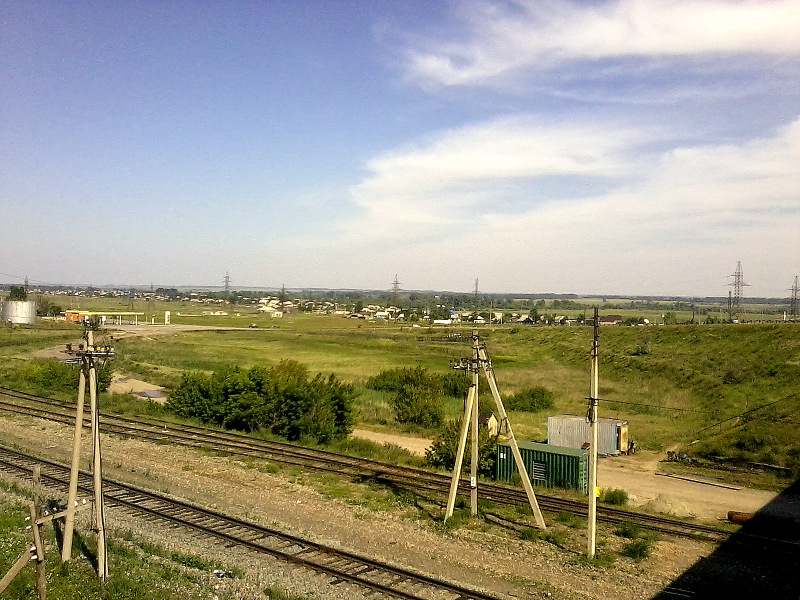

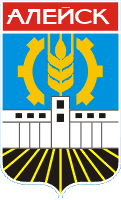
- Coat of arms
- Interactive map of Aleysk
- Location of Aleysk Aleysk (Altai Krai)
- Coordinates: 52°30′N 82°47′E
- Country: Russia
- Federal subject: Altai Krai
- Founded: 1913
- Elevation: 170 m (560 ft)

Population (2010 Census)
  - Total: 29,510
  - Estimate (2021): 25,380 (−14%)

Administrative status
  - Subordinated to: town of krai significance of Aleysk
  - Capital of: town of krai significance of Aleysk, Aleysky District

Municipal status
  - Urban okrug: Aleysk Urban Okrug
  - Capital of: Aleysk Urban Okrug, Aleysky Municipal District
- Time zone: UTC+7 (MSK+4)
- Postal code: 658130–658149
- OKTMO ID: 01703000001

Aleysk (Russian: Але́йск) is a town in Altai Krai, Russia, located on the Aley River (Ob's tributary), 120 kilometers (75 mi) southwest of Barnaul. Population: 29,510 (2010 census); 28,551 (2002 census); 30,309 (1989 Soviet census); 32,000 (1968).

== Administrative and municipal status ==
Within the framework of administrative divisions, Aleysk serves as the administrative center of Aleysky District, even though it is not a part of it. As an administrative division, it is incorporated separately as the town of krai significance of Aleysk—an administrative unit with the status equal to that of the districts. As a municipal division, the town of krai significance of Aleysk is incorporated as Aleysk Urban Okrug.

== Military ==
The town was host to Aleysk air base, and a division of the Strategic Rocket Forces, the 41st Guards Rocket Division. Currently the 35th Separate Guards Motor Rifle Brigade of the 41st Combined Arms Army, Central Military District is located in Aleysk.
