= 29th Guards Rocket Division =

Rocket army of the Soviet Union

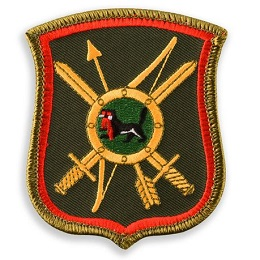
- Active: 1960–present
- Country: Soviet Union (1960–1991); Russia (1991–present)
- Branch: Strategic Rocket Forces
- Part of: 33rd Guards Rocket Army
- Garrison/HQ: Irkutsk, Irkutsk Oblast
- Decorations: Order of the Red Banner; Order of Lenin

Commanders
- Current commander: Colonel Yuri M. Sytnik

The 29th Guards Vitebsk Order of Lenin Red Banner Rocket Division is an intercontinental ballistic missile division of the Russian Strategic Rocket Forces. The division was formerly part of the Soviet Strategic Rocket Forces and has been active since 1960. Originally based in Latvia and Lithuania, the division has been stationed at Irkutsk since 1986. Its Military Unit Number is 59968 (42341 while stationed in the baltics)

== History ==
It was part of the 50th Rocket Army from 1960 to 1986, and included the Plokštinė missile base, operated by the 79th Guards Missile Regiment. The division inherited its honours and awards from the disbanding 51st Guards Motor Rifle Division.

The division was established on the basis of the 85th Engineer Brigade RVGK (established in 1951 as a 54th Brigade of Special Designation RVGK) and the personnel of the 51st Guards Motor Rifle Vitebsk Division of the Order of Lenin Red, which was disbanded in accordance with the directive of the Commander of the Baltic Military District No. 006471 dated May 5, 1960.

In July 1960, RVGK engineer brigades were reformed into missile divisions, and engineering regiments became missile regiments.

On October 17, 1961, the 29th RD was given the fighting banner of the 51st Guards Rifle Division, and the division received the name "29th Guards Missile Vitebsk Division of the Order of the Red Banner of Lenin."

Date of the annual holiday – July 1 (last day of the formation of 54th Brigade Special Purpose RVGK in 1952).

In September 1960 the division became part of the 50th Rocket Army, formed on the basis of the 50th Air Army, Long Range Aviation, of the Soviet Air Force.

Division Headquarters was deployed from July 1960 to September–October 1961 in Tauragė, Lithuanian SSR, and then from September–October 1961 to December 1985 in the city of Šiauliai, Lithuanian SSR.

On 1 February 1986, a Directive No. 432/3/00846 RVSN Commander of 3 December 1985, the division moved to Irkutsk, in the 53rd Rocket Army, comprising five missile regiments equipped with the 15P653 "Pioneer UTTH" MRBM. However, in connection with the INF Treaty between the USSR and the U.S., these missiles were not placed on alert. In May 1988, for duty in the division atonement first missile regiment with RT-2PM Topol intercontinental ballistic missiles.

On September 16, 2002, after the dissolution of the 53rd Rocket Army, the division was transferred to the 33rd Guards Rocket Army.

== Commanders ==
Commanders of the 29th Guards Rocket Division
No.	Name	From	To
1	Major General Aleksander A. Kolesov	1960	1963
2	Major General Leonid I. Kokich	1963	1970
3	Major General Vilhelm P. Glukhovsky	1970	1975
4	Major General Gennady F. Yergiskovsky	1975	1983
5	Major General Vyacheslav K. Tonkikh	1983	1987
6	Colonel Viktor N. Lazarev	1987	1990
7	Major General Viktor V. Dremov	1990	1994
8	Major General Vladimir N. Gontarenko	1994	1999
9	Major General Vladimir V. Antsiferov	1999	2004
10	Major General Sergei V. Siver	2004	2006
11	Major General Anatoly G. Kulay	2006	2010
12	Colonel Stenkin	2010	2010
13	Major General Vitaly V. Golovach	2010	2015
14	Colonel Yuri M. Sytnik	2015	present
