= Sergey Karakayev =

Russian general (born 1961)

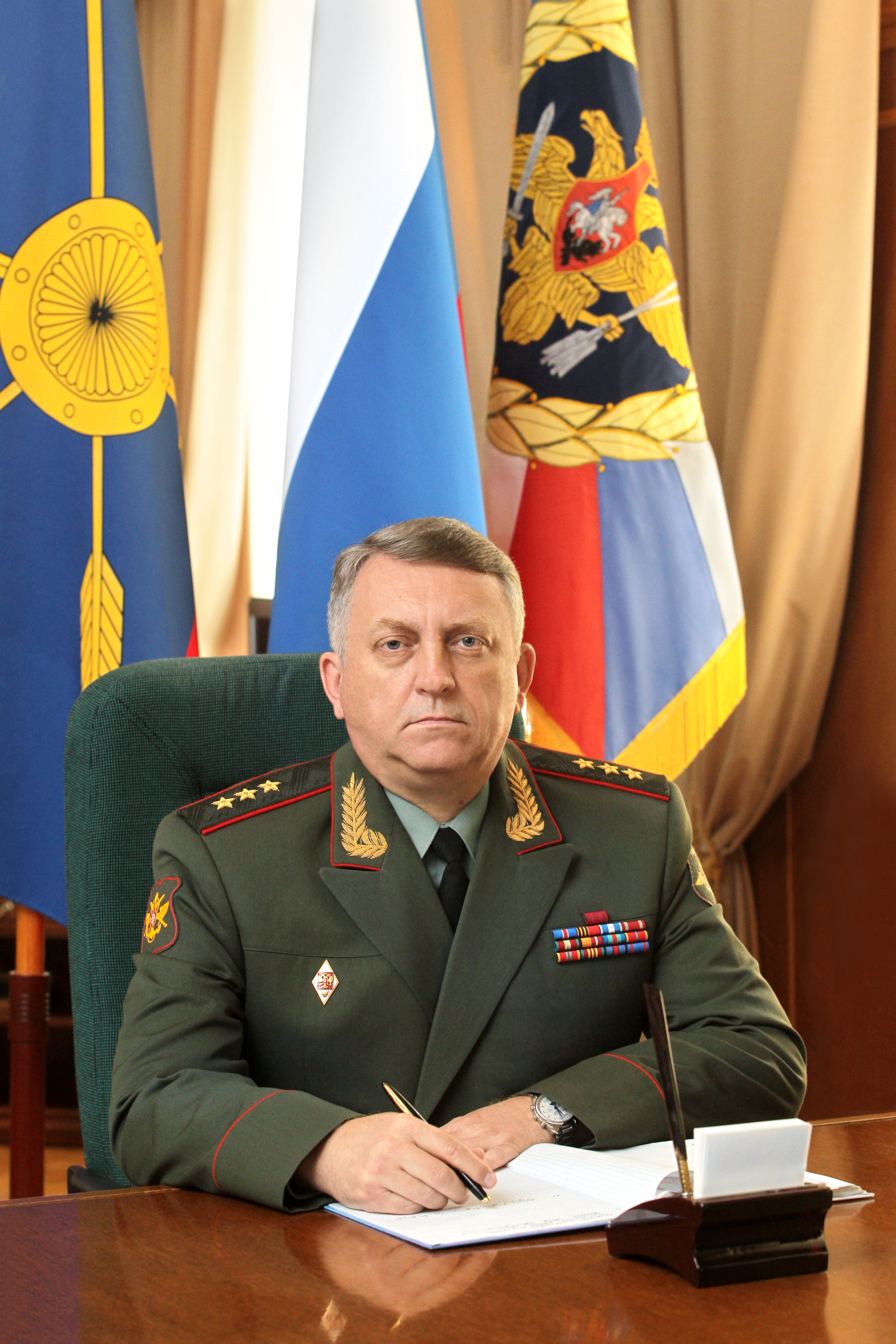
- Official portrait, 2012
- Born: 4 June 1961 (age 64); Ivano-Slyusarevka, Krasnodar Krai, Russian SFSR, Soviet Union
- Allegiance: Soviet Union (to 1991); Russia
- Branch: Strategic Rocket Forces
- Service years: 1983–present
- Rank: Colonel General
- Commands: Commander of the Strategic Rocket Forces; 27th Guards Rocket Army; 28th Guards Rocket Division
- Alma mater: Rostov Higher Military Command-Engineering School; Dzerzhinsky Military Academy; Military Academy of the General Staff of the Armed Forces of Russia

Colonel General Sergey Viktorovich Karakayev (Russian: Сергей Викторович Каракаев, born 4 June 1961) is a Russian military officer who has been the commander of the Strategic Rocket Forces since 2010.

== Early life and education ==
Karakayev was born on 4 June 1961 in the Krasnodar Krai, Russian SFSR, Soviet Union. His military education includes graduating from the Rostov Higher Military Command-Engineering School in 1983, the Dzerzhinsky Military Academy in 1994, and the General Staff Academy in 2009.

== Military career ==
Karakayev held command roles at every level of the Strategic Rocket Forces, and began his service in the 320th Missile Regiment of the 7th Guards Rocket Division.

His senior commands included the 27th Guards Rocket Army from 2006 to 2008, the chief of staff and First Deputy Commander of the Strategic Rocket Forces from 22 October 2009, and the commander of the Strategic Rocket Forces from 22 June 2010.

== Awards ==
- Order "For Merit to the Fatherland" 2nd, 3rd, and 4th classes
- Order of Military Merit

Military offices
Preceded by Vasily Karavaitsev	Commander of the 28th Guards Rocket Division; 1998–2001	Succeeded by Viktor Fyodorov
Preceded by Vladimir Gagarin	Commander of the 27th Guards Rocket Army; 2006–2008	Succeeded by Sergey Siver
Preceded by Andrey Shvaichenko	Chief of Staff and First Deputy Commander of the Strategic Rocket Forces; 2009–2010	Succeeded by Ivan Reva
Preceded by Andrey Shvaichenko	Commander of the Strategic Rocket Forces; 2010–present	Incumbent
