= Borovikha =

Borovikha Боровиха
- Selo
- Location within Altai Krai Location within Russia
- Coordinates: 53°30′N 83°50′E
- Country: Russia
- Region: Altai Krai
- District: Pervomaysky District
- Time zone: UTC+7:00

Borovikha (Russian: Боровиха) is a rural locality (a selo) and the administrative center of Borovikhinsky Selsoviet, Pervomaysky District, Altai Krai, Russia. The population was 7,507 as of 2013. There are 59 streets.

== Geography ==
Borovikha is located 19 km north of Novoaltaysk (the district's administrative centre) by road. Zudilovo is the nearest rural locality.
