= 41st Guards Rocket Division =

ICBM division of the Soviet & Russian Strategic Rocket Forces

68th Anti-Aircraft Artillery Division (8 October 1943–17 March 1945) 6th Guards Anti-Aircraft Artillery Division (17 March 1945–20 March 1958) 138th Guards Anti-Aircraft Artillery Brigade (20 March 1958–1 August 1960) 41st Guards Rocket Division (29 April 1961–1 December 2001)
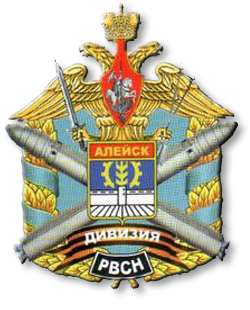
- Emblem of the 41st Guards Rocket Division
- Active: 1943–1960; 1961–2001
- Country: Soviet Union (1943-1991); Russia (1991-2001)
- Branch: Red Army (Soviet Army from 1946); Strategic Rocket Forces (from 1961)
- Type: Division
- Role: Air defense (1943–1960); Intercontinental ballistic missile (1961–2001)
- Part of: 33rd Guards Rocket Army (1970–2001)
- Garrison/HQ: Aleysk (1964–2001)
- Anniversaries: 11 June (formation)
- Engagements: World War II
- Decorations: Order of Kutuzov; Order of Bogdan Khmelnitsky 2nd class
- Battle honours: Lvov; Berlin

The 41st Guards Rocket Division (Russian: 41-я гвардейская ракетная дивизия) was a division of the Soviet and Russian Strategic Rocket Forces, active from 1961 to 2001.

The division traced its lineage to the formation of the Red Army's 68th Anti-Aircraft (AA) Artillery Division during World War II in October 1943. The 68th Division was assigned to the 38th Army, directly subordinated to the 1st Ukrainian Front, and assigned to the 4th Tank Army (later the 4th Guards Tank Army) for the duration of its combat service, which began in April 1944. The division provided air defense and artillery support to ground troops, and fought in the Lvov–Sandomierz Offensive, the Vistula–Oder Offensive, the Silesian Offensives, the Berlin Offensive, and the Prague Offensive. In March 1945 it became the 6th Guards Anti-Aircraft Artillery Division, and for its actions during the war the division received the honorifics Berlin and Lvov and was awarded the Order of Bogdan Khmelnitsky 2nd class and the Order of Kutuzov 2nd class. In the postwar period the division continued to serve with the 4th Guards Tank Army in Czechoslovakia, Hungary, and East Germany. In 1958 it was redesignated as the 138th Guards Anti-Aircraft Artillery Brigade. It was withdrawn to the Soviet Union two years later and disbanded.

In 1961 its heritage was transferred to the Strategic Rocket Forces' 41st Guards Rocket Division, recently expanded from the 216th Rocket Brigade at Tyumen. The division relocated to Aleysk in 1964, and operated intercontinental ballistic missiles from there as part of the 33rd Guards Rocket Army. In 2001 it was disbanded in accordance with the Strategic Arms Reduction Treaty.

== World War II ==
The 68th Anti-Aircraft Artillery Division of the Reserve of the Supreme High Command (RVGK) was formed in the village of Akhuny, Penza Oblast from 8 October to 1 December 1943 at the Penza Anti-Aircraft Artillery Training Camp, part of the Volga Military District. It included the 1995th, 1999th, and 2003rd Anti-Aircraft Artillery Regiments with small-caliber AA guns and the 2007th Anti-Aircraft Artillery Regiment with medium-caliber AA guns, under the command of Colonel Alexander Kozlov. The 68th trained in the Moscow Military District until April 1944, and departed for the front on 9 April. Upon its arrival at the front on 27 April, the division became part of the 1st Ukrainian Front's 38th Army. It would serve with the front for the duration of the war. On 30 April, the 68th saw its first action, covering a crossing and a railway bridge across the Dniester near Zalishchyky. In July and August, it fought in the Lvov–Sandomierz Offensive, the Soviet advance from western Ukraine into eastern Poland, claiming 29 aircraft downed in cooperation with fighters from the 2nd Air Army. The 68th was directly subordinated to the front from July. For its actions in the capture of Lvov, the division received the honorific Lvov on 25 August. In September it was transferred to the 4th Tank Army (the 4th Guards Tank Army from 17 March 1945).

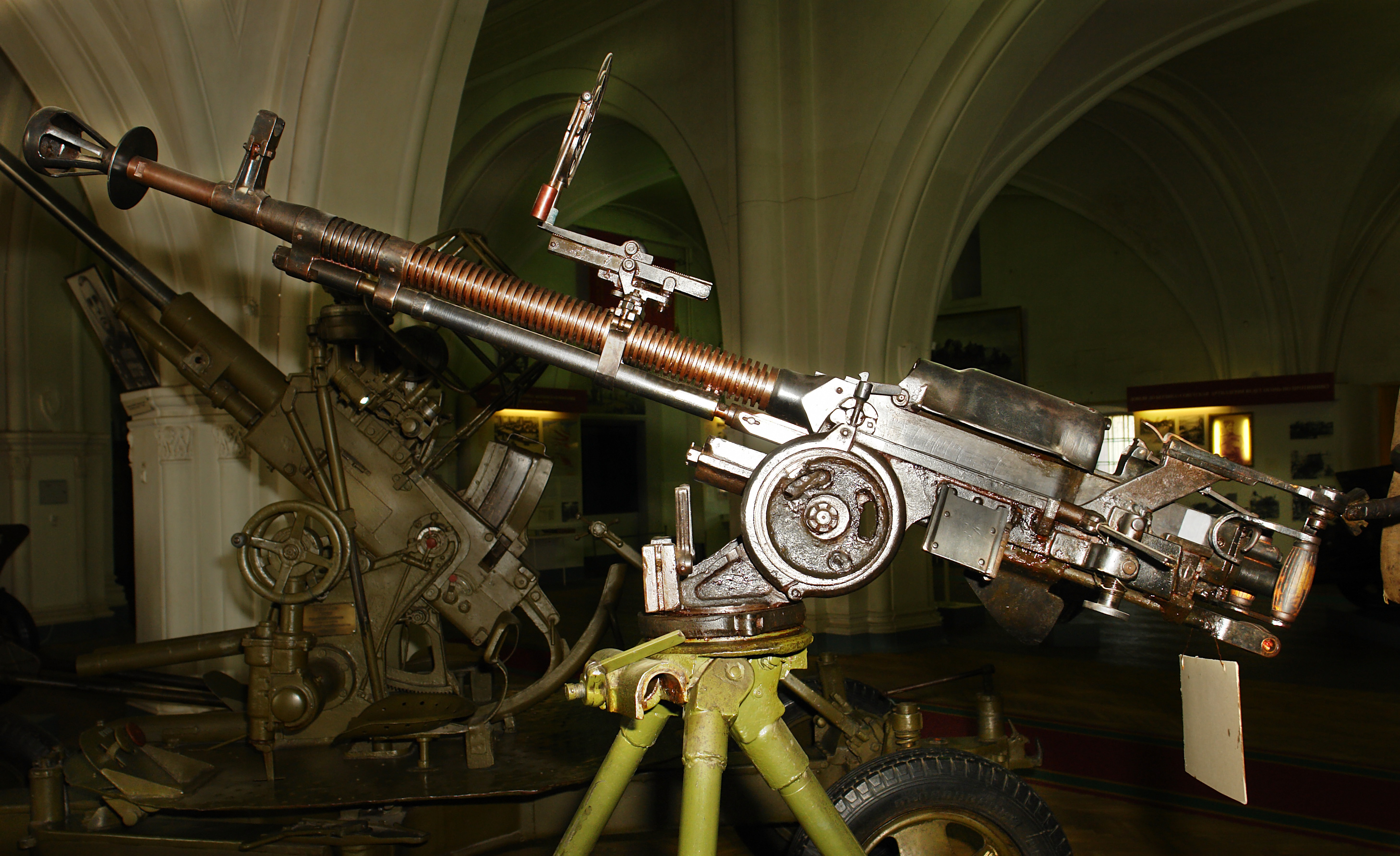
Brusov's DShK machine gun, displayed in the Military Historical Museum of Artillery, Engineers and Signal Corps

In January–February 1945, the division provided air defense to the army during the Sandomierz–Silesian Offensive, part of the larger Vistula–Oder Strategic Offensive, in which the army advanced across Poland from the Sandomierz bridgehead to the Oder. On 15 January, near Kielce, according to Soviet reports, 1995th Regiment gunner Sergeant Nikolay Andryushok used his AA gun to repulse a German tank-supported infantry attack on his battery. Andryushok was awarded the title Hero of the Soviet Union for his actions. In operations on the Oder in late January, the 68th saw particularly fierce combat with German aviation, and 1995th Regiment AA gun commander Junior Sergeant Ivan Brusov was posthumously made a Hero of the Soviet Union for his actions on 25 January, which were described by Soviet reports as shooting down multiple German aircraft conducting a bombing raid on a pontoon bridge over the Oder and continuing to fire despite being mortally wounded. Kozlov was killed in action on 12 February. For "exemplary fulfillment of command orders" during the Oder crossing, the division was awarded the Order of Bogdan Khmelnitsky, 2nd class, on 5 April. On 19 February, the 2007th and 2003rd Regiments received the honorific Kielce and the 1995th and 1999th the honorific Petrokov for their actions in the capture of the two cities.

In February–March, the 68th fought in the Lower Silesian Offensive and the Upper Silesian Offensive, during which German troops were cleared from Silesia. Colonel Nikolay Bogun became division commander on 16 February, and would command it until 3 October 1946. For its "determination, courage, and successful completion of combat missions", the division was redesignated as the 6th Guards Anti-Aircraft Artillery Division on 17 March, becoming part of the elite Soviet Guards. The 1995th, 1999th, 2003rd, and 2007th Regiments became the 431st, 432nd, 433rd, and 434th Guards Anti-Aircraft Artillery Regiments, respectively. During the Battle of Berlin, which began in mid-April, the division claimed 43 German aircraft in sixteen days of fighting. In early May, the 4th Guards Tank Army was pulled out of action in the Berlin Offensive and turned south towards Czechoslovakia, fighting in the Prague Offensive, its last combat action of the war. The four regiments of the 6th Guards were awarded the Order of Alexander Nevsky by a decree of the Presidium of the Supreme Soviet on 26 May for "exemplary fulfillment of command tasks" in the Berlin Offensive. On 4 June, the division received the honorific Berlin for its actions in the capture of that city and the Order of Kutuzov, 2nd class, for its actions in the Prague Offensive. During the war, the division was credited with shooting down 174 enemy aircraft, destroying 100 tanks and assault guns, 22 artillery and mortar batteries, killing over 4,600 German soldiers, and capturing 2,650. 910 soldiers were decorated, while two more, Brusov and Andryushok, were made Heroes of the Soviet Union.

== Postwar ==
At the end of the war, the 6th Guards Anti-Aircraft Artillery Division was stationed in Czechoslovakia in the area of Kladno. On 30 May, with the 4th Guards Tank Army, it was relocated to the area of Kőszeg in Hungary, where personnel from the division demobilized in October and November. In early June, with the army, the division was relocated to Chemnitz in East Germany, becoming part of the Group of Soviet Occupation Forces in Germany (the Group of Soviet Forces in Germany from 1954). Between 1949 and 1950 the division received reinforcements. On 20 March 1958, it was reorganized into the 138th Guards Anti-Aircraft Artillery Brigade. By 25 June 1960, the brigade was withdrawn to Tatishchevo in the Volga Military District, where it disbanded on 1 August. Its battle flag was transferred to the Central Armed Forces Museum.

=== Strategic Rocket Forces ===
With the introduction of intercontinental ballistic missiles into service beginning in 1959, the Strategic Rocket Forces (SRF) were formed to operate the missile launch facilities. In accordance with directives of the Soviet General Staff and the Chief of the Strategic Rocket Forces dated 4 July and 17 August 1959, respectively, the formation of a military unit with the Military Unit Number (MUN) 43189-"B" (a temporary designation) began in Tyumen, in the barracks of the recently disbanded 109th Guards Motor Rifle Division. Colonel Konstantin Glushich was appointed commander on 7 September. Personnel from the 10th Guards Gun Artillery Division of the Transcaucasian Military District, 109th Guards Motor Rifle Division, and graduates of the Caspian Higher Naval School were used to form the unit. The unit began training on 1 November, and on 11 June 1960, the formation of the 216th Rocket Brigade began from the temporary unit. Two days later, its MUN was changed to 34189, while Glushich continued as acting brigade commander. The brigade was formed from personnel of the 138th Guards Anti-Aircraft Artillery Brigade, the 81st Tank Regiment of the 36th Guards Motor Rifle Division, and Military unit 43189-"B". Its sixteen subunits were located in Tyumen, Yalutorovsk, Ishim, and at Andreyevsky Lager near Tyumen. The brigade's formation was completed on 30 November.

It was assigned to the 27th Artillery Range Administration by a directive from the Chief of the SRF dated 10 December 1960. In accordance with an SRF General Staff directive dated 13 April 1961, the brigade was reorganized into a division by 30 May. On 29 April, in order to preserve military traditions, the decorations and awards of the 138th Guards Anti-Aircraft Artillery Brigade were transferred to the division, which was redesignated the 41st Guards Lvov–Berlin Orders of Kutuzov and Bogdan Khmelnitsky Rocket Division. The annual day of the division was declared to be 11 June, the date of the formation of the 213th Rocket Brigade, by an order of 6 June. On 21 December it received the battle flag of the 138th Brigade.

On 15 August 1964, the 41st Guards was relocated to Aleysk, where the formation of additional rocket regiments and the construction of missile silos for its 8K67 ICBMs began. Construction was hampered by the frozen terrain, and the majority of the officers unfamiliar with missile operations had to be retrained. The division transferred from the 7th Separate Guards Rocket Corps to the 24th Separate Rocket Corps on 7 October 1965. On 31 December 1966, the 367th Rocket Regiment became the first regiment of the division to go on alert duty. The 300th Rocket Regiment went on alert duty on 2 September 1967, the 375th on 20 August 1968, the 268th on 26 September 1969, and the 73rd on 22 December 1970. In 1968, the 367th Regiment conducted a training missile launch on a training range. On 23 April 1970, the 41st Guards transferred to the 33rd Guards Rocket Army (formed from the 7th Separate Corps).

In 1979, the division was reequipped with updated 15A18 ICBMs and in 1983 it additionally received 15A14 ICBMs. During 2000 and 2001, the 41st Guards' missile silos were deactivated in accordance with the Strategic Arms Reduction Treaty. The silos were deactivated by the explosion of 3,000 anti-tank mines or three tons of high explosives per silo (sources differ), and the land was turned over to the local civilian authorities. The division was disbanded on 1 December 2001.

By 24 January 2002, Rossiyskaya Gazeta was reporting that the missiles had been destroyed. "Two to three tonnes" of explosive were used to destroy each silo. "For a long time" there was no decision on the future use of the empty military garrison, containing housing, a school, three kindergartens, a swimming pool, and "an enormous amount of equipment that was discarded outside the city limits." "The maintenance of these facilities turned out to be too expensive for the small city of Aleysk." But a decision was made "at the beginning of summer [mid-2001]." A motor rifle division of the Siberian Military District was to arrive to replace the SRF personnel.

=== Commanders ===
The 41st Guards was commanded by the following officers from 1961 to 2001:

- Major General Konstantin Glushich (1961–1969)
- Major General Mikhail Danilchenko (1969–1975)
- Major General Gennady Roshchin (1975–1976)
- Major General Dmitry Trubyuk (1976–1982)
- Major General Grigory Cherkesov (1982–1986)
- Major General Valery Ivanov (1986–1994)
- Major General Vladimir Sadovsky (1994–1998)
- Major General Yury Chernega (1998–2001)
