= 28th Guards Rocket Division =

28th Guards Red Banner Missile Division
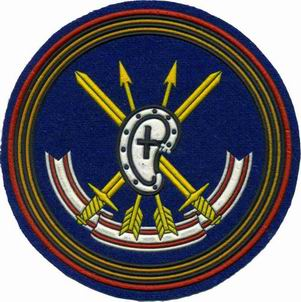
- Active: May 3, 1961
- Country: Soviet Union (1961–1991); Russia (1991–present)
- Branch: Strategic Rocket Forces
- Type: Missile division
- Part of: 27th Guards Missile Army
- Garrison/HQ: Kozelsk, Kaluga Oblast
- Decorations: Order of the Red Banner

Commanders
- Current commander: Colonel Valeriy V. Kasyanov

28th Guards Order of the Red Banner Missile Division (Russian: 28-я гвардейская ракетная Краснознамённая дивизия) is a missile division under command of the 27th Guards Missile Army of the Strategic Rocket Forces of Russia headquartered at Kozelsk in Kaluga Oblast.

== History ==
28th Guards Red Banner Missile Division was formed on May 3, 1961, on the base of 198th Engineer Missile Brigade. On August 4, the Division received its colors.

The first training launch (R-2 missile) was performed on August 18.

On May 30, 1964, two regiments armed with R-9 Desna ICBM were formed under command of the 28th Division. Between 1967 and 1969 eleven UR-100 regiments were formed.

On President's order one of the regiments received title Kaluga. On September 12, 2007, one of the regiments (07390) was disbanded.

There were plans to disband the entire division by 2010, but on November 5, 2008 President Dmitry Medvedev during his speech at the joint session of Russia's Parliament announced that the 28th Division will resume its mission.

In 2013, work began on the rearmament of 10 silos of the 28th Missile Division with the silo complex version of the RS-24 "Yars" which completed in 2018.

== Commanders ==
Commanders of the 28th Guards Rocket Brigade
No.	Name	From	To
1	Major General Mikhail S. Burmak	1961	1967
2	Major General Vasiliy M. Barabanshikov	1967	1975
3	Major General Vladimir A. Generalov	1975	1977
4	Major General Vladimir M. Timofeyev	1977	1980
5	Major General Vladimir I. Petrov	1980	1986
6	Major General Dmitry N. Bolshakov	1986	1992
7	Major General Boris A. Polyakov	1992	1995
8	Major General Vasiliy G. Karavaytsev	1995	1998
9	Major General Sergey V. Karakayev	1998	2001
10	Major General Victor A. Fyodorov	2001	2004
11	Major General Oleg G. Antsiferov	2004	2009
12	Colonel Edward E. Stefantsov	2009	2013
13	Colonel Valeriy V. Kasyanov	February 27 2013	present

== Equipment ==
In 1961-1964, the 28th Division received 15 R-9 Desna ICBM launchers, including 6 silos.

In 1967, the first (out of 11) UR-100 regiment was formed.

By 1978, 6 out of 11 UR-100 regiments received modified UR-100N (US DOD: SS-19 Stiletto) missiles. As of 2010, UR-100N remained the only ICBM in service with the division.

Rearmament of the Division with 30 new RS-24 Yars missiles was completed in December 2025.
