= Sergey Biryuzov =

Soviet military commander (1904–1964)

- Born: 21 August 1904; Skopin, Russian Empire
- Died: 19 October 1964 (aged 60) near Belgrade, Yugoslavia
- Burial place: Kremlin Wall Necropolis
- Military career
- Allegiance: Soviet Union
- Branch: Red Army
- Service years: 1922–1964
- Rank: Marshal of the Soviet Union (1955–1964)
- Commands: 37th Army; Soviet Air Defence Forces; Strategic Missile Troops
- Conflicts: World War II; Cuban Missile Crisis
- Awards: Hero of the Soviet Union; Order of Lenin (5); People's Hero of Yugoslavia; Order of the Red Banner (3); Order of Suvorov; Order of Kutuzov (2); Order of Bogdan Khmelnitsky

Sergey Semyonovich Biryuzov (Russian: Серге́й Семёнович Бирюзо́в; 21 August 1904 – 19 October 1964) was a Marshal of the Soviet Union and Chief of the General Staff.

== Early life and prewar service ==
Biryuzov was born in Skopin, in the Ryazan Governorate of the Russian Empire, in a working-class family of Russian ethnicity. He joined the Red Army in September 1922, studying at the 48th Rostov Infantry and Machine Gun and the 10th Vladikavkaz Courses in the North Caucasus Military District before transferring to the VTsIK Combined Military School in Moscow in October 1923. After graduating from the latter, Biryuzov returned to the North Caucasus Military District in September 1926 to command a platoon of the 65th Rifle Regiment of the 22nd Rifle Division. In the same year he became a member of the Communist Party of the Soviet Union. From December 1929 he served as commander of an airfield company of the 36th Aircraft Fleet in the district.

After completing studies at the Military Faculty of the Moscow Zootechnical Institute between June 1930 and February 1931, Biryuzov served with the 3rd Rifle Regiment of the Moscow Proletarian Rifle Division, rising from company commander to chief of staff of the training battalion to rifle battalion commander during his service with the regiment. Entering the Frunze Military Academy in June 1934, Biryuzov became chief of staff of the 30th Rifle Division following his graduation in October 1937. He was acting division commander until February 1938 and in April of that year became chief of the operations department Kharkov Military District staff. Biryuzov held this position until August 1939, when he became the commanding officer of the 132nd Rifle Division.

== World War II ==
Biryuzov commanded this unit until October 15, 1941 when he was wounded, and returned to it from February 17 to April 17, 1942. Biryuzov's division was a part of Western, Southwestern, and Bryansk Fronts. Biryuzov was a fine division commander, often leading his division personally into battle. Within the first year of Operation Barbarossa (June 1941), Biryuzov had been wounded five times, two times rather severely. In April 1942, he was made the Chief of Staff of the 48th Army, which was a part of Bryansk Front. He commanded this unit until November 1942, when he was made the Chief of Staff of the 2nd Guards Army. He was in this position until April 1943, helping to lead this unit during Operation Saturn, when 2nd Guards Army helped crush the German 6th Army after the Germans had been surrounded during the Battle of Stalingrad.

In April 1943, he was made the Chief of Staff of the Southern Front, where he was a valuable aide to the Southern Front commander, Fyodor Tolbukhin. On October 20, 1943, Southern Front was renamed 4th Ukrainian Front. Biryuzov remained the Chief of Staff until May 1944 when he was transferred to 3rd Ukrainian Front, along with Tolbukhin. In October 1944, Biryuzov was transferred to command the 37th Army, which was a part of 3rd Ukrainian Front. He held this position through the end of the war, until May 1945. In these command positions, Biriuzov helped plan and carry out the expulsion of all German forces from Ukraine, and then helped plan and carry out the liberation of Bulgaria and Yugoslavia.

== Cold War ==
After these commands, Biryuzov was made the Head of the Soviet Military Mission in Bulgaria, a position he held until May 1946, when he became deputy commander-in-chief of the Ground Forces for combat training. Between June 1947 and April 1953, he commanded the Primorsky Military District, then became first deputy commander-in-chief of the Far Eastern Military District when the Primorsky Military District was merged into the latter. Two months later, Biryuzov was sent west to become commander-in-chief of the Central Group of Forces. He assumed a series of senior positions in the Soviet Air Defense Forces beginning in May 1954 when he became first deputy commander-in-chief of the forces. On March 11, 1955, Biryuzov was given the rank of Marshal of the Soviet Union. Between April 1955 and April 1962, Biryuzov was the Commander in Chief of the Soviet Air Defense Forces. After nearly a year as Commander in Chief of the Strategic Missile Force, he was made the Chief of the General Staff in March 1963.

== Death ==
On October 19, 1964, Biryuzov and 32 others were killed when their Ilyushin Il-18 crashed against Mount Avala near Belgrade. They were en route to the celebration of the 20th anniversary of Belgrade's liberation. President Josip Broz Tito posthumously awarded Biryuzov (who participated in the liberation of Yugoslavia and subsequently died there) the Order of the People's Hero. The urn containing his ashes is buried in the Kremlin.

== Awards ==
His awards include:

Soviet Union

Hero of the Soviet Union (1 February 1948)
Order of Lenin, five times (27 March 1942, 6 November 1947, 20 August 1954, 1 February 1958, 20 August 1964)
Order of the Red Banner, three times (13 September 1944, 3 November 1944, 20 April 1953)
Order of Suvorov, 1st class (16 May 1944)
Order of Suvorov, 2nd class (31 March 1944)
Order of Kutuzov, 1st class (17 September 1943)
Order of Bogdan Khmelnitsky, 1st class (19 March 1944)
Medal "For the Defence of Stalingrad" (1942)
Medal "For the Liberation of Belgrade" (1945)
Medal "For the Victory over Germany in the Great Patriotic War 1941–1945" (1945)
Jubilee Medal "30 Years of the Soviet Army and Navy" (1948)
Jubilee Medal "40 Years of the Armed Forces of the USSR" (1958)

Foreign

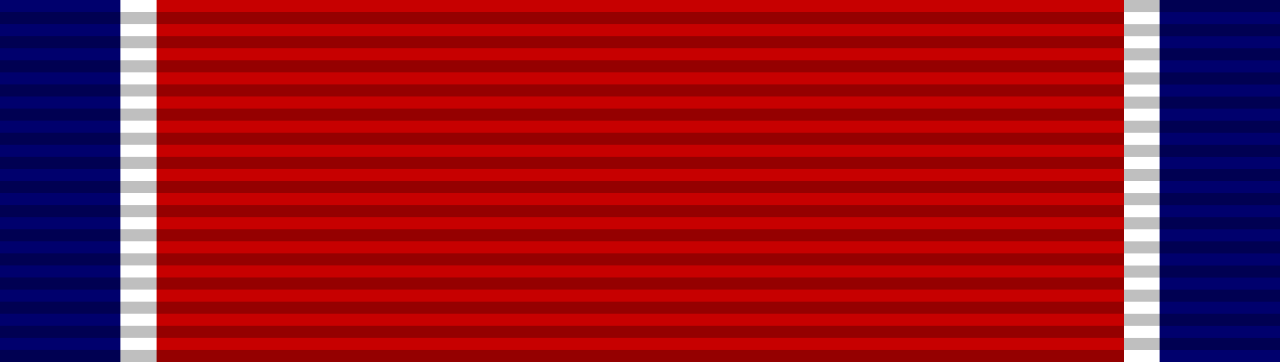
Order of Georgi Dimitrov (People's Republic of Bulgaria)
Unknown medal (People's Republic of Bulgaria)
Order of Saint Alexander, 1st class with swords (Kingdom of Bulgaria)
Grand Cross of the Order of Saint Alexander (Kingdom of Bulgaria)
Order of Saint Alexander, 1st class (Kingdom of Bulgaria)
Grand Cross of the Order of Saint Alexander, 1st class with swords (Kingdom of Bulgaria)
Medal of Sino-Soviet Friendship, twice (China)
Order of the National Flag, 1st class (North Korea)
Medal for the Liberation of Korea (North Korea)
Order of the People's Hero (posthumously) (Yugoslavia)
Order of the Partisan Star, 1st class (Yugoslavia)
Order of Brotherhood and Unity, 1st Class (Yugoslavia)

Military offices
Preceded by Matvei Zakharov	Chief of the General Staff of the Armed Forces of the Soviet Union; March 1963 – November 1964	Succeeded by Matvei Zakharov
