= 33rd Guards Rocket Army =

33rd Guards Berislav-Khingan Twice Red Banner Order of Suvorov Rocket Army
- Active: 1970–present
- Country: Soviet Union (1970–1991); Russia (1991–present)
- Branch: Strategic Rocket Forces
- Type: Rocket army
- Headquarters: Omsk
- Decorations: Order of the Red Banner (2); Order of Suvorov
- Honorifics: Berislav; Khingan

Commanders
- Current commander: Major General (Guards) Vladimir Viktorovich Kvashin

33rd Guards Berislav-Khingan Twice Red Banner Order of Suvorov Rocket Army (Russian: 33-я гвардейская ракетная Бериславско-Хинганская дважды Краснознамённая, ордена Суворова армия) is one of the three rocket armies that exist today within the Russian Strategic Rocket Forces. It is headquartered at Omsk in Southwestern Siberia.

The 33rd Guards Rocket Army was formed in April 1970 from the 7th Separate Guards Berislav Twice Red Banner Order of Suvorov Rocket Corps, which inherited the honors of the 109th Guards Rifle Division.

== Composition ==
In 1971, the army comprised the 36th Guards Rocket Division (Krasnoyarsk, Krasnoyarsk Kray); the 39th Guards Rocket Division (Pashino, Novosibirsk Oblast); the 41st Guards Rocket Division (Aleysk, Altai Kray); the 57th Rocket Division (Zhangiz Tobe, Semipalatinsk Oblast); the 62nd Rocket Division (Uzhur, Krasnoyarsk Kray); the 93rd Rocket Brigade (Tyumen, Tyumen Oblast); the 97th Rocket Brigade (Itatka, Tomsk Oblast); and the 290th Independent Rocket Regiment (Omsk, Omsk Oblast). The 290th Independent Rocket Regiment and the 93rd Rocket Brigade were disbanded in 1976.

The 35th Rocket Division became attached to the Army in 1981.

There are four rocket divisions that were in 2009 under command of the 33rd Army:

- 62nd Rocket Division
- 39th Guards Rocket Division
- 35th Rocket Division
- 29th Guards Rocket Division

From 1993 to 1996 the 38th Rocket Division at Derzhavinsk, Turgay Oblast, Kazakhstan was under the control of the 33rd Guards Rocket Army.

From 16 September 2002 to 2007, the 23rd Guards Orlovsko-Berlinskaya Order of Lenin Red Banner Rocket Division (Military Unit Number 21201) was under the command of the 33rd Army.

== Equipment ==
The 33rd Army is equipped with R-36M2 and RT-2PM Topol intercontinental ballistic missiles.

== Commanders ==
- 27 June 1970 – 12 June 1977: Lieutenant General Alexandr I. Khlopov
- 12 June 1977 – 21 April 1980: Major General Viktor M. Yegorov
- 21 April 1980 – 12 June 1984: Lieutenant General Stanislav G. Kochemasov
- 12 June 1984 – 6 January 1989: Lieutenant General Yuri I. Plotnikov
- 6 January 1989 – 20 May 1993: Lieutenant General Vitaly V. Moroz
- 20 May 1993 – 14 August 1995: Lieutenant General Alexey A. Kasyanov
- 14 August 1995 – 14 May 2002: Lieutenant General Alexandr L. Konarev
- 14 May 2002 –16 June 2006: Lieutenant General Andrey A. Shvaichenko
- 16 June 2006 – 2010: Lieutenant General Gennady Privalov
- 2010–March 2017: Major General (promoted to Lieutenant General 2013) Aleksandr Ponomarenko
- 9 March 2017–July 2020: Major General (promoted to Lieutenant General 2019) Igor Afonin
- July 2020–March 2021: Major General Oleg Glazunov
- since 2021: Major General (Guards) Vladimir Viktorovich Kvashin
