= Vladimir Muravyov (general) =

Soviet and Russian military officer (1938–2020)

- Native name: Владимир Александрович Муравьёв
- Born: 2 October 1938; Dyatlovka, Moscow Oblast, Russian SFSR, Soviet Union
- Died: 21 January 2020 (aged 81)
- Buried: Troyekurovskoye Cemetery
- Allegiance: Soviet Union; Russia
- Branch: Strategic Missile Forces
- Service years: 1955–2000
- Rank: Colonel-general
- Commands: 49th Guards Rocket Division; 53rd Rocket Army
- Awards: Order of Military Merit; Order of the Red Star; Order of the Badge of Honour; Order "For Service to the Homeland in the Armed Forces of the USSR", 3rd class

Vladimir Aleksandrovich Muravyov (Russian: Владимир Александрович Муравьёв; 2 October 1938 – 21 January 2020) was a Soviet and Russian military officer who held a number of posts in the Soviet and later Russian Armed Forces, reaching the rank of colonel-general.

Born in 1938, Muravyov entered the Soviet Armed Forces in 1955 and after his initial studies, began a career in the Strategic Missile Forces. He rose through the ranks and posts to serve as chief engineer and then deputy commander of a rocket regiment. After graduating from the F. E. Dzerzhinsky Military Academy he took command of a rocket regiment and was soon promoted to chief of staff and deputy commander of a rocket division. In 1978 he became commander of the 49th Guards Rocket Division and oversaw the introduction of the RSD-10 Pioneer intermediate-range ballistic missile system. In 1984 he was appointed first deputy commander of the 50th Rocket Army, and in 1987 commander of the 53rd Rocket Army. Muravyov continued to be heavily involved in the introduction of the latest missile technologies, with the deployment of the RT-2PM Topol mobile intercontinental ballistic missile system.

In 1992 Muravyov took on a leadership role with the Strategic Missile Forces, becoming head of its Combat Training Directorate, and from 1993 deputy commander of the Strategic Missile Forces. In 1997 he became First Deputy Commander-in-Chief of the Strategic Missile Forces, and was also a member of its military council. In 2000 Muravyov reached the age limit for active service and retired. He remained active in veteran's affairs and academic studies, researching at the Peter the Great Military Academy of the Strategic Missile Forces, and becoming a candidate of military sciences. He had received awards from both the Soviet and Russian governments prior to his death in 2020.

== Early service ==
Muravyov was born into the family of an officer of the Red Army on 2 October 1938 in the village of Dyatlovka, Moscow Oblast, then part of the Russian SFSR, in the Soviet Union. He joined the Soviet Armed Forces in August 1955, and graduated from the Kharkov Higher Military Command-Engineering School in 1960. He was assigned to serve with the Strategic Missile Forces as part of a missile division based in Pruzhany, Brest Region in July that year. He was initially head of the 3rd department of the 6th battery of the 403rd Rocket Regiment from 1960 to 1963, and then worked in the engineering sections of the Missile Forces from 1963 to 1969. He returned to the 403rd Rocket Regiment in 1969 as its chief engineer, serving as such until 1972. He was then deputy commander of the 56th Rocket Regiment until 1973. After carrying out further studies at the F. E. Dzerzhinsky Military Academy from 1973, and graduating with a gold medal in June 1975, Muravyov was appointed commander of the 306th Rocket Regiment. In November 1976 he became chief of staff and deputy commander of the 24th Guards Rocket Division, based at Gvardeysk, Kaliningrad Oblast.

== Command postings ==
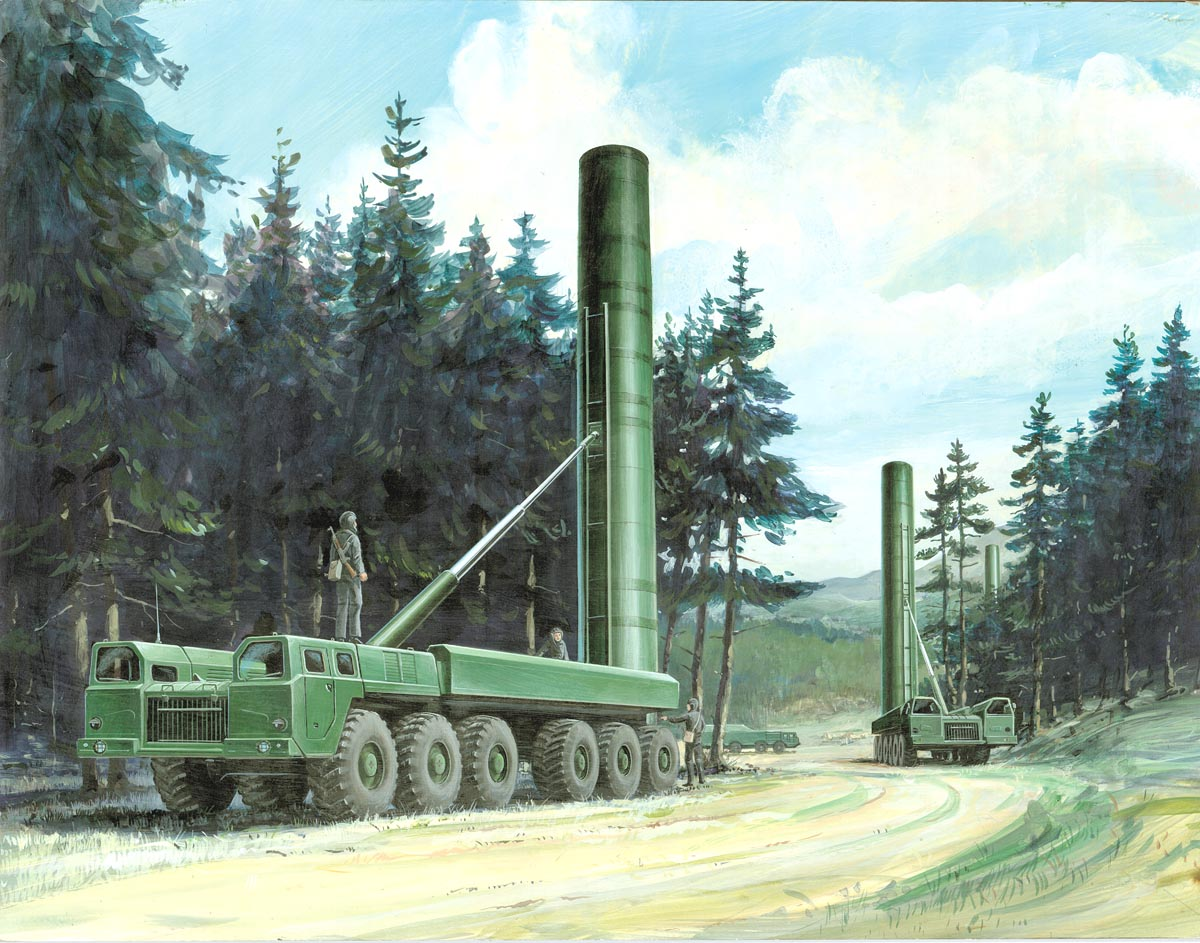
Depiction of deployed RSD-10 Pioneer missile launchers. Muravyov oversaw the equipping of the 49th Guards Rocket Division with these units during his time in command.

From August 1978 Muravyov was commander of the 49th Guards Rocket Division, at Lida, Grodno Region. During his time in command, the 49th Guards Rocket Division was equipped with the RSD-10 Pioneer intermediate-range ballistic missile system, replacing the R-12 Dvina. In October 1979 the division was inspected by Colonel General Mikhail Grigoryevich Grigoryev, the first deputy commander of the Strategic Missile Forces, and was rated as "good". In June 1984, after graduating from the Military Academy of the General Staff that year, he was appointed first deputy commander of the 50th Rocket Army at Smolensk, and on 10 December 1987 became commander of the 53rd Rocket Army, Chita. During this time he oversaw the deployment of the RT-2PM Topol mobile intercontinental ballistic missile system.

In November 1992 Muravyov was appointed head of the Strategic Missile Forces Combat Training Directorate, and from 27 August 1993 served as deputy commander of the Strategic Missile Forces for Combat Training, in addition to his role as head of the Strategic Missile Forces Combat Training Directorate. He was promoted to colonel-general in 1994, and in September 1997 became First Deputy Commander-in-Chief of the Strategic Missile Forces, and a regular deputy commander-in-chief from January 1998 onwards. From 27 August 1993 until 30 May 2000 he was also a member of the Military Council of the Strategic Missile Forces. Muravyov reached the age limit for active service and retired on 30 May 2000, entering the reserves.

== Retirement ==
In retirement Muravyov became Chairman of the Council of the Union of Missile Forces Veterans and continued his academic studies as a researcher at the Peter the Great Military Academy of the Strategic Missile Forces, becoming a candidate of military sciences in 2007.

Muravyov died on 21 January 2020 at the age of 81. His funeral was held at the Burdenko Main Military Clinical Hospital in Moscow on 25 January 2020, followed by his interment in Troyekurovskoye Cemetery.

== Awards and honours ==
Muravyov received numerous awards and honours over his career. The Soviet government awarded him the Order of the Badge of Honour in 1972, the Order "For Service to the Homeland in the Armed Forces of the USSR" Third class in 1976 and the Order of the Red Star in 1987. He was awarded the Order of Military Merit by the Russian government in 1995, and the title of Honoured Military Specialist of the Russian Federation in 1999.
