= Order of Bogdan Khmelnitsky (Soviet Union) =

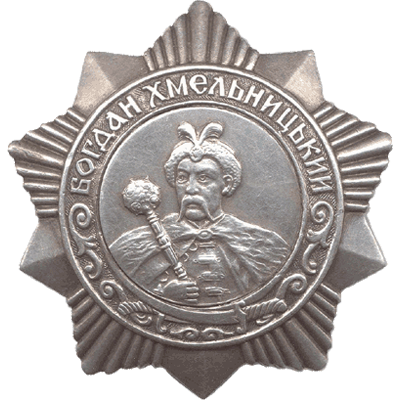
- Soviet Order of Bogdan Khmelnitsky 3rd class
- Type: 3 grade order
- Awarded for: Exceptional duty in combat operations that led to the liberation of the Soviet territory
- Presented by: Soviet Union
- Eligibility: Soviet Armed Forces personnel
- Campaigns: German-Soviet War and others
- Status: discontinued in the Soviet Union, Order with the same name is issued by Ukraine
- Established: October 12, 1943
- First award: October 28, 1943

Highlights
- Total: 8451
- Ribbon of the Order of Bogdan Khmelnitsky 3rd class

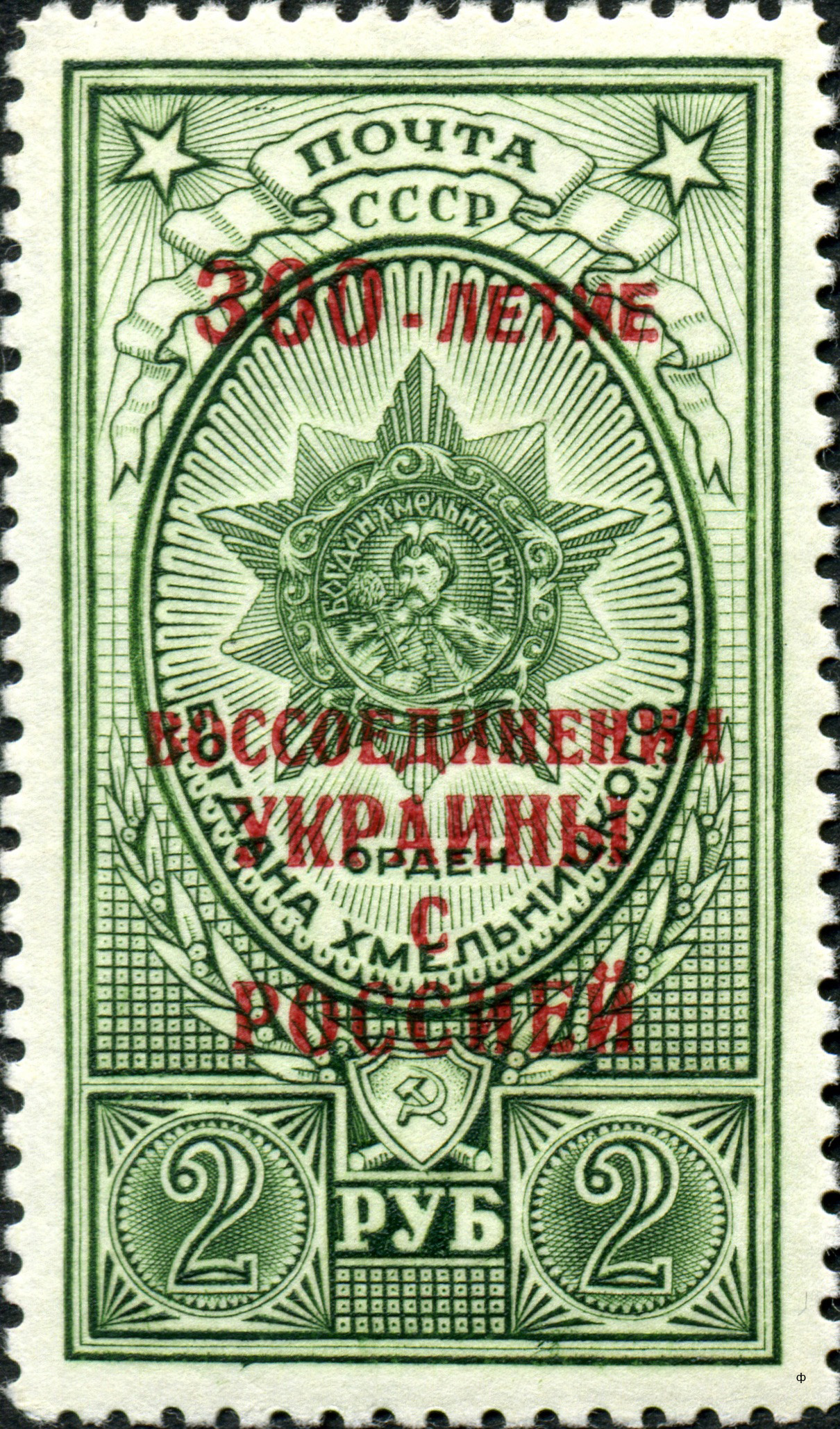
1954 stamp depicting the Order of Bogdan Khmelnitsky; an overprint commemorates the 300th anniversary of the Pereiaslav Agreement and Russian–Ukrainian union.

The Order of Bohdan Khmelnitsky (Russian: Орден Богдана Хмельницкого, romanized: Orden Bogdana Khmel'nitskogo, Ukrainian: Орден Богдана Хмельницького, romanized: Orden Bohdana Khmelʹnytsʹkoho) was a Soviet award named after Bohdan Khmelnytsky, Hetman (leader) of the Ukrainian Cossack Hetmanate. The award was first established on October 12, 1943, (Note: A source from the USSR states that the award was instituted on October 10, 1943.)by the Presidium of Supreme Soviet of the USSR during World War II. It was the only Red Army award to be written in the Ukrainian language.

The order was discontinued after the dissolution of the Soviet Union. A similar award, the Order of Bohdan Khmelnytsky, was begun on May 3, 1995, by Ukrainian president Leonid Kuchma to commemorate the 50th anniversary of victory in the German-Soviet War.

== Description ==
The General Nikita Khrushchev, the Soviet filmmaker Alexander Dovzhenko, and poet Mykola Bazhan initiated the idea to create this award. The order was created during World War II and was awarded to Soviet Armed Forces personnel and often the members of the Ukrainian Front (coincidentally three of them were reinstated on October 20, 1943) for their exceptional duty in combat operations that led to the liberation of Soviet territory. The Order of Bohdan Khmelnitsky was broken down into three different classes: 1st class, 2nd class and 3rd class. General Alexei Danilov became the first recipient of the 1st class Order of Bogdan Khmelnitsky.

The 1st class medal was awarded to army commanders, especially at the front, for successful direction of combat operations that led to the liberation of a region or town where they were successful in inflicting heavy casualties on the enemy. Altogether 323 people were awarded Order of Bogdan Khmelnitsky 1st class.

Distinguished people who received this order were several future Marshals of the Soviet Union including Sergey Biryuzov, Kirill Moskalenko, Matvei Zakharov and Petr Koshevoi amongst others.

The 2nd class medal was awarded to corps, divisions, brigade or battalion commanders for a breach of a defensive enemy line or a raid into the enemy's rear. 2400 people were awarded Order of Bohdan Khmelnitsky, 2nd class.

The 3rd class medal was awarded to officers, partisan commanders, sergeants, corporals and privates of the Red Army and partisan units for outstanding bravery and resourcefulness leading to a battle victory. 5700 people were awarded Order of Bogdan Khmelnitsky, 3rd class. Most of them were either Red Army soldiers who fought on the Ukrainian Front or Ukrainian partisans.

The Order was discontinued after the dissolution of the Soviet Union. In 1995 Ukraine established a new Order of Bohdan Khmelnytsky to commemorate the 50th anniversary of the end of World War II. Although it has the same name, it is a different medal.

First Class	Second Class	Third Class
Ten pointed star medallion. Five points are cast in silver, five in gold. The colors alternate. A ring of silver circles the center medallion, which is in gold and shows an image of Bogdan Khmelnitsky holding a scepter.	Ten pointed star medallion. All ten points are cast in silver. A silver ring circles the center medallion, which is in gold and shows an image of Bogdan Khmelnitsky holding a scepter.	Ten pointed star medallion. All ten points are cast in silver. A silver ring circles the center medallion, which is in silver and shows an image of Bogdan Khmelnitsky holding a scepter.
Ribbon
Blue ribbon with a single, wide stripe of white in the center.	Blue ribbon with a white stripe decorating both the right and left ends. The stripes are of equal width.	Blue ribbon with three white stripes: one on each end and one in the center, all of equal width.
