= Moscow Victory Day Parade =

Military parade of the Russian Armed Forces

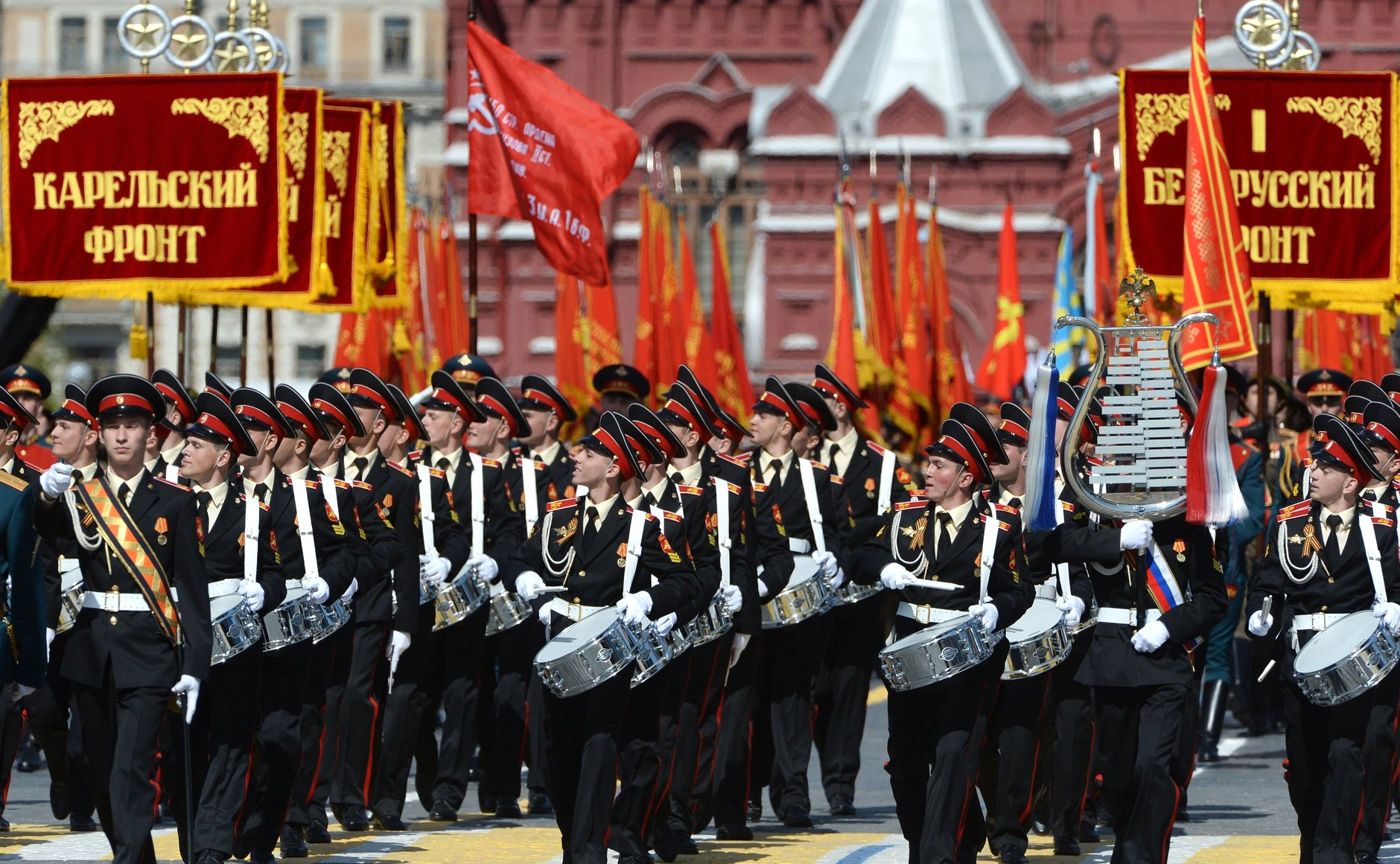
The cadets of the Moscow Military Music College leading the platinum jubilee parade in 2015.

The Moscow Victory Day Parade (Russian: Парад Победы в Москве, romanized: Parad Pobedy v Moskve) is an annual military parade of the Russian Armed Forces on Moscow's Red Square on 9 May during the Victory Day celebrations. The most important parade of those being held on 9 May is the one held on Moscow's Red Square, with the President of Russia as the guest of honor and keynote speaker in virtue of his constitutional mandate as Supreme Commander of the Russian Armed Forces. The parade is a commemoration of the capitulation of Nazi Germany to the Red Army, marking the end of the Eastern Front of World War II, known in Russia as the Great Patriotic War.

According to anthropologist Sergey Ushakin, modern victory parades are intended to demonstrate the direct and immediate connection of the present with the past and to materialize the connection between generations. Longtime parade commander Oleg Salyukov described them as a "celebration for people, not [a] show of militarism" referring to accusations of the parade being used as show of Russian military might.

Held only four times during the Soviet era (immediately after the end of World War II in 1945, and again for the 20th, 40th, and 45th anniversaries of victory), the parade has been an annual event in the Russian Federation since 1995.

== History ==
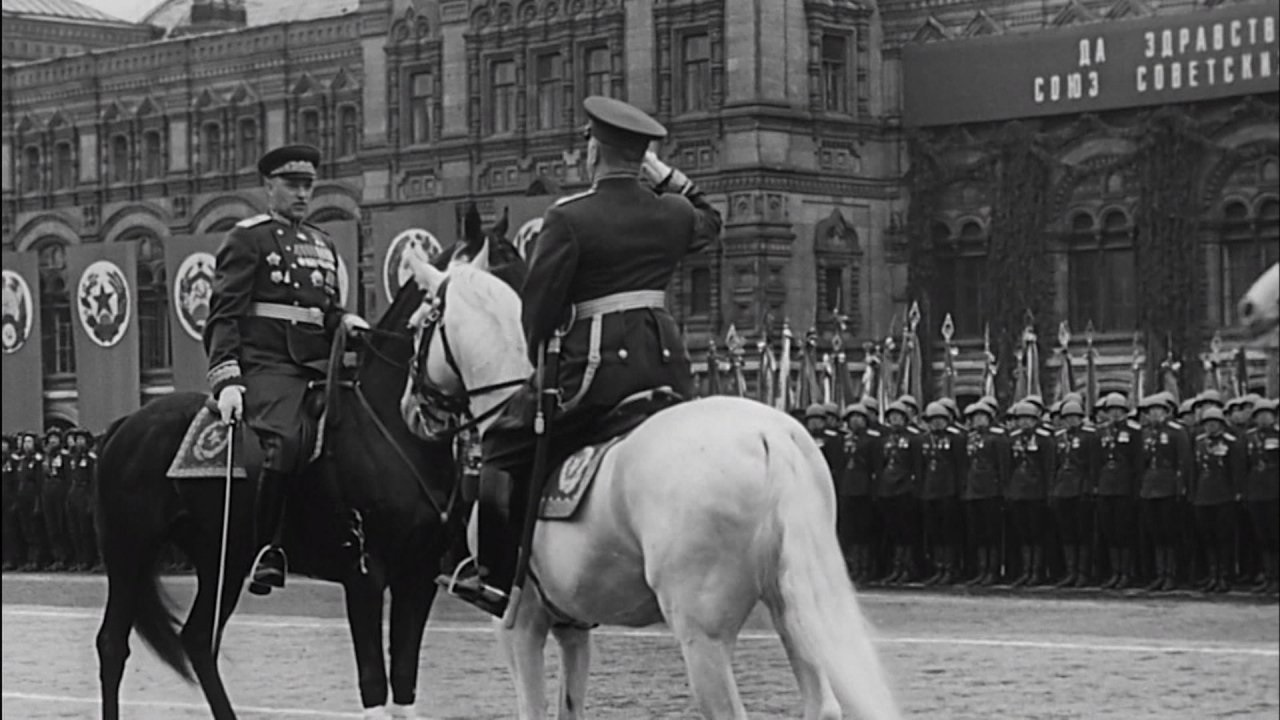
Marshal Georgy Zhukov receiving a report from Marshal Konstantin Rokossovsky during the parade.

The first military parade on Red Square in honor of the defeat of Nazi Germany took place with the participation of the Soviet Armed Forces and a guest appearance by a small detachment from the First Polish Army on 24 June 1945. It was the longest and largest parade in the Soviet capital, lasting hours and utilizing 40,000 Red Army soldiers as well as 1,850 military vehicles. It took place over a month after the victory actually took place on 9 May, the day of Germany's surrender. Intensive preparations for the parade took place in late May and early June in Moscow. The preliminary rehearsal of the Victory Parade took place at Khodynka Aerodrome, and the general rehearsal on Red Square on 22 June. The day after the parade, a reception was held in the Grand Kremlin Palace in honor of the participants in the Victory Parade. After the 1945 parade, Victory Day became obsolete in the Soviet Union, with parades only being held on major jubilee, in part to favor the October Revolution Day parade which took place every year in the autumn. In the decades that followed, three parades were held: in 1965, 1985, and 1990.

Parades were not held between 1991 and 1994, partly because First Deputy Prime Minister Gennady Burbulis thought of it as impractical primarily based on the state of the country at that time, particularly in terms of costs and expenses. The Victory Day Parade of 1995 was held to commemorate the golden jubilee of the Soviet victory in the war. It was the first one held in the newly formed Russian Federation, taking place 4 years after the fall of the Soviet Union. The parade was divided into two parts, a full military parade on Poklonnaya Hill and a veterans ceremony on Red Square. Since then it began to be held every year on 9 May except during the 2020 edition of the parade marking the 75th anniversary of the victory over Nazi Germany, which was postponed to 24 June due to the coronavirus pandemic. In April 2026, the Kremlin announced that Russia would hold a different version of the parade without the usual display of military equipment due to concerns over Ukrainian attacks.

== Description ==
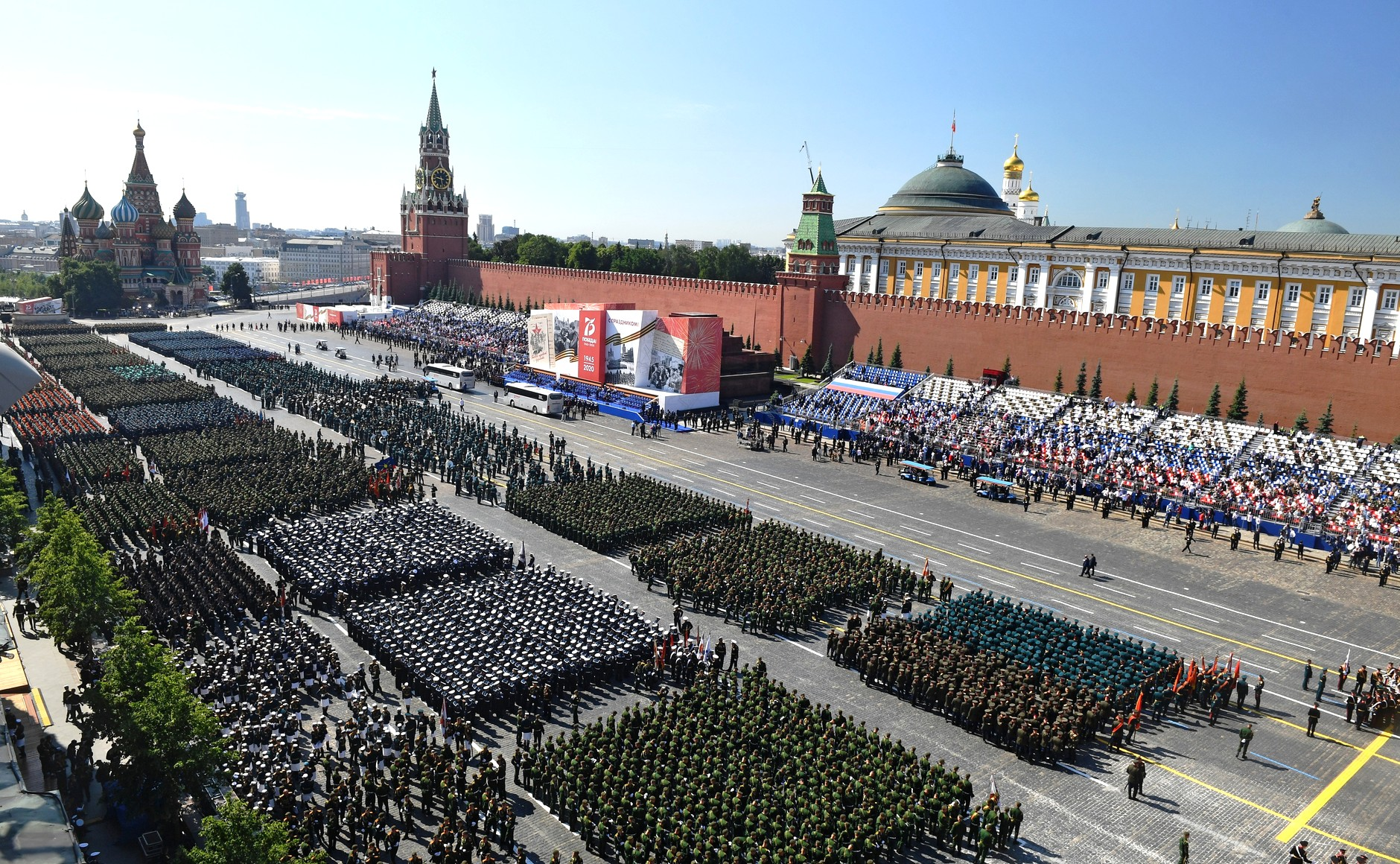
Troops prior to the 2020 parade, taken on 24 June.

On the morning of the parade, an estimated 14,000 military personnel, including a regiment of female cadets and youth cadets, assemble by battalions on the square together with the more than 210 vehicles and 3,800 vehicle crews assembled on Tverskaya Street just north of the Manezhnaya Square, Moscow, during the major parades a battalion or company of historical Red Army vehicles, estimated at around 36 vehicles and composed of just the T-34, GAZ-67 and the SU-100 plus the optional BM-13N (or at around an estimated 480 when counting other vehicles of the war which would take part just like in the parades of 1985 and 1990) assemble on the street as well with modern military hardware of the Armed Forces and the National Guard (and optionally by the other uniformed organizations). At the air bases outside Moscow (in areas like Kubinka), more than 88 aircraft are assembled with their aircrews for the flypast segment.

The celebrations begin at 9:55 am Moscow Standard Time with the arrival of the President and the Prime Minister of Russia to a special grandstand in front of Lenin's Mausoleum, where six of the past parades were reviewed by national leaders. They greet the Chief of the General Staff of the Armed Forces, service commanders, deputy ministers in the Ministry of Defence and commanders of the support units within the Armed Forces, together with veterans, veterans' families and representatives of the Suvorov and Nakhimov Schools assembled. To the left and right of the grandstand are the stands wherein veterans, veterans' families and descendants and families of personnel killed in action are gathered. In between the grandstand to the south of the stands are two platoons of armed linemen and markers from the 154th Preobrazhensky Independent Commandant's Regiment in the Imperial-styled military uniforms and some unarmed half-companies of the Kremlin Regiment, both of which would be later taking post to mark the distance of the troops marching past and to line the square's western side facing the Kremlin together with extra drum majors from the Band Service, which are there to coordinate the march past to be timed in with the music of the bands since the parade of 1995. At the square, the parade commander (usually a Colonel General or rarely a General of the Army with the billet of Commander of the Ground Forces or as the Deputy Chief of General Staff) takes his place in a special an Aurus Senat armored limousine (formerly a Zil until 2018), having just received the report on the readiness of the parade from the commandant of the Combined Arms Academy who is a general officer.

In the seconds prior to the parade, the announcer traditionally says the following: "Attention, this is Moscow speaking and showing. Listen to and watch Red Square. This is the Victory Parade in honor of the (insert anniversary year) anniversary of the Victory in the Great Patriotic War of 1941–1945!". As the Spasskaya Tower of the Kremlin sounds the chimes at 10 am the parade commander orders the parade to present arms as the 154th PICR's 1st Honor Guard Company Colour Guard, to the melody of The Sacred War being played by the Massed Bands, marches into the square and past the dignitaries with guard carrying both the Flag of Russia and the Victory Banner. As the colour guards approach the grandstand, the colour officers execute eyes left and resume above face after passing by. This is followed by the parade being commanded to stand at ease after the colours take their place at the northwest end of the square fronting the State Historical Museum, besides the colour of the Armed Forces. Then the Minister of Defence (either a civilian or a general officer, usually a billet of a General of the Army if for the latter) is driven on the limousine to the center of the square nearest the official tribune, the parade presenting arms again at this point. The parade commander informs him of the readiness of the parade to be inspected. The following report is given:

Comrade Minister of Defence of the Russian Federation!
The troops of the Moscow Garrison participating in the parade in honor of the (states anniversary number) of the victory in the Great Patriotic War have all been assembled!
Commander of the Parade, (states name and rank)

Once the report is received, and to the tune of the Massed Bands the Minister and the parade commander are driven to inspect the parading contingents each together with the bands. As the limousines stop the Minister sends Victory Day greetings to each of the parading contingents, in which they respond with a threefold loud Oorah that is heard all over the grounds. After the final greeting, the Massed Bands strike up to Slavsya from A Life for the Tsar as the PC returns to his place, the Minister driven to the grandstand amidst loud shouts of Oorah by the parade contingents where he dismounts the limousine and the Corps of Drums of the Moscow Military Music College, an affiliate of the Suvorov Military Schools, take their place behind the parade commander's car led by the Commandant of the College and the college colour guard. The parade is ordered to stand at ease after the Minister informs the President that the parade is formed up for the march past in review and its inspection officially completed. In the 1965, 1985 and 1990 parades, the limousines would inspect the personnel of the mobile column at the Manezhnaya Square formed into battalions, in remembrance of the mounted inspection of the original 1945 parade, which included cavalry, tachankas and horse artillery in addition to the huge mobile column. Following the report of the Minister of Defence, the keynote holiday address to the nation of the President follows, preceded by a fanfare by the Massed Bands, usually Govovin's Moscow Fanfare. A moment of silence, since 2015, features as part of the keynote address.

As the president finishes the address and a threefold Ура! resounds all over the square by the entire parade assembled and the honor guard presents arms, the Massed Bands play the National Anthem of Russia and a ceremonial battery armed with the 76 mm divisional gun M1942 (ZiS-3) fire a 21-gun salute. In the 2000s, a band didn't perform the anthem, with the soldiers on parade singing all three verses. In 2009, Defence Minister Anatoliy Serdyukov changed this, stating that because of the acoustics of the Red Square, only an orchestra would be used, saying that the soldier's "voices would be swallowed by the echo". As the anthem ends, the bands sound Retreat as the honor guard executes order arms and the parade commander orders the parade to commence the march past in the following manner:

Parade... attention! Ceremonial march past!
Form battalions! Distance by a single lineman! First battalion will remain facing to the right, remainder... left.. turn!
Slope.. arms!

As the command is given to start the march past in view the linemen take their places and the field markers, also as well at the western end of the square facing the stands and the grandstand. As the PC ends the commands with "Eyes to the right, forward, quick march!", the Corps of Drums of the Moscow Military Music College, as is their tradition since 1938, march first to the tune of the "General Miloradovich" by one of its late alumni, Lieutenant General Valery Khalilov. As the massed bands start playing the Corps of Drums stop playing by the signal of the Corps Drum Major and swings its drumsticks while on the eyes right. The Corps is followed by the colour guard of the 154th PICR and its 1st Honor Guard Company, during jubilee parades, the colour guard is followed by a company of colour bearers carrying the front standards in the order of their marchpast in the 1945 Victory Parade and their escorts, colours from the regiments, brigades and divisions which took part in the original 1945 parade and a historical unit of servicemen in period uniforms, optionally joined by the Kuban Cossacks, in memory of their contingent which marched past on that very parade, and the Escort Cavalry Squadron of the Kremlin Regiment plus a number of international contingents. This is followed by the rest of the parade ground column, starting with the youth contingents and by the Combined Arms Academy, among other troops.

The ground column ends, as the massed bands play either Victory Day or "Let's Go", with the traditional marchpast of the Moscow Higher Military Command School, which has been done since the golden jubilee October Revolution Day parade of 1967 as a commemoration of the school's importance as the first military officer cadet school to be established in modern-day Russia, the first time it had been seen last in the Victory Day parade ground column was in 1985 (the two battalions of the school's Corps of Cadets also march past the square in memory of the cadets who fought in the 1941 Battle of Moscow). With the ground segment competed the bands stop playing at the signal of the senior director and the senior drum majors and, to give way to the mobile column, march towards the facade of the GUM department store, with two sections of the MMMC Corps of Drums at either side of the bands, reflecting the formations of the massed bands alongside the Corps of Drums in the Red Square parades of the 1950s and the 1960s.

The mobile column starts with the drive past of historical vehicles in jubilee years. In non-special anniversary years only a T-34/85 medium battle tank carrying the Victory Banner leads the column of tens of military vehicles and equipment. As the Massed Bands play appropriate music the column drives past the stands in the Square, with the crew commanders and unit leaders executing a hand salute in the eyes right position (save for MRLs and mobile ICBMs). Following the end of the mobile column with the service flags of the three branches of the Armed Forces the flypast then follows, usually as the Bands play the Aviamarch and other air marches the flypast marks the formal termination of the parade with tens of aircraft from the Air Force flying past above the square in full view of everyone in attendance. However in certain parades, flypasts may be cancelled due to poor weather conditions, which occurred in the 2022 Victory Day Parade.

=== Gallery of the stages of the parade ===
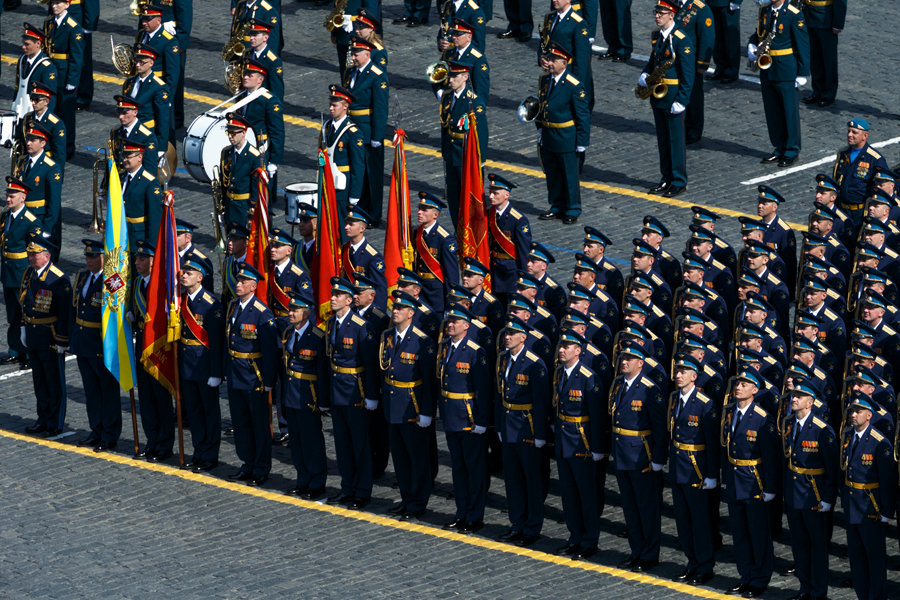
The combined regiment of the Russian Aerospace Forces on parade.

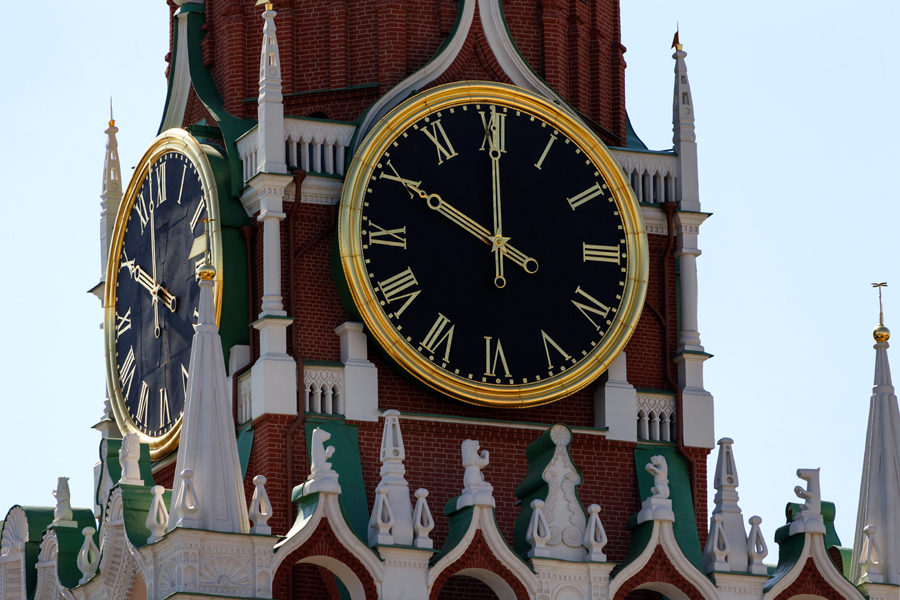
Spasskaya Tower

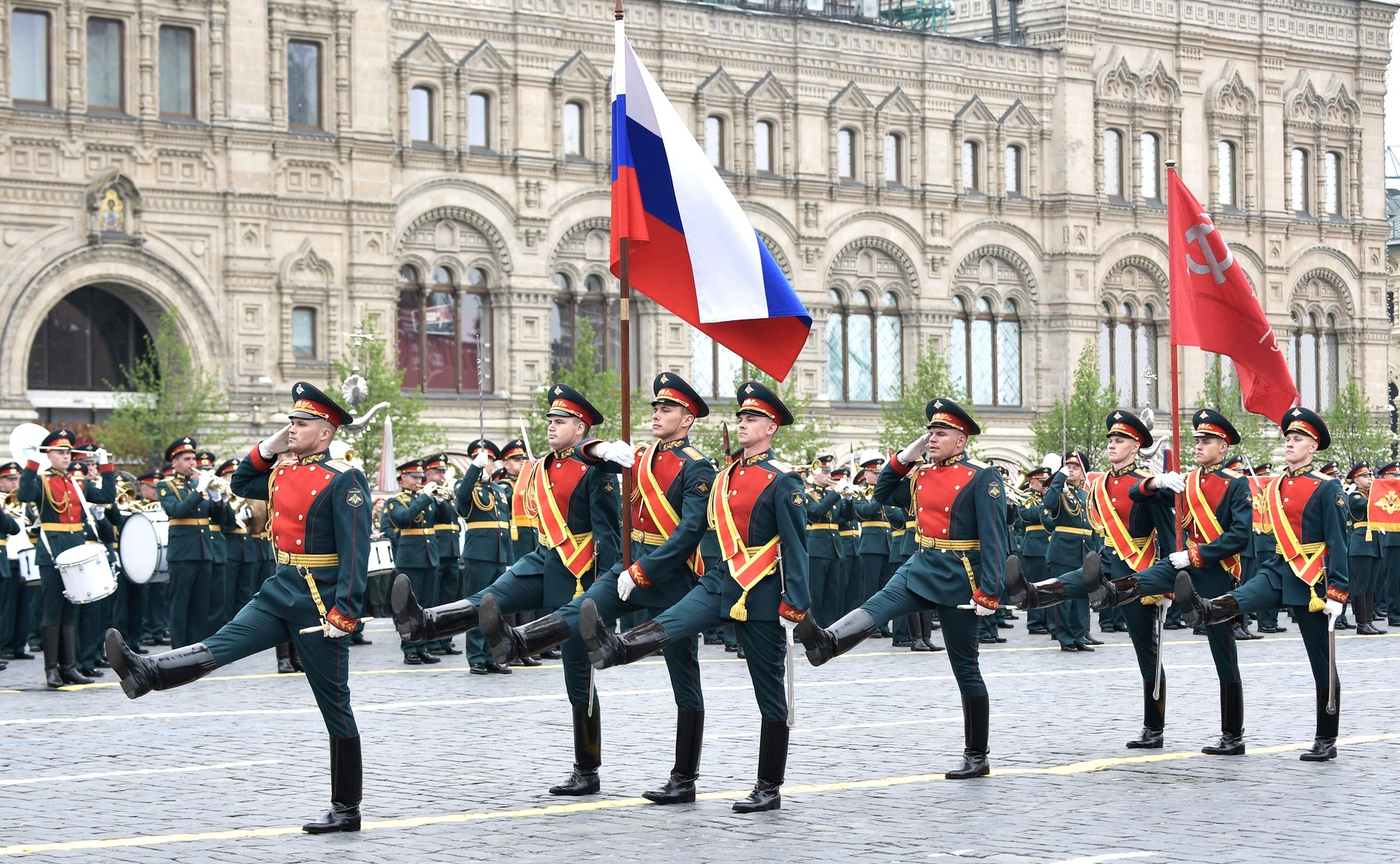
The trooping of the Russian Flag and the Banner of Victory.

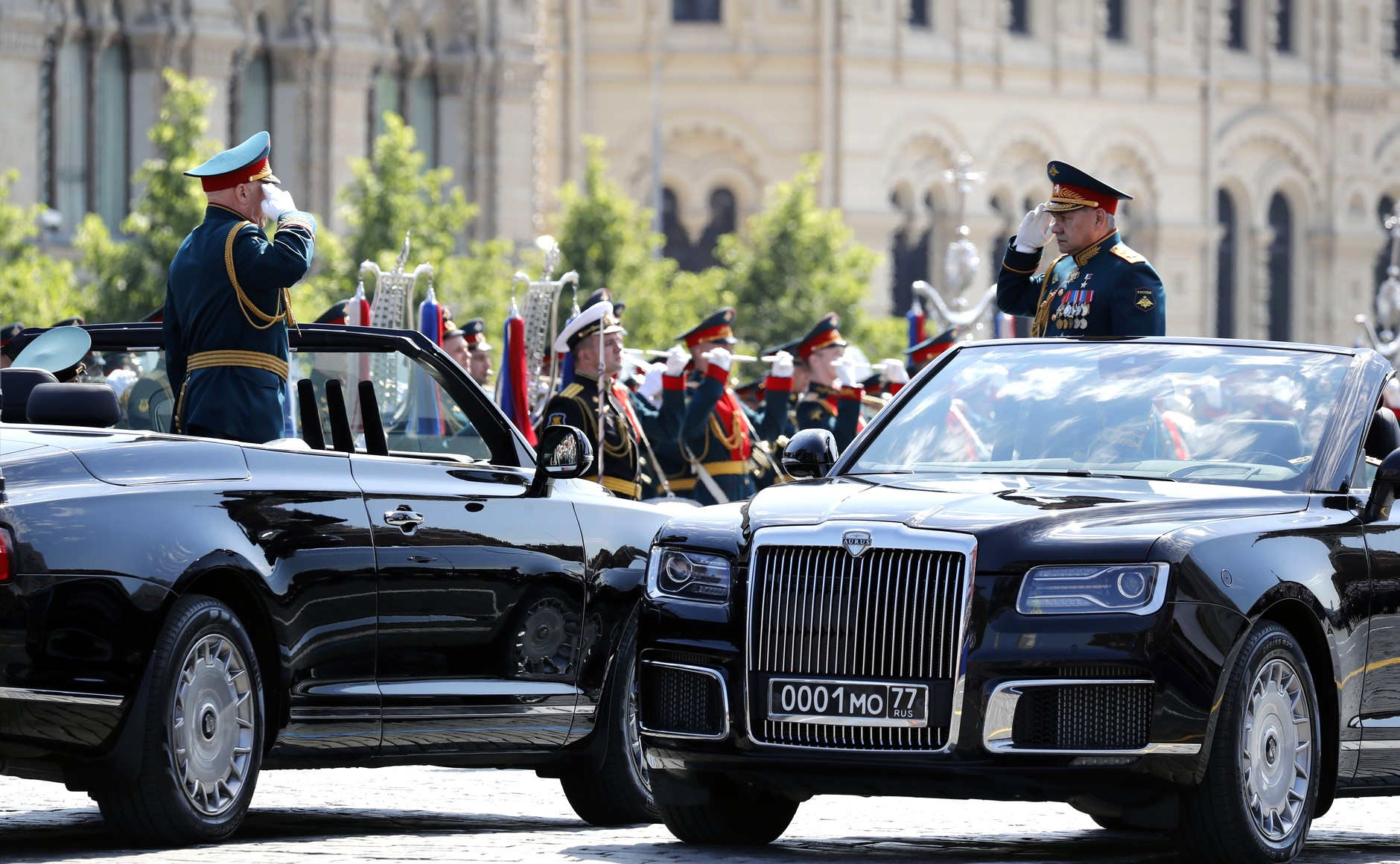
The parade report.

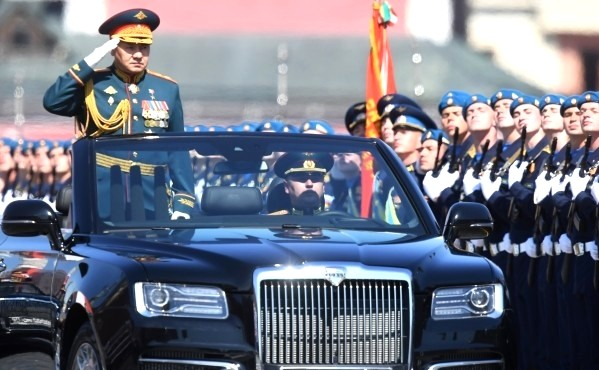
The inspection of troops.

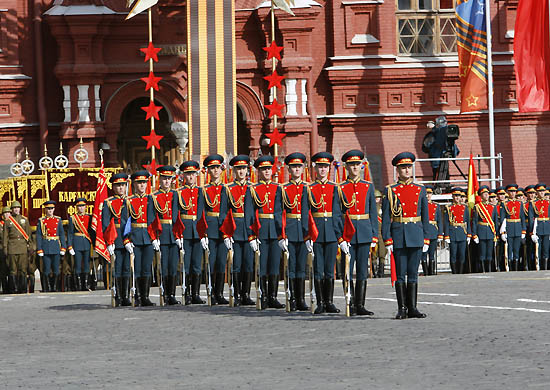
154th Preobrazhensky Independent Commandant's Regiment.

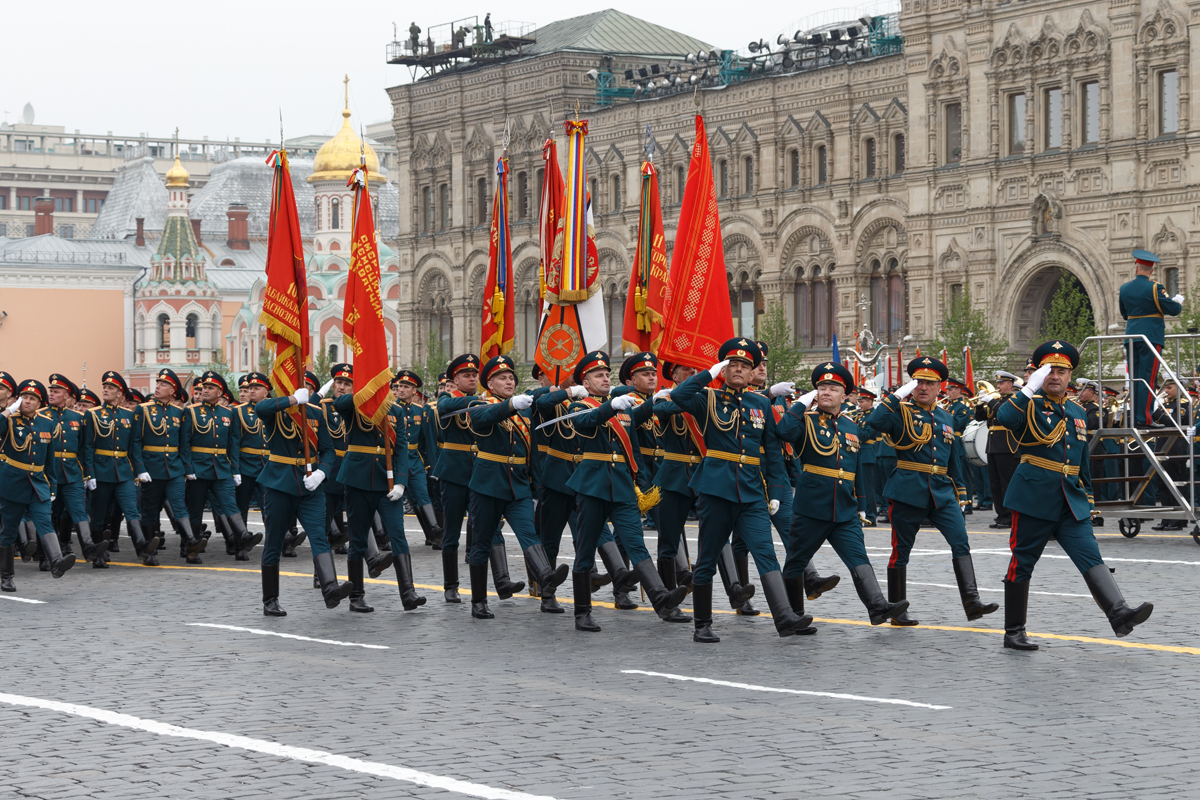
The Combined Arms Academy opening the active duty portion of the ground column.

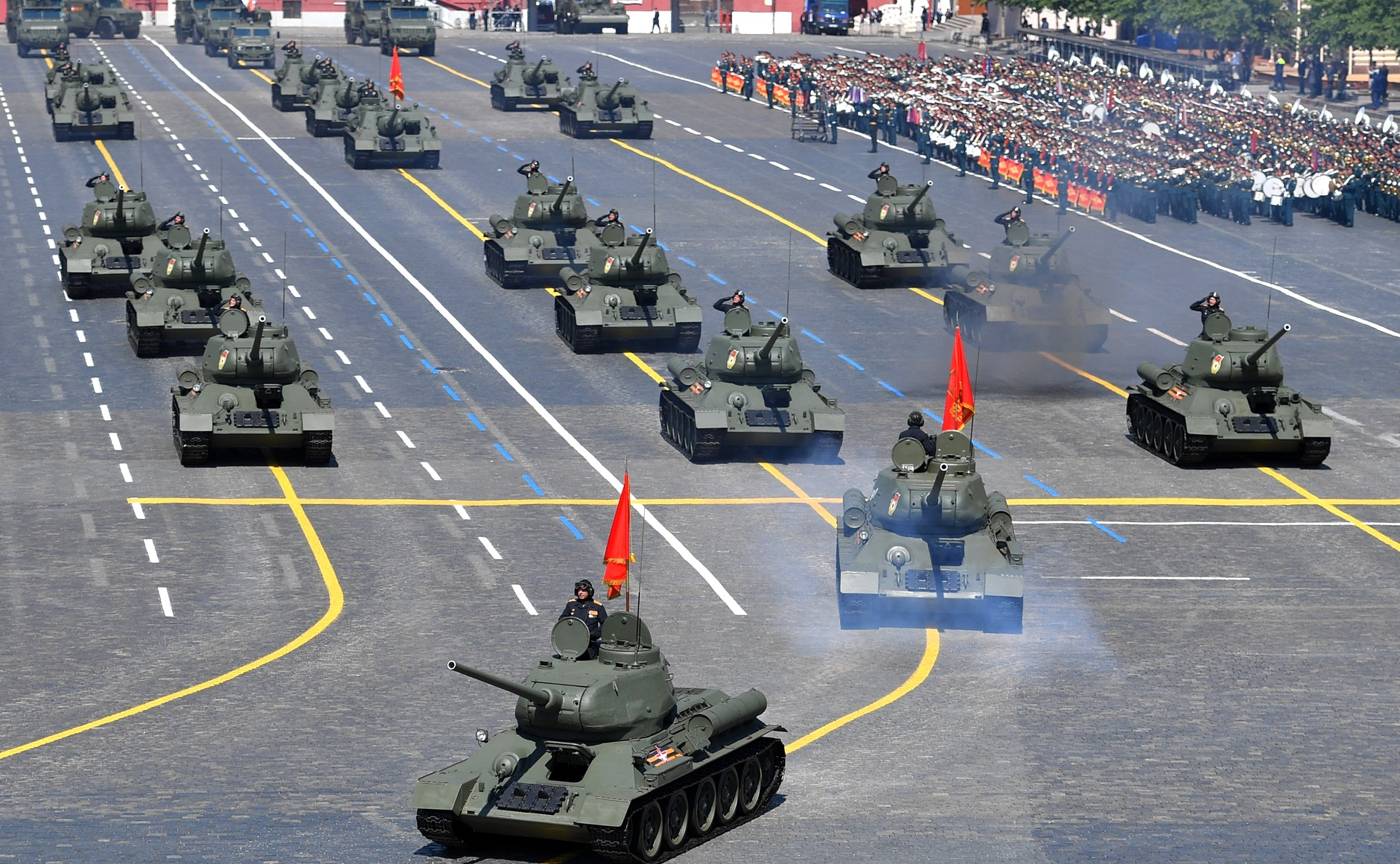
The mobile column.

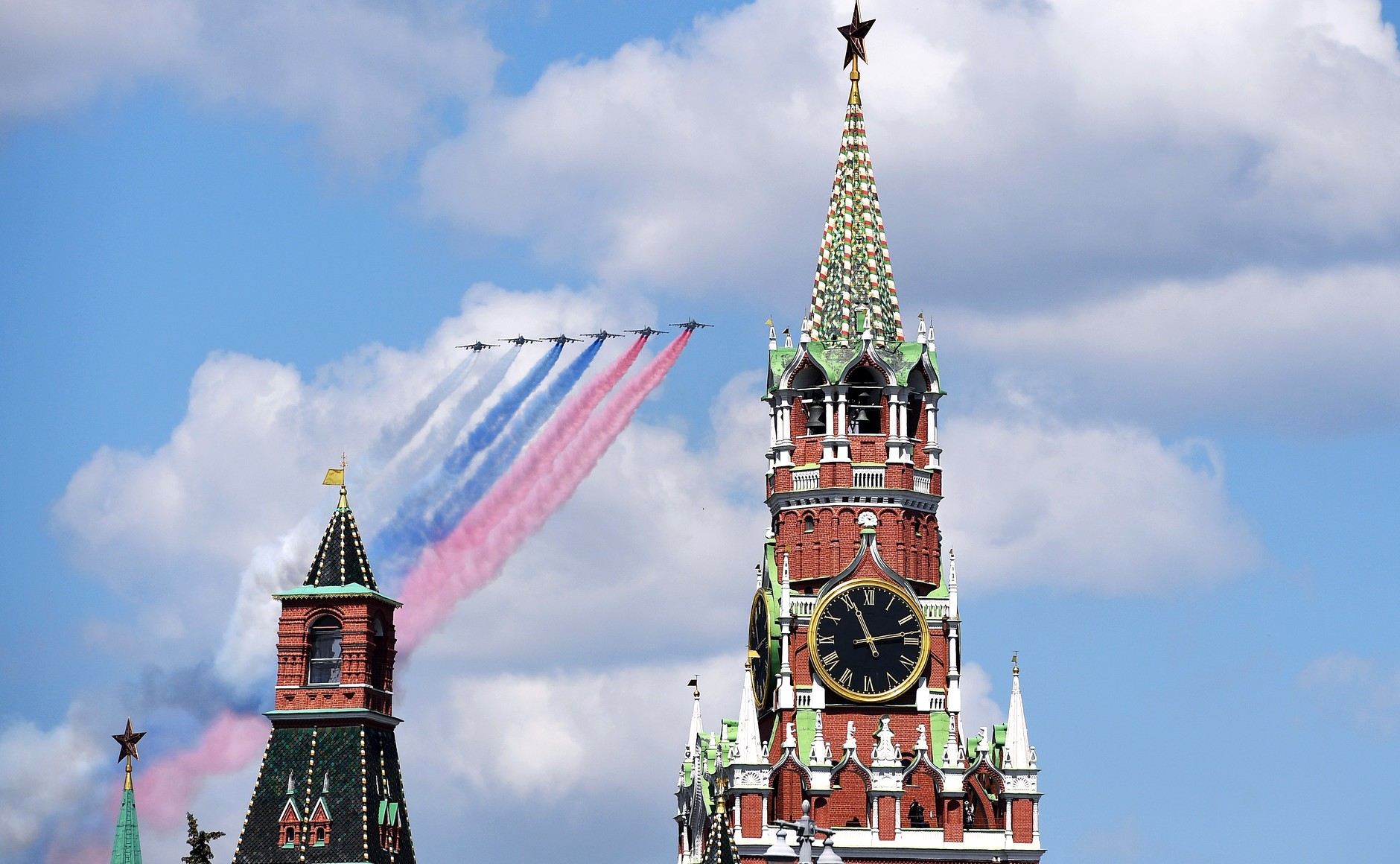
The flypast.

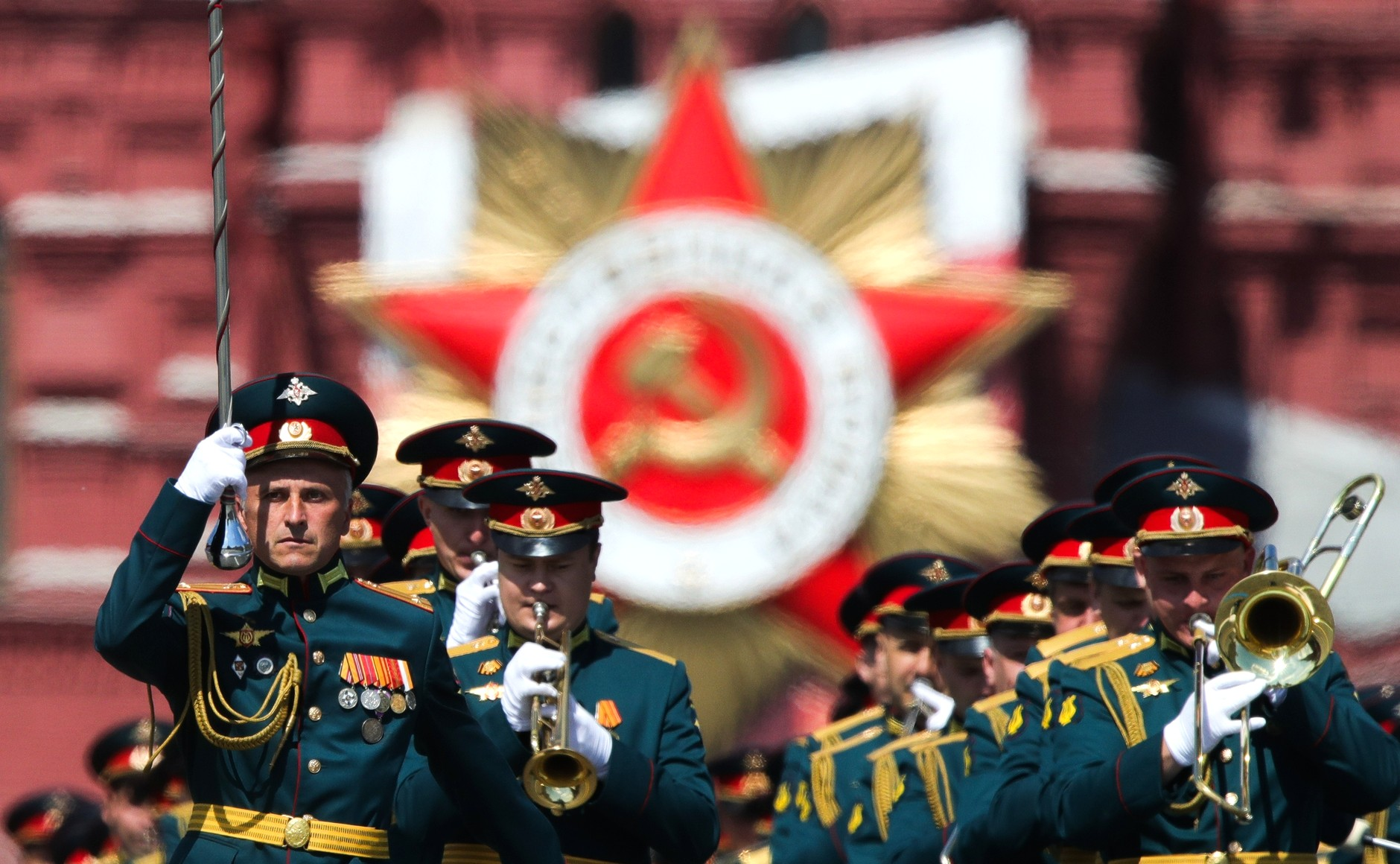
The marchpast of the massed bands.

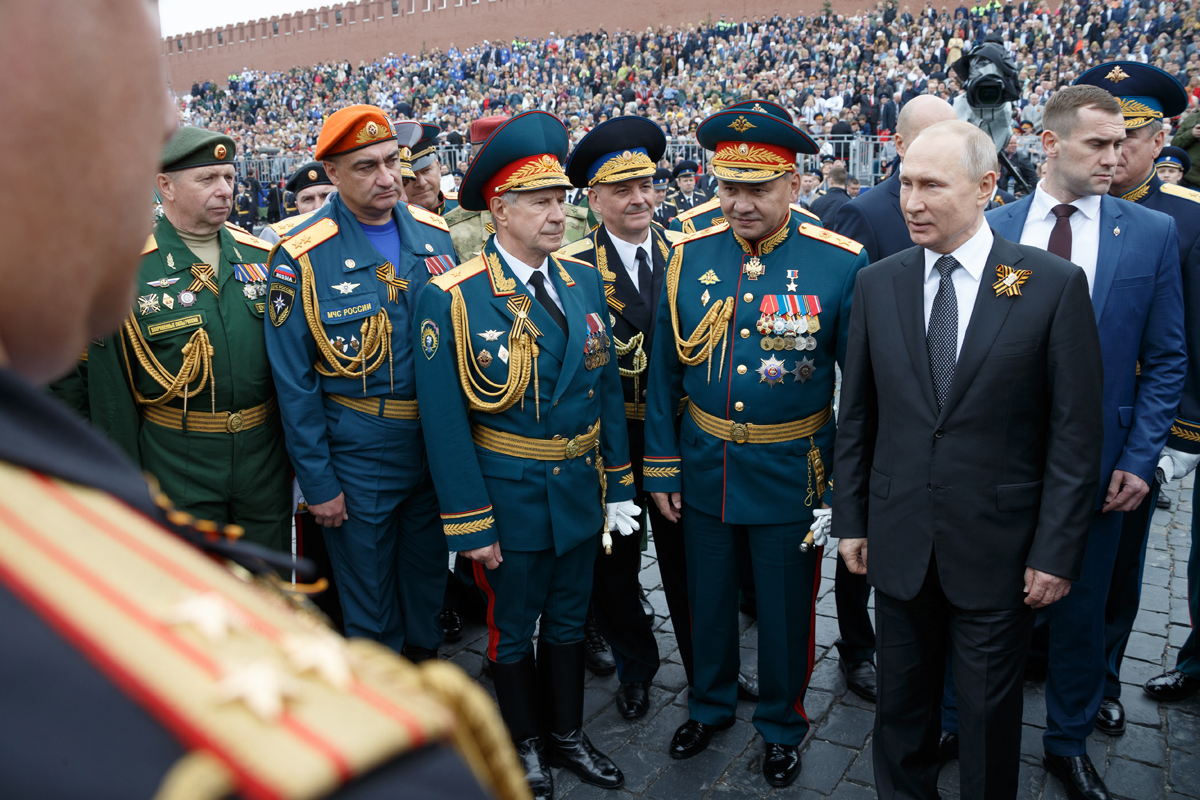
President Putin greeting the commanders of parade formations.

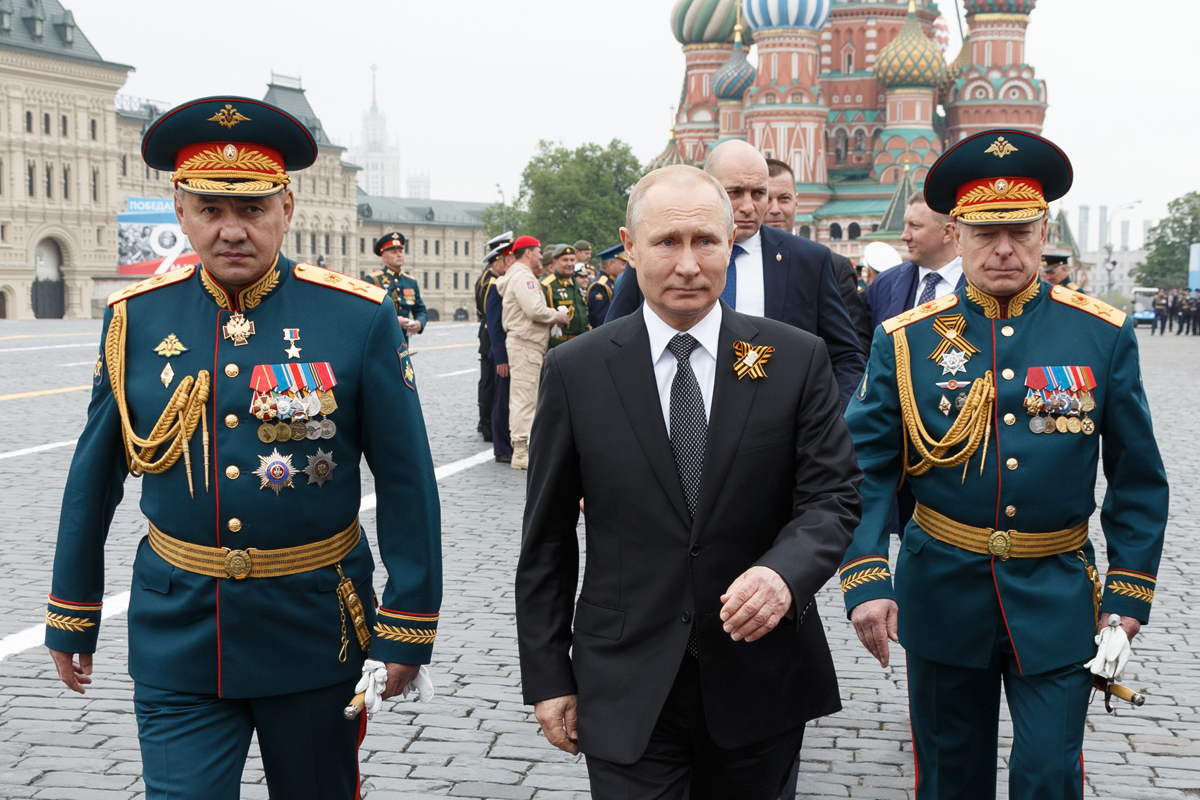
President Putin (center), General Shoigu (left) and General Salyukov (right) walking to the Tomb of the Unknown Soldier.

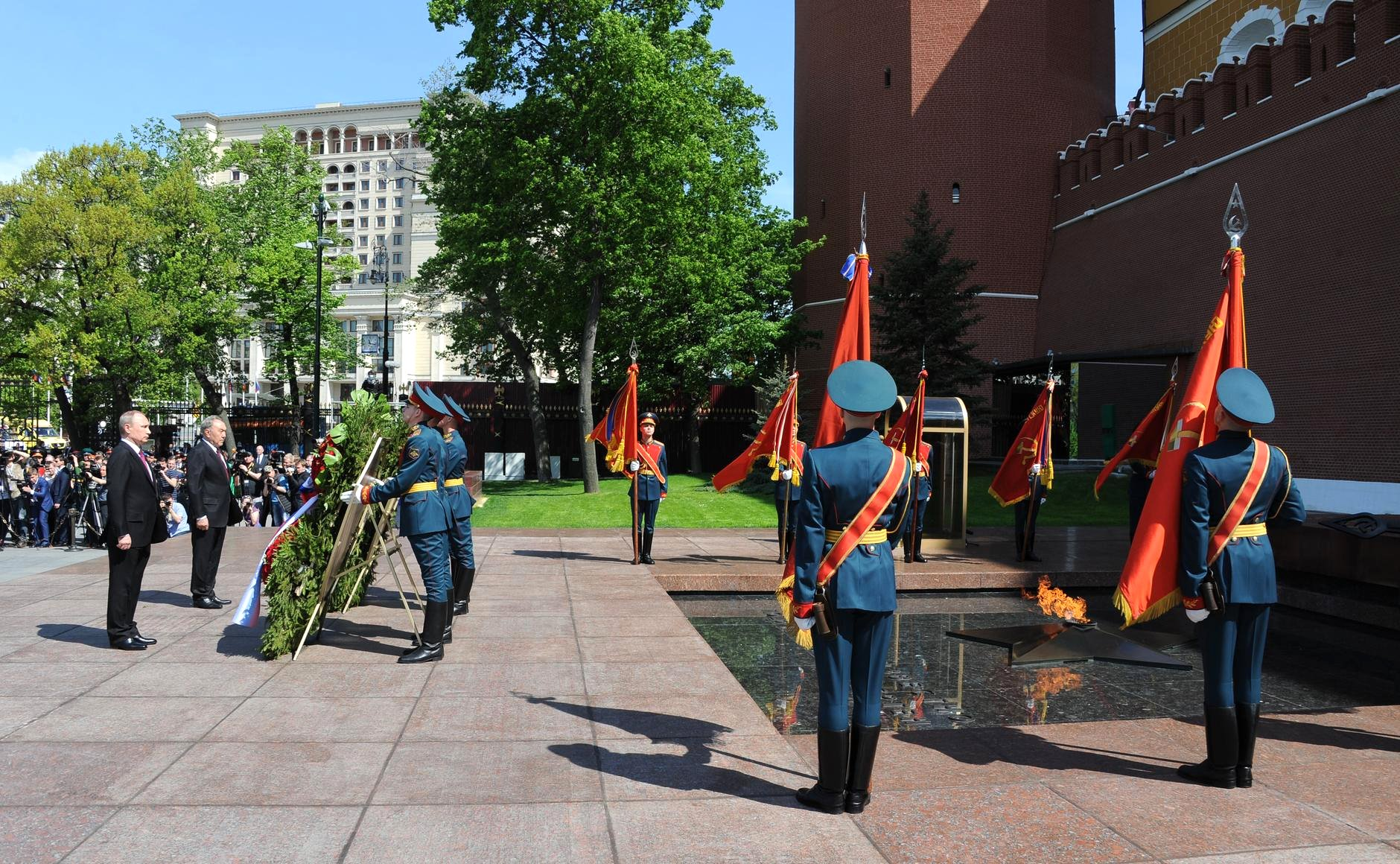
Wreath-laying ceremony at the Tomb of the Unknown Soldier.

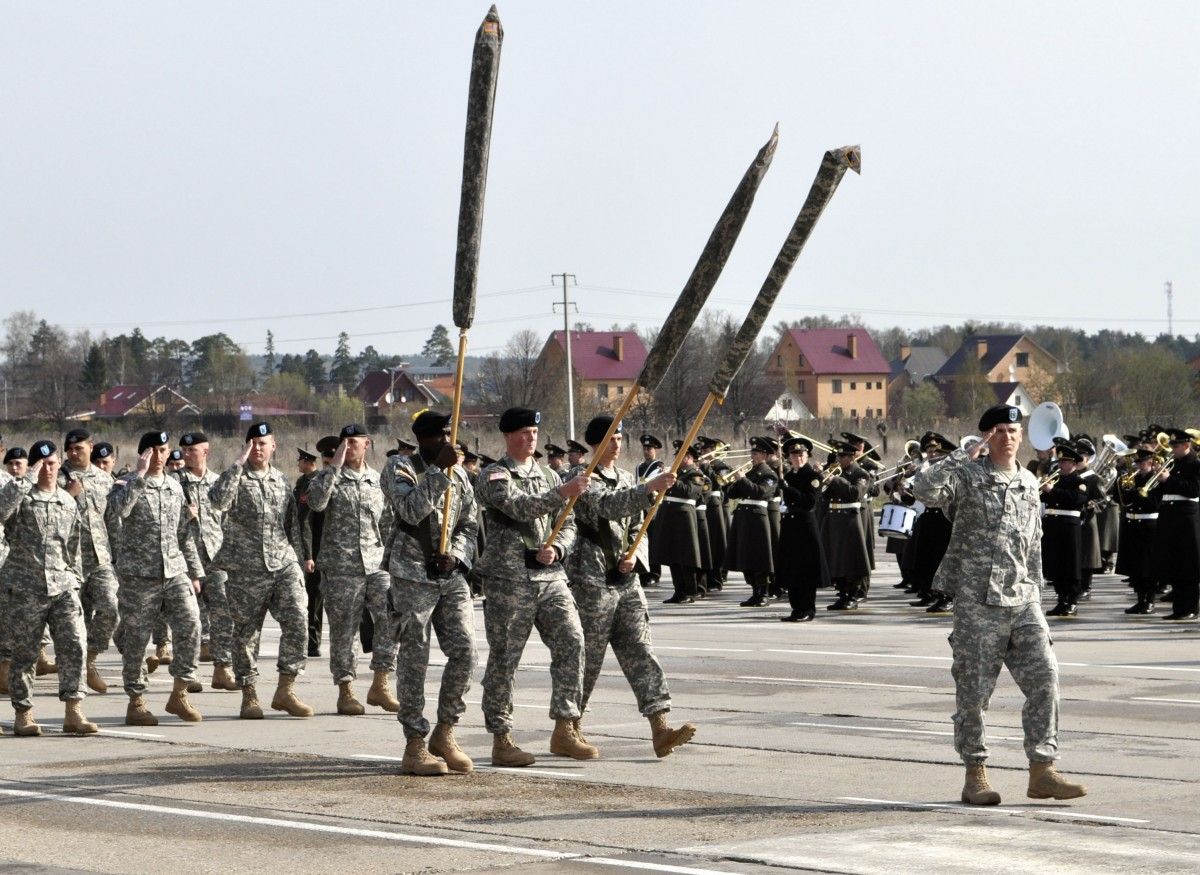
The American contingent at the general rehearsal parade in Alabino in 2010.

Early preparations for the parade begin in the last two months of the previous year. In these early stages, organizers at the MoD discuss the size of the parade, units/military equipment attending, extra details and on jubilee years, the invitation of foreign troops. During this time, regular participants practice their drill routines from their home units at various locations. Full parade rehearsals begin in March at a training center in the village of Alabino, which is located in the Moscow Oblast. In their working uniforms, parade participants do a full run through of the entire ceremony to the closest extent possible. In the last week of April, the rehearsals are moved to Red Square, as they are conducted in the evening time. The flypast segment of the parade begin during these practice runs with all aircraft practicing from the Kubinka airfield. In some cases, the flypast is rehearsed solely without any mobile and ground columns. Typically, the final dress rehearsal takes place 2–3 days before the actual parade and is usually live-streamed on outlets such as Ruptly.

=== Presiding officers ===
| Year | Parade commander | Parade inspector |
|---|---|---|
| 1945 | Marshal Konstantin Rokossovsky | Marshal Georgy Zhukov |
| 1965 | General of the Army Afanasy Beloborodov | Marshal Rodion Malinovsky |
| 1985 | General of the Army Pyotr Lushev | Marshal Sergey Sokolov |
| 1990 | Colonel General Nikolai Vasilyevich Kalinin | Marshal Dmitry Yazov |
| 1995 | General of the Army Vladimir Govorov/Colonel General Leonid Kuznetsov | Marshal Viktor Kulikov/General of the Army Pavel Grachev |
| 1996 | Colonel General Leonid Kuznetsov | General of the Army Pavel Grachev |
| 1997 | Lieutenant General Igor Puzanov | Colonel General Leonid Kuznetsov |
| 1998 | Colonel General Leonid Kuznetsov | Marshal Igor Sergeyev |
| 1999 | Colonel General Igor Puzanov | Marshal Igor Sergeyev |
| 2000 | General of the Army Vladimir Govorov/Colonel General Igor Puzanov | Marshal Igor Sergeyev |
| 2001 | Colonel General Nikolai Makarov | Minister of Defense Sergei Ivanov |
| 2002 | Colonel General Ivan Yefremov | Minister of Defense Sergei Ivanov |
| 2003 | Colonel General Ivan Yefremov | Minister of Defense Sergei Ivanov |
| 2004 | General of the Army Ivan Yefremov | Minister of Defense Sergei Ivanov |
| 2005 | General of the Army Ivan Yefremov | Minister of Defense Sergei Ivanov |
| 2006 | Colonel General Vladimir Bakin | Minister of Defense Sergei Ivanov |
| 2007 | General of the Army Vladimir Bakin | Minister of Defense Anatoliy Serdyukov |
| 2008 | General of the Army Vladimir Bakin | Minister of Defense Anatoliy Serdyukov |
| 2009 | Colonel General Valery Gerasimov | Minister of Defense Anatoliy Serdyukov |
| 2010 | Colonel General Valery Gerasimov | Minister of Defense Anatoliy Serdyukov |
| 2011 | Colonel General Valery Gerasimov | Minister of Defense Anatoliy Serdyukov |
| 2012 | Colonel General Valery Gerasimov | Minister of Defense Anatoliy Serdyukov |
| 2013 | Colonel General Vladimir Chirkin | Minister of Defense Sergei Shoigu |
| 2014 | Colonel General Oleg Salyukov | Minister of Defense Sergei Shoigu |
| 2015 | Colonel General Oleg Salyukov | Minister of Defense Sergei Shoigu |
| 2016 | Colonel General Oleg Salyukov | Minister of Defense Sergei Shoigu |
| 2017 | Colonel General Oleg Salyukov | Minister of Defense Sergei Shoigu |
| 2018 | Colonel General Oleg Salyukov | Minister of Defense Sergei Shoigu |
| 2019 | General of the Army Oleg Salyukov | Minister of Defense Sergei Shoigu |
| 2020 | General of the Army Oleg Salyukov | Minister of Defense Sergei Shoigu |
| 2021 | General of the Army Oleg Salyukov | Minister of Defense Sergei Shoigu |
| 2022 | General of the Army Oleg Salyukov | Minister of Defense Sergei Shoigu |
| 2023 | General of the Army Oleg Salyukov | Minister of Defense Sergei Shoigu |
| 2024 | General of the Army Oleg Salyukov | Minister of Defense Sergei Shoigu |
| 2025 | General of the Army Oleg Salyukov | Minister of Defense Andrey Belousov |
| 2026 | Colonel General Andrey Mordvichev | Minister of Defense Andrey Belousov |

== Traditions and additions ==
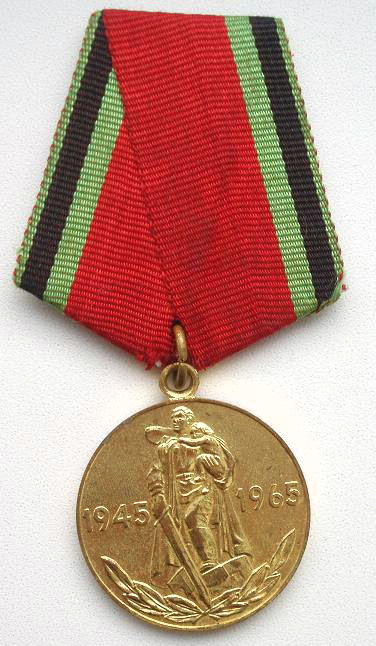
A jubilee medal awarded for parade participants in 1965.

=== Multiple columns ===
2008 marked a return to tradition as well as the reorganization of the parade to fit the modern era. For the first time, a mobile column appeared at a Victory Day Parade in the Russian Federation appeared, a return to a tradition that was last seen in 1991, and abandoned in 1995. It was abandoned due to reconstruction of the Iberian Gate and Chapel, which was originally destroyed to fill the very purpose of making way for tanks during the mobile column of the parade. That same year an airshow was introduced and it also became the first major Russian military parade to be seen on worldwide television when RT carried a live broadcast of the parade for the first time.

=== MC ===
Since 2007, an MC has announced the parade. From 2007 to 2020 the MC was Yevgeny Khoroshevtsev, who also announced the protocol events for the President of the Russian Federation. The MC's booth is at the top of the stands. starting in 2021 the announcer was Khoroshevtsev's protégé, Anton Suntsov.

=== Parade cars ===
Prior to 1945, most were held on horseback. For the first time, a parade convertible was on Red Square in 1940. In the last pre-war parade, the armored vehicle column was led by the ZIS-102 phaeton, which was a roofless modification of the ZIS-101 limousine. It was then that the proposal was to change from horses to cars came about, to which Stalin was firmly opposed, saying "Let's not change the good tradition of the Soviet army". Therefore, the first Victory Parade was inspected with the Marshal in a stallion named Idol. Cars replaced horses at military parades in 1953, the year of Stalin's death. The main vehicle then was the ZIS-110B, which was developed during the war was used. In Moscow, the convertible took part in parades until 1980 and also drove along the Palace Square in St. Petersburg until 2008. In 1981, the ZIL-115V was introduced, with three convertibles being built at the Likhachev Plant to participate in parades. It took part in military parades (including Victory Parades) on Red Square until 2009. In 2019, the ZILs were replaced by a specialized armored convertibles of an Aurus Senat.

The role of driving these cars is afforded to two personnel of the 147th Automobile Base.

=== Historical column ===
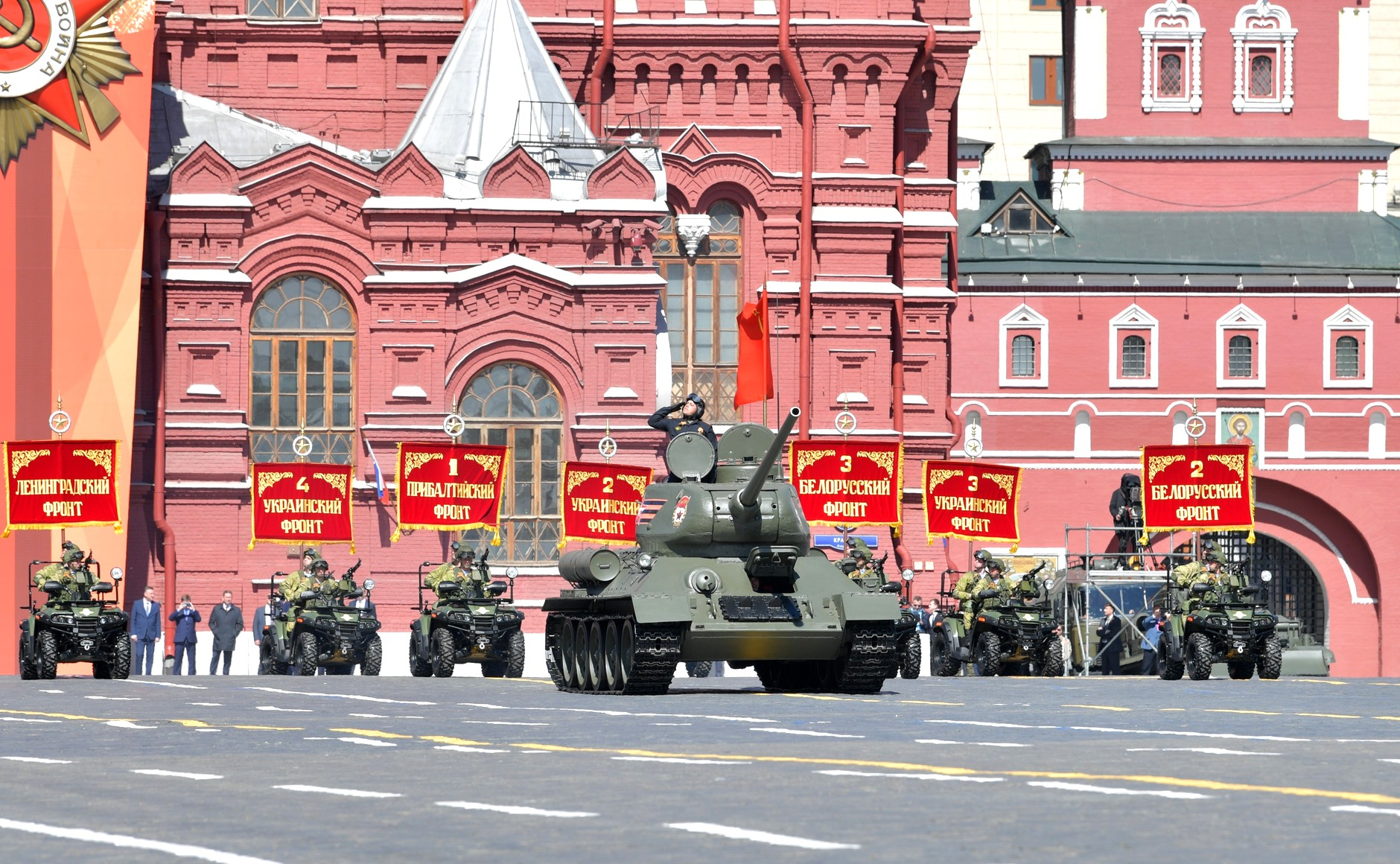
The mobile historical column during the 2018 Moscow Victory Day Parade.

Particularly on jubilee years, a historical column of troops takes part in the parade. It is designed to portray troops and their uniforms dating back to the war era. In 2005, the historical column wore replica uniforms similar to those worn in the 1945 Victory Parade.

==== Order of march past of historical column in major jubilee parades (order as of 2005, 2015 and 2020) ====
- Infantry of the Red Army
- Tank forces
- Artillery
- Engineering formations
- Reconnaissance and commando formations
- K-9 units of NKVD
- Soviet Air Force
- Soviet Navy
- Partisans in combat uniforms
- Border guardsmen
- Personnel of the Militia
- Kuban and Don Cossacks
- Servicemen who took part in the Victory Parade of 1945
- 1st Cavalry Squadron, Presidential Cavalry Escort Battalion, Kremlin Regiment

=== Challenge Cups ===
In 2021, the first ceremony of presenting challenge cups to the best participants in the military parade took place in the hall of the Military Council of the Main Command of the Ground Forces. The awards were held in 9 nominations:

- The best parade crew
- The best company of the parade crew
- The best parade crew of higher military educational institutions of the Ministry of Defence of the Russian Federation
- The best parade crew of pre-university educational organizations
- The best parade crew of formations and military units Of the Armed Forces of the Russian Federation
- The best parade crew of the ministries and departments of the Russian Federation
- The best parade crew of female military personnel
- The best parade crew of a mechanized column
- The best crew of a mechanized column

In addition, different cups are awarded to the parade crew of the Yunarmiya and the 2nd company of female military personnel. This ceremony is planned to be held annually and the challenge cups are kept permanently at the Office of the Military Commandant of Moscow.

=== Other aspects ===
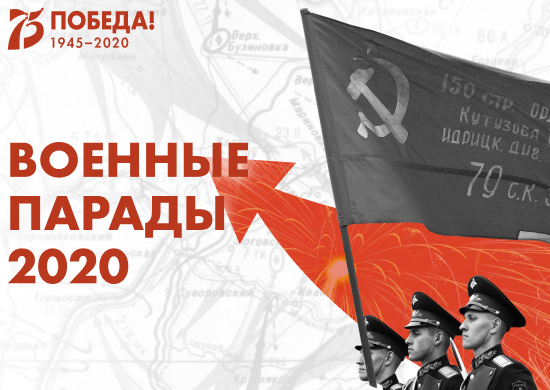
The 2020 parade banner from the Russian Defence Ministry.

Since August 2010, when the icon of Smolensk Saviour was uncovered and restored above the tower, the parade inspector, if holding military rank, has had to remove his headgear and cross himself before the inspection of troops during all Victory Day Parades. Each of the contingents, since 1996, have carried the historical military colors of the 1942 (Red Army, Soviet Air Force, NKVD Border Troops and Police, People's Militia) and 1932/1944 (Soviet Navy) patterns at the head of their formations, honoring the millions of who served in the ranks of the military and law enforcement services of the former Soviet Union during the Second World War. In 2018, an exhibition drill performance by the 1st Honor Guard Company, 154th Preobrazhensky Independent Commandant's Regiment took part in the finale segment of the parade together with a drumline from the Moscow Military Music College the first time since 2007 in a return to a tradition that began in the 2001 parade. It was reinstated in honor of the centennial anniversary of the 1918 foundation of the Red Army. Since the 60th anniversary parade, a wreath laying ceremony is held immediately after the parade at the Tomb of the Unknown Soldier, with a mini parade of the uniformed services and an honour guard also taking place.

== Massed bands ==
Around 1,100 bandsmen of the massed bands under the direction of the Senior Director of Music of the Military Band Service of the Armed Forces of Russia (an appointment bestowed to either a colonel or a general rank officer), are a central part of the parade. Between 15 and 40 bands are usually available for the march pasts. The combined band includes more than 40 ensembles from Moscow, St. Petersburg, Vladivostok, Kaliningrad, Kostroma. The massed military Bands in attendance are normally composed of:

- Headquarters Band of the Moscow Military District
- Central Military Band of the Ministry of Defense of Russia
- Headquarters Band, of the National Guard of Russia
- Band of the Dzerzhinsky Division
- Central Navy Band of Russia
- Band of the Moscow Military Conservatoire, Military University of the Ministry of Defence of the Russian Federation
- HQ Band of the Ministry of Emergency Situations
- Band of the Combined Arms Academy of the Armed Forces of the Russian Federation
- Band of the Military Technological University
- Band of the Peter the Great Military Academy of the Rocket Forces of Strategic Importance
- Band of the 5th Tamanskaya Guards Ind. Motor Rifle Brigade "Mikhail Kalinin"
- Band of the 4th Kantemir Guards Armored Brigade "Yuri Andropov"
- Band of the 27th Guards Motor Rifle Brigade
- Band of the Zhukovsky – Gagarin Air Force Academy
- Headquarters Band of the Russian Airborne Troops
- Band of the 147th Automobile Base of the Ministry of Defence

At the end of the year, the traditional repertoire instruction is held with the leaders of the military bands who will participate in the anniversary parade. For each piece, it is explained what and where to focus on during the performance.

== Foreign presence ==
=== Guests ===
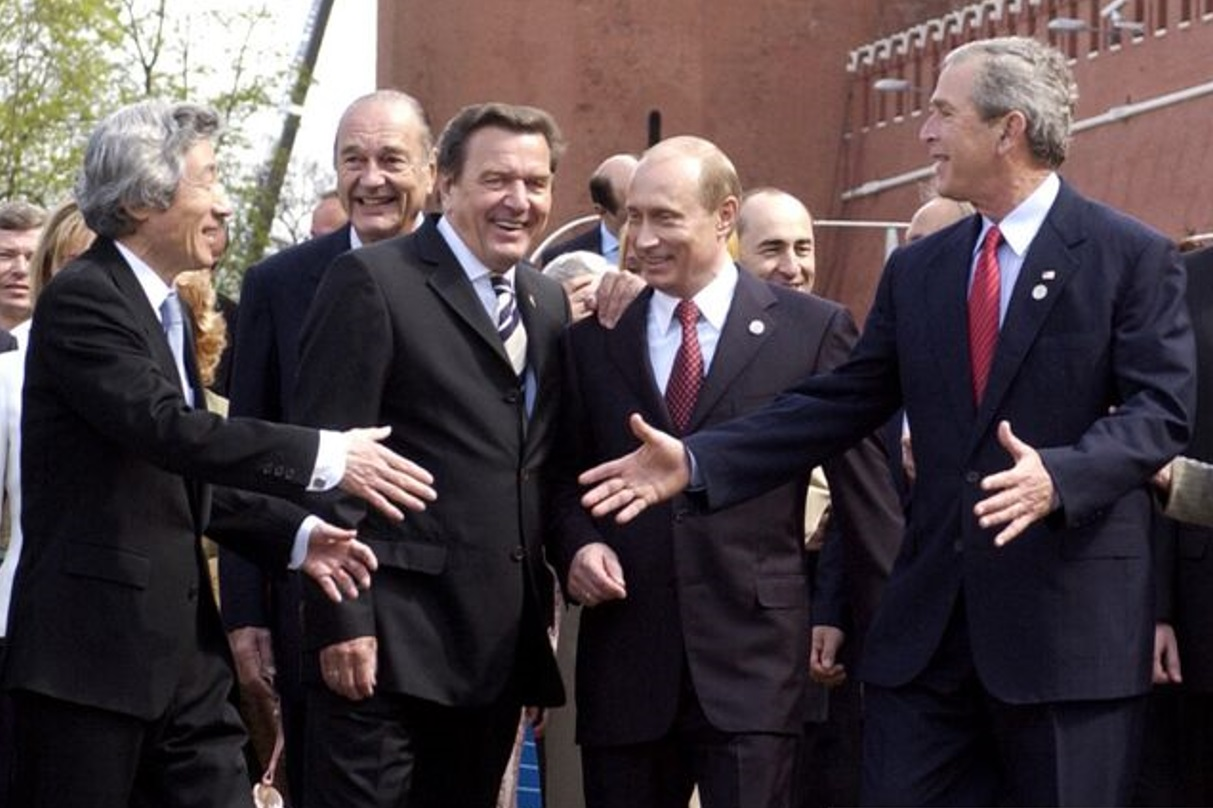
Putin with George W. Bush, Gerhard Schröder, Jacques Chirac and Junichiro Koizumi during the Victory Day Parade in Moscow on 9 May 2005

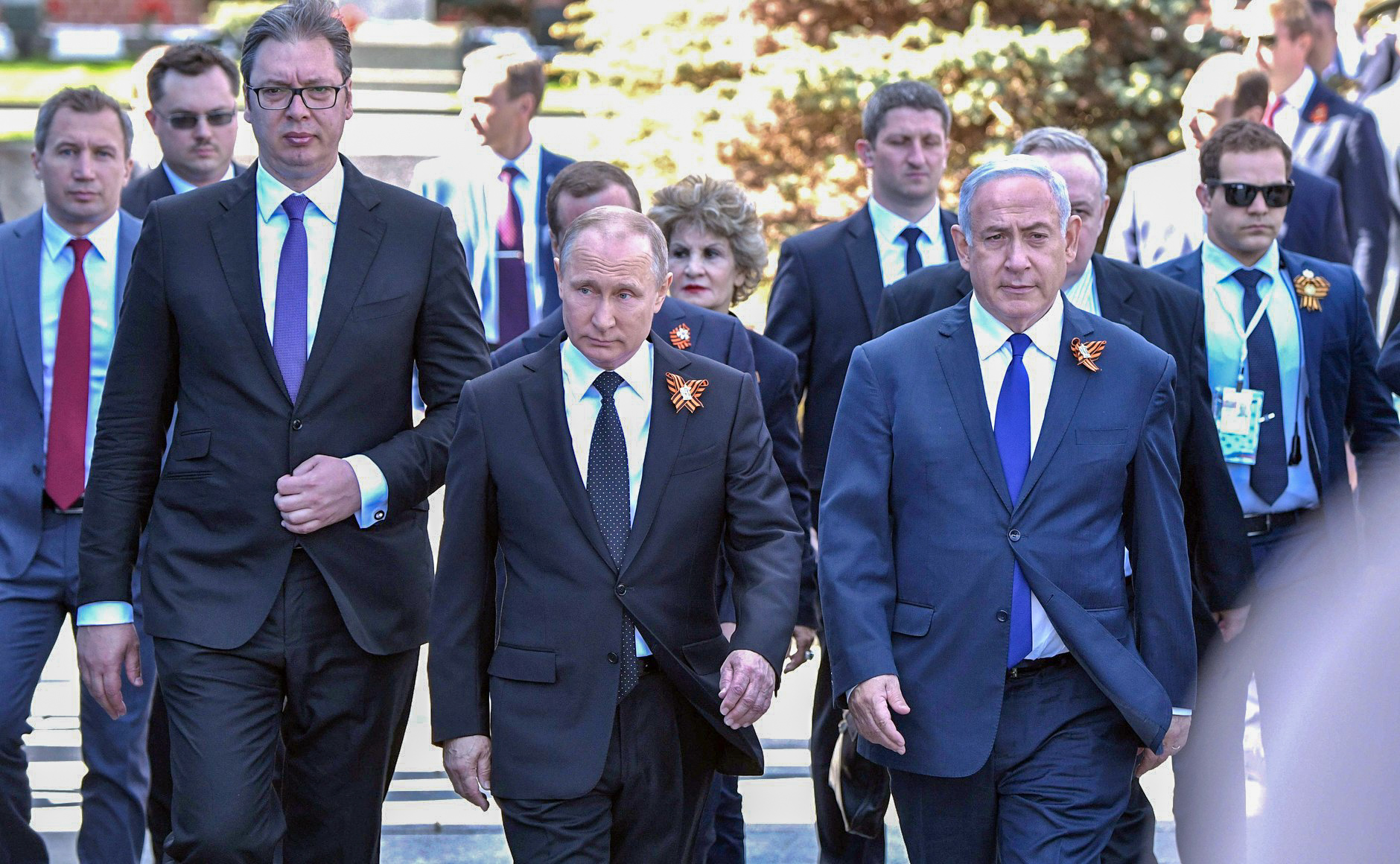
Putin with Serbian President Aleksandar Vučić and Israeli Prime Minister Benjamin Netanyahu on 9 May 2018

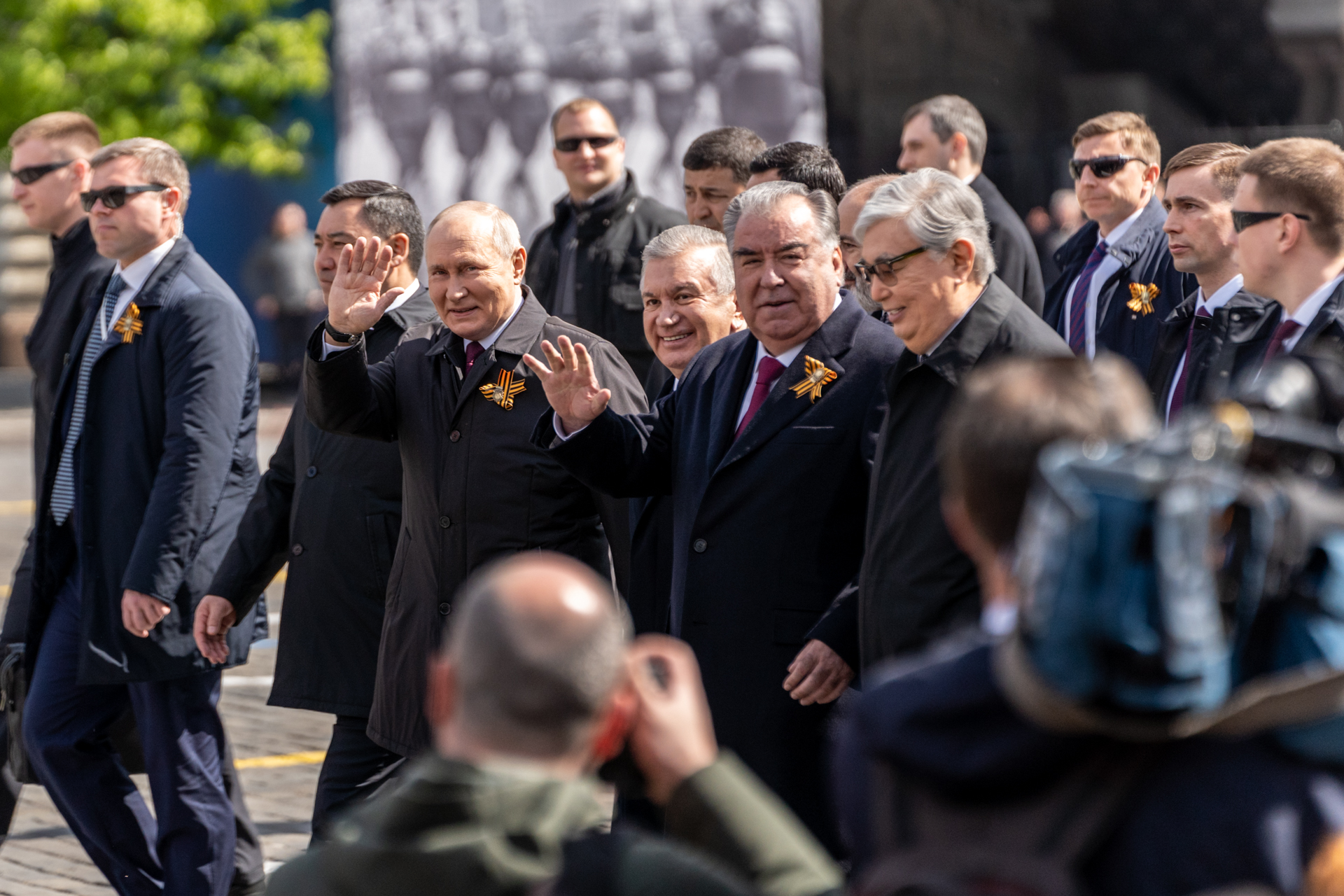
Putin and post-Soviet leaders from Central Asia at the 2023 Moscow Victory Day Parade

The act of inviting foreign leaders to the parade has been a jubilee tradition since 1995, with the exception of 2000.

- 1965 – Prime Minister of East Germany Willi Stoph
- 1995 – See 1995 Moscow Victory Day Parades
- 2005 – See 2005 Moscow Victory Day Parades
- 2010 – See 2010 Moscow Victory Day Parade
- 2015 – See 2015 Moscow Victory Day Parades
- 2016 – President of Kazakhstan Nursultan Nazarbayev
- 2017 – President of Moldova Igor Dodon
- 2018 – Prime Minister of Israel Benjamin Netanyahu and President of Serbia Aleksandar Vučić
- 2019 – Chairman of Security Council of Kazakhstan Nursultan Nazarbayev
- 2020 – See 2020 Moscow Victory Day Parade
- 2021 – President of Tajikistan Emomali Rahmon
- 2025 –See 2025 Moscow Victory Day Parade

=== Foreign troops ===
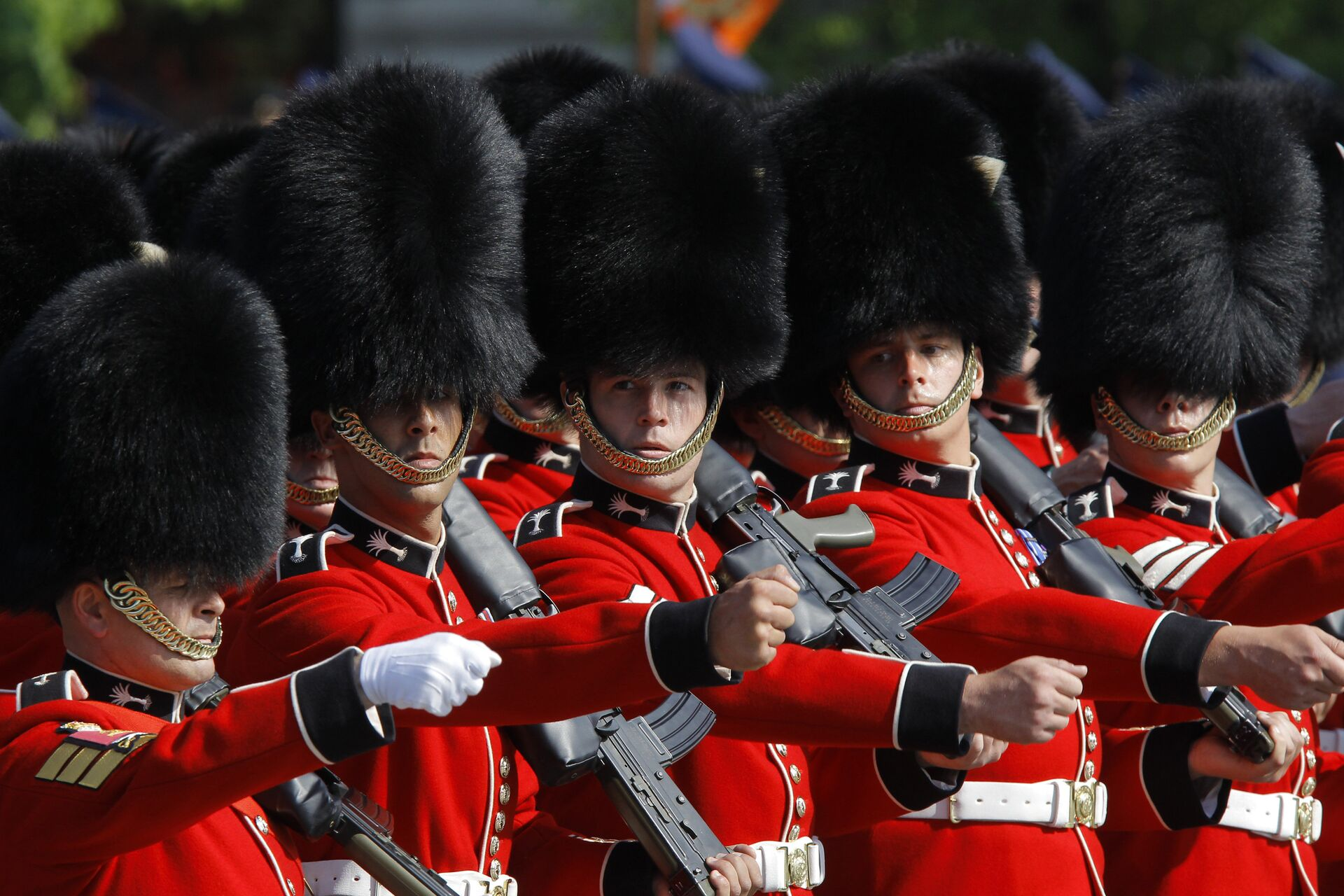
Members of the British detachment from No. 2 Company, 1st Battalion, Welsh Guards during the parade in 2010.

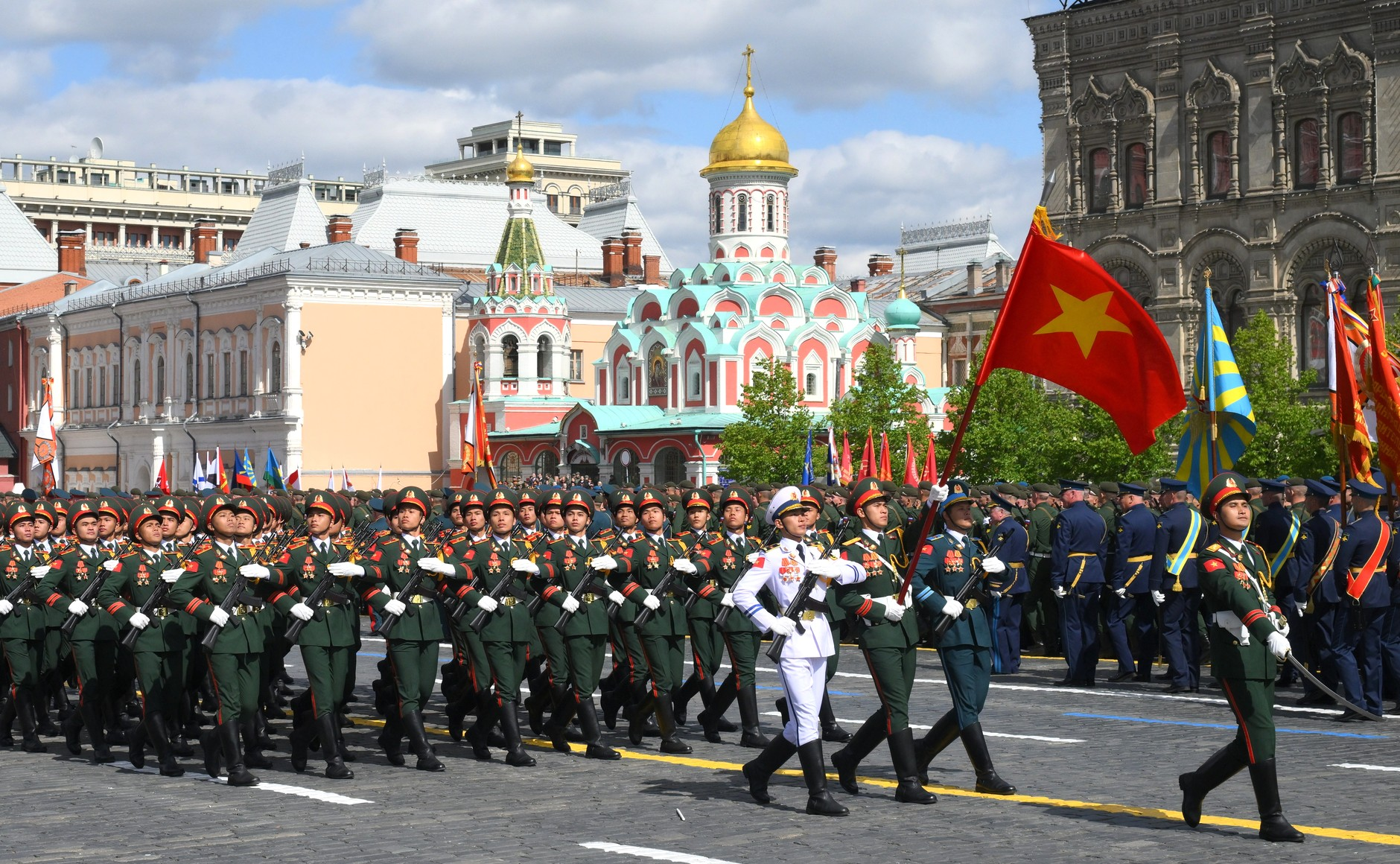
People's Army of Vietnam on Red Square at the 2025 Moscow Victory Day Parade

At the first parade in 1945, the color squad of the First Polish Army was the only foreign contingent invited to the ceremony. In 1985, veterans of the Polish People's Army (Polish 1st Infantry Division) and the Czechoslovak People's Army (Czechoslovak 1st Corps) took part in the veterans procession of the parade. In 2010, President Dmitry Medvedev invited foreign troops to the parade for the first time since the fall of the USSR, and included military units countries allied with the Soviet Union during World War II. Representation at the parade included contingents from France, Poland, the United Kingdom, the United States and other members of the Commonwealth of Independent States. Upon request from the Ministry of Defence of Turkmenistan, the Turkmen contingent was led by an officer on horseback, with the horse being flown into Moscow from Ashgabat. After a 5-year break, the platinum jubilee parade in 2015 saw the return of units from the CIS (save for Moldova and Ukraine) and saw parade participants from the Guard of the Serbian Armed Forces the Beijing Garrison Honor Guard Battalion of China, Mongolian State Honor Guard, and The Grenadiers. representing their countries for the first time. The 2020 parade saw the return of all participants of the 2015 parade (with most of the post-Soviet nations being represented by different units) as well as the return of Turkmenistan and Moldova, whose militaries returned after 10 years. Turkmen contingent for the 2020 parade consisted of two color guards (one carrying the Flag of Turkmenistan and the other carrying the combat flag of the 748th Infantry Regiment) riding in two GAZ-M20 Pobeda cars brought in from the Turkmen capital.

== List of parades ==
- 1945 Moscow Victory Parade
- 1965 Moscow Victory Day Parade
- 1985 Moscow Victory Day Parade
- 1990 Moscow Victory Day Parade
- 1995 Moscow Victory Day Parade
- 1996 Moscow Victory Day Parade
- 1997 Moscow Victory Day Parade
- 1998 Moscow Victory Day Parade
- 1999 Moscow Victory Day Parade
- 2000 Moscow Victory Day Parade
- 2001 Moscow Victory Day Parade
- 2002 Moscow Victory Day Parade
- 2003 Moscow Victory Day Parade
- 2004 Moscow Victory Day Parade
- 2005 Moscow Victory Day Parade
- 2006 Moscow Victory Day Parade
- 2007 Moscow Victory Day Parade
- 2008 Moscow Victory Day Parade
- 2009 Moscow Victory Day Parade
- 2010 Moscow Victory Day Parade
- 2011 Moscow Victory Day Parade
- 2012 Moscow Victory Day Parade
- 2013 Moscow Victory Day Parade
- 2014 Moscow Victory Day Parade
- 2015 Moscow Victory Day Parade
- 2016 Moscow Victory Day Parade
- 2017 Moscow Victory Day Parade
- 2018 Moscow Victory Day Parade
- 2019 Moscow Victory Day Parade
- 2020 Moscow Victory Day Parade
- 2021 Moscow Victory Day Parade
- 2022 Moscow Victory Day Parade
- 2023 Moscow Victory Day Parade
- 2024 Moscow Victory Day Parade
- 2025 Moscow Victory Day Parade
- 2026 Moscow Victory Day Parade

== See also ==
- Victory Day (9 May)
- Victory Parade
- Victory Day Parades
- List of October Revolution Parades in Moscow
- Culture of the Russian Armed Forces
