= 2011 Moscow Victory Day Parade =

Russian military parade

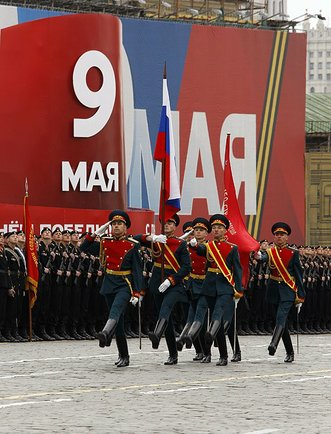
A color guard during the parade.

The 2011 Moscow Victory Day Parade was an event held on 9 May 2011 to commemorate the 66th anniversary of the capitulation of Nazi Germany in 1945. The parade marked the Soviet Union's victory in the Great Patriotic War. 20,000 soldiers and officers representing all three services of the Armed Forces of the Russian Federation, the Ministry of Internal Affairs, the Federal Security Service, and the Ministry of Emergency Situations took part in the parade, followed by +100 military vehicles and 5 Mil Mi-8 Hip helicopters.

Minister of Defence Anatoly Serdyukov was the parade inspector while Colonel General Valery Gerasimov, the then Deputy Chief of the General Staff was the parade commander. For the first time, the new battledress duty uniforms were worn by almost all the parading units. A year later, due to the massive unpopularity of the uniforms, it was reverted to the old style.

== Music ==
Music was performed by the massed bands of the Moscow Garrison, commanded by Lieutenant General Valeriy Khalilov.

Inspection of Troops

- Sacred War ("Священная война") by Aleksandr Aleksandrov
- March of the Life-Guard Preobrazhensky Regiment ("Марш Лейб-гвардии Преображенского полка")
- Slow March for Carrying Out the Combat Banner ("Встречный Марш для выноса Боевого Знамени") Dmitriy Kadeyev
- Slow March of the Officers Schools (Встречный Марш офицерских училищ) by Semyon Tchernetsky
- Guards Slow March of the Navy (Гвардейский Встречный Марш Военно-Морского Флота") by Nikolay Ivanov-Radkevich
- Slow March of the Tankmen (Встречный Марш Танкистов) by Semyon Tchernetsky
- Slow March (Встречный Марш) by Dmitriy Pertsev
- Slow March (Встречный марш) by Yevgeniy Aksyonov
- Slav'sya ("Славься") by Mikhail Glinka
- Parade Fanfare All Listen! (Парадная Фанфара “Слушайте все!”) by Andrey Golovin

Speech by President of the Russian Federation, Dmitriy Medvedev

- State Anthem of the Russian Federation ("Государственный гимн Российской Федерации") by Aleksandr Aleksandrov
- Signal Retreat ("Сигнал Отбой")

Infantry Column

- Drum and Fife based on the theme from the March "General Miloradovich" (Марш "Генерал Милорадович") by Valeriy Khalilov
- Triumph of the Winners (Триумф Победителей)
- Air March ("Авиaмарш") by Yuriy Khayt
- The Crew is One Family (Экипаж - одна семья) by Viktor Pleshak
- March of the Artillerymen ("Марш артиллеристов") by Tikhon Khrennikov
- I Believe, My Friends ("Я верю, друзья") by Oskar Fel'tsman
- We Need One Victory ("Нам нужна одна Победа") by Bulat Okudzhava
- We are the Army of the People (Мы Армия Народа) by Georgy Mavsesya
- To Serve Russia ("Служить России") by Eduard Khanok
- On Guard for Peace ("На страже Мира") by Boris Diyev
- March Kant (Марш "Кант") by Valeriy Khalilov
- Phalanx March ("Строевой Марш") by Dmitriy Pertsev
- March Victory Day (Марш "День Победы") by David Tukhmanov
- Drum and Fife based on the theme from the March "General Miloradovich" ("Тема из Марша Генерал Милорадович") by Valeriy Khalilov

Mobile and Air Column

- March Hero ("Марш Герой")
- Katyusha ("Катюша") by Matvey Blanter
- March of the Tankmen (Марш Танкистов) by Semyon Tchernetsky

Conclusion of the Parade

- Bow to Those Great Years (Поклонимся Великим тем годам) by Aleksandra Pakhmutova
- Farewell of Slavianka (Прощание Славянки) by Vasiliy Agapkin

== Gallery ==
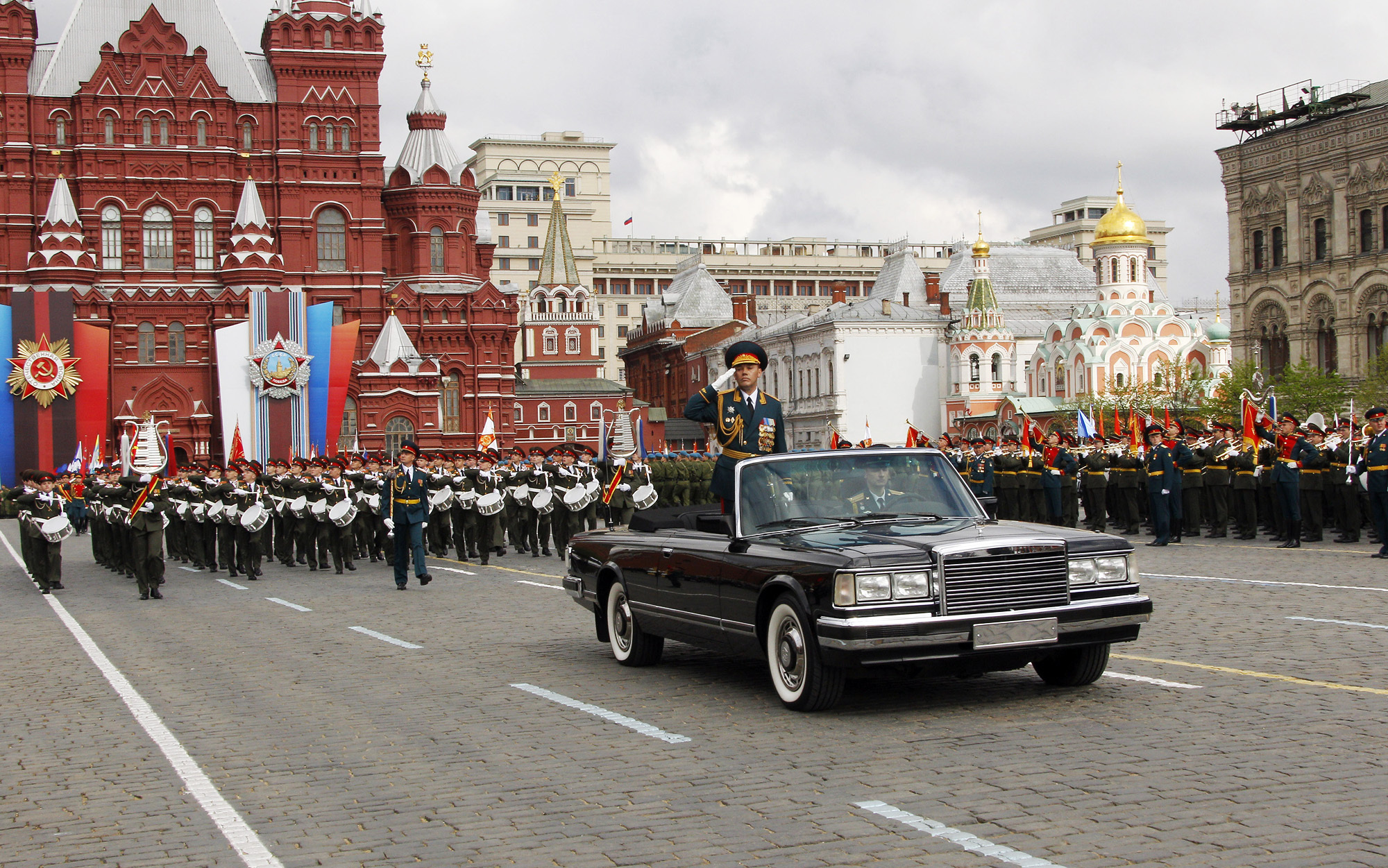

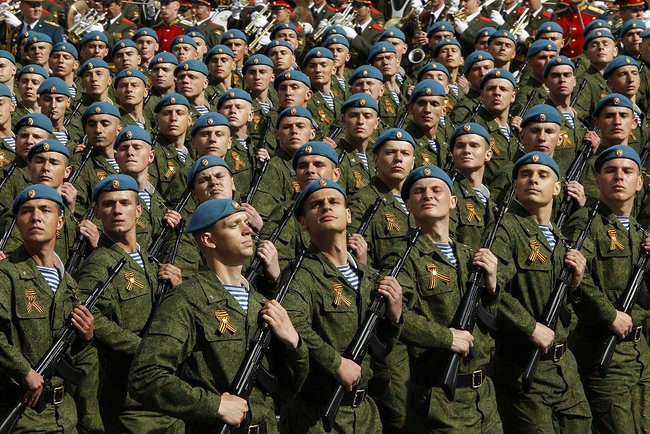

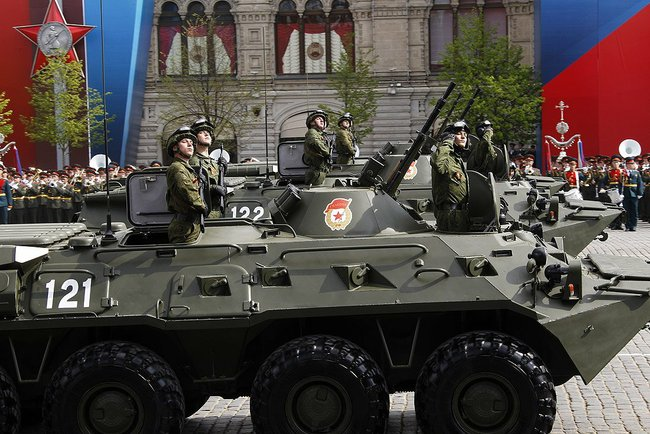
BTR-80

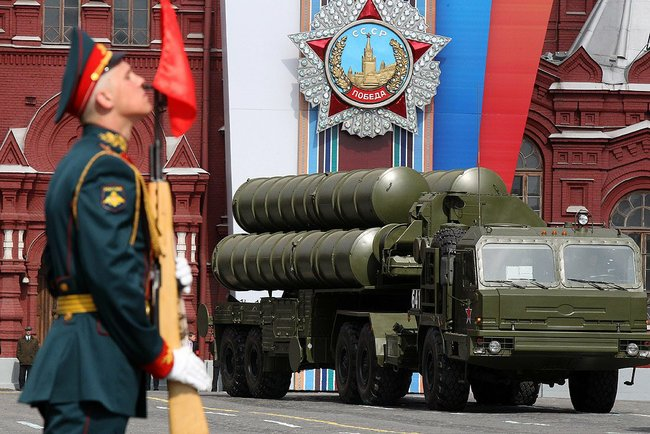
S-400

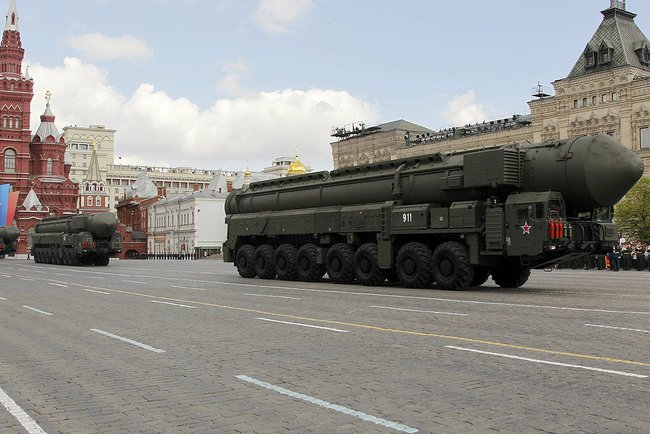
Topol-M

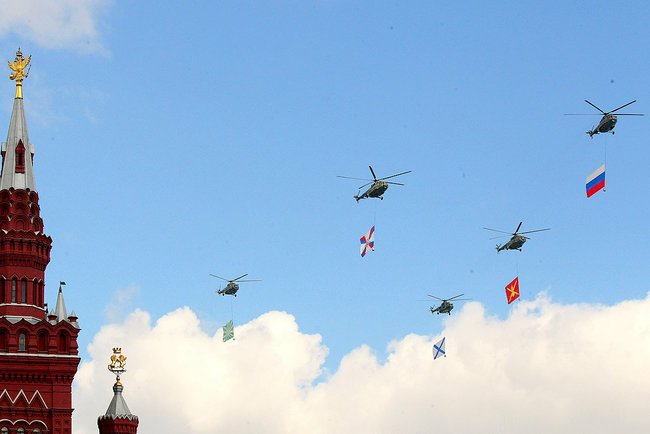
Mi-8 helicopters
