= 1997 Moscow Victory Day Parade =

Russian military parade

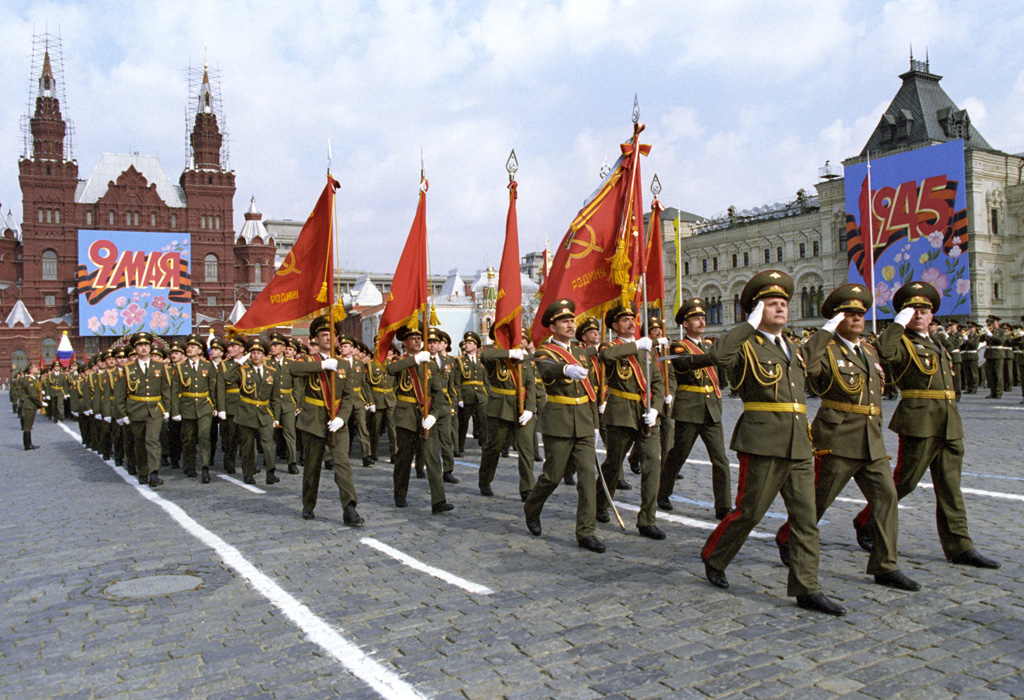
A military academy on Red Square.

The 1997 Moscow Victory Day Parade was a parade held in Red Square on 9 May 1997 to commemorate the 52nd anniversary of the capitulation of Nazi Germany in 1945. The annual parade marks the Allied victory in the Great Patriotic War on the same day as the signing of the German act of capitulation to the Allies in Berlin, at midnight 9 May 1945 (Russian time).

Together with the Supreme Commander of Russian Armed Forces, President of Russia Boris Yeltsin, Prime Minister Viktor Chernomyrdin, Moscow Mayor Yuri Luzhkov, the Russian army generals and other officials stood on a temporary grandstand, erected in front of Lenin's Mausoleum. The parade was attended by 5,000 officers and men, the parade went off without a demonstration of military equipment. The parade commander was deputy commander of the Moscow Military District, Lieutenant-General Igor Puzanov. Passage of the troops took 20 minutes.

== See also ==
- Moscow Victory Parade of 1945
- Victory Day (9 May)
