= 1996 Moscow Victory Day Parade =

Russian military parade

The 1996 Moscow Victory Day Parade was a parade held in Red Square on 9 May 1996 to commemorate the 51st anniversary of the capitulation of Nazi Germany in 1945. The annual parade marks the Allied victory in the Great Patriotic War on the same day as the signing of the German act of capitulation to the Allies in Berlin, at midnight 9 May 1945 (Russian time). The Supreme Commander of Russian Armed Forces, President of Russia Boris Yeltsin, Prime Minister Viktor Chernomyrdin, Moscow Mayor Yuri Luzhkov, as well as government officials stood on the grandstand of Lenin's Mausoleum. It would be the last time the Mausoleum would be used in a Moscow parade. The parade commander was the commander of the Moscow Military District, Colonel-General Leonid Kuznetsov. The parade was inspected by the Defense Minister of Russia, General of the Army Pavel Grachev. 7,370 military personnel took part in the parade. Military equipment did not participate in the parade. The parade is also the first time the Victory Banner has trooped on Red Square before the parade.

== See also ==
- Moscow Victory Parade of 1945
- Victory Day (9 May)
