= 2022 Moscow Victory Day Parade =

Russian military parade

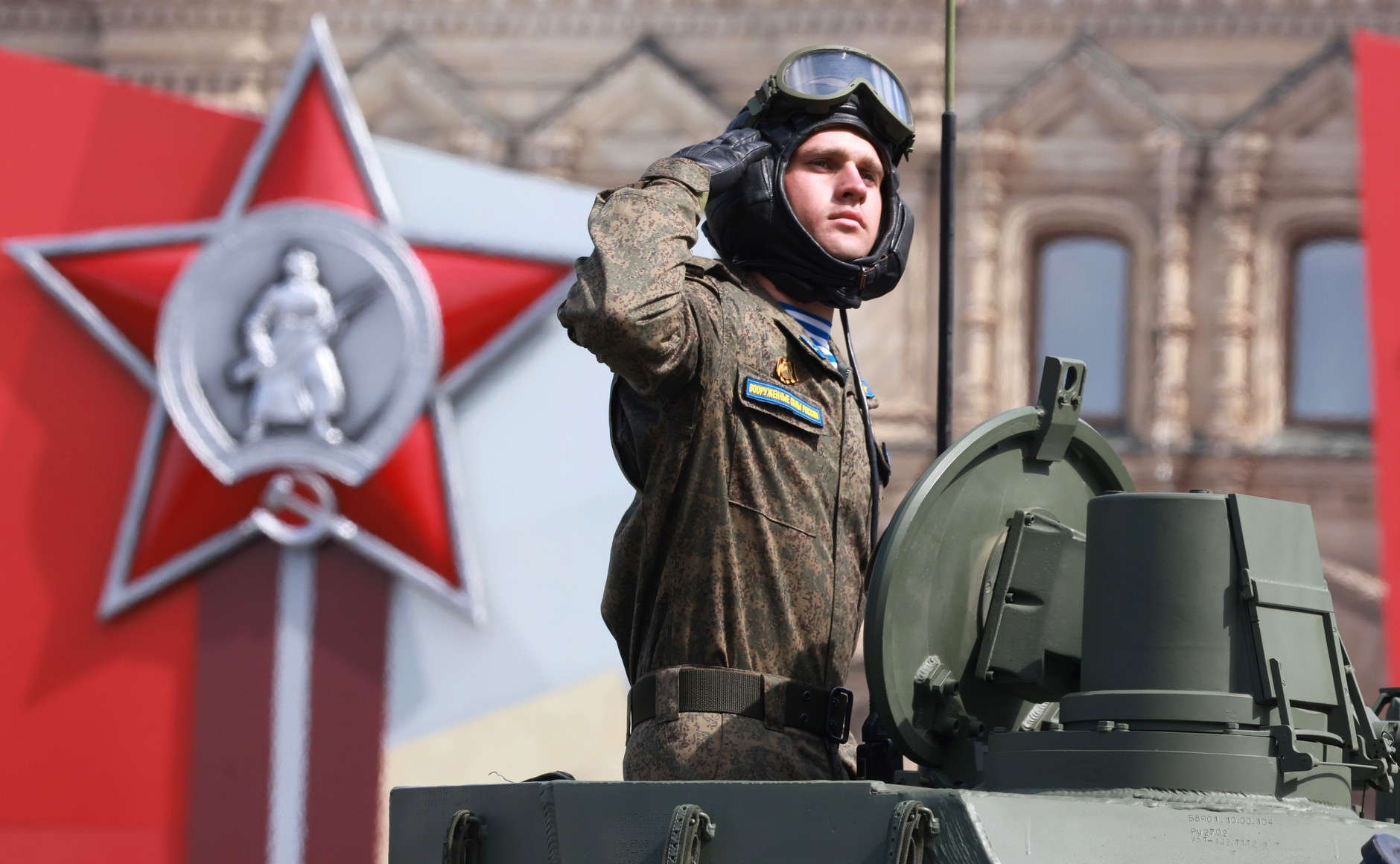
A tank commander saluting during the 2022 parade in Red Square, Moscow

The 2022 Moscow Victory Day Parade was held in Moscow's Red Square on 9 May 2022.

== Events ==
=== Background ===
The parade was organised to commemorate the 77th anniversary of both the capitulation of Nazi Germany in the Second World War in 1945 and the historic Moscow Victory Parade of 1945.

=== Parade and situation ===
The parade took place amid the backdrop of 2022 Russian invasion of Ukraine. The parade was not broadcast on some platforms outside of Russia due to social media boycotts and sanctions in response to the invasion.

Within Russia, anti-war slogans appeared on Russian satellite television as well as on Lenta.ru, a pro-government news website, on Victory Day.

According to the Russian state-owned TASS news agency, a number of foreign envoys from the Middle East and Africa attended the ceremony. Rodion Miroshnik, the ambassador to Russia from the Luhansk People's Republic (a pro-Russian breakaway region of Ukraine's Donbas region), addressed the crowd in Red Square.

=== Speculations ===
There was some speculation that Vladimir Putin would use the occasion to make a formal declaration of war on Ukraine, but this did not occur.

=== Putin's speech ===
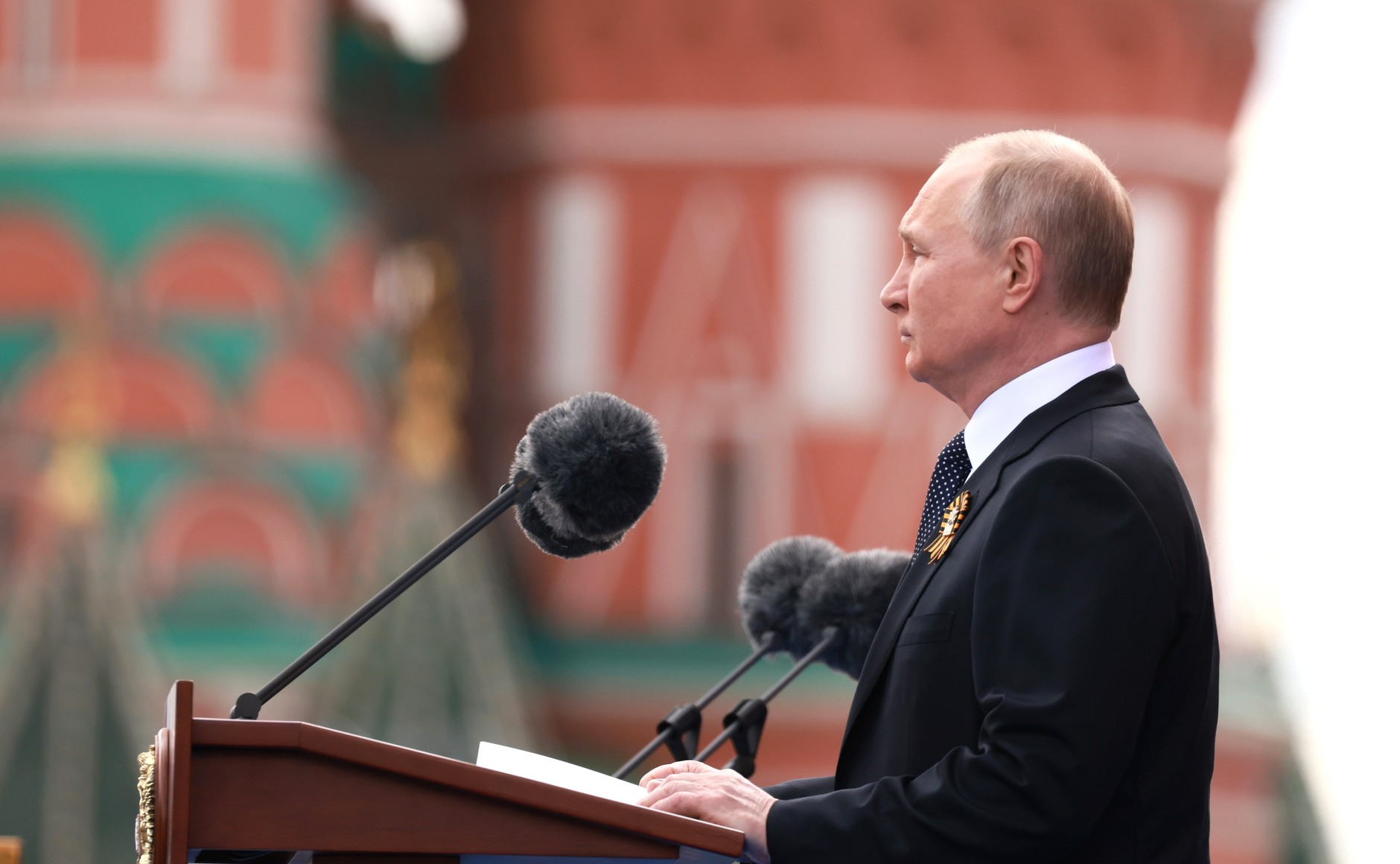
Russian president Vladimir Putin speaking at the parade

The Russian president Vladimir Putin gave a speech at the parade. The speech did not give any specifics regarding the 2022 Russian invasion of Ukraine, and also did not refer to Ukraine by name in his speech. Putin condemned the Ukrainian government, the West and NATO, blaming their alleged aggressive actions for Russia's invasion and saying that NATO and the West was using Ukraine as a proxy to attack Russia. He also drew parallels between the current Ukrainian government and that of Nazi Germany, praising Russia's military, saying that present troops were "fighting for the motherland, for her future, and so that nobody forgets the lessons of World War II".

== Full order of the 2022 parade ==
Bold indicates first appearance, italic indicates multiple appearances, Bold and italic indicate returning appearance, all indicated unless otherwise noted.

- General of the Army Sergey Shoigu, Minister of Defense of the Russian Federation (parade reviewing inspector)
- General of the Army Oleg Salyukov, Commander-in-Chief of the Russian Ground Forces (parade commander)

=== Mobile column ===
- T-34/85 medium tank
- GAZ-233114 "Tigr-M" infantry mobility vehicle
- BMP Kurganets-25 IFV
- BMP-2 infantry fighting vehicle
- BMP-3 infantry fighting vehicle
- T-72B3M (T-72B4) modernized main battle tank
- T-14 main battle tank
- Buk-M3 mobile tracked SAM system
- Tor-M2 SAM complex on tracked chassis
- S-400 Triumf SAM launch system on 5P85SM2-01 transporter-erector launcher
- 9K720 Iskander-M mobile tactical ballistic missile system
- RS-24 Yars ICBM on 15U175M wheeled transporter-erector launcher
- Kamaz 53949 Typhoon-K light MRAP
- Tornado-G Multiple Rocket Launcher Vehicle
- Uran-9 tracked unmanned ground combat vehicle (UCGV)

=== Air fly-past column ===
The air fly-past column was ostensibly cut from the 2022 Victory Day Parade due to weather, despite the ground portion of the parade taking place with good visibility and somewhat cloudy skies.

== See also ==
- Moscow Victory Parade of 1945
- Victory Day (9 May)
- Victory in Europe Day
- Victory Day Parades
