= 2001 Moscow Victory Day Parade =

Russian military parade

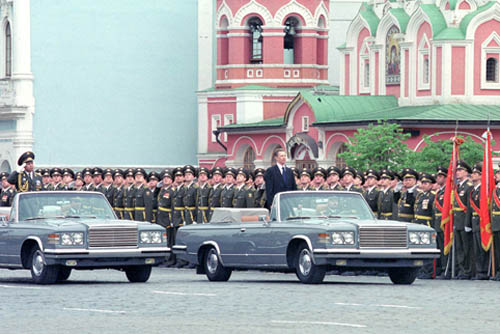
Defense Minister Sergei Ivanov inspecting the troops participating in the victory parade.

The 2001 Moscow Victory Parade was a celebration of the 56th anniversary of the defeat of Nazi Germany in the Great Patriotic War. The commander of the parade was the acting head of the Moscow Garrison Colonel General Nikolai Makarov. Reviewing the parade was Minister of Defence Sergei Ivanov.

Music was performed by the Moscow Garrison's Central Orchestra under Lieutenant General Viktor Afanasyev.

This was the first parade that was inspected by a civilian defense minister.

This parade is also the first time the Soviet-styled State Anthem of the Russian Federation was played since the anthem's last military parade performance in 1990.

== Parade formations ==
The car carrying the commander of the parade Colonel General Nikolai Makarov

- Corps of Drums of the Moscow Military Music College
- 154th Preobrazhensky Independent Commandant's Regiment
- Historical Units
- Military Academies
- Troops of the Ministry of Internal Affairs

== Music ==
Inspection and Address

- Potpourri of March of the Preobrazhensky Regiment (Марш Преображенского Полка) and Slow March of the Officers Schools (Встречный Марш офицерских училищ)
- Jubilee Slow March "25 Years of the Red Army" (Юбилейный встречный марш "25 лет РККА) by Semeon Tchernetsky
- Slow March of the Tankmen (Встречный Марш Танкистов) by Semyon Tchernetsky
- Slow March of the Guards of the Navy (Гвардейский Встречный Марш Военно-Морского Флота) by Nikolai Pavlocich Ivanov-Radkevich
- Slow March of the Officers Schools (Встречный Марш офицерских училищ) by Semyon Tchernetsky
- Slow March (Встречный Марш) by Dmitry Pertsev
- Slow March of the Red Army (Встречный Марш Красной Армии) by Semyon Tchernetsky
- March of the Preobrazhensky Regiment (Марш Преображенского Полка)
- Jubilee Slow March "25 Years of the Red Army" (Юбилейный встречный марш "25 лет РККА) by Semeon Tchernetsky
- Slow March of the Tankmen (Встречный Марш Танкистов) by Semyon Tchernetsky
- Slow March of the Guards of the Navy (Гвардейский Встречный Марш Военно-Морского Флота) by Nikolai Pavlocich Ivanov-Radkevich
- Slow March of the Officers Schools (Встречный Марш офицерских училищ) by Semyon Tchernetsky
- Slow March (Встречный Марш) by Dmitry Pertsev
- Slow March of the Red Army (Встречный Марш Красной Армии) by Semyon Tchernetsky
- March of the Preobrazhensky Regiment (Марш Преображенского Полка)
- Glory (Славься) by Mikhail Glinka
- Parade Fanfare All Listen! (Парадная Фанфара «Слушайте все!») by Andrei Golovin
- National Anthem of the Russian Federation (Государственный Гимн Российской Федерации) by Alexander Alexandrov
- Fanfare

Infantry Columns

- March Victory (Марш Победа) by Albert Mikhailovich Arutyunov
- In Defense of the Homeland (В защиту Родины) by Viktor Sergeyevich Runov
- On Guard for the Peace (На страже Мира) by Boris Alexandrovich Diev
- Combat March (Строевой Марш) by Dmitry Illarionovich Pertsev
- Air March (Авиамарш) by Yuliy Abramovich Khait
- We Need One Victory (Нам Нужна Одна Победа) by Bulat Shalvovich Okudzhava
- We are the Army of the People (Мы Армия Народа) by Georgy Viktorovich Mavsesya
- Sports March (Спортивный Марш) by Valentin Volkov
- On the Road (В Путь) by Vasily Pavlovich Solovyov-Sedoy
- Victory Day (День Победы) by David Fyodorovich Tukhmanov

Conclusion

- Song of the Russian Army (Песня о Российской Армии) by Alexandr Alexandrov
- March Parade (Марш Парад) by Semyon Tchernetsky
- In Defense of the Homeland (В защиту Родины) by Viktor Sergeyevich Runov
- On Guard for the Peace (На страже Мира) by Boris Alexandrovich Diev
- In Defense of the Homeland (В защиту Родины) by Viktor Sergeyevich Runov (repeat)
- On Guard for the Peace (На страже Мира) by Boris Alexandrovich Diev (repeat)
- We Need One Victory (Нам Нужна Одна Победа) by Bulat Shalvovich Okudzhava

== Gallery ==
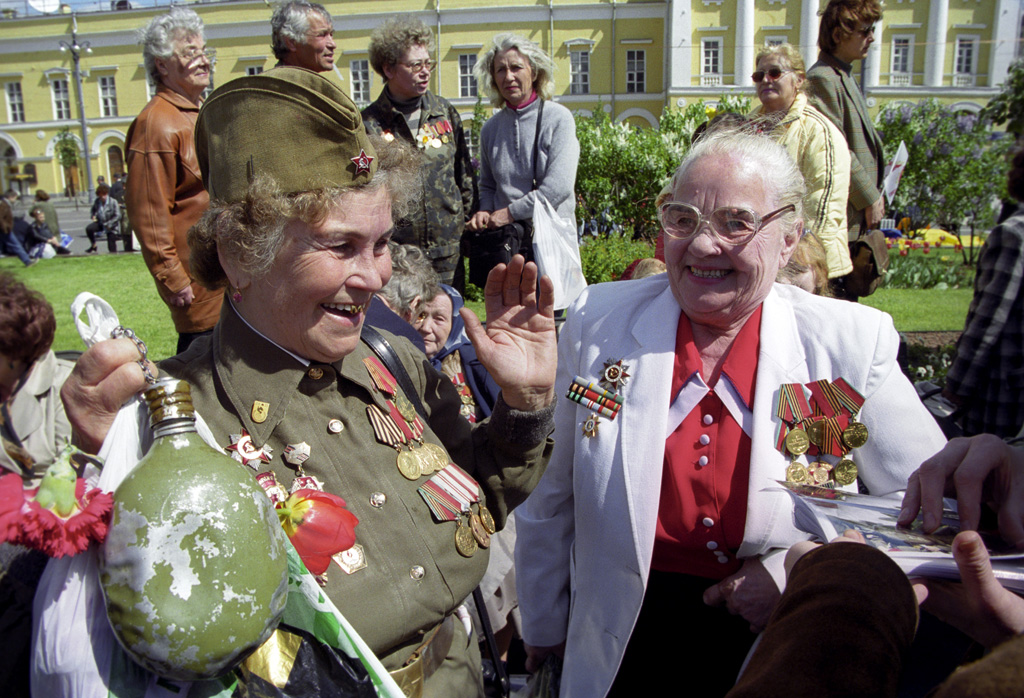

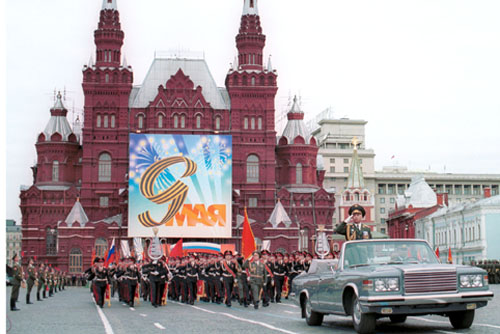

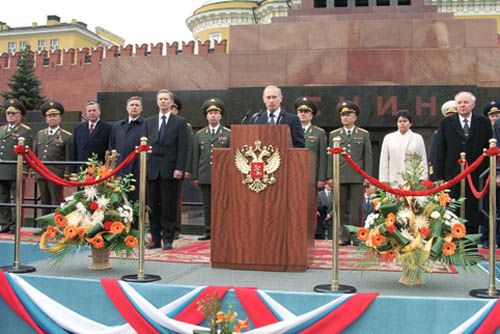

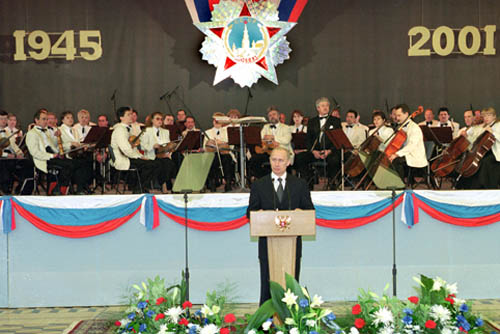

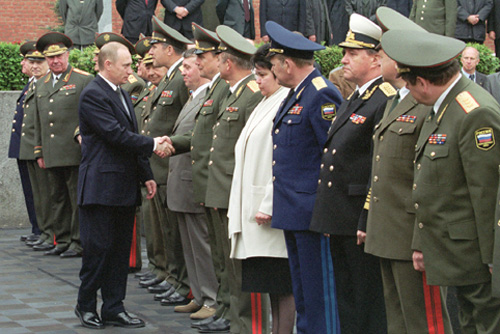

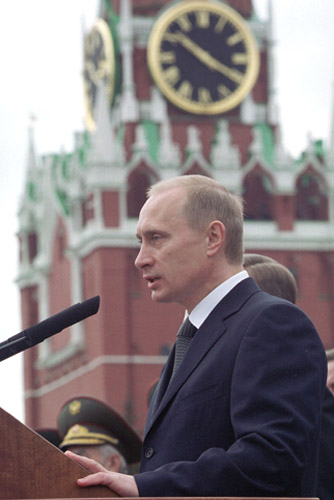
