= Slav'sya =

Russian song

- English: Glory; Славься
- Patriotic anthem and march of Russia and the Soviet Union
- Lyrics: Vasily Zhukovsky; Egor Rozen, 1836
- Music: Mikhail Glinka, 1836; 189 years ago

Audio sample
- Kremlin bell chimes play melody of the chorus "Glory" from the opera "A Life for the Tsar".: file; help

"Slav’sya!", (Russian: Славься!, romanized: Slavʹsya!) is the name of the final song in the epilogue of Mikhail Glinka's first opera A Life for the Tsar (1836) and now considered as one of Russia's greatest classical and patriotic anthems of the 19th century.

The original version of the song, written by Vasily Zhukovsky and Egor Fyodorovich Rozen, praised the Tsar and the Russian Tsardom, while the latter version by Sergey Gorodetsky was one of a patriotic form and is even sometimes regarded as a patriotic anthem of the Russia in the 20th century and today. It is one of the more popular pieces from the opera, which is performed during patriotic concerts by orchestras and traditional Russian and Soviet instrumental ensembles.

It has also been played by military bands and civil concert bands, using the arrangement composed by military composer Yevgeny Makarov for the Moscow Victory Parade of 1945 after World War II, and was also arranged for the Alexandrov Ensemble, which played it during their 2004 concert in the Vatican. While the modern version is the more commonly known version sung today, there have been also performances in which the original Imperial lyrics have been sung.

== Lyrics of the original Imperial version ==
=== Variant 1 ===
Славься, славься, нашъ русскiй Царь!
Господомъ данный намъ Царь-Государь!
Да будетъ безсмертенъ твой Царскiй родъ,
Да имъ благоденствуетъ русскiй народъ.

Славься, славься ты, Русь моя,
Славься ты, русская наша земля.
Да будетъ во вѣки вѣковъ сильна
Любимая наша родная страна.

Славься, славься изъ рода въ родъ,
Славься, великiй нашъ русскiй народъ.
Враговъ, посягнувшихъ на край родной,
Рази безпощадной могучей рукой.

Славься, славься, родная Москва,
Родины нашей, страны голова.
Живи, возвышайся на радость намъ,
На счастье народовъ, на гибель врагамъ.

Слава, слава героямъ-бойцамъ,
Родины нашей отважнымъ сынамъ.
Кто кровь за Отчизну свою прольетъ,
Того никогда не забудетъ народъ.

Слава, слава, греми, Москва!
Празднуй торжественный день Государя,
Ликуй, веселися: твой Царь грядетъ!
Царя-Государя встрѣчаетъ народъ.

Слава, слава нашему Царю!
Слава, слава земле родной!
Слава героямъ Руси Святой!
Ура! ура! ура!

=== Public performance lyrics ===
Original Russian

Славься, славься, наш русский Царь!
Господом данный нам Царь-Государь!
Да будет бессмертен твой Царский род!
Да им благоденствует русский народ!

Славься, славься, наш русский Царь!
Господом данный нам Царь-Государь!
Да будет бессмертен твой Царский род!
Да им благоденствует русский народ!

Славься, славься, наш русский Царь!
Господом данный нам Царь-Государь!
Да будет бессмертен твой Царский род!
Да им благоденствует русский народ!

Славься, славься, наш русский Царь!
Господом данный нам Царь-Государь!
Славься, славься!

Утешьтесь, вас Царь наградит,
И народ возгласит:
Память вовек Сусанину!

Славься, славься, наш русский Царь!
Господом данный нам Царь-Государь!
Славься, славься,
Слава Царю!

Вас Царь наградит,
И народ возгласит:
Память вовек Сусанину!

Слава нашему Царю,
Слава Руси святой,
Слава нашему Царю,
Слава, слава, греми, Москва!

Празднуй торжественный день Государя,
Ликуй, веселися: царский ход всё ближе!
Царь идёт,
Царь идёт,
Царь идёт!

Наш Царь идёт!

Слава нашему Царю,
Слава Руси святой,
Слава нашему Царю,
Слава, слава, греми, Москва!

Празднуй торжественный день Государя,
Ликуй, веселися: царский ход всё ближе!
Царь идёт,
Царь идёт,
идёт Царь!

Наш Царь идёт!
Наш Царь… идёт!

Слава нашему Царю!

Ура!
Ура!
Ура!

Transliteration

Slav’sya, slav’sya, nash russkiy Tsar’!
Gospodom dannyy nam Tsar’-Gosudar’!
Da budet bessmerten tvoy Tsarskiy rod!
Da im blagodenstvuet russkiy narod!

Slav’sya, slav’sya, nash russkiy Tsar’!
Gospodom dannyy nam Tsar’-Gosudar’!
Da budet bessmerten tvoy Tsarskiy rod!
Da im blagodenstvuet russkiy narod!

Slav’sya, slav’sya, nash russkiy Tsar’!
Gospodom dannyy nam Tsar’-Gosudar’!
Da budet bessmerten tvoy Tsarskiy rod!
Da im blagodenstvuet russkiy narod!

Slav’sya, slav’sya, nash russkiy Tsar’!
Gospodom dannyy nam Tsar’-Gosudar’!
Slav’sya, slav’sya!

Uteshtes’, vas Tsar’ nagradit,
I narod vozglasit:
Pamyat’ vovek Susaninu!

Slav’sya, slav’sya, nash russkiy Tsar’!
Gospodom dannyy nam Tsar’-Gosudar’!
Slav’sya, slav’sya!
Slava Tsaryu!

Vas Tsar’ nagradit,
I narod vozglasit:
Pamyat’ vovek Susaninu!

Slava nashemu Tsaryu,
Slava Rusi svyatoy,
Slava nashemu Tsaryu,
Slava, slava, gremi, Moskva!

Prazdnuy torzhestvennyy den’ Gosudarya,
Likuy, veselisya: tsarskiy khod vsyo blizhe!
Tsar’ idyot,
Tsar’ idyot,
Tsar’ idyot!

Nash Tsar’ idyot!

Slava nashemu Tsaryu,
Slava Rusi svyatoy,
Slava nashemu Tsaryu,
Slava, slava, gremi, Moskva!

Prazdnuy torzhestvennyy den’ Gosudarya,
Likuy, veselisya: tsarskiy khod vsyo blizhe!
Tsar’ idyot,
Tsar’ idyot,
Idyot Tsar’!

Nash Tsar’ idyot!
Nash Tsar’… idyot!

Slava nashemu Tsaryu!

Ura!
Ura!
Ura!

Translation

Glory, glory to our Russian Tsar!
The Tsar and Sovereign given to us by the Lord!
May your royal line be immortal!
May the Russian people prosper through it!

Glory, glory to our Russian Tsar!
The Tsar and Sovereign given to us by the Lord!
May your royal line be immortal!
May the Russian people prosper through it!

Glory, glory to our Russian Tsar!
The Tsar and Sovereign given to us by the Lord!
May your royal line be immortal!
May the Russian people prosper through it!

Glory, glory to our Russian Tsar!
The Tsar and Sovereign given to us by the Lord!
Glory, glory!

Take comfort, the Tsar will reward you,
And the people will proclaim:
“Forever remember Susanin!”

Glory, glory to our Russian Tsar!
The Tsar and Sovereign given to us by the Lord!
Glory, glory,
Glory to the Tsar!

The Tsar will reward you,
And the people will proclaim:
“Forever remember Susanin!”

Glory to our Tsar,
Glory to holy Rus’,
Glory to our Tsar,
Glory, glory, resound, Moscow!

Celebrate the solemn day of the Sovereign,
Rejoice, be glad: the Tsar’s procession is ever closer!
The Tsar is coming,
The Tsar is coming,
The Tsar is coming!

Our Tsar is coming!

Glory to our Tsar,
Glory to holy Rus’,
Glory to our Tsar,
Glory, glory, resound, Moscow!

Celebrate the solemn day of the Sovereign,
Rejoice, be glad: the Tsar’s procession is ever closer!
The Tsar is coming,
The Tsar is coming,
The Tsar is coming!

Our Tsar is coming!
Our Tsar… is coming!

Glory to our Tsar!

Hurrah!
Hurrah!
Hurrah!

== Lyrics of the post-Imperial version ==
Performance lyrics of abbreviated version as sung by the Alexandrov Ensemble:

=== Version 1 ===
Original Russian

Славься, славься, ты Русь моя,
Славься, ты русская наша земля!
Да будет во веки веков сильна
Любимая наша родная страна!

Будь жив, будь здрав, весь наш край!

Ура!
Ура!
Ура!

Transliteration

Slav’sya, slav’sya, ty Rus’ moya,
Slav’sya, ty russkaya nasha zemlya!
Da budet vo veki vekov sil'na
Lyubimaya nasha rodnaya strana!

Bud’ zhiv, bud’ zdrav, ves’ nash kray!

Ura!
Ura!
Ura!

Translation

Glory, glory to you, my Rus’,
Glory, you are our Russian Land.
Let it be forever strong
Our beloved home country.

Be alive, be sensible, our whole land!

Hurrah!
Hurrah!
Hurrah!

=== Version 2 ===
Original Russian

Славься, славься, ты Русь моя,
Славься, ты русская наша земля!
Да будет во веки веков сильна
Любимая наша родная страна!

Славься, славься из рода в род,
Славься великий наш русский народ!
Врагов посягнувших на край родной
Рази беспощадно могучей рукой!

Слава, слава героям бойцам
Родины нашей отважным сынам!
Слава! Хвала, хвала войскам!

Вот он, наш Кремль!
С ним вся Русь и весь мир!
Пой весь мир! Веселись,
Русский люд! Песни пой!
Светлый день, весёлый день для нас настал!
Весёлый день для нас настал!

Здравствуй, наш край!
Наш край родной!

Будь жив, будь здрав, весь наш край!

Ура!
Ура!
Ура!

Transliteration

Slav’sya, slav’sya, ty Rus’ moya,
Slav’sya, ty russkaya nasha zemlya!
Da budet vo veki vekov sil'na
Lyubimaya nasha rodnaya strana!

Slav’sya, slav’sya iz roda v rod,
Slav’sya velikiy nash russkiy narod!
Vragov posyagnuvshikh na kray rodnoy
Razi besposhchadno moguchey rukoy!

Slava, slava geroyam boytsam
Rodiny nashey otvazhnym synam!
Slava! Khvala, khvala voyskam!

Vot on, nash Kreml’!
S nim vsya Rus’ i ves’ mir!
Poy ves’ mir! Veselis’,
Russkiy lyud! Pesni poy!
Svetlyy den’, vesolyy den’ dlya nas nastal!
Vesolyy den’ dlya nas nastal!

Zdravstvuy, nash kray!
Nash kray rodnoy!

Bud’ zhiv, bud’ zdrav, ves’ nash kray!

Ura!
Ura!
Ura!

Translation

Glory, glory to you, my Rus’,
Glory, you are our Russian Land.
Let it be forever strong
Our beloved home country.

Glory, glory, from generation to generation,
Be glorious, our Great Russian People.
Enemies, encroached on Native land,
Strike down mercilessly with a mighty hand.

Glory, glory, Heroes of the soldiers,
The homeland of our brave sons.
Glory! Praise, praise to the troops!

Here it is, our Kremlin!
With him all Russia and the whole world!
Sing the whole world! Rejoice,
Russian people! Sing our songs!
Bright day, cheerful has come for us!
A joyful day has come for us!

Hail, our land!
Our native land!

Be alive, be sensible, our whole land!

Hurrah!
Hurrah!
Hurrah!

=== Version 3 ===
Original Russian

Славься, славься, ты Русь моя,
Славься, ты русская наша земля!
Да будет во веки веков сильна
Любимая наша родная страна!

Славься, славься из рода в род,
Славься великий наш русский народ!
Врагов посягнувших на край родной
Рази беспощадно могучей рукой!

Слава, слава героям бойцам
Родины нашей отважным сынам!
Кто кровь за Отчизну свою прольёт,
Того никогда не забудет народ.

Будь жив, будь здрав, весь наш край!

Ура!
Ура!
Ура!
Ура!

Transliteration

Slav’sya, slav’sya, ty Rus’ moya,
Slav’sya, ty russkaya nasha zemlya!
Da budet vo veki vekov sil’na
Lyubimaya nasha rodnaya strana!

Slav’sya, slav’sya iz roda v rod,
Slav’sya velikiy nash russkiy narod!
Vragov posyagnuvshikh na kray rodnoy
Razi besposhchadno moguchey rukoy!

Slava, slava geroyam boytsam
Rodiny nashey otvazhnym synam!
Kto krov’ za Otchiznu svoyu prol’yot,
Togo nikogda ne zabudet narod.

Bud’ zhiv, bud’ zdrav, ves’ nash kray!

Ura!
Ura!
Ura!
Ura!

Translation

Glory, glory to you, my Rus’,
Glory, you are our Russian Land.
Let it be forever strong
Our beloved home country.

Glory, glory, from generation to generation,
Be glorious, our Great Russian People.
Enemies, encroached on Native land,
Strike down mercilessly with a mighty hand.

Glory, glory, Heroes of the soldiers,
The homeland of our brave sons.
Whose blood shed for their Motherland,
That will never forgot the people.

Be alive, be sensible, our whole land!

Hurrah!
Hurrah!
Hurrah!
Hurrah!

== Use in other songs ==
Pyotr Ilyich Tchaikovsky's 1812 Overture contains a sample of God Save the Tsar!, the national anthem of the Russian Empire. However, during the Soviet era, this part was replaced with a sample of Slavsya. After the dissolution of the Soviet Union, the sample of the imperial anthem was restored.

In 2015, Oleg Gazmanov released his single, Vperyod – Rossiya! ("Forward – Russia!") and samples the first lines of Slavsya.
