= 2007 Moscow Victory Day Parade =

Russian military parade

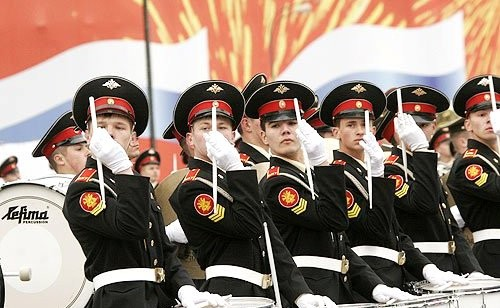
Cadet drummers during the parade.

The 2007 Moscow Victory Parade was a celebration of the 62nd anniversary of the defeat of Nazi Germany in the Great Patriotic War. It was the last time Vladimir Putin made a holiday address in his first term as president. The parade was commanded by the head of the Moscow Garrison General of the army Vladimir Bakin, and reviewing the parade was Minister of Defence Anatoliy Serdyukov. Music was performed by the Moscow Garrison's Central Orchestra under Major General Valery Khalilov.

This was the first parade that was watched by people online outside of Russia.

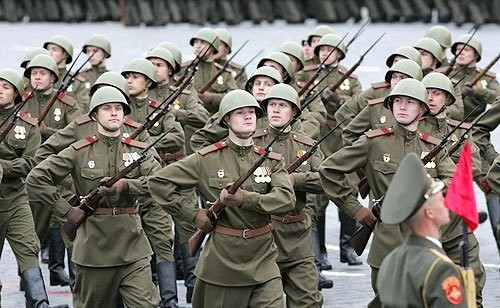
Historical troops during the parade

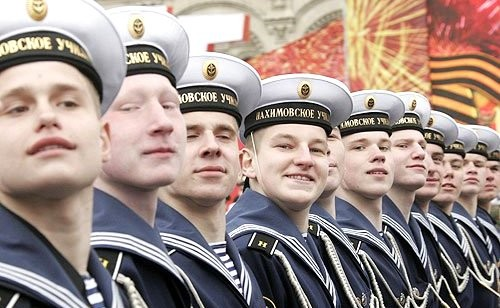
Naval cadets standing at attention.

== Parade Program ==
Note: Those indicated in bold indicate first parade appearance, those indicated with italic indicate double or multiple parade appearances.

- Colonel General Vladimir Bakin, Commander of the Moscow Military District (parade commander)
- Defense Minister of the Russian Federation Anatoliy Serdyukov (parade inspector)

=== Military Bands in Attendance ===
- Massed Military Bands of the Military Band Service of the Armed Forces of Russia led and conducted by Major General Valery Khalilov and composed of:
  - Headquarters Band of the Moscow Military District
  - Central Military Band of the MDRF
  - Band of the Moscow Military Conservatoire, Military University of the Ministry of Defense of the Russian Federation
- Corps of Drums of the Moscow Military Music College

=== Infantry Column ===
- 154th Moscow Garrison Commandant's Honor Guard Regiment and Color Guards
  - Colors Party composed of:
    - Flag of Russia
    - Victory Banner
    - Banner of the Armed Forces of the Russian Federation
  - Combined Honor Guard Company of the Armed Forces
- Historical units
  - Infantry
  - Airmen
  - Sailors
- Representative units of the Armed Forced, Ministry of Internal Affairs, Ministry of Emergency Situations and Civil Defense, Federal Security Service as well as units of the Moscow Military District
  - Combined Arms Academy of the Armed Forces of the Russian Federation
  - Peter the Great Military Academy of the Strategic Missile Forces
  - Military University of the Ministry of Defense of the Russian Federation
  - Gagarin Air Force Academy
  - Zhukovsky Air Force Engineering Academy
  - Civil Defense Academy of the Ministry of Emergency Situations of the Russian Federation
  - Military Technological University
  - Moscow Military Space Institute of Radio Electronics
  - Moscow Border Guards Institute of the Border Guard Service of the Federal Security Service of the Russian Federation "Moscow City Council"
  - 2nd Guards Motor Rifle Division
  - 4th Kantemir Guards Armored Brigade "Yuri Andropov"
  - 27th Sevastopol Guards Motor Rifle Brigade
  - Ryazan Airborne Command Academy "Gen. of the Army Vasily Margelov"
  - 331st Guards Airborne Regiment
  - ODON Ind. Motorized Internal Troops Division of the Ministry of Internal Affairs of the Russian Federation "Felix Dzerzhinsky"
  - 336th Separate Bialystok Guards Naval Infantry Brigade of the Baltic Fleet
  - Nakhimov Naval School
  - Suvorov Military School
  - Moscow Military Commanders Training School "Supreme Soviet of the RSFSR/Russian Federation"

Training for the parade took place from March to April in the Alabino, Moscow Oblast.

== Music ==
The music and marches were played by the Military Band of the Armed Forces of Russia under the direction of Major General Valery Khalilov

Inspection and Address

- March of the Life-Guard Preobrazhensky Regiment ("Марш Лейб-гвардии Преображенского полка")
- Slow March of the Tankmen (Встречный Марш Танкистов) by Semyon Chernetskiy
- Slow March for Carrying Out the Combat Banner ("Встречный Марш для выноса Боевого Знамени") Dmitriy Kadeyev
- Guards Slow March of the Navy (Гвардейский Встречный Марш Военно-Морского Флота") by Nikolay Ivanov-Radkevich
- Slow March of the Officers Schools (Встречный Марш офицерских училищ) by Semyon Chernetskiy
- Slow March (Встречный Марш) by Dmitriy Pertsev
- Slow March of the Red Army (Встречный Марш Красной Армии) by Semyon Chernetskiy
- Slow March (Встречный марш) by Yevgeniy Aksyonov
- Slav'sya ("Славься") by Mikhail Glinka
- Parade Fanfare All Listen! (Парадная Фанфара «Слушайте все!») by Andrey Golovin
- State Anthem of the Russian Federation (Государственный Гимн Российской Федерации) by Aleksandr Aleksandrov
- Signal Retreat (Сигнал "Отбой")

Infantry Column

- Drum and Fife based on the theme from the March "General Miloradovich" (Марш "Генерал Милорадович") by Valeriy Khalilov
- Farewell of Slavyanka (Прощание Славянки) by Vasiliy Agapkin
- Ballad of a Soldier (Баллада о Солдате) by Vasiliy Pavlovich Solovyov-Sedoy
- Lefort's March (Лефортовский Марш) by Valeriy Khalilov
- March of the Artillerymen ("Марш артиллеристов") by Tikhon Khrennikov
- On Guard for Peace (На страже Мира) by Boris Diyev
- Air March ("Авиaмарш") by Yuliy Khayt
- We are the Army of the People (Мы Армия Народа) by Georgiy Mavsesya
- I Believe, My Friends ("Я верю, друзья") by Oskar Fel'tsman
- March Kant (Марш «Кант») by Valeriy Khalilov
- In Defense of the Homeland (В защиту Родины) by Viktor Runov
- Phalanx March (Строевой Марш) by Dmitriy Pertsev
- We Need One Victory ("Нам нужна одна Победа") by Bulat Okudzhava
- Glory to the Heroes (Слава героям) by Dmitriy Pertsev
- The Crew is One Family (Экипаж - одна семья) by Viktor Pleshak
- Let's Go ("В путь") by Vasiliy Solovyov-Sedoy
- March Victory Day (Марш "День Победы") by David Tukhmanov

Drill Show and Conclusion

- Vivat, Rossiya! (Виват, Россия!) by Boris Diyev
- March Hero (Марш "Герой")
- Vivat, Rossiya! (Виват, Россия!) by Boris Diyev
- Unknown drum piece
- Procession of the Nobles from Mlada by Nikolay Rimskiy-Korsakov
- Invincible and Legendary (Несокрушимая и легендарная) by Aleksandr Aleksandrov
