= Vapaa Venäjä =

"Vapaa Venäjä" (Free Russia) is a working class song style, known for its many Finnish text versions and recordings.

The track is originated from Vasily Agapkin compositions, Farewell of Slavianka. The author or authors of Finnish words are unknown, but the translation has been speculated after the civil war since the Finnish Reds move to USSR after its loss in the Finnish Civil War. Thanks to its contagious tone, the song became popular in Finland and popular in the 1920s.

The track is used as a marching song for the Finnish Reds.

In the 1920s, the song was particularly popular among American Finns. In the United States, there were as many as four different versions of the song. In the first versions recorded by Otto Pyykkönen, there was a different lyrics compared in the later album of Jukka Ahti.

In Copenhagen, with a clay disc recorded on the B side, Warnys Danse Orchestra plays "Vapaa Venäjä". The first recording made in Finland was the 1955 Rytmi-note made by Solistiseitika Otava. The first song made in Finland was the recordings of Reijo Frank from 1969.

== Lyrics ==
"Vapaa Venäjä"
Vapaa Venäjä instrumental version.

"Maailman raatajat, sorron kahleet pois!
Meitä keisarit ei enää hoivaa
eikä veriset julmuritkaan.
Tovereissamme meillä on voimaa
vapauttamme puolustamaan.
Me kahlehia kyllin oomme kantaneet,
ja kaikki toverimme on vankityrmiin sortuneet.
Meitä keisarit ei enää hoivaa
eikä veriset julmuritkaan.
Tovereissamme meillä on voimaa
vapauttamme puolustamaan.
Jo ääni vapauden
kultahelminä helähtelee.
Sen tenho valtaa
ja kahleet poistaa
tai kansat julmain tyrannein.
Toverit kuulkaa,
jo murtuu kahleet
pois tieltä onnen, vapauden!"

=== Literal translation ===
Ravagers of the world, cast off the chains of oppression!
We are no longer cared for by emperors, nor by bloody tyrants.
In our comrades we have the strength to defend our freedom.
We have worn chains enough, and all our comrades have fallen into dungeons.
We are no longer cared for by emperors, nor by bloody tyrants.
In our comrades we have the strength to defend our freedom.
Even the voice, like the golden pearl of freedom, vibrates.
Its charm conquers and removes chains or nations with cruel tyrants.
Comrades, listen, the shackles are already breaking out of the way of happiness, freedom!
