= Band of the 154th Preobrazhensky Regiment =

Regimental band unit

- Оркестр 154-го Преображенского полка
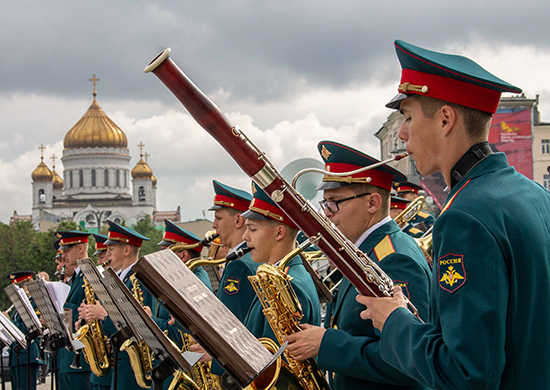
- The band in Alexander Garden in 2018.
- Active: June 1, 2011 – present
- Country: Soviet Union; Russia
- Branch: Ministry of Defense
- Type: Regimental Military Band
- Role: Ceremony services
- Part of: 154th Preobrazhensky Independent Commandant's Regiment
- Headquarters: Lefortovo Barracks, Lefortovo District, Moscow
- Nickname: HQ Band of the Moscow Garrison

Commanders
- Director of the Music: Major Oleg Tyshuk
- Band Conductor: Captain Marat Gayanov
- Notable commanders: Nikolai Ponomaryov

The Band of the 154th Preobrazhensky Regiment is a special military unit that is the official regimental band for the 154th Preobrazhensky Independent Commandant's Regiment. It is a branch of the Military Band Service of the Armed Forces of Russia. The band serves the entire Moscow Region, which earned it the nickname HQ Band of the Moscow Garrison. A notable member was Konstantin Petrovich, who later served in the band of the guard of honour and the band of the defence ministry, as well as Semyon Milsyteyn, a Russian-Soviet trumpeter and former soloist in the band.

== Brief history and activities ==
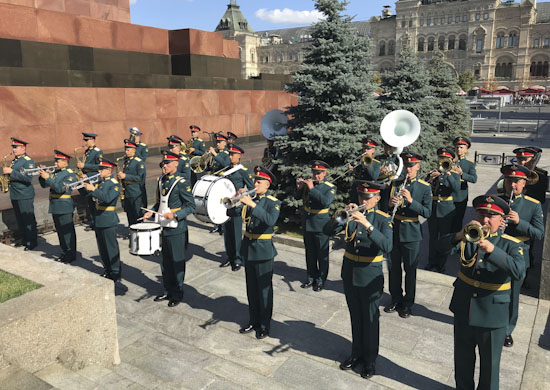
The band at Lenin's Mausoleum.

The Band of the 154 Preobrazhensky Regiment was established on June 1, 2011 on the basis of the 13th Military Band (of the HQ of Moscow Military District), which was formed back in 1940. In its early years, it participated in the Moscow Victory Parade of 1945 and the state visits of General Charles de Gaulle in 1944 and 1946. It also supported a meeting of the French veterans delegation from the Escadron de Chasse 2/30 Normandie-Niemen in Kubinka in 1971. It also participated in a demonstration of the guard of honor for the high command of the Soviet Air Force in 1972. The band supports key events and official ceremonies of the highest level with participation of the Mayor of Moscow and city government. The band is a part of the Massed Bands of the Moscow Garrison that participates in the military parades on Red Square. The band has notably participated in the 1941 October Revolution Parade, the 1980 Summer Olympic Games, the World Festival of Youth and Students, and the celebrations in honor of the 850th anniversary of Moscow. The band has recorded many pieces of music including the State Anthem of Russia.

== Commanders ==
In different years, the conductor conducted the military band:

- P.K. Slavsky (1947-1970)
- A.G. Kapustin (1970-1973)
- A.I. Serostanov (1973-1987)
- V.I. Babak (1987-1998)
- Lieutenant Colonel Alexander Kupriyanov (1998-?)
- Lieutenant Colonel Alexander Gerasimov (?-2005)
- Lieutenant Colonel Igor Shevernev (2005-2007)
- Yuri Kubyshkin (2008-2011)
- Major Serguei Kolesnikov
- Major Oleg Tyshuk (Present)

== Videos ==
- 13 оркестр штаба МВО плац-концерт 5 мая 1990 года / Internationale Taptoe Dordrecht 5 mei 1990 on YouTube
- "Военно-духовая музыка" Оркестр штаба МВО прoшёлся по улицам Москвы on YouTube
- Плац-концерт в Австрии on YouTube
- Юбилейный концерт Г.П. Алявдина /1998/ on YouTube
- Soviet March Victory Day Den Pobedi 1984 День Побевы on YouTube
