= Farewell of Slavianka =

Russian patriotic song

Прощание славянки
English: Farewell of Slavianka
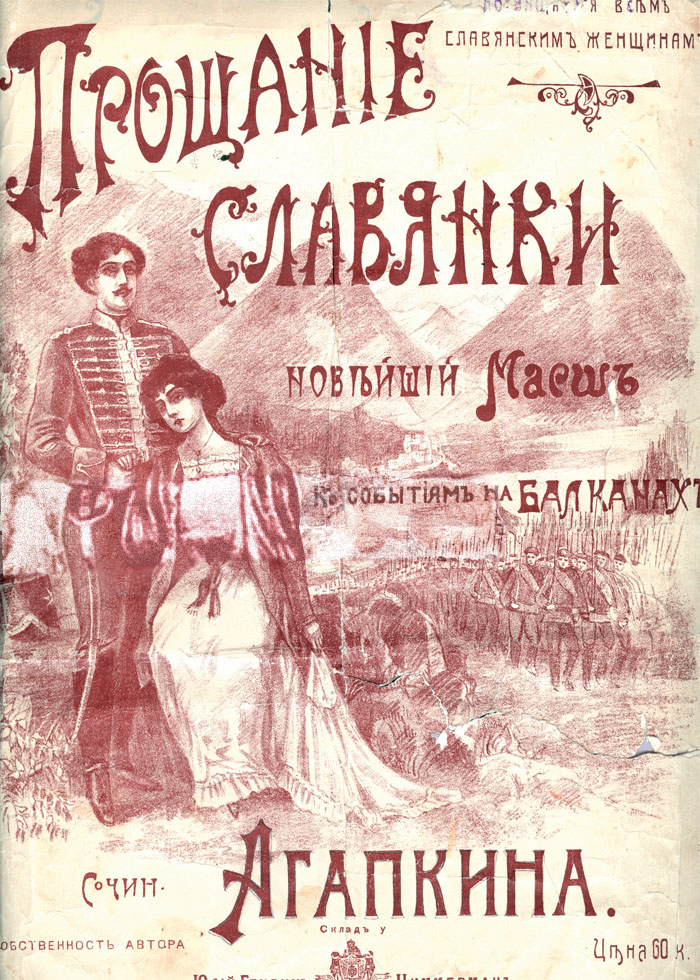
- The cover of one of the first editions of the "Farewell of Slavianka" notes
- Regional anthem of Tambov Oblast
- Also known as: Гимн Тамбовской области (English: Anthem of Tambov Oblast)
- Lyrics: Various, including versions by unknown authors and by Vasily Agapkin, 1912
- Music: Vasily Agapkin
- Adopted: 1937

"Farewell of Slavianka" (Note: Russian: Прощание славянки, romanized: Proshchaniye slavyanki, IPA: [prɐˈɕːænʲɪje sɫɐˈvʲankʲɪ]; pre-1918 Russian orthography: Прощаніе славянки) is a Russian patriotic march, written by the composer Vasily Agapkin in honour of Slavic women accompanying their husbands in the First Balkan War. The march was written and premiered in Tambov in late 1912. In the summer of 1915, it was released as a gramophone single in Kiev. Slavianka translates to 'Slavic woman'.

== History ==
Farewell of Slavianka
"Farewell of Slavianka" being performed by the United States Coast Guard Band in 2006.

The melody gained popularity in Russia and adjoining countries during World War I, when the Russian soldiers left their homes and were accompanied by the music of the march. It was also performed during the parade of 7 November 1941, on the Red Square, after which soldiers went straight to fight in the Battle of Moscow as part of World War II. This march was also used as an unofficial anthem of Admiral Kolchak's White Army.

Sources alleged that the song was banned prior to its use in the award-winning 1957 film The Cranes Are Flying, because of its lyrics about supposedly banned subjects. However, there are multiple documentations of the song being performed prior to this, many conducted by Agapkin himself. The earliest recorded publication of Farewell to Slavianka in the Soviet era was in 1929, and its earliest known performance by communist troops was in 1918. Most famously, it was one of four marching tunes performed during the 1941 October Revolution Parade on the Red Square. The song was originally published by Zimmerman Production Association around 1912. The march was published in an official collection of music for Red Army orchestras, and it was recorded in the early 1940s by a military orchestra under the conductor Ivan Petrov (1906–1975), but different lyrics were then used. Other lyrics are now usually sung by the Red Army Choir.

Subsequently, several composers have written lyrics for the music in various languages. During the Finnish Civil War the Red Guards adapted the song into "Vapaa Venäjä", a working class marching song. During World War II in German-occupied Poland, an adapted "underground" version of the song, Rozszumiały się wierzby płaczące (lit. 'Weeping Willows Began to Hum'), became popular in the Polish resistance and was based on lyrics by Roman Ślęzak.

In the 1990s, the liberal political party Yabloko lobbied unsuccessfully for the march to be adopted as the Russian national anthem.

"Farewell of Slavianka" was used in movies such as The Cranes Are Flying and Charlie Wilson's War, which is about the Soviet–Afghan War, and in the Russian movies 72 Meters and Prisoner of the Mountains. An instrumental version of the song was also featured in the 1974 Soviet film At Home Among Strangers, and the 1990 Ukrainian film Raspad during the Pripyat evacuation scene.

A Hebrew version was written in 1945 by the singer-songwriter Haim Hefer for the Palmach. In his version of the song, "Ben Gvulot" (בין גבולות; lit. 'Between Borders'), Hefer coined the phrase "Anu po chomat magen" (אָנוּ פֹּה חוֹמַת מָגֵן; lit. 'We are here a defensive wall'), which was used by the Israel Defense Forces to call Operation Defensive Shield (literally "Operation Defensive Wall") in 2002.

As the march was first published in 1912, the original musical composition has entered the public domain in the United States and many other jurisdictions. Under U.S. copyright law, all works published before 1 January 1931, are in the public domain regardless of the author's date of death.

== Lyrics ==
=== 1967 version ===
"Farewell of Slavianka" first received official lyrics under the Soviet leadership that were appropriate for the time's political climate, but references to Russian culture, religion and patriotism were changed. The new version by A. Fedotov.

The first version under the Soviet Union (1941) did not mention the Battle of Berlin, unlike the later version (1967).

Russian original

Этот марш не смолкал на перронах
когда враг заслонял горизонт.
С ним отцов наших в дымных вагонах
поезда увозили на фронт.

Он Москву отстоял в сорок первом,
в сорок пятом шагал на Берлин,
Он c солдатом прошёл до Победы
по дорогам нелёгких годин.

И если в поход
страна позовёт,
За край наш родной
мы все пойдём в священный бой!

Шумят в полях хлеба.
Шагает Отчизна моя
к высотам счастья,
сквозь все ненастья,
дорогой мира и труда.

Anglo-Russian Romanization

Étot marsh ne smolkál na perrónakh
kogdá vrag zaslonyál gorizónt.
S nim otcóv náshikh v dýmnykh vagónakh
poyezdá uvozíli na front.

On Moskvú otstoyál v sórok pérvom,
v sórok pyátom shagál na Berlín,
On s soldátom proshyól do pobédy
po dorógam nelyógkikh godín.

I yésli v pokhód
straná pozovyót,
Za kray nash rodnóy
My vse poydyóm v svyashchénnyy boy!

Shumyát v polyákh khléba.
Shagáyet otchízna moyá
k vysótam schástia,
skvoz vse nenástia,
dorogóy míra i trudá.

English translation

This march was not silent on the platforms,
When the foe clouded the horizon.
With it, our fathers, in smoking railcars,
Were brought to the front by trains.

In '41 he preserved Moscow,
In '45 he marched on Berlin.
He accompanied the soldiers to victory,
Along the roads of tough years.

And if the country,
Calls us to campaign.
For our native land,
We'll all march to sacred war!

Wheat rustles in the fields,
My fatherland marches!
Toward the heights of joy,
Through all misfortunes,
On the path of peace and labor!

=== 1984 version ===
Another version of the lyrics was written by Vladimir Lazarev in 1984 and has gained the popularity since the dissolution of the Soviet Union in 1991 because of the slower tempo and the added human fragility factor.

Russian original

Наступает минута прощания,
Ты глядишь мне тревожно в глаза,
И ловлю я родное дыхание,
А вдали уже дышит гроза.

Дрогнул воздух туманный и синий,
И тревога коснулась висков,
И зовёт нас на подвиг Россия,
Веет ветром от шага полков.

Прощай, отчий край,
Ты нас вспоминай,
Прощай, милый взгляд,
Прости-прощай, прости-прощай.

Прощай, отчий край,
Ты нас вспоминай,
Прощай, милый взгляд,
Не все из нас придут назад.

Летят, летят года,
Уходят во мглу поезда,
А в них — солдаты.
И в небе тёмном,
Горит солдатская звезда.

Anglo-Russian Romanization

Nastupáyet minúta proshchániya,
Ty glyadísh mne trevózhno v glazá,
I lóvlyu ya rodnóye dykhániye,
A vdalí uzhé dýshit grozá.

Drógnul vózdukh tumánnyy i síniy,
I trevóga kosnúlas viskóv,
I zovyót nas na pódvig Rossíya,
Véyet vétrom ot shága polkóv.

Proshcháy, ótchiy kray,
Ty nas vspomináy,
Proshcháy, mílyy vzglyad,
Prostí-proshcháy, prostí-proshcháy.

Proshcháy, ótchiy kray,
Ty nas vspomináy,
Proshcháy, mílyy vzglyad,
Ne vse iz nas pridút nazád.

Letyát, letyát góda,
Ukhódyat vo mglu póyezda,
A v nikh — soldáty.
I v nébe tyómnom,
Gorít soldátskaya zvezdá

English translation

The minute of parting's near,
You look into my eyes with angst.
I can feel your breath,
A storm's already forming from afar.

The heavy, misty air's trembling,
Anxiety's touched my temples.
Russia's calling us for heroic deeds,
One can feel the wind of marching regiments.

Farewell, homeland,
Remember us.
Farewell, familiar faces,
Forgiving farewell, forgiving farewell.

Farewell, homeland,
Remember us.
Farewell, familiar faces,
We're not all gonna come back.

Fly, fly through the years,
Trains disappear in the darkness.
In them are the soldiers,
And in the dark sky
The soldier's star shines.

=== 1993 version ===
This version of the lyrics was performed in 1993, around the time of the constitutional crisis in Russia.

Russian original

На причале славянка стояла
И махала прощально рукой,
По реке бы за ним побежала:
«Сокол мой, возвращайся домой!»

Припев:
Прощай, мой родной,
Иди на смертный бой,
Пусть знает подлый враг,
Как бьются за советский флаг!

Но время пролетит,
Победный наш марш прозвучит,
Живым вернёшся,
В огне спасёшся,
Тебя любовь моя хранит!
Живым вернёшся,
В огне спасёшся,
Тебя любовь моя хранит!

Пусть победа ценою безмерна,
Плач славянки звучит и звучит:
«За Советский Союз, за Победу
Мой единственный там постоит».

Припев

Слёзы я утираю украдкой,
Ох горька ты разлука, горька,
Ведь не зря родилась я славянкой,
Чашу горькую выпью до дна.

Припев

Начинают истаивать тучи,
Рать советская встала стеной,
Светоч мира, ты стяг наш могучий,
Ты зовёшь наш народ за собой.

Припев

Anglo-Russian Romanization

Na prichále slavyánka stoyála
I makhála proshchálno rukóy
Po reké by za nim pobezhála:
"Sókol moy, vozvrashcháysya domóy!"

Pripév:
Proshcháy, moy rodnóy,
Idí na smértnyy boy,
Pust znáyet pódlyy vrag,
Kak biútsya za sovétskiy flag!

No vrémya proletít,
Pobédnyy nash marsh prozvuchít,
Zhivým vernyóshsya,
V ogné spasyóshsya,
Tebyá lyubóv moyá khranít!
Zhivým vernyóshsya,
V ogné spasyóshsya,
Tebyá lyubóv moyá khranít!

Pust pobéda cenóyu bezmérna,
Plach slavyánki zvuchít i zvuchít:
"Za Sovétskiy Soyúz, za Pobédu
Moy yedínstvennyy tam postoít".

Pripév

Slyózy ya utiráyu ukrádkoy,
Okh gorká ty razlúka, gorká,
Ved ne zrya rodilás ya slavyánkoy,
Cháshu górkuyu výpiu do dna.

Pripév

Nachináyut istáivat túchi,
Rat sovétskaya vstála stenóy,
Svétoch míra, ty styag nash mogúchiy,
Ty zovyósh nash naród za sobóy.

Pripév

English translation

A Slavic woman stood on the pier
And she waved her hand goodbye,
I would run after him along the river:
"My falcon, come home!"

Chorus:
Goodbye, my dear,
Go to mortal combat
Let the vile enemy know
How they fight for the Soviet flag!

But time will fly by
Our victorious march will sound,
You'll come back alive
You will be saved in the fire,
My love protects you!
You'll come back alive
You will be saved in the fire,
My love protects you!

Let the victory at a price be immeasurable,
The cry of the Slavic woman sounds and sounds:
"For the Soviet Union, for Victory
My only one will stand there."

Chorus

I wipe away my tears furtively,
Oh, bitter is your separation, bitter,
It's not in vain that I was born a Slav,
I will drink the bitter cup to the dregs.

Chorus

The clouds begin to melt,
The Soviet army stood like a wall,
Light of the world, you are our mighty banner,
You call our people to follow you.

Chorus

=== 1997 version ===
A White Army version of the march, written by Andrei Mingalyov, was created after the dissolution of the Soviet Union.

Russian original

Встань за Веру, Русская Земля!
Много песен мы в сердце сложили,
Воспевая родные края
Беззаветно тебя мы любили,
Святорусская наша земля.
Высоко ты главу поднимала –
Словно солнце твой лик воссиял.
Но ты жертвою подлости стала –
Тех, кто предал тебя и продал!

Припев:
И снова в поход труба нас зовёт.
Мы все встанем в строй
И все пойдём в священный бой.

Встань за Веру, Русская земля!
Ждут победы России святые.
Отзовись, православная рать!
Где Илья твой и где твой Добрыня?
Сыновей кличет Родина-мать.
Под хоругви мы встанем все смело
Крёстным ходом с молитвой пойдём,
За Российское правое дело
Кровь мы русскую честно прольём.

Припев

Встань за Веру, Русская Земля!
Все мы – дети великой Державы,
Все мы помним заветы отцов
Ради Родины, Чести и Славы
Не жалей ни себя, ни врагов.
Встань, Россия, из рабского плена,
Дух победы зовёт: в бой, пора!
Подними боевые знамёна
Ради Веры, Любви и Добра!

Припев

Anglo-Russian Romanization

Vstan za Véru, Rússkaya Zemlyá!
Mnógo pésen my v sérdce slozhíli,
Vospeváya rodnýe krayá
Bezzavétno tebyá my lyubíli,
Svyatorússkaya násha zemlyá.
Vysokó ty glavú podnimála –
Slóvno sólnce tvoy lik vossiyál.
No ty zhértvoyu pódlosti stála –
Tekh, kto prédal tebyá i prodál!

Pripév:
I snóva v pokhód trubá nas zovyót.
My vse vstánem v stroy
I vse poydyóm v svyashchénnyy boy.

Vstan za Véru, Rússkaya Zemlyá!
Zhdut pobédy Rossíi svyatýye.
Otzovís, pravoslávnaya rat!
Gde Iliá tvoy i gde tvoy Dobrýnya?
Synovéy klíchet Ródina-mat.
Pod khorúgvi my vstánem vse smélo
Kryóstnym khódom s molítvoy poydyóm,
Za Rossíyskoye právoye délo
Krov my rússkuyu chéstno prolióm.

Pripév

Vstan za Véru, Rússkaya Zemlyá!
Vse my – déti velíkoy derzhávy,
Vse my pómnim zavéty otcóv
Rádi Ródiny, Chésti i Slávy
Ne zhaléy ni sebyá, ni vragóv.
Vstan, Rossíya, iz rábskogo pléna,
Dukh pobédy zovyót: v boy, porá!
Podnimí boyevýe znamyóna
Rádi Véry, Lyubví i Dobrá!

Pripév

English translation

Arise for faith, o Russian land!
We composed many a song in our heart,
Glorifying the native land.
We loved thee no matter what,
Thou, our holy Russian land.
Thou hast raised high thy head,
Thy face shone like the sun.
But thou hast become a victim of betrayal –
by those who have thee cheated and sold!

Chorus:
And again in march trumpet calleth us.
We all stand in order
And go to the holy battle.

Arise for faith, o Russian land!
The saints await Russia's victory.
Respond, o Orthodox host!
Where is thine Ilya, where is thy Dobrynya?
Mother Homeland summoneth her sons.
We'll stand together under the gonfalons.
And go, praying, as a procession,
For the right cause of Russia
We'll shed honestly Russian blood.

Chorus

Arise for faith, o Russian land!
We're all children of a great empire,
We all remember the commandments of our fathers:
For the Homeland, Honour, Glory,
Pity neither thyself nor thine enemy.
Arise, Russia, from thy prison of slavery,
Victory's spirit is called: time for battle!
Rise thy battle flags
For Faith, Love, and the Good.

Chorus

=== 2026 version ===
In the fifth year of the Special Military Operation on the territory of Ukraine, amid growing war-weariness, a perceived need emerged within Russian society for a patriotic song of a hymn-like character that would foster a positive attitude towards victory. Andrey Kandaurov, author of an alternative Russian anthem, subsequently wrote a new set of lyrics for the melody of the march.

Russian original

Будь ты правдой Родина сильна!

Век за веком победы ковала,
Побеждая врагов и тогда…
Быть источником силы ты стала,
Всем народам своим навсегда.

Сыновей, дочерей воспитала,
Как героев блестящих побед.
Павших воинов своих поминала,
Слава их не померкнет вовек.

Взмывай, русский флаг,
Народ собирай.
Веди за собой,
Вперёд к победам, мы с тобой.

Россия моя,
Победы твои на века.
Источник правды, могучей силы,
Твоя великая судьба.

Год за годом сильнее ты стала,
Силу в правде найти мы смогли.
И её приумножить нам надо,
Чтобы к новым свершениям идти.

Мы историю нашу прославим,
Для потомков её сохраним.
Пусть грядущее вскоре настанет,
Верой нашей, Победой Руси.

Взмывай, русский флаг,
Народ собирай.
Веди за собой,
Вперёд к победам, мы с тобой.

Россия моя,
Верны мы тебе на века.
Как впредь едины, твои народы,
Для нас ты общая земля.

Anglo-Russian Romanization

Bud ty právdoy Ródina silná!

Vek za vékom pobédy kovála,
Pobezhdáya vragóv i togdá…
Byt istóchnikom síly ty stála,
Vsem naródam svoím navsegdá.

Synovéy, docheréy vospitála,
Kak geróyev blestyáshchikh pobéd.
Pávshikh vóinov svoíkh pominála,
Sláva ikh ne pomérknet vovék.

Vzmyváy, rússkiy flág,
Naród sobiráy.
Vedí za sobóy,
Vperyód k pobédam, my s tobóy.

Rossíya moyá,
Pobédy tvoí na veká.
Istóchnik právdy, mogúchey síly,
Tvoyá velíkaya sudbá.

God za gódom silnéye ty stála,
Sílu v právde naytí my smoglí.
I yeyó priumnózhit nam nádo,
Chóby k nóvym svershéniyam idtí.

My istóriyu náshu proslávim,
Dlya potómkov yeyó sokhraním.
Pust gryadúshcheye vskóre nastánet,
Véroy náshey, Pobédoy Rusí.

Vzmyváy, rússkiy flág,
Naród sobiráy.
Vedí za sobóy,
Vperyód k pobédam, my s tobóy.

Rossíya moyá,
Vérny my tebé na veká.
Kak vpred yediný, tvoí naródy,
Dlya nas ty óbshchaya zemlyá.

English translation

By the Truth our Motherland is strong!

Forging victories through all the ages,
Crushing every foe, even then…
Source of power on history's pages,
For all peoples you're stay once again.

Sons and daughters you've raised for the glory,
Heroes born to prevail and to lead.
Fallen warriors live in your story,
And their fame will forever proceed.

Soar high, Russian flag,
Gather all the folk.
Lead us on your way,
Forward to victory, we’re with you.

Russia of mine,
Victories are yours for all time.
Source of the truth and the mighty power,
Such is your destiny so grand.

Year by year you have only grown stronger,
In the truth we have found all our might.
We must strengthen and hold it much longer,
To achieve every goal in our sight.

We will honor our history's treasures,
For descendants we’ll keep it alive.
Let the future arrive with new measures,
By our faith and Rus' Victory's drive.

Soar high, Russian flag,
Gather all the folk.
Lead us on your way,
Forward to victory, we’re with you.

Russia of mine,
Faithful we remain for all time.
Nations are one as they were before now,
You are our common holy land.

=== Anthem of Tambov Oblast ===
The melody of "Farewell of Slavianka" was used for the regional anthem of Tambov Oblast, whose lyrics were written on 22 May 2002 by A. Mitrofanov.

Russian original

На просторах бескрайних и синих,
Где берёзы любуются Цной,
В самом сердце великой России
Ты раскинулся, край наш родной.
Полыхали зловеще зарницы,
Но в историю грозных веков
Ты вписал своей славы страницы,
Честь, свободу храня от оков.

Припев:
Тамбовский наш край,
В веках процветай!
Ты славен людьми,
Храни, Господь, тебя, храни!

И пусть летят года,
Ты с нами, наш край, навсегда.
Здесь родились мы,
И с этим краем
У нас на всех одна судьба.
Здесь родились мы,
И с этим краем
У нас на всех одна судьба.

Припев

С пульсом Родины шаг свой сверяя,
Край любимый наш смотрит вперёд,
Славу верных сынов умножая,
Твёрдой поступью к счастью идёт.
Пусть заметнее будут успехи,
Хорошеет любимый наш край,
На земле благодатной во веки
Цветом яблонь своих расцветай.

Припев

Anglo-Russian Romanization

Na prostórakh beskráynikh i sínikh,
Gde beryózy lyubúyutsya Cnoy,
V sámom sérdce velíkoy Rossíi
Ty raskínulsya, kray nash rodnóy.
Polykháli zlovéshche zarnícy,
No v istóriyu gróznykh vekóv
Ty vpisál svoyéy slávy stranícy,
Chest, svobódu khranyá ot okóv.

Pripév:
Tambóvskiy nash kray,
V vekákh procvetáy!
Ty sláven lyudmí,
Khraní, Gospód, tebyá, khraní!

I pust letyát góda,
Ty s námi, nash kray, navsegdá.
Zdes rodilís my,
I s étim kráyem
U nas na vsekh odná sudbá.
Zdes rodilís my,
I s étim kráyem
U nas na vsekh odná sudbá.

Pripév

S púlsom Ródiny shag svoy sveryáya,
Kray lyubímyy nash smótrit vperyód,
Slávu vérnykh synóv umnozháya,
Tvyórdoy póstupiu k schástiu idyót.
Pust zamétneye búdut uspékhi,
Khoroshéyet lyubímyy nash kray,
Na zemlé blagodátnoy vo véki
Cvétom yáblon svoíkh rascvetáy.

Pripév

English translation

In endless blue expanses,
Where birches are admired by Tsna,
In the heart of great Russia
You are spread, our home region.
Heat-lightnings blaze ominously,
But in your history of horrid centuries
You've written the pages of your glory,
Keeping honour and freedom from shackles.

Chorus:
Our Tambov Region,
Prosper for centuries!
You're the glory by your folk,
May God bless and save you!

Let the years fly,
You are with us, our region, forever.
We were born there,
And with this region
We have one destiny.
We were born there,
And with this region
We have one destiny.

Chorus

Checking your step with the Motherland's pulse,
Our lovely region is looking forward,
Multiply the glory of your faithful sons,
Stepping firmly towards happiness.
Let success be more noticeable,
Our beloved region increases in beauty,
On a graceful land forever
Blossom with the colour of your apple trees.

Chorus

=== My Comrade in Death Throes ===
The melody of the song is also used for the poem My Comrade in Death Throes. It was written in December 1944 by Ion Degen, a Second World War tank ace.

Ты не плачь, не стони, ты не маленький,
Ты не ранен, ты просто убит.
Дай на память сниму с тебя валенки,
Нам еще наступать предстоит.

Ty ne plach', ne stoni, ty ne malen'kiy,
Ty ne ranen, ty prosto ubit.
Day na pamyat' snimu s tebya valenki,
Nam yeshche nastupat' predstoit.

Cry not, moan not, you're not little.
You're not wounded, you're simply killed.
Let me take off your valenki for memory,
We've yet to delve into attack.

== Charts ==
=== Military Band Service of the Armed Forces of Russia version ===
2025 weekly chart performance for "Proshchaniye slavyanki"
Chart (2025)	Peak position
Russia Streaming (TopHit)	88

2026 weekly chart performance for "Proshchaniye slavyanki"
Chart (2026)	Peak position
Russia Streaming (TopHit)	65
