= Special Exemplary Military Band of the Guard of Honor Battalion of Russia =

Special Exemplary Military Band of the Guard of Honor of Russia
- Военный образцовый оркестр Почётного караула России
- Emblem
- Active: November 29, 1956 – present
- Country: Soviet Union; Russia
- Branch: Ministry of Defense
- Type: Military Band
- Role: Ceremonial services
- Part of: 154th Preobrazhensky Independent Commandant's Regiment
- Garrison/HQ: Lefortovo Barracks, Lefortovo District, Moscow

Commanders
- Current commander: Lieutenant Colonel Vladimir Petrov

The Special Military Exemplary Band of the Honor Guard (Russian: Военный образцовый оркестр Почётного караула, ВООПК) is a special military unit that performs military music for the guard of honor of the Russian Armed Forces that greets foreign government delegations, as well as provide musical accompaniment for national events. It is a branch of the Military Band Service of the Armed Forces of Russia. The band was created in the fall of 1956 by order of the Soviet Government, having performed in the welcoming ceremonies of hundreds heads of state and has played its music at many memorials in the country.

The band forms part of the 3rd Honor Guard Battalion, 154th Preobrazhensky Independent Commandant's Regiment.

== Directors of the band ==
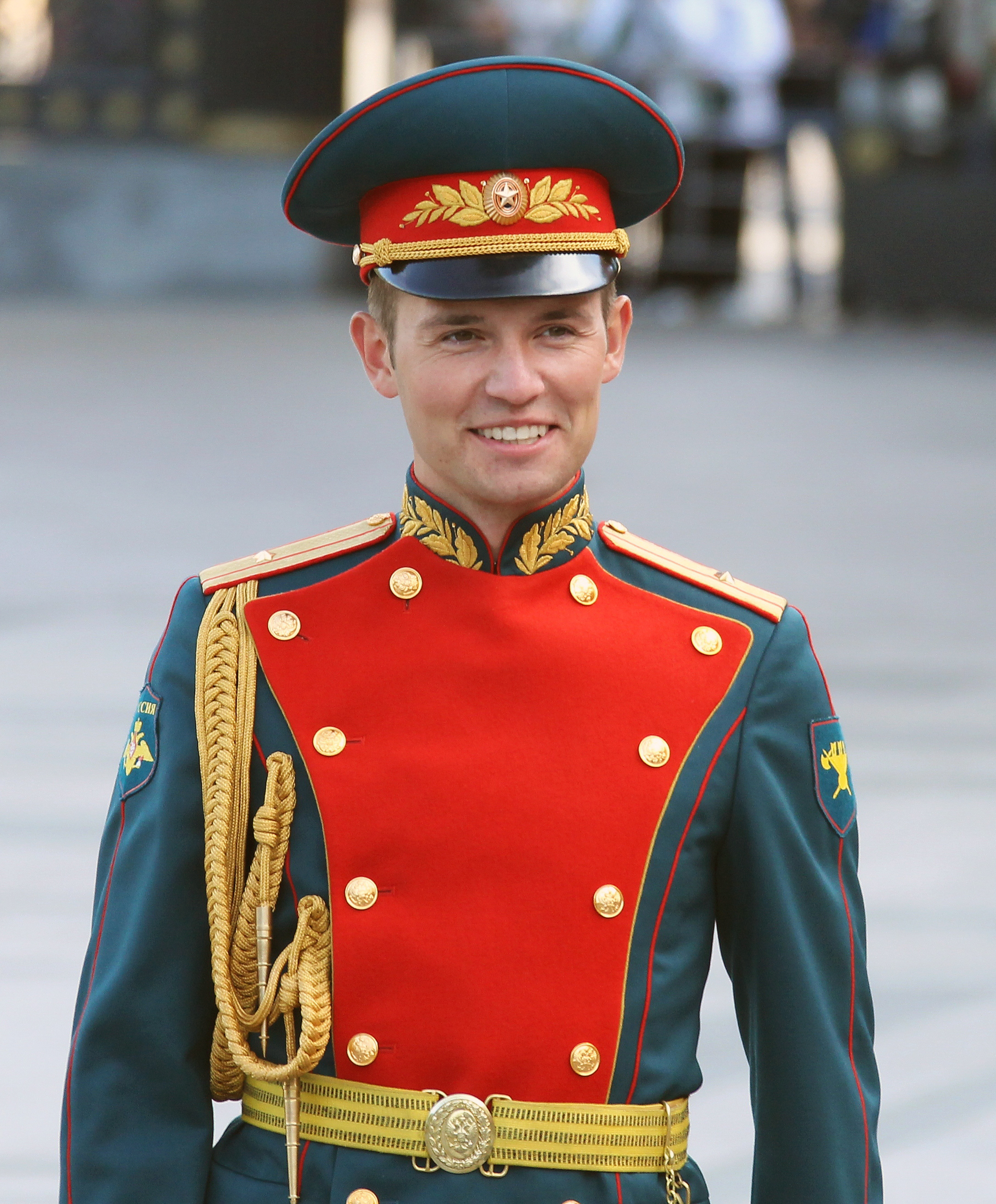
The commander of the band from 2009 to 2015, Konstantin Petrovich.

- Colonel Georgiy Nikolaev (1956–1968)
- Lieutenant Colonel Nikolai Zubarevich (1968–1972)
- Colonel Boris Dyldin (1972–1988)
- Colonel Anatoliy Prihodchenko (1989–1993)
- Colonel Sergey Gorev (1993–1998)
- Colonel Eduard Nikolaev (1998–2003)
- Colonel Mikhail Titov (2003–2007)
- Lieutenant Colonel Igor Pahomov (2008–2009)
- Major Konstantin Petrovich (2009–2015)
- Major Pavel Gernets (2015–2021)
- Lieutenant Colonel Vladimir Petrov (2021–present)

== Brief history ==
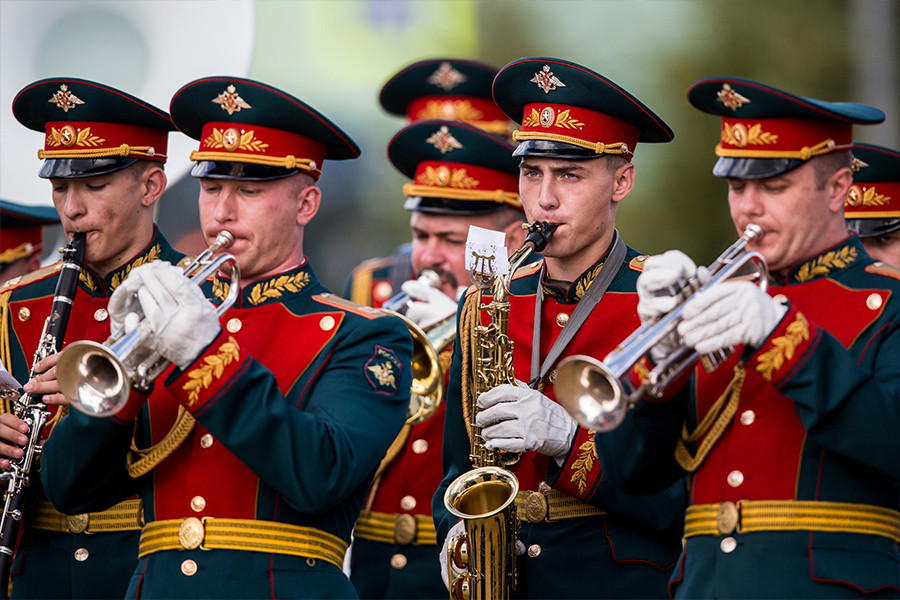
The band at Patriot Park in Kubinka, September 2016.

In one of the detachments of the Moscow Cheka, a special musical platoon was created to provide cultural activities for troops. The band was officially organized in the spring of 1940 at the Moscow Garrison. Three years later, the group was given the title of Exemplary Band of the 236th Regiment of the 36th NKVD Division. Since July 1951, the band has worked with ceremonial services in the Soviet Army, including the Dzerzhinsky 1st Motorized Rifle Division of the Ministry of Internal Affairs. On November 29, 1956, the Council of Ministers of the USSR ordered the band begin its existence as the Exemplary Military Band of the Guard of Honor. Since 1999, the band has been known and operated under its current name. It is best known for playing at the welcoming ceremony of Yuri Gagarin, the 1980 Summer Olympics, the Yalta and Potsdam Conferences and the visit of Kim Il Sung to Vladivostok. It serves as a musical unit during the wreath laying ceremony at the Tomb of the Unknown Soldier in Moscow's Alexander Garden.

=== Gallery ===
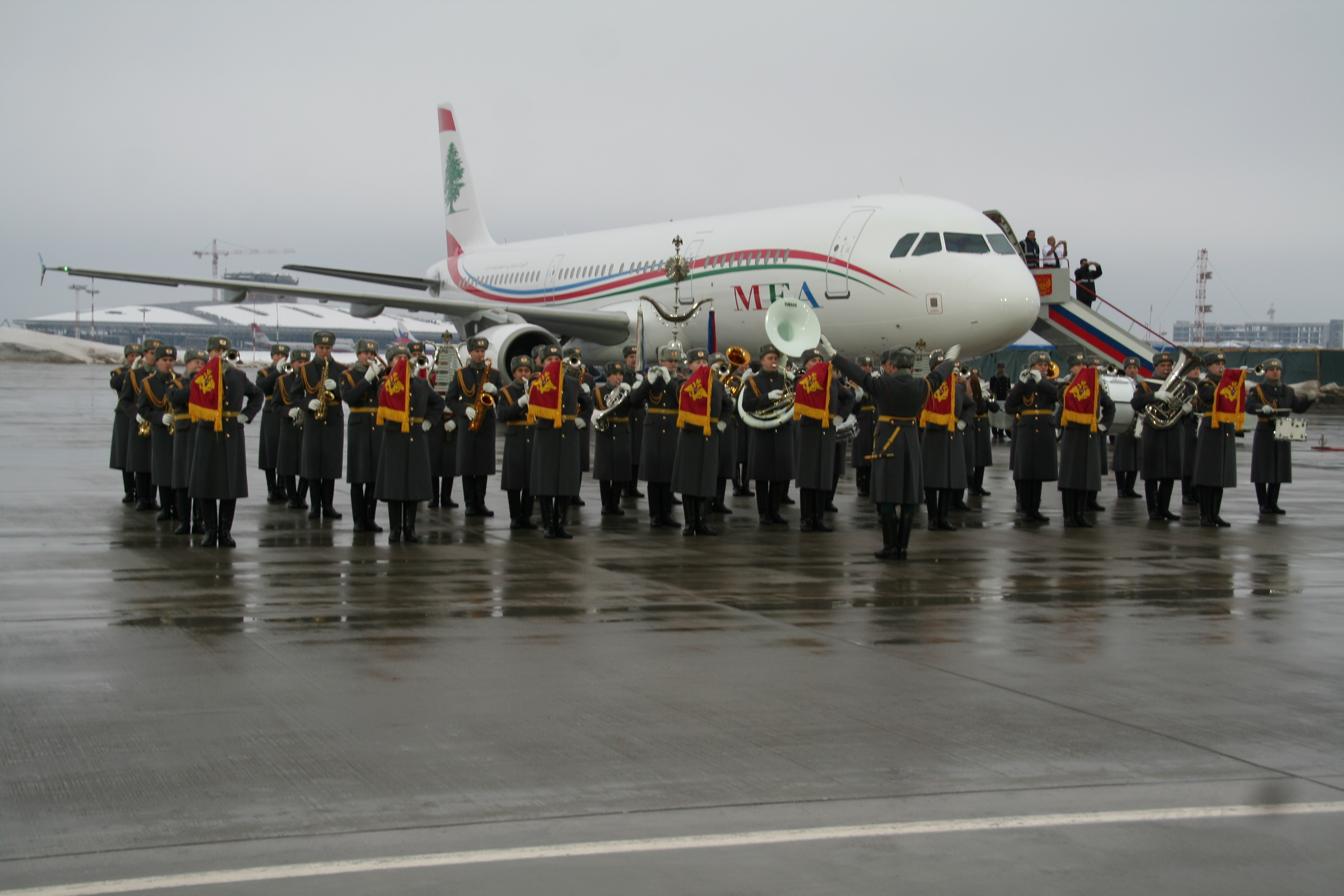
The band at Vnukovo International Airport.

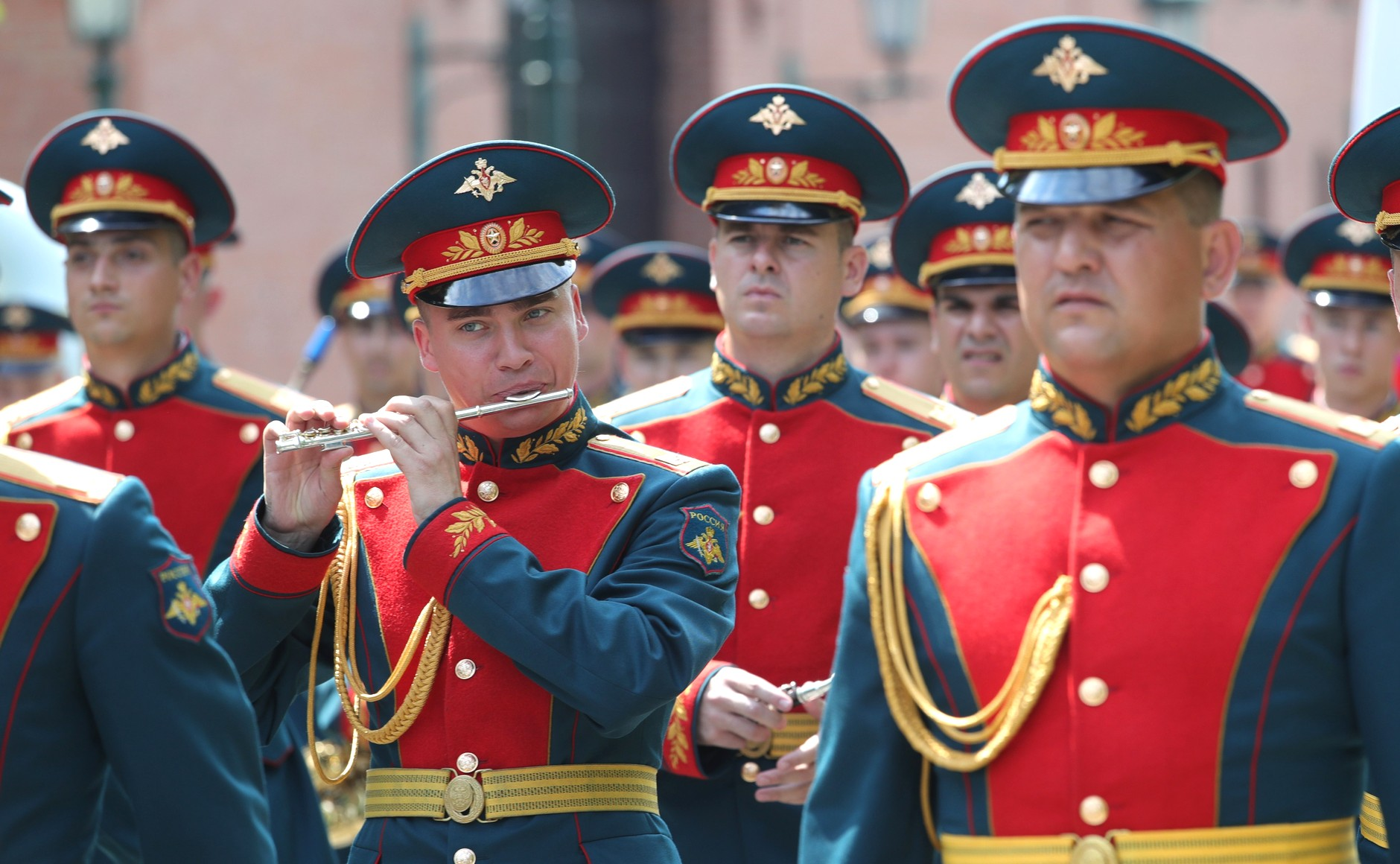
A flutist of the band in the summer uniform.

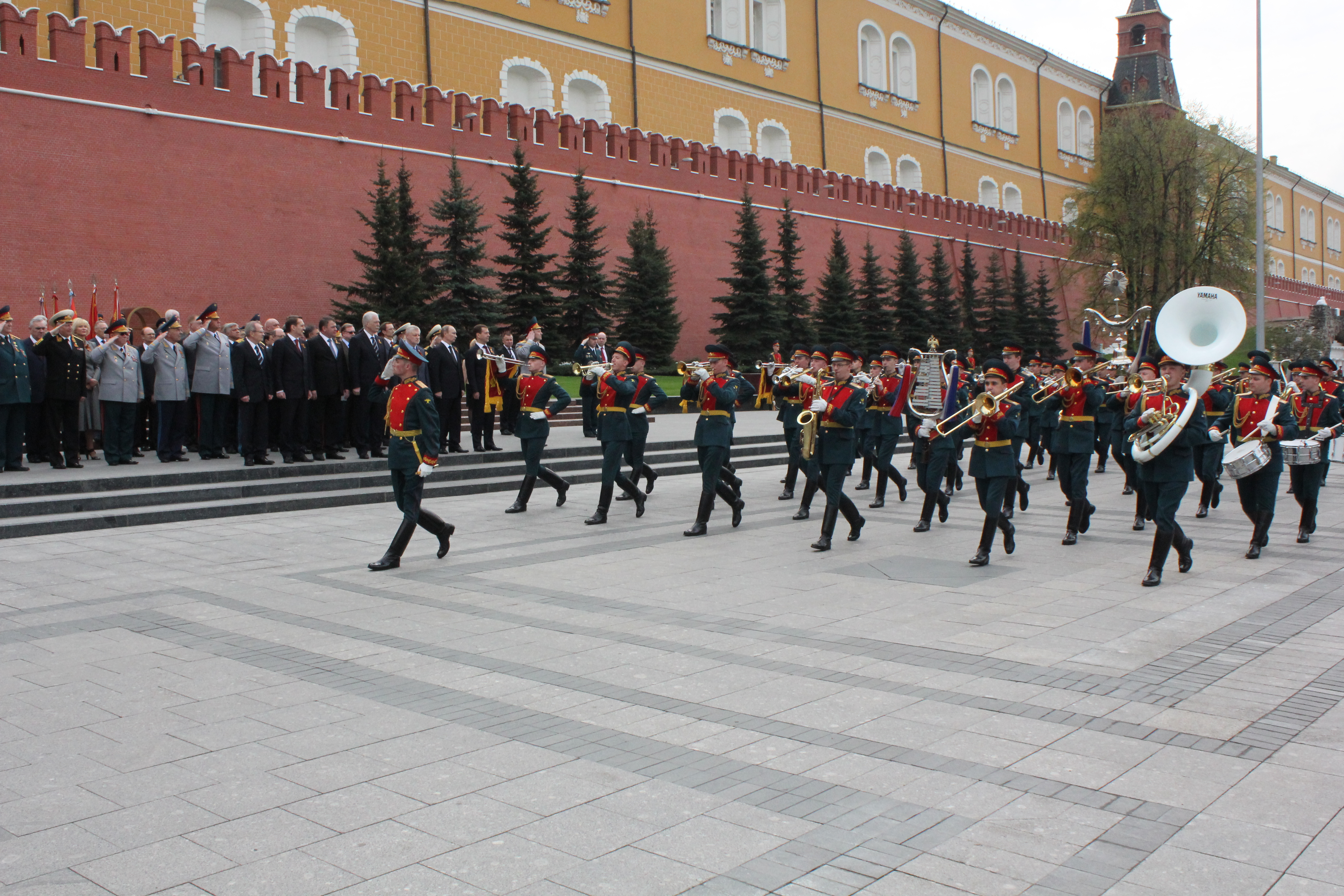
The band marching at the Tomb of the Unknown Soldier (Moscow) in Alexander Garden.

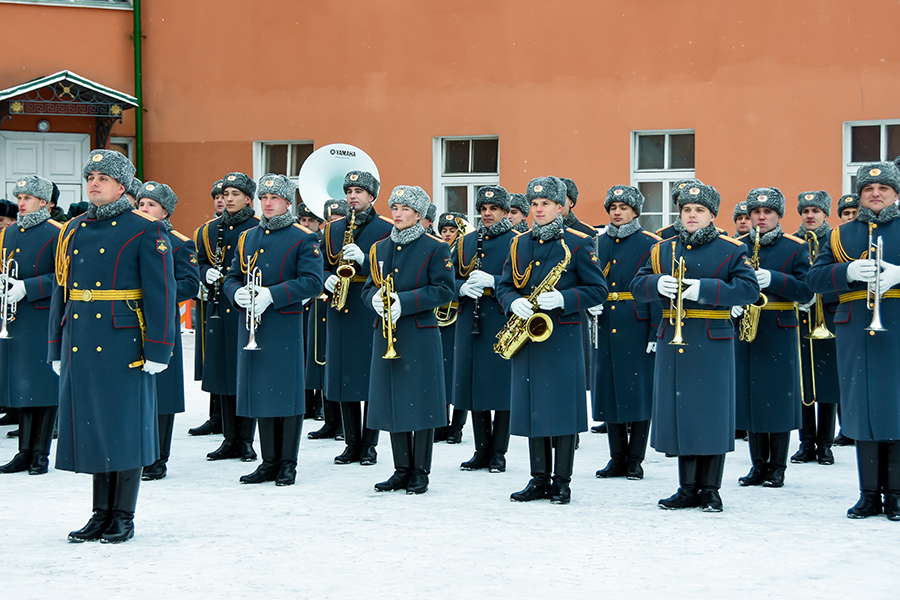
The band in their winter overcoats.

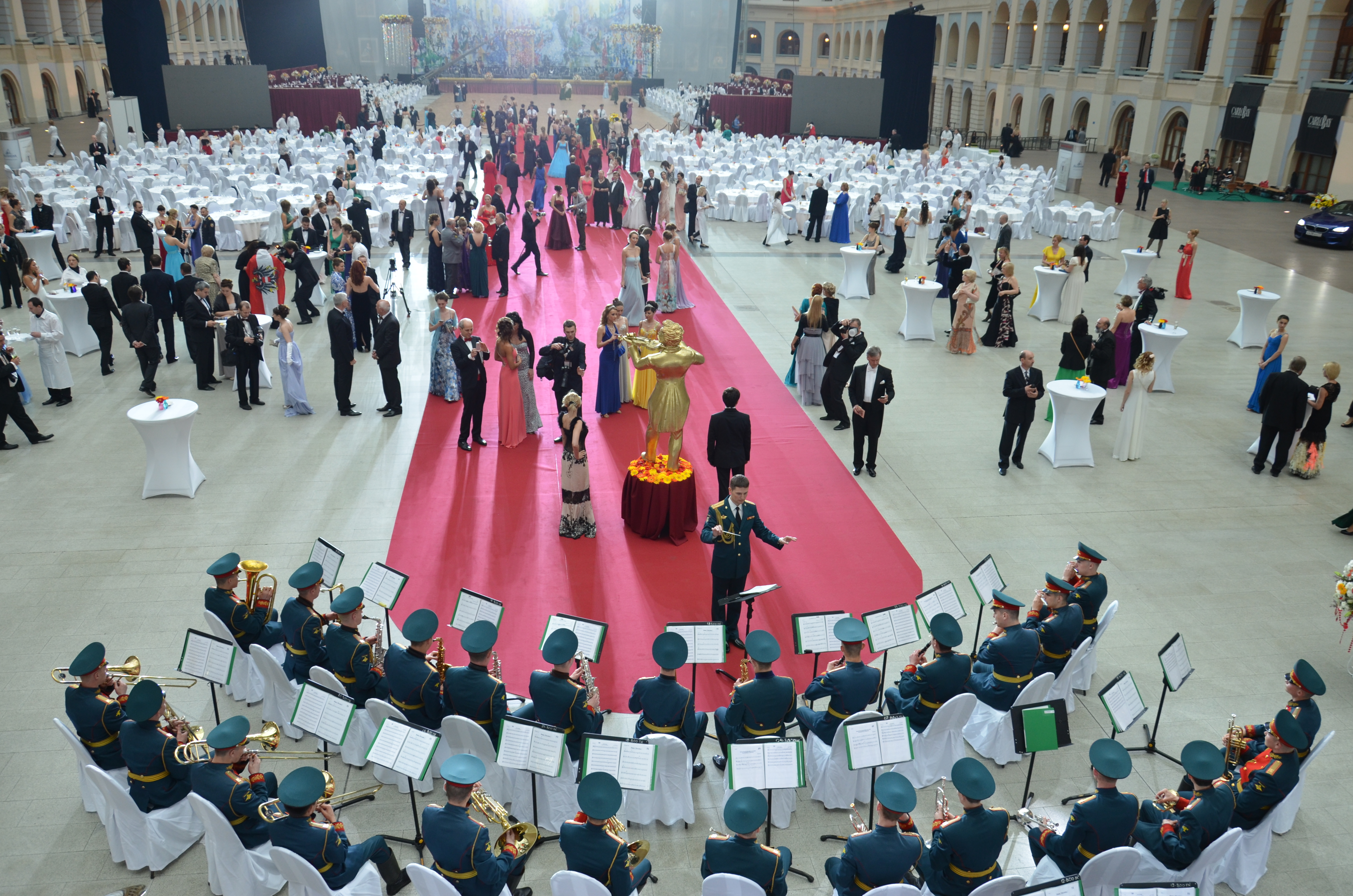
The band during a 2013 concert.

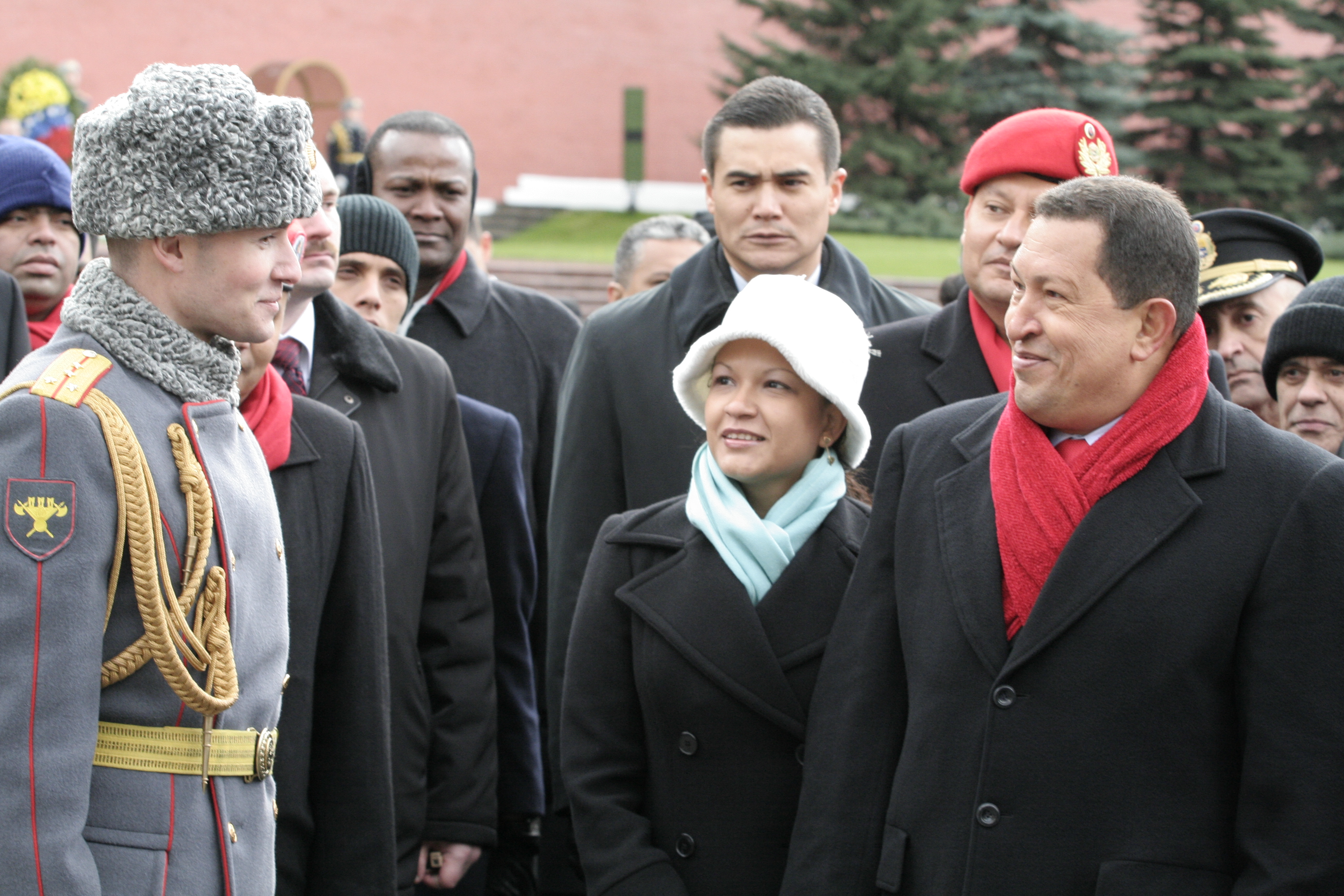
The head of the band with Venezuelan President Hugo Chavez.

== Common ceremonial Music ==
Title	Composer
Moscow Fanfare	A. Golovin
In Defense of the Motherland	Viktor Runov
Ballad of a Soldier	Vasily Solovyov-Sedoi
Jubilee Slow March "25 Years of the Red Army"	Semyon Chernetsky
Adagio	Valery Khalilov
Solemn Triumphal March	Valery Khalilov
Moscow's Salute	Semyon Chernetsky
March of the Preobrazhensky Regiment	
Slow March of the Red Army	Semyon Chernetsky
Slow March "Victory"	Yuri Griboedov
Song of the Soviet Army	Alexander Alexandrov

== Links ==
- Военный образцовый оркестр почётного караула.
