= Band of the Dzerzhinsky Division =

Military band unit of the Russian Armed Forces

The Band of the Separate Operational Purpose Division (Russian: Военно оркестр Отдельной дивизии оперативного назначения) also known by its original name, the Band of the Dzerzhinsky Division, is a military band of the National Guard Forces Command of the Rosgvardia. It is part of the Military Band Service of the National Guard of Russia. It is based out Reutov in the Moscow Oblast. The current director of the band is Lieutenant Colonel Alexander Kolesnikov.

== Overview ==
The first military band of the division was formed in February 1926. Musicians from Russian law enforcement forces had been participating in all military parades on Red Square since 1921. During the Great Patriotic War, a jazz band was created among the musicians of divisional bands, which, as part of a brigade, performed at the fronts in front of the soldiers of the Red Army. The band was notably led by Vasily Agapkin during this period and performed during the 1941 October Revolution Parade. The Band of the ODON in the Ministry of Internal Affairs of the Soviet Union was established on 6 December 1956. In 1971, it was turned into a direct unit of the Soviet Internal Troops and was renamed the Exemplary Band of Internal Troops of the USSR. Today, it is known as the Exemplary Band of the National Guard.

Since its establishment, it has provided musical accompaniment for important socio-political and cultural events such as wreath-laying ceremonies, visits of foreign delegations, military parades (particularly the Moscow Victory Day Parade where it has performed since 1982) and military tattoos. It has performed throughout venues such as Red Square, Izmailovsky Park, and Park Fili. It has performed famous compositions by Michael Jackson, Bi-2, and Bon Jovi in the original arrangement.

== See also ==
- Band of the National Guard of the Republic of Kazakhstan
- Military Band of the National Guard of Georgia
