= 1941 October Revolution Parade =

Military parade during the Battle of Moscow

Footage of the parade.

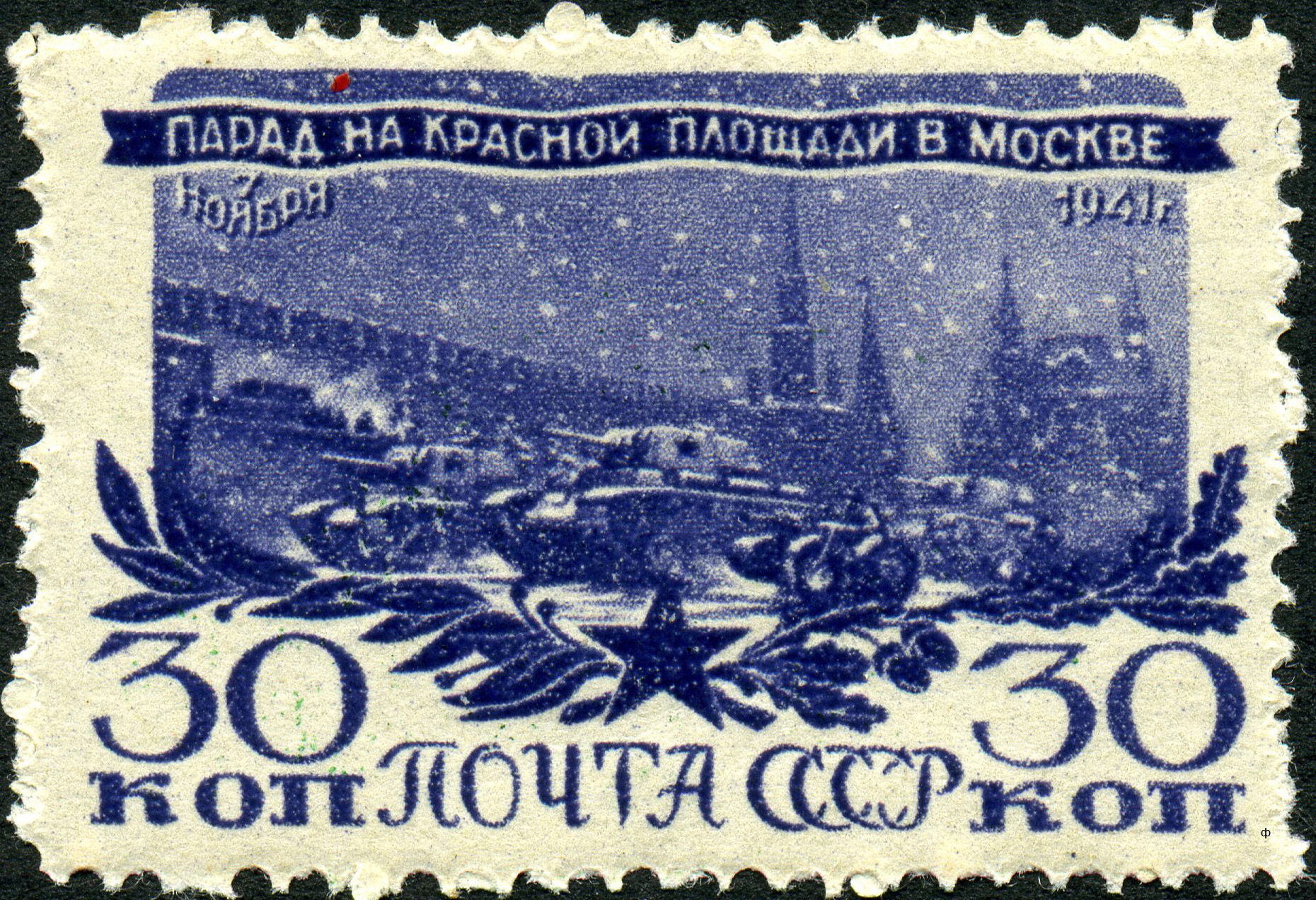
A stamp in honor of the parade.

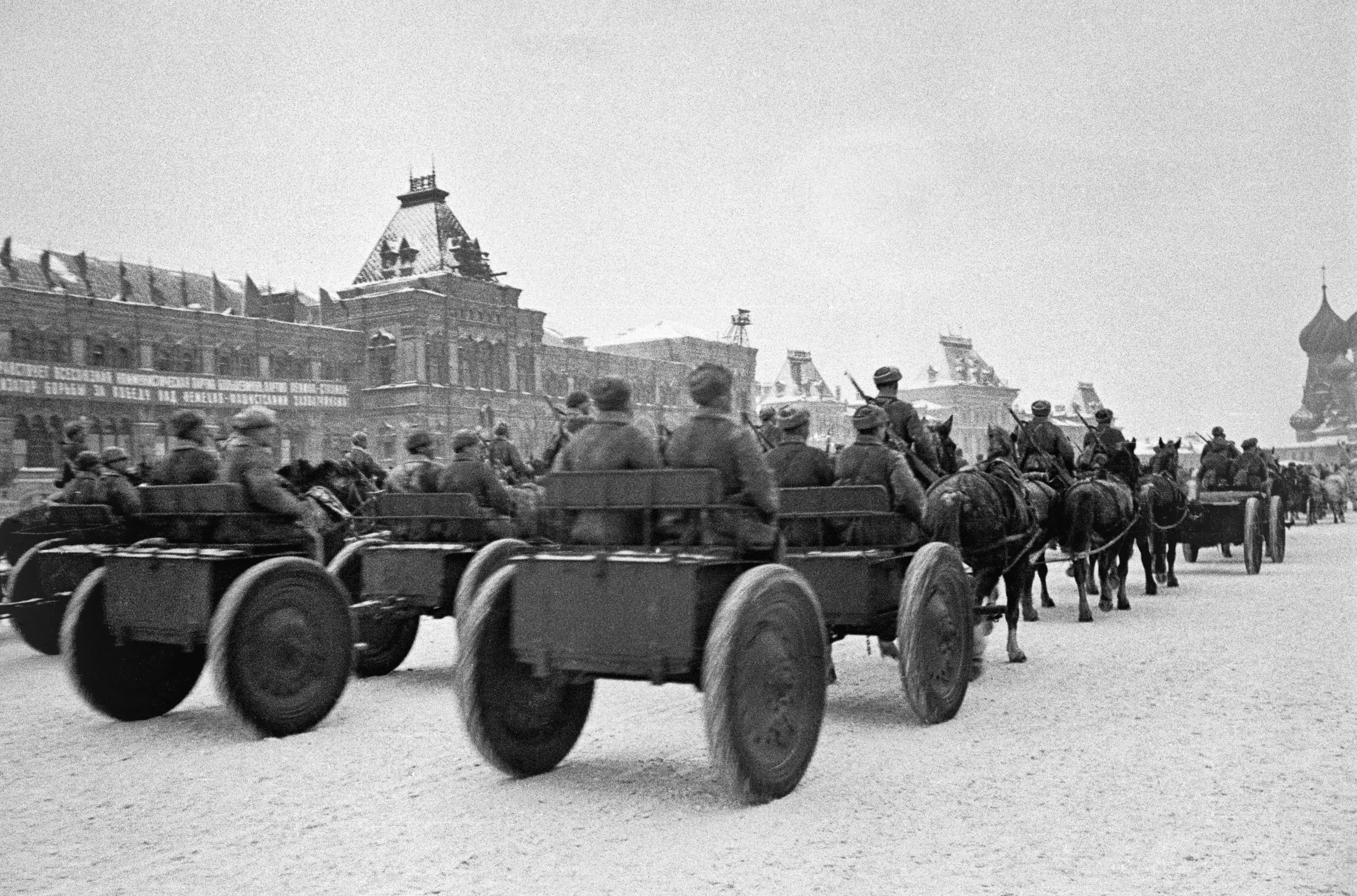
Vehicles on parade.

The 1941 October Revolution Parade of November 7, 1941 was a parade in honor of the October Revolution 24 years earlier. (Note: Russia and later the Soviet Union adopted the Gregorian calendar after the October Revolution, so that the anniversary now fell on 7 November.) It is most famous for taking place during the Battle of Moscow. The Communist Party General Secretary, Joseph Stalin, delivered a speech to the soldiers on the parade on Red Square, who would go to battle immediately after the parade. Many of the soldiers on the parade would be killed in battle. Every year in modern Russia, November 7th is a holiday in honor of the 1941 parade as a substitute for celebration of the October Revolution, as a Day of Military Honour.

Parades held on that year that are more memorable are the parades in Moscow's Red Square and in Kuybyshev Square, Samara (formerly Kuybyshev in the Soviet period). Both are marked today by commemorative parades to honor their historical importance.

== Order of the Moscow parade march past ==
The parade was inspected by the commander of the Reserve Front, Marshal of the Soviet Union Semyon Budyonny, with musical accompaniment by a combined band made up of the Central Military Band of the People's Commissariat of Defence, the Band of the Dzerzhinsky Division, and the Staff Band of the Moscow Military District, both under the baton of Colonel Vasily Agapkin, then the Director of Music, Staff Band of the Moscow Military District.

=== Ground column ===
Following Colonel General Pavel Artemyev riding on horseback, the parade marched past in the following order:

- Corps of Drums of the Moscow Military Music College
- Moscow Artillery School
- Combined Regiment from the 336th Naval Infantry Brigade and Navy Headquarters Detachment Moscow (1st Naval Task Group)
- 332nd Rifle Division
- ODON
- NKVD Internal Troops stationed in Moscow
- 2nd Moscow Rifle Division
- Regiment from the Military Council of the Moscow Military District
- Vsevobuch Regiment (two battalions)
- Veteran Red Guards battalion

== Stalin's speech ==
Video of Stalin's speech to the Red Army.

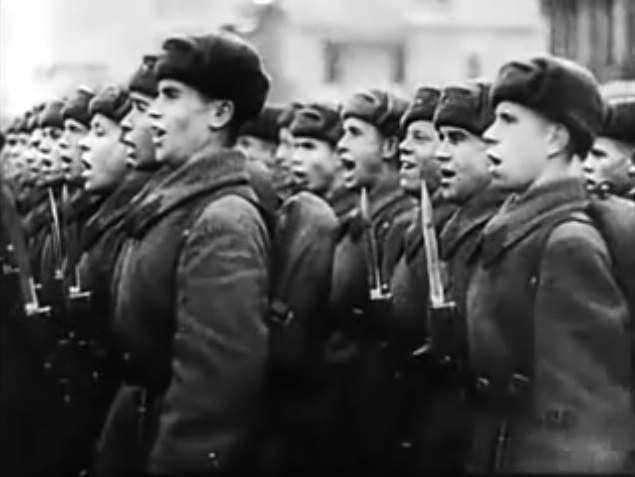
Soldiers cheering on Stalin.

Before the parade commenced the then General Secretary of the All-Union Communist Party of the Soviet Union (Bolsheviks) and Premier of the USSR Joseph Stalin delivered the following address to the nation:

"Comrades, men of the Red Army and Red Navy, commanders and political commissioners, working men and working women, collective farmers-men and women, workers in the intellectual professions, brothers and sisters in the rear of our enemy who have temporarily fallen under the yoke of the German brigands, and to our valiant men and women guerillas who are destroying the rear of the German invaders!

On behalf of the Soviet Government and our Bolshevik Party, I am greeting you and congratulating you on the twenty-fourth anniversary of the Great October Socialist Revolution.

Comrades, it is in strenuous circumstances that we are to-day celebrating the twenty-fourth anniversary of the October Revolution. The perfidious attack of the German brigands and the war which has been forced upon us have created a threat to our country. We have temporarily lost a number of regions, the enemy has appeared at the gates of Leningrad and Moscow. The enemy reckoned that after the very first blow our army would be dispersed, and our country would be forced to her knees. But the enemy gravely miscalculated. In spite of temporary reverses, our Army and Navy are heroically repulsing the enemy’s attacks along the entire front and inflicting heavy losses upon him, while our country—our entire country—has organized itself into one fighting camp in order, together with our Army and our Navy, to encompass the rout of the German invaders.

There were times when our country was in a still more difficult position. Remember the year 1918, when we celebrated the first anniversary of the October Revolution. Three-quarters of our country was at that time in the hands of foreign interventionists. The Ukraine, the Caucasus, Central Asia, the Urals, Siberia and the Far East were temporarily lost to us. We had no allies, we had no Red Army—we had only just begun to create it; there was a shortage of food, of armaments, of clothing for the Army. Fourteen states were pressing against our country. But we did not become despondent, we did not lose heart. In the fire of war we forged the Red Army and converted our country into a military camp. The spirit of the great Lenin animated us at that time for the war against the interventionists. And what happened? We routed the interventionists, recovered all our lost territory, and achieved victory.

To-day the position of our country is far better than twenty-three years ago. Our country is now many times richer than it was twenty-three years ago as regards industry, food and raw materials. We now have allies, who together with us are maintaining a united front against the German invaders. We now enjoy the sympathy and support of all the nations of Europe who have fallen under the yoke of Hitler’s tyranny. We now have a splendid Army and a splendid Navy, who are defending with their lives the liberty and independence of our country. We experience no serious shortage of either food, or armaments or army clothing. Our entire country, all the peoples of our country, support our Army and our Navy, helping them to smash the invading hordes of German fascists. Our reserves of man-power are inexhaustible. The spirit of the great Lenin and his victorious banner animate us now in this patriotic war just as they did twenty-three years ago.

Can there be any doubt that we can, and are bound to, defeat the German invaders?

The enemy is not so strong as some frightened little intellectuals picture him. The devil is not so terrible as he is painted. Who can deny that our Red Army has more than once put the vaunted German troops to panic flight? If one judges, not by the boastful assertions of the German propagandists, but by the actual position of Germany, it will not be difficult to understand that the German-fascist invaders are facing disaster. Hunger and impoverishment reign in Germany to-day; in four months of war Germany has lost four and a half million men; Germany is bleeding, her reserves of man-power are giving out, the spirit of indignation is spreading not only among the peoples of Europe who have fallen under the yoke of the German invaders but also among the German people themselves, who see no end to war. The German invaders are straining their last efforts. There is no doubt that Germany cannot sustain such a strain for long. Another few months, another half-year, perhaps another year, and Hitlerite Germany must burst under the pressure of her crimes.

Comrades, men of the Red Army and Red Navy, commanders and political instructors, men and women guerillas, the whole world is looking to you as the force capable of destroying the plundering hordes of German invaders. The enslaved peoples of Europe who have fallen under the yoke of the German invaders look to you as their liberators. A great liberating mission has fallen to your lot. Be worthy of this mission! The war you are waging is a war of liberation, a just war. Let the manly images of our great ancestors—Alexander Nevsky, Dmitry Donskoy, Kuzma Minin, Dmitry Pozharsky, Alexander Suvorov and Mikhail Kutuzov—inspire you in this war! May the victorious banner of the great Lenin be your lodestar!

For the complete destruction of the German invaders! Death to the German invaders!

Long live our glorious Motherland, her liberty and her independence!

Under the banner of Lenin, forward to victory!"

== Parade in Kuybyshev ==
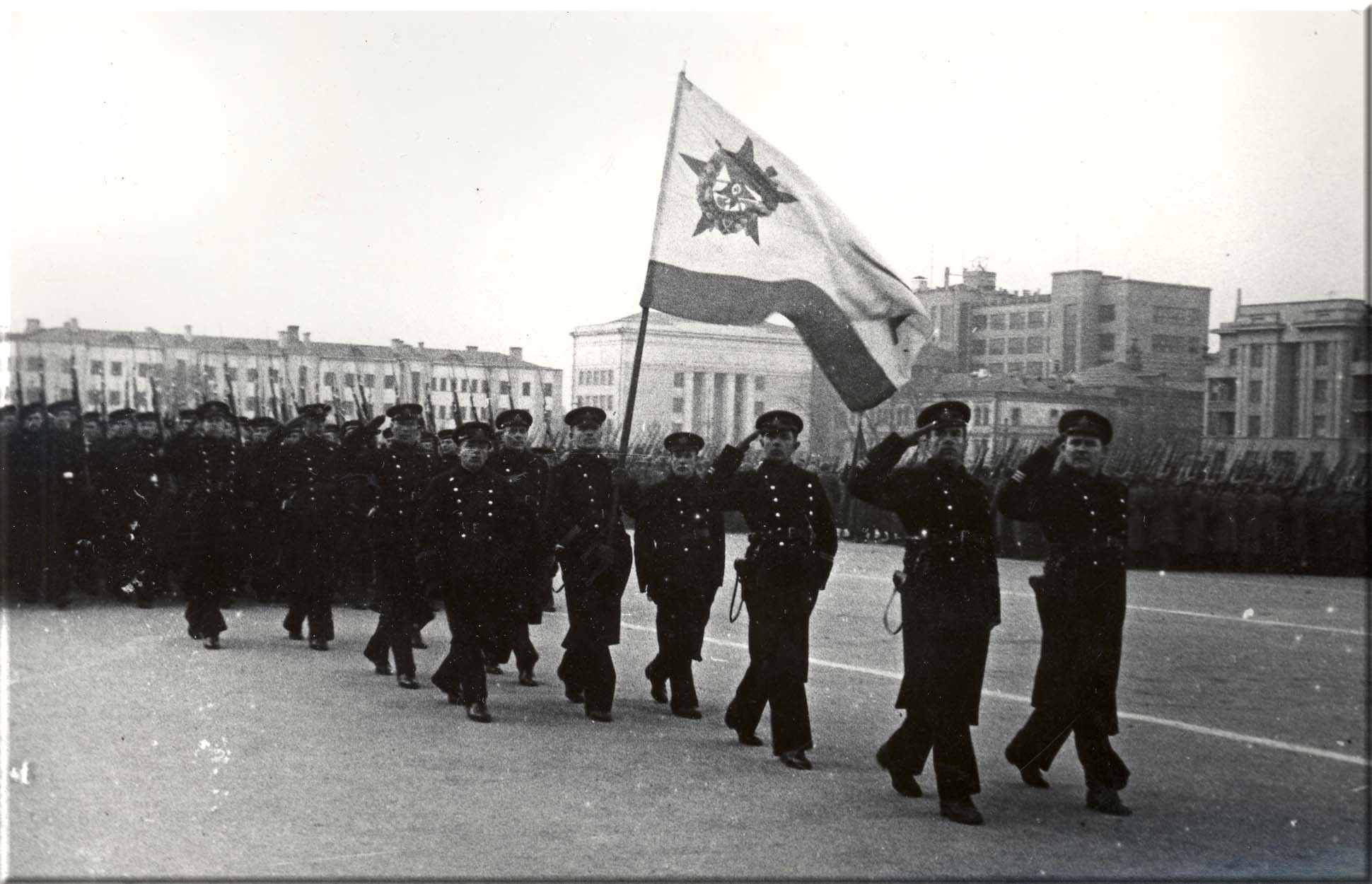
The parade in Kuybyshev Square, Samara

The other national parade held was at Kuybyshev (today Samara), at the grounds of Kuybyshev Square, attended by officials of the All-Union Communist Party, the Council of People's Commissars and the Supreme Soviet, high-ranking officers of the Soviet Armed Forces and the diplomatic corps, on the grounds of the city being a wartime national capital in the case of Moscow having fallen into Axis hands. The parade commander was then-Lieutenant General Maksim Purkayev, commanding general of the 60th Army, while it was inspected by the former People's Commissar of Defense, Marshal Kliment Voroshilov, who later gave the national holiday message following the inspection. It was his final inspection of an October Revolution parade and the only one he inspected outside the capital. An estimated 15,000 military servicemen took part, alongside more than 140 military vehicles and equipment and 217 aircraft, followed by a civilian demonstration of citizens from the city as well as refugees from the western cities. A 360-man massed bands contingent of the Volga Military District provided the ceremonial music.

=== Full order of the Kuybyshev Parade ===
- Corps of Drums
- Corps of Cadets, Military Medical Academy
- Brigade from the 65th Rifle Division
- Brigade from the 239th Rifle Division
- Air defense battalion
- Naval battalion
- Battalion of Internal Troops of the NKVD

== Parade in Voronezh ==
In Voronezh, the parade of the troops of the Southwestern Front took place on October Square (currently Lenin Square), and was presided over by Marshal Semyon Timoshenko. The rostrum was filled with the leaders of regional party organizations, among other guests such as Polish communist writer Wanda Wasilewska, the Ukrainian literary figure Oleksandr Korniychuk, and future Soviet leader Nikita Khrushchev. At 11:30 am, to the sounds of a 300-member military band led by the famous Voronezh composer Konstantin Massalitinov, the parade of the Voronezh Garrison began. Tanks marched in white camouflage to the sound of the Cavalry Trot by Semyon Tchernetsky. The parade lasted no more than an hour and a half. After the war, the parade took a backseat in historical importance.

=== Full order of the Voronezh parade ===
- Massed Bands
- Personnel of the 327th Rifle Division
  - Infantry
  - Artillery
  - Mechanized columns equipped with
    - BA-64 armored cars
    - ZIS-5 trucks
    - M-72 motorcycles
    - GAZ-67 jeeps
    - Willys MB jeeps
    - Katyusha rocket launchers

== Legacy of the parades of 1941 ==
Today, the legacy of the twin parades held during the first year of the Great Patriotic War in the cities of Moscow and Samara serves as a reminder of the resistance of the Russian people and her armed forces, as part of the wider Soviet Union, against the aggression brought upon by Nazi Germany, in the Eastern Front of the Second World War. Millions of Russians who live in the wider areas of these two cities have or had family members and relatives who marched in these parades and/or fought during the conflict and consider these parades part of the wider history of Russia and of their families. Thus, the anniversaries of the parades of 1941 are for many Russians held in high esteem as a show of force against the fascist enemy and of Russia's determination to defeat any form of international aggression, as well as for the country to show to her people and the young the values of patriotism, remembrance of the fallen, love of country, and service in the armed forces. Every year, on 7 November, the two cities hold commemorative parades not just to remember the hundreds of thousands of their residents who fought and died in the Second World War, but to forever maintain the memories that these two parades had on their cities' long history.

=== Military memorial parade in Moscow's Red Square ===
Commemorative parades have since the late 1990s marked the more memorable and famous 1941 parade on Moscow's Red Square with personnel of the Moscow Garrison, cadets of armed forces academies, servicemen of military units, the Young Army Cadets National Movement, cadets of military cadet schools and young men and women under youth uniformed and volunteer organizations within the capital city and its environs, with over 5,800 taking part. The march of veterans of the 1941 parade was first held in Russia in 2000. In 2003, the City Government of Moscow revamped that event as a parade of youth organizations and cadet schools. Two years later, the parade's anniversary was marked with a demonstration of wartime equipment and vehicles. A nationally televised event, it is attended by the few living veterans of the war, families of deceased servicemen and veterans, the diplomatic corps, cadets of the armed forces, and veterans of recent conflicts, with the Mayor of Moscow as the guest of honor. The parade commander, since 2014, has been a Colonel in active service of the armed forces. The ceremonial music for the parade is provided by the massed military bands of the Moscow Capital Garrison, under the baton of the Senior Director of Music of the Military Band Service. Since 2015, the parade begins with the march on in slow time of the Flag of Russia and the Victory Banner, imitating that of the Victory Day Parade earlier in the year. The 2012 parade was also marked as the final event concluding a year of celebrations of the bicentennial jubilee of the French invasion of Russia and the historic Battle of Borodino.

The 2020 parade, earmarked as the final event in a year of celebrations of the diamond jubilee of the victory in the Second World War in Europe, was canceled due to the COVID-19 pandemic in Russia. Alternative small celebrations are slated to take its place as a local kick-off to the celebrations of the 80th anniversary of the parade slated in 2021, which by itself represent the end of a year of national commemorations of the 80th anniversary of the outbreak of the war in the territories of the former Soviet Union.

Following the order to commence the march past in quick time, the order of the parade is as follows:

- Massed Bands of the Moscow Garrison
  - Band of the 154th Preobrazhensky Regiment,
  - Band of the Combined Arms Academy of the Armed Forces of the Russian Federation
  - Band of the Military University of the Ministry of Defense of the Russian Federation
  - Band of the Moscow Higher Combined Arms Command School
  - Band of the 147th Automobile Base
  - Band of the 27th Guards Motorized Rifle Brigade
  - Band of the 1st Semyonovsky Independent Rifle Regiment
- Corps of Drums of the Moscow Military Music College
- 154th Preobrazhensky Independent Commandant's Regiment Colour Guard
- Combined color guard and color guard of front standards
- 1st Honour Guard Company of the 3rd Honor Guard Battalion, 154th PICR
- Historical battalion made up of:
  - Military University of the Ministry of Defense
  - Moscow Higher Military Command School
  - 27th Guards Motorized Rifle Brigade
  - Gagarin-Zhukovsky Air Force Academy
  - Peter the Great Military Academy of the Strategic Missile Forces
  - Engineering Forces, Nuclear, Biological and Chemical Defence and Control Military Academy "Marshal of the Soviet Union Semyon Timoshenko"
  - Separate Operational Purpose Division, National Guard Forces Command
- Suvorov Military School
- Moscow National Guard Presidential Cadet School
- Moscow Cadet Corps of the Investigative Committee of Russia
- Moscow Cadet Fire Corps of the Civil Defense Academy, Ministry of Emergency Situations
- Moscow Young Army Patriotic Cadets Unit (on behalf of the Young Army Cadets National Movement)
- Moscow University of Maritime Transportation
- Moscow Unit of the Labor Reserves All-Russia Volunteer Sports Association
- Composite battalion of Moscow units of DOSAAF
- Combined cadet regiment of Moscow area cadet schools and courses
  - Moscow National Pensions School Cadet Corps
  - 1st Moscow Cadet Corps
  - Boarding School for Girls of the Ministry of Defense of Russia
  - Moscow Sea Cadet Corps of the Navigation and Mathematics School
  - Moscow Sea Cadet Corps "Heroes of Sevastopol"
  - Moscow Cadet Corps "Heroes of Stalingrad"
  - Moscow Cadet Corps "Space Heroes"
  - Moscow Military Music Cadet Corps
  - Moscow 1st Cadet Corps of the Border Service of the Federal Security Service
  - Moscow Justice Cadet Corps
  - Moscow Diplomatic Cadet Corps
  - Moscow Cossack Cadets
  - Preobrazhensky Cadet Corps
  - Petrovsky Cadet Corps
  - St. George Cadet Corps
  - Moscow Chemical Cadet Corps
  - Tagansky Cadet Corps
  - Moscow Police Cadet Corps

=== Civil-military memorial parade in Kuybyshev Square, Samara ===
The Samara parade of 1941 has been remembered more recently beginning in 2011; the city government hosts a large civil-military parade at Kuybyshev Square in the city proper to honor the thousands who marched before state, political, and military leaders on that square in the winter of 1941. Also a televised event, the Mayor of Samara is the parade's guest of honor, reviewing more than 10,000 marchers from the armed forces, civil services, veterans, and students of cadet schools in Samara and neighboring regions of the country, making it far larger than the Moscow parade. Beginning in 2014, the parade has also included a civil march of students, professionals, athletes, and distinguished citizens in memory of the civilian marchers of the memorable 1941 parade. Since the city became the de facto wartime capital of the Soviet Union when the Axis forces approached Moscow, the Samara parade is a chance for the city's people to recall one of the more famous chapters of its long history. Since its commencement in 2011, it has adopted the march in the slow time of the Moscow parade. After a two-year break due to the COVID-19 pandemic, the commemorative parade resumed in 2022.

Starting with the parade of 2017, the city garrison's massed bands play The Internationale as the colour guard, including the naval ensign of the Amur Military Flotilla and the flags of the two infantry divisions which took part in the original parade, marches into the square to take its place of honor in the lead of the formation.
