= Vasily Agapkin =

Soviet-Russian composer (1884–1964)

Vasily Ivanovich Agapkin
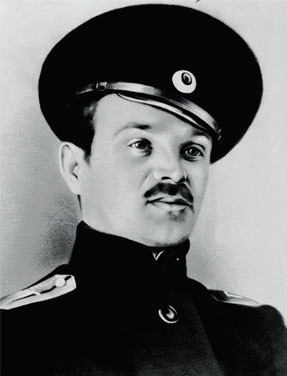
- Agapkin in the 1910s
- Born: February 3, 1884; Shancherovo, Ryazan Governorate, Russian Empire
- Died: October 29, 1964 (aged 80); Moscow, Russian SFSR, USSR
- Occupations: Composer, conductor
- Known for: "Farewell of Slavianka"

"Farewell of Slavianka"
Agapkin's "Farewell of Slavianka" performed by the United States Coast Guard Band

Vasily Ivanovich Agapkin (Russian: Васи́лий Ива́нович Ага́пкин; 3 February 1884 – 29 October 1964) was a Russian and Soviet military orchestra conductor, composer, and author of the well-known march "Farewell of Slavianka" (composed in 1912).

Agapkin was born in Ryazan Governorate in 1884. From 1912 to 1915, he studied at the Tambov musical school, where he composed the popular Russian patriotic march "Farewell of Slavianka"; he later served in the army.

After the October Revolution, Vasily Agapkin voluntarily joined the Red Army in 1918 and organized a brass band in the 1st Red Hussar Regiment.

In 1920, Agapkin returned to Tambov, directing the music studio and the orchestra of the GPU troops. On August 5, 1922, Agapkin and his orchestra gave a farewell concert in Tambov, after which they moved to Moscow.

In January 1924, the Agapkin Orchestra took part in the ceremony during the state funeral of Vladimir Lenin. In 1928, Agapkin organized a brass band of street children, which for many of them was the beginning of a professional career as a musician. In the 1930s, he headed the orchestra of the Higher School of the NKVD of the USSR, with which he made a number of recordings.

He was notably the bandmaster for the Band of the Dzerzhinsky Division of the NKVD. Agapkin led the combined Russian military bands during the famous Red Square October Revolution Parade in Moscow on 7 November 1941. "Farewell of Slavianka" was one of the four marches that were played in that Parade, and in honor of his role there it has been played as the final march in Victory Day Parades all over Russia.

His music has appeared in many films including The Cranes Are Flying (1957) and 72 Meters (2004).

== Works ==
- "Farewell of Slavianka" - march
- "Magic Dream" - waltz
- "Musician's Love" - waltz (applies to unpublished)
- "Blue Night" - waltz
- "Orphan" - waltz
- "Night over Moscow" - waltz
- "Daughter of the Street" - instrumental piece
- "On the Shore of the Black Sea" - instrumental piece
- "A marching march on the themes of Mongolian folk songs"
- "March to motives from the opera" Carmen "
- "March to motives from the opera" Faust ""
- "March on the themes of revolutionary songs"
- Farewell March (unpublished)
- "Waltz" (refers to unpublished)
- "Merry Rest" - polka
- "DneproGES" - instrumental play
- "Wounds of the Mind" - instrumental piece
- "Cavalry March"
- "Katenka" - polka
- "Katya, Katyusha" - instrumental piece
- "Chinese Serenade" - instrumental piece
- "Krakowiak" - dance
- "Blacksmiths" - instrumental piece
- "Lieutenant" ("Lieutenant") - march
- "Favorite March" - song
- "Lucins Eyes" - instrumental piece
- "Mazurka" - dance
- "My Memories" - Potpourri
- "My Fantasy" - instrumental piece
- "Neapolitan Nights" - instrumental piece
- "Pa d'espan" - dance
- "Pad de grasse" - dance
- "Padecatre" - dance
- "Flight into the Stratosphere" - instrumental play
- "Polka" - dance
- "Potpourri of Songs and Dances" - Potpourri
- "Hello VKP" - instrumental piece
- "Early morning" - waltz
- "Dawn over Moscow" - waltz
- "Tales" - waltz
- "Old Waltz" - instrumental piece
- "Groan of Warsaw" - waltz
- "Magic tricks are simple (jazz piece)" - instrumental piece
