= 154th Preobrazhensky Independent Commandant's Regiment =

Russian Armed Forces unit

- 154-й отдельный комендантский Преображенский полк
- Great emblem of the 154th ICR
- Active: 1979–present
- Country: Soviet Union (1979–91); Russia (1992–present)
- Allegiance: President of Russia
- Branch: Russian Armed Forces
- Type: Infantry Regiment
- Role: Memorial Affairs, Ceremonies and Special Events (one battalion); Military security (two battalions); Special Forces (one independent company)
- Size: One regiment of three battalions and two independent companies
- Part of: Military Commandant of Moscow
- Garrison/HQ: Lefortovo Barracks, Lefortovo District, Moscow
- Mottos: Положение обязывает (Polozhenie obyazyvaet) (Noble Obligation)
- Colors: Blue and Red
- March: Quick: Ballad of a Soldier; Slow: Preobrazhensky Regiment March
- Anniversaries: 12 April (raising of the Honor Guard Company)

Commanders
- Current commander: Colonel Sergey Beassanov
- Commander of the 154th ICR 3rd Battalion: Lieutenant Colonel Alexander Kurov
- Notable commanders: Colonel Dmitriy Strekha

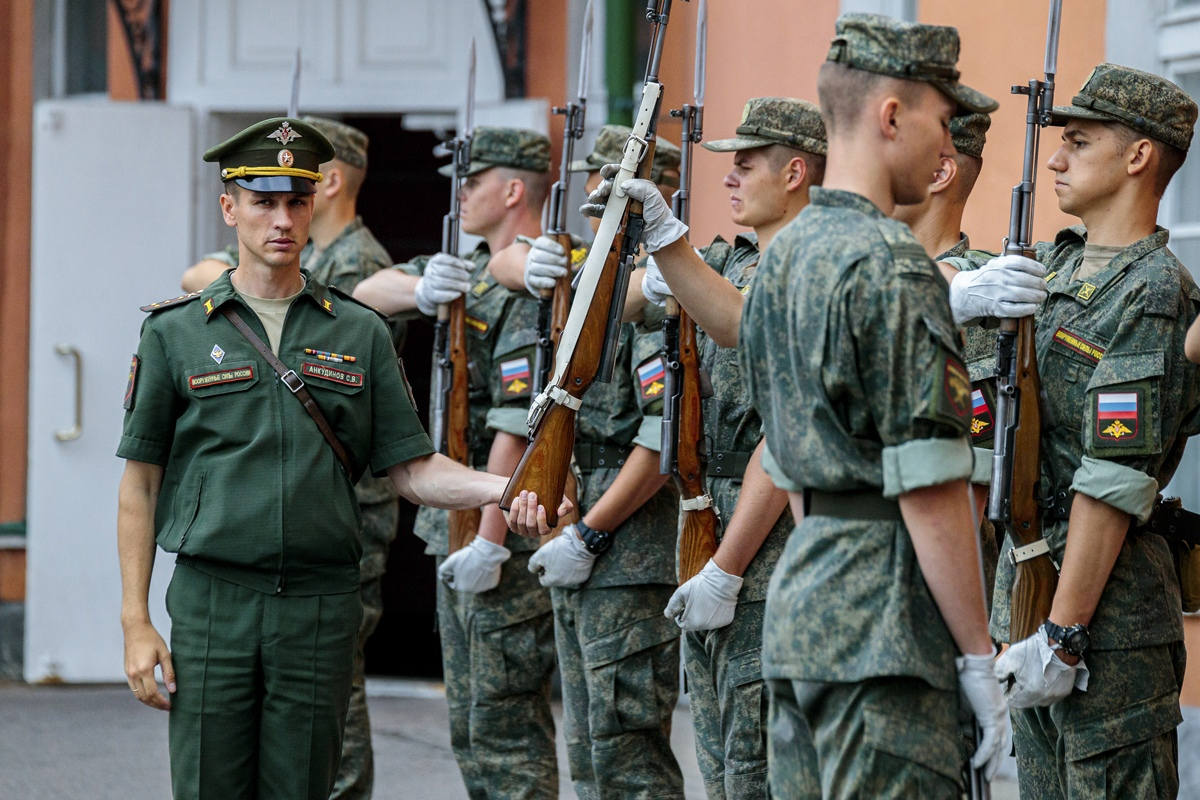
The first military training of the Preobrazhensky regiment

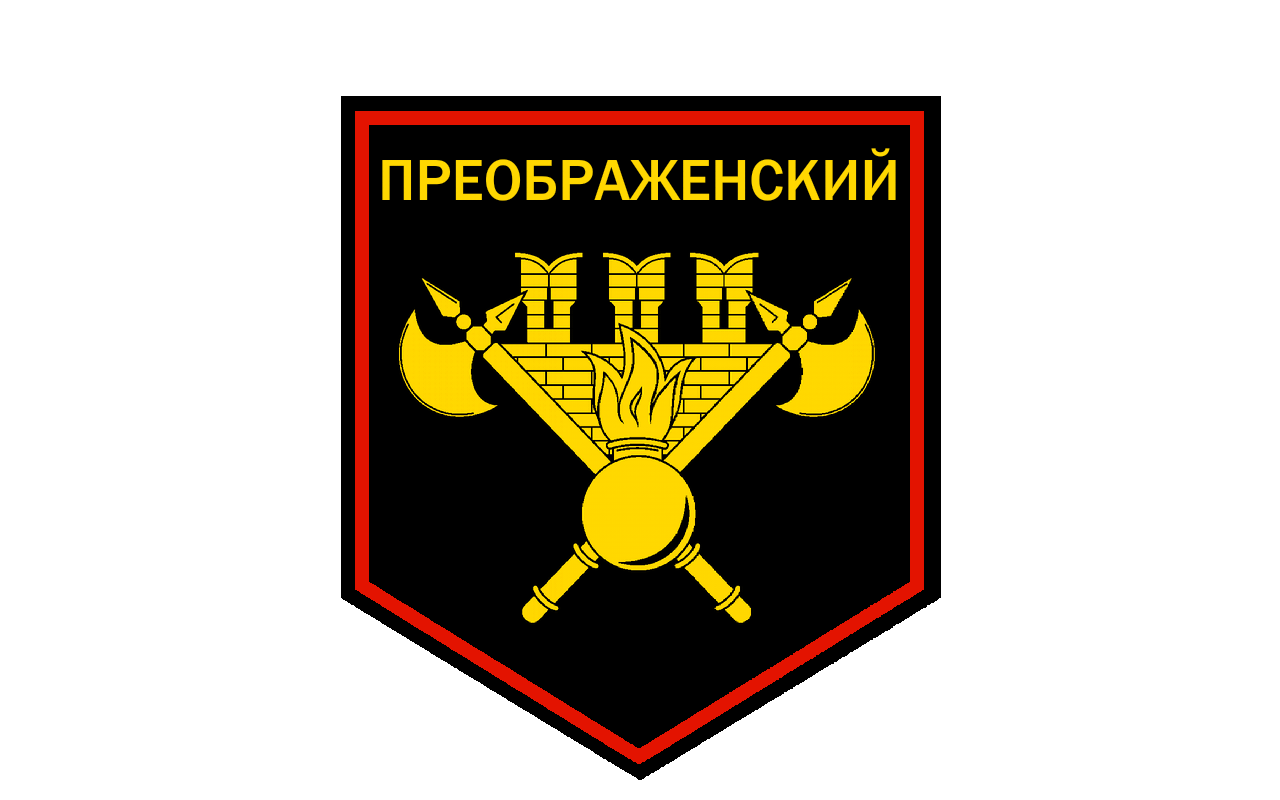
154th ICR patch worn by Russian Ground Forces personnel

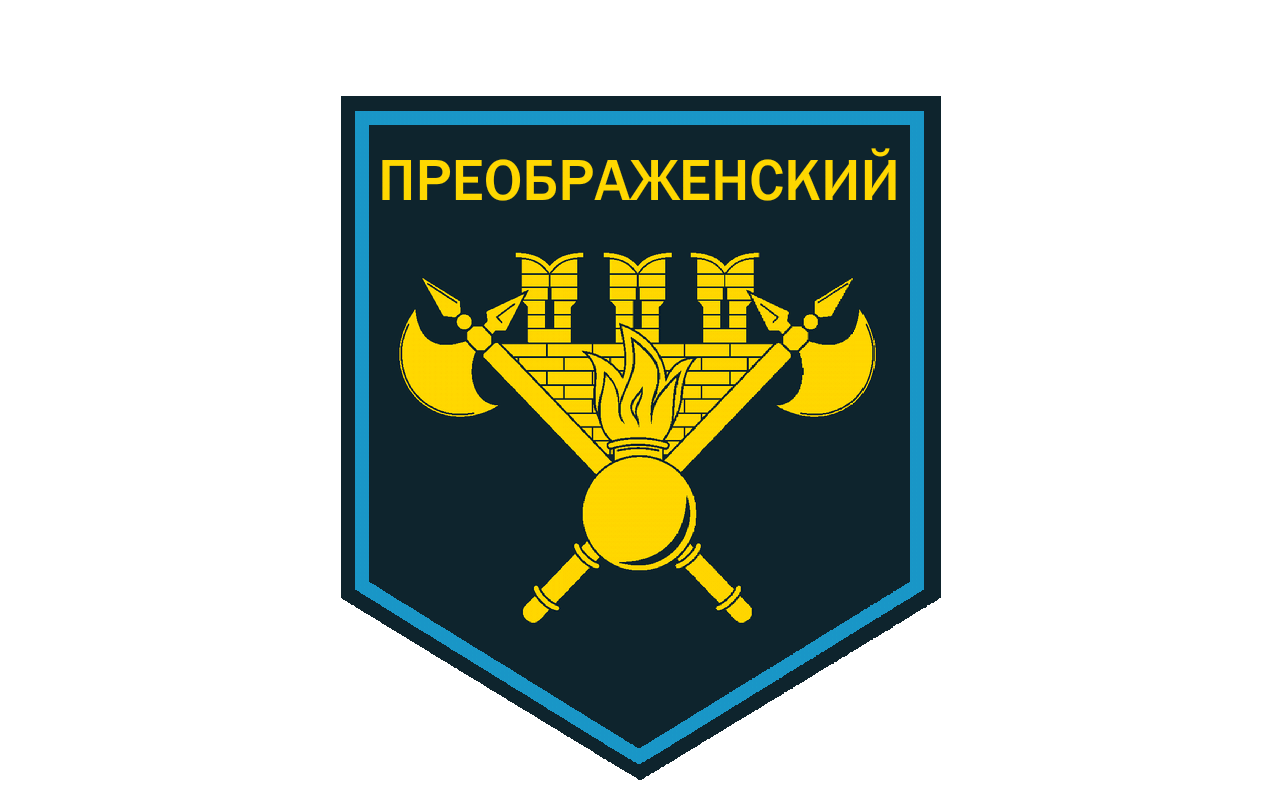
154th ICR patch worn by Russian Air Force personnel

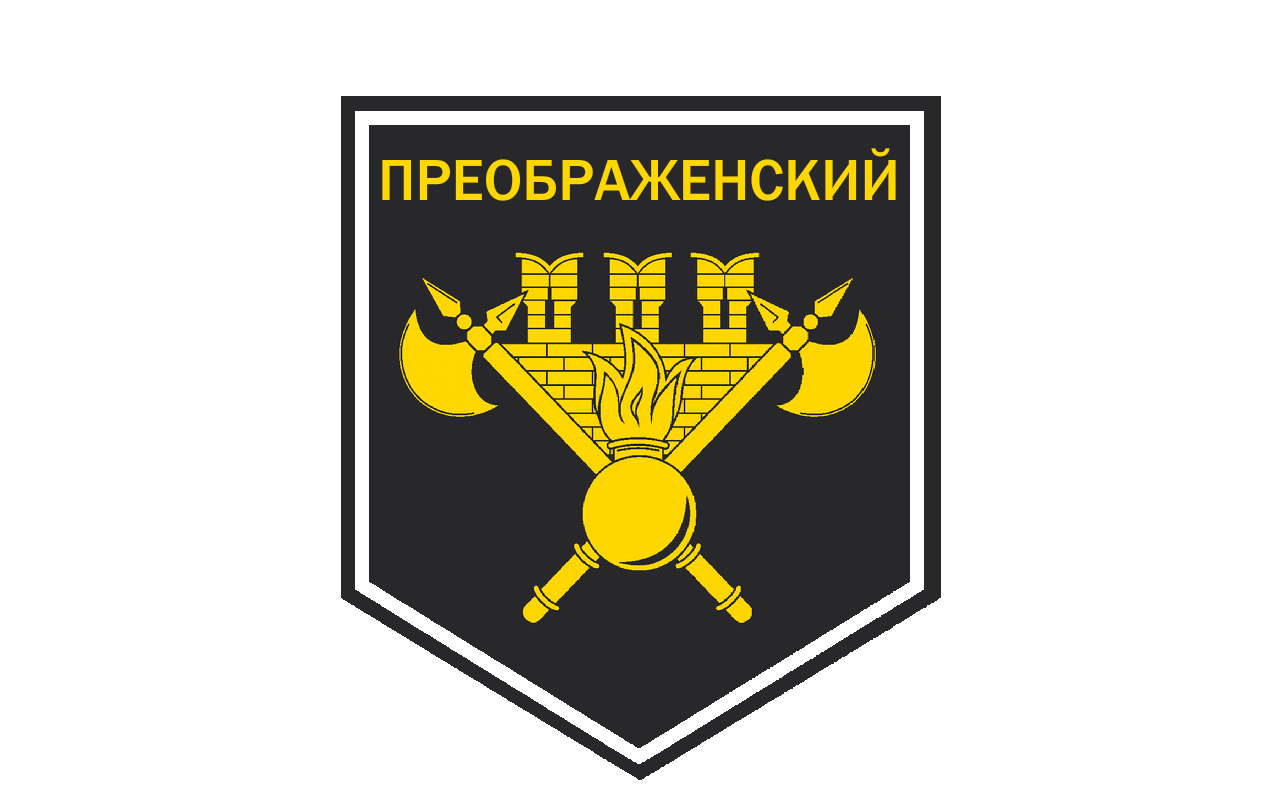
154th ICR patch worn by Russian Navy personnel

154th Preobrazhensky Independent Commandant's Regiment serves as the official honor guard regiment of the Russian Armed Forces and serves as the main honor guard unit of the armed forces, stationed in Moscow. Aside from being the honor guard unit, it is also charged with duties assisting the Commander, Moscow Garrison, and to serve garrison and protection duties in the protection of the capital city and its military infrastructure. Its barracks is at Lefortovo District, Moscow, part of the South-Eastern Administrative Okrug.

== History ==
As the Second World War was ending in Europe in 1944 the Soviet NKVD in Moscow was charged with raising a full-time honor guard company as part of the 1st Regiment, OMSDON (then the NKVD 1st Special Duties Division), in the style and manner of the British Household Division's Foot Guards, the 3rd US Infantry Regiment (The Old Guard) and the French Republican Guard's First Infantry Regiment. Its first duties included the state visit of British Prime Minister Winston Churchill that year. It later joined the 73rd Special Duties Battalion (later the 465th Special Duties Company, later itself renamed the 465th Special Commandant's Company) in 1948, now part of the regular armed forces. This was the precursor of the Honor Guard Company that would later form the 154th ICR of today, the very company in which the Victory Banner was welcomed with full honors in June 1945 into Moscow.

On 10 April 1949, the 465th SCC, by order of the Soviet Armed Forces General Staff, became the 99th Independent Commandant's Battalion. On 29 November 1956, by order of the Council of Ministers of the Soviet Union, the 1st Independent Honor Guard Company and the Military Band of the Honor Guard were raised, both under the supervision of the Office of the Moscow Military Garrison Commandant. The company adopted full parade dress in 1960 in the uniforms of the 3 service arms of the Soviet Armed Forces: the Soviet Army, Soviet Air Forces and the Soviet Navy in its three platoons. The regulations for such use were amended via a 1971 General Orders of the Ministry of Defense of the Soviet Union, to be used only in state occasions, ceremonies and national holidays when permitted.

In December 1979, on the recommendation of the Soviet Army General Staff the 99th ICB became the 154th Independent Commandant's Regiment, therefore merging the 99th ICB and the 1st IHGC and raising new component units. Its duty was for the protection of the Moscow Garrison Commandant's headquarters and providing ceremonial guards in state events. In 1980 several servicemen from the regiment took part in the 1980 Olympic opening ceremony wearing civilian formal dress escorting the Olympic Flag. The regiment's Special Duties Company took part in Exercise Zapad-81 the following year as part of the Soviet Armed Forces contingent, and received the Medal "For Courage in a Fire" for its fire fighting efforts that year when a fire broke out in the Moscow Oblast. The regiment took part in the 1985 World Festival of Youth and Students and in the 1987 commemorations of the 175th anniversary of the Battle of Borodino. In May 1991, the 1st Independent Honor Guard Company became the Honor Guard Battalion of the 154th ICR as another honor guard company was raised.

In 2006, an amateur theater was created within the regiment. The 154th Independent Commandant's Regiment formally became the 154th 'Preobrazhensky' Independent Commandant's Regiment (the "Preobrazhensky" honorific title was in tribute to the Preobrazhensky Regiment) on 9 April 2013 by presidential decree no. 326 signed by Russian president Vladimir Putin. Putin had previously outlined a plan to reinstate the regiment's honorific title in an address to the Russian Federal Assembly in 2012, with the stated aim being to "strengthen the historical continuity" of the Russian Armed Forces by resurrecting the names of "famous, legendary units and formations of the Russian and Soviet armies". On 10 September 2018, the Moscow House of the Young Army Cadets National Movement was inaugurated on part of the regimental barracks and depot complex.

== The 154th ICR today ==
The regiment today is made of more than a thousand servicemen from all units of the Russian Armed Forces, composed of 3 battalions (the Honor Guard Battalion. and the 1st and 2nd Commandant's Battalions) and other independent units comprising it, including its Special Duties Company. The 154th Independent Commandant's Regiment, and its predecessors, have been involved in various state and international events through the years. Aside from its duties at sporting events, other activities where they were involved include their attendance in various Soviet state funerals (including the Death and state funeral of Leonid Brezhnev) and in the Victory Day celebrations in Moscow from 1965 onward, where they always provide the honor guard unit and troop the Victory Banner on Red Square for the annual parade among other commemorative activities. Recent regimental enlistment and passing-out parades have been held on the historic Poklonnaya Hill - at the Museum of the Great Patriotic War, Moscow.

=== Foreign appearances ===
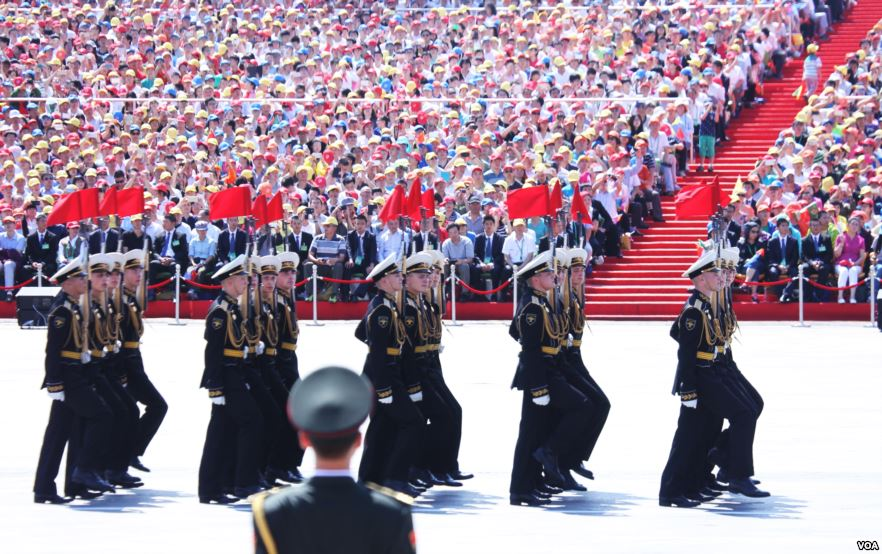
The regiment on Tiananmen Square.

Being a representative part of the Russian military, it is often asked to represent the nation at foreign military parades and ceremonies. One of its biggest foreign appearances was at the 2015 China Victory Day Parade, which celebrated the 70th anniversary of Victory over Japan Day of World War II. Within the Commonwealth of Independent States, it has represented the nation at small scale events, usually during presentations of war flags or the Victory Banner to these countries. Outside of the CIS sphere however, the regiment has been seen representing the nation on the national days of multiple countries, including Italy, France, Mexico, Libya, Venezuela and Vietnam.

=== Awards ===
- 1982 – Medal "For Courage in a Fire"
- 1 November 1994 – The Certificate of Honor of the President of the Russian Federation for its great contribution to the state visit of Queen Elizabeth II.
- 17 August 1995 – Certificate of Honor for its participation in the celebrations of the 50th anniversary of the end of the Second World War.
- 12 July 2011 – Diploma of the Supreme Commander-in-Chief of the Russian Armed Forces

== Regimental Structure ==
- Regiment HQ
- Engineers Service
- 1st Commandant's Battalion
- 2nd Commandant's Battalion
- Military Band
- 3rd Honor Guard Battalion
  - Battalion HQ
  - 1st Honor Guard Company
  - 2nd Honor Guard Company
  - Special Military Band of the Guard of Honor Battalion
- Special Duties Company
- Automotive Company
- MP Company

== Gallery ==
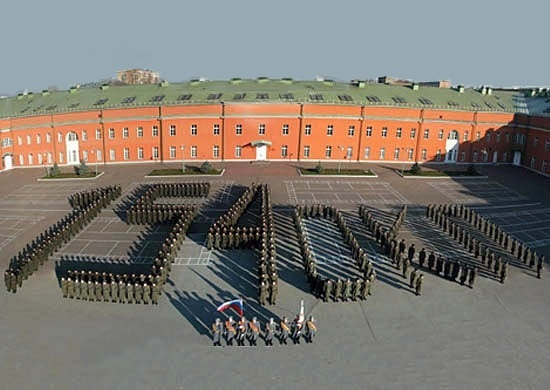
The formation of the regiment in the form of the number of the military unit

The Russian military honor guard from the 154th Commandant's Regiment welcomes U.S. Navy Adm. Mike Mullen at the Tomb of the Unknown Soldier (Moscow).

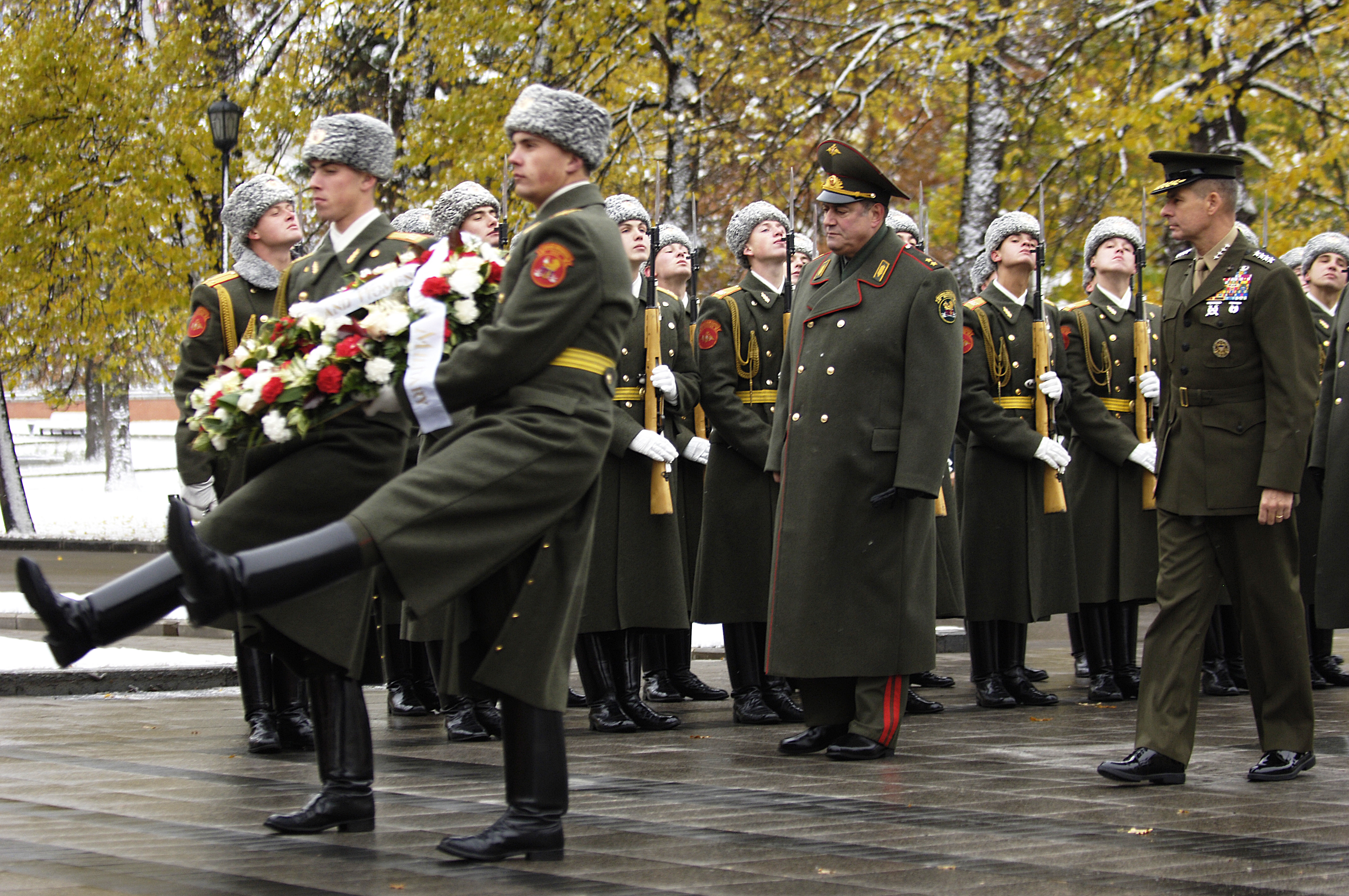
2006 wreath-laying with the 154th ICR

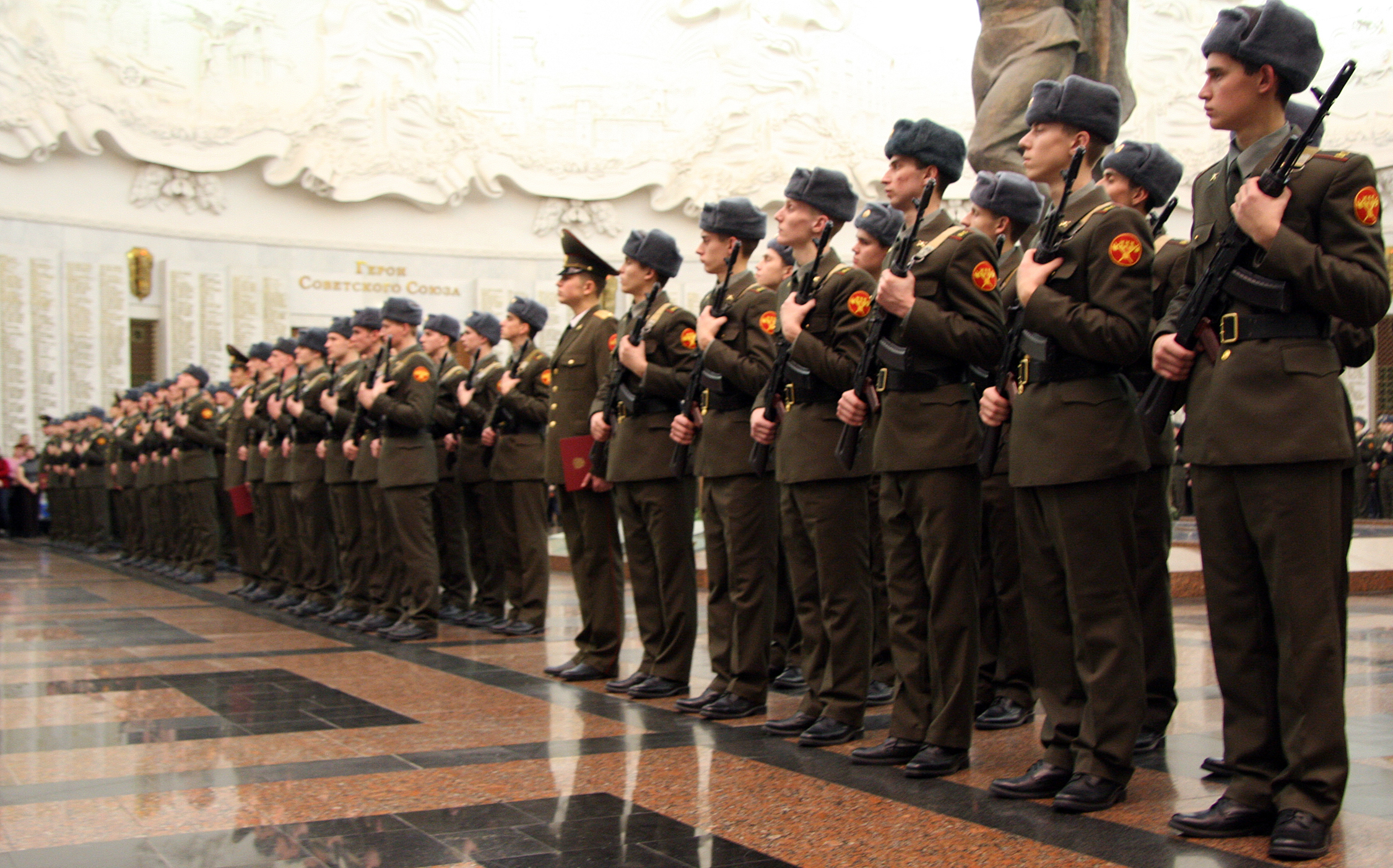
Military enlistment oath-taking ceremony

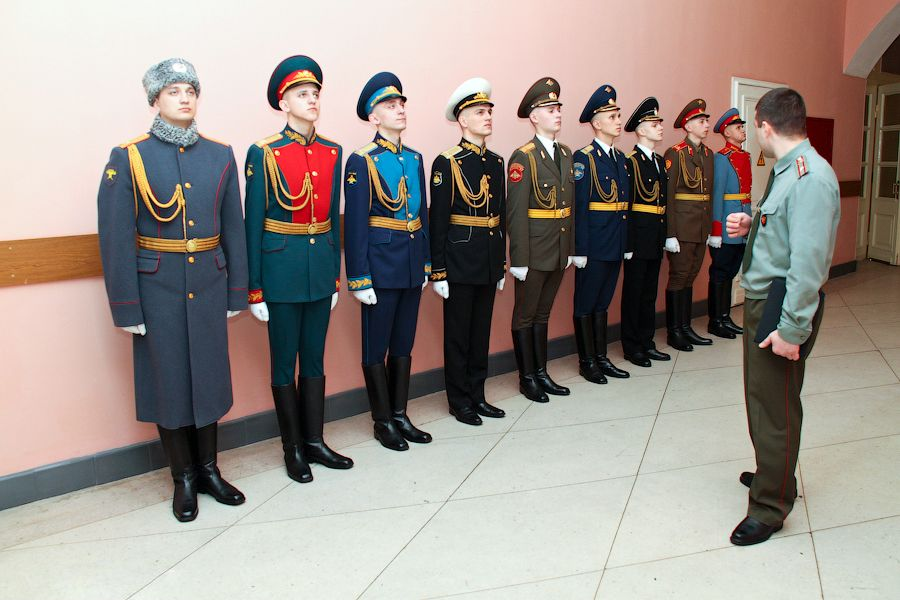
Different service and dress uniforms used by the 154th ICR's personnel

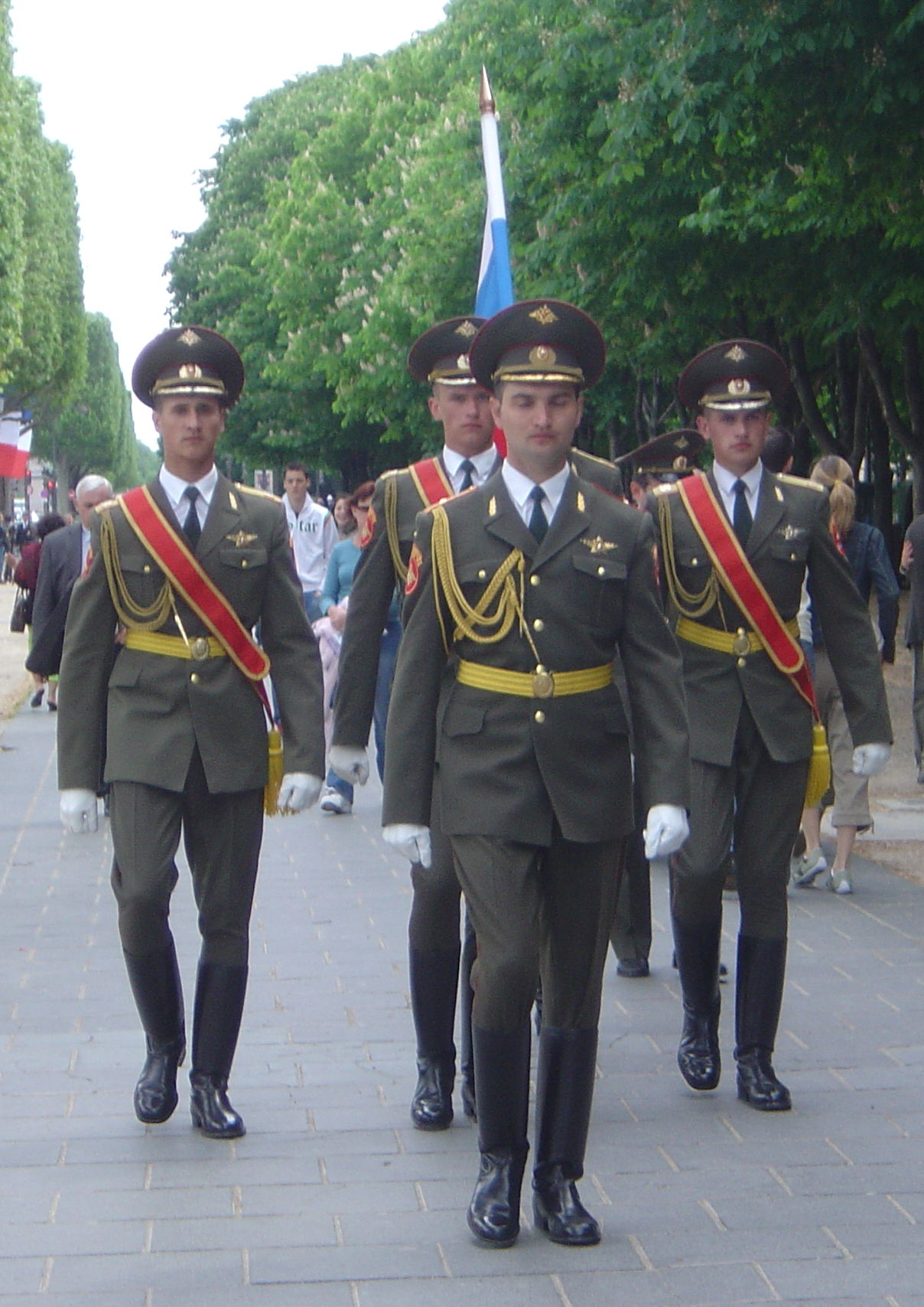
Soldiers of the 154th ICR on the Champs-Élysées following ceremonies celebrating the 60th anniversary of the Victory against Nazism.

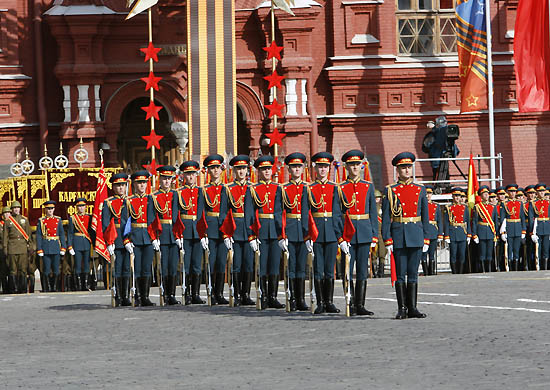
During the 2010 Moscow Victory Day Parade.

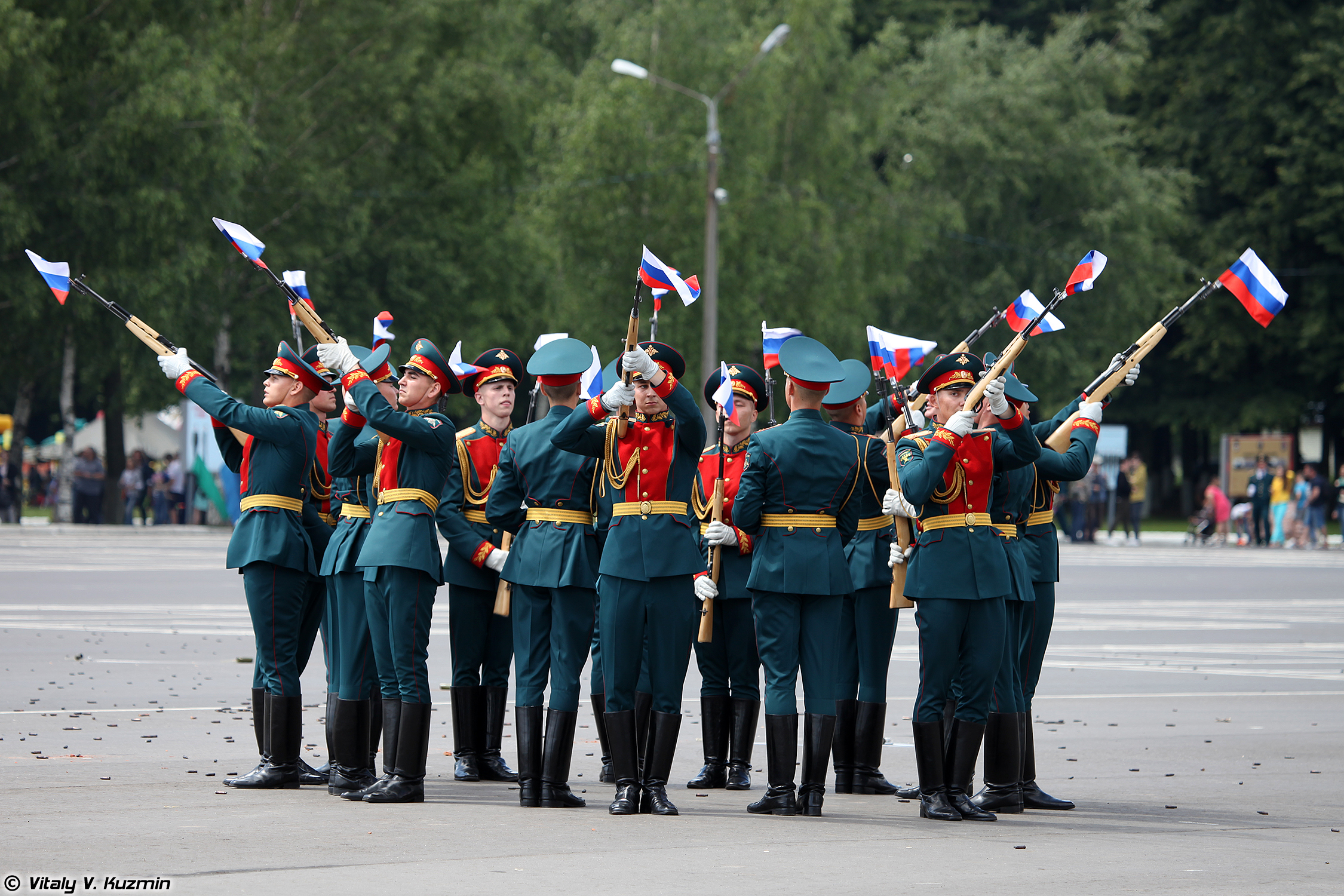
The drill team of regiment.

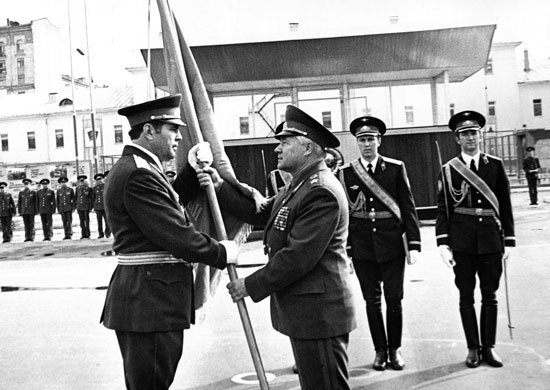
Vladimir Govorov presenting the banner of the regiment to the commander of 154th ICR on 29 June 1980.

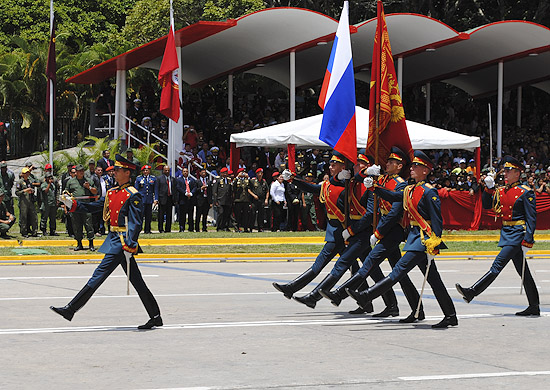
An honor guard from the 154th ICR during the Caracas Independence Day parade in 2011.

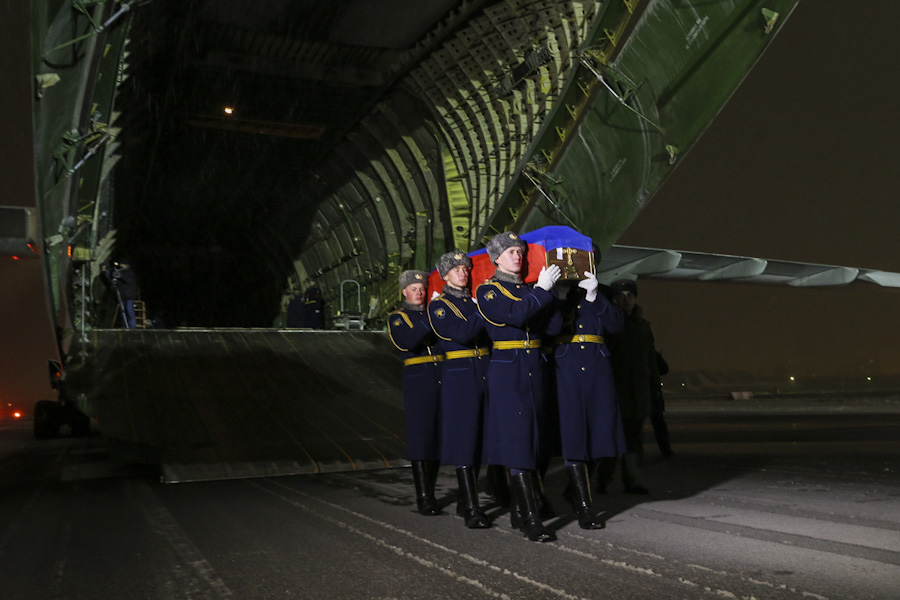
Members of the 154th ICR during the repatriation of Oleg Peshkov's body at Chkalovsky Airport.

== See also ==
- Kremlin Regiment
- Semyonovsky Regiment
- Band of the 154th Preobrazhensky Regiment
- Special Exemplary Military Band of the Guard of Honor Battalion of Russia
