= 112th Rifle Division =

112th Rifle Division (September 23, 1939 – August 31, 1941) 112th Motorized Rifle Division (September 1 - September 28, 1941) 112th Rifle Division (September 29 – October 10, 1941) 112th Rifle Division (January 20, 1942 – July 1945)
- Active: 1939–1945
- Country: Soviet Union
- Branch: Red Army (1939-46)
- Type: Infantry
- Size: Division
- Engagements: Operation Barbarossa; Baltic operation Battle of Smolensk (1941); Battle of Moscow; Battle of Kalach; Battle of Stalingrad; Sevsk-Truschevsk offensive Battle of Kursk; Battle of the Dnieper; Battle of Kiev (1943); Zhitomir–Berdichev offensive Lvov-Sandomierz Offensive; Vistula–Oder offensive Lower Silesian offensive Upper Silesian offensive Siege of Breslau
- Decorations: Order of the Red Banner; Order of Suvorov; Order of Kutuzov (all 2nd Formation)
- Battle honours: Rylsk; Korosten (both 2nd Formation)

Commanders
- Notable commanders: Col. Ivan Andreevich Kopyak; Col. Ivan Petrovich Sologub; Col. Ivan Efimovich Ermolkin; Maj. Gen. Porfirii Sergeevich Furt (Furtenko); Col. Pyotr Semyonovich Polyakov; Maj. Gen. Aleksandr Vasilevich Gladkov; Col. Dmitrii Tikhonovich Zhukov

The 112th Rifle Division was first formed as an infantry division of the Red Army in September 1939, in the Ural Military District, based on the shtat (table of organization and equipment) of that month. It began moving west from the Urals just prior to the German invasion, assigned to the 22nd Army of the High Command reserve, and completed its arrival in the Polotsk area on June 22. It completed its deployment along the Daugava River by June 30, just before it came under attack from two divisions of the German II Army Corps. Over the following week it put up a stiff defense of the old Stalin Line defenses behind the Sarja River until a third division was brought up, forcing it to begin a fighting withdrawal toward Nevel. Soon falling into encirclement with most of the rest of its Army west of that place it was forced to break out, mostly in small groups and as individuals. After its remnants were subordinated to the 170th Rifle Division in August they were withdrawn to be rebuilt into a motor rifle division, also numbered the 112th, at the start of September, but near the end of the month this decision was reversed and it was assigned to 16th Army as a regular rifle division. This Army was positioned not far east of Smolensk and very vulnerable to encirclement when the German offensive on Moscow was renewed on October 2. Reassigned to 20th Army it became trapped south of Vyazma and was effectively destroyed by October 10.

A new 112th was designated on January 20, 1942, in the Siberian Military District, based on a 400-series division formed in December. After it completed assembling it was sent west to the Moscow area, from where it was assigned to the 1st Reserve Army and sent south toward Stalingrad, where the Army was redesignated as the 64th. After initial battles along the Don River it was transferred to 62nd Army. Through September it fought in the city's suburbs, gradually retreating into the area around Mamayev Kurgan, which one of its regiments contested, before the weakened division was forced north into the factory district. When German 6th Army attacked the Dzerzhinskii Tractor Works on October 14 the partly-rebuilt 112th was overrun and largely destroyed, with its remnants withdrawing farther north before being evacuated across the Volga for a complete replenishment. After moving to the Reserve of the Supreme High Command at the end of December it continued rebuilding until it was assigned to the 2nd Tank Army in Central Front in February 1943. During that month and into March it advanced northwest of Kursk, briefly being assigned to 70th Army before moving to 60th Army. It saw little action during the Battle of Kursk, but in August joined Central Front's offensive to the west, winning its first battle honor for the capture of Rylsk. Following an advance through eastern Ukraine it crossed the Dniepr north of Kyiv and was reassigned to 1st Ukrainian Front while involved in inconclusive fighting through October before pushing to the west the following month and winning a second battle honor after the retaking of Korosten. Once the German attempt to recapture Kyiv was defeated the 112th went on the offensive again in January 1944, now as part of the same Front's 13th Army, and was awarded the Order of Suvorov. In July it took part in the offensive that encircled Brody and captured Lviv, and in the process won the Order of the Red Banner, before joining the push across the Vistula at Sandomierz. In January 1945 it broke out of this bridgehead and advanced across southern Poland into Silesia, where it would spend the remainder of the war. It took part in the Lower and Upper Silesian offensives during February and March, first attached to 4th Tank Army and later as part of 5th Guards Army, before being moved again to 6th Army, which was besieging Breslau until the end of the war. Shortly after the German surrender it was awarded the Order of Kutuzov, then was disbanded in July.

== 1st Formation ==
The first 112th began assembling in July 1939 in the Ural Military District with its headquarters at Perm, based on territorial units of the 82nd Rifle Division that remained in the District after its main body departed to Mongolia. The official date of formation was September 23, by which time Col. Nikolai Alekseevich Ulyanov had been appointed to command. On the same date Col. Fyodor Dmitrievich Rubtsov replaced Ulyanov, who went on to lead the 276th Rifle Division before being killed in action in the Crimea in 1941. Rubtsov also left the division on January 27, 1940; he would be promoted to Kombrig and then major general later that year and would be in command of the 66th Rifle Corps on September 17, 1941, when he was wounded and captured and then executed two days later. The 112th was under command of Col. Vasilii Mikhailovich Alekseev until November 23, who would later move to the armored forces and reach the rank of lieutenant general of tank troops before being killed in action in August 1944. His commanding officer for infantry, Kombrig Yan Siminovich Adamson, took over as acting divisional commander. This officer had been arrested during the Great Purge, and held for 18 months before his release in January 1940. He was still serving as acting commander at the time of the German invasion.

At this time the division was assigned to 51st Rifle Corps of 22nd Army, and its order of battle was as follows:

- 385th Rifle Regiment
- 416th Rifle Regiment
- 524th Rifle Regiment
- 436th Artillery Regiment
- 156th Antitank Battalion
- 270th Antiaircraft Battalion
- 196th Reconnaissance Company
- 159th Sapper Battalion
- 272nd Signal Battalion
- 198th Medical/Sanitation Battalion
- 225th Chemical Defense (Anti-gas) Platoon
- 33rd Motor Transport Battalion
- 148th Motorized Field Bakery
- 479th Field Postal Station
- 226th Field Office of the State Bank

The 51st Corps also had the 98th and 153rd Rifle Divisions, all under command of Maj. Gen. A. M. Markov. As the division unloaded at Dretun, Markov ordered Adamson to take up his planned positions from Krāslava and along the right bank of the Daugava River to northwest of Drissa, with the intention of preventing German forces from crossing the river. Already on the morning of June 22 the division's base camp was coming under air attack, although losses were light.

== Battle of Smolensk ==
The 112th was hampered in this move of up to 150km by lack of transport as most of the men marched, carrying their heavy weapons. Adamson formed a forward detachment of some 2,500 troops, including the 196th Reconnaissance Company, 156th Antitank Battalion, and two reinforced companies of the 416th Rifle Regiment, which used the available trucks to move toward Krāslava, the most distant objective. On the morning of June 26 the forward detachment went into action near that place against reconnaissance units of the LVI Motorized Corps. This limited action continued for several days as the division's main body moved up. The next day Col. Ivan Andreevich Kopyak arrived to take command from Adamson, who moved to the position of deputy commander. Kopyak had previously led the 203rd Rifle Division and would lead the 112th (including 112th Motor Rifle) for the duration of the 1st formation.

=== Battle for the Daugava ===
As part of 22nd Army the division found itself at the junction between Western and Northwestern Front, and in fact was moved between these commands for several days before finally coming under Western Front in early July. By the evening of June 30 the entire division had reached its line, and the next day the 3rd SS Motorized Division Totenkopf launched its first attack on Krāslava; this was reinforced on July 3 by the 121st Infantry Division of 16th Army's II Army Corps. The defending 416th Regiment was first hit by bombing, then artillery, but held the high ground at Zamkova Hill after two assaults. A further attempt on July 2 turned into hand-to-hand fighting in the trenches before the attackers were driven off, at considerable cost to both sides. Late that evening the regiment was ordered to abandon Krāslava due to the threat of encirclement of the division's units on the right. A counterattack the next day retook part of the town, but the remainder of the division was forced to retreat 10-15km to the east by the end of the day. By this time the 170th Rifle Division had joined 51st Corps, replacing the 153rd.

As the 21st Mechanized Corps of 27th Army was forced back on July 3 it uncovered the bridge at Dzisna, where 19th Panzer Division made a crossing. General Markov now ordered Kopyak to retreat to the east bank of the Sarja River, while also subordinating the 98th Division's 308th Rifle Regiment to his command. As the division fell back its 385th Rifle Regiment overran the headquarters of the 32nd Infantry Division's 96th Infantry Regiment, the aftermath of which was documented on film by newsreel cameramen and screened in cinemas on July 22. The positions on the Sarja were intended to cover the north flank of the Polotsk Fortified Region, part of the Stalin Line, which had been largely neglected since 1939. The 308th Regiment was to fall back farther to Drissa; the 98th, along with the 385th Regiment, was to counterattack and eliminate the bridgehead at Dzisna. The remainder of the 112th took up its new defense on July 5.

The fighting along the Sarja continued through July 6-9. The 416th Regiment held the center section, refurbishing the pillboxes of the Stalin Line where practicable; the attached 308th held from the village of Ustye along the right bank of the Daugava; the 196th Reconnaissance Company covered west of Lake Osveyskoye; and the 524th Rifle Regiment formed the second echelon. The advance of II Corps was cautious, with the 121st Infantry expecting a trap. It and the 32nd Infantry made a general attack on July 7, with the latter attempting to cross the Daugava near the mouth of the Sarja in an effort to get into the division's rear. This was stopped by artillery fire and counterattacks by reinforced elements of the 308th and 524th. The 121st was also repulsed by the 416th, whose reconnaissance elements took several prisoners. The next day the main attack came southwest of Lake Osveyskoye against the 416th following air attacks and an artillery preparation. Kopyak had been expecting further attacks at the mouth of the Sarja and was caught off guard. The attackers penetrated the positions of the 416th's 3rd Battalion and envelop its right flank, again threatening the division's rear. Kopyak and his head of artillery, Col. Mikhail Yakovlevich Lev, moved to the threatened sector with two battalions of the 524th to counterattack. An artillery duel ensued, followed by a charge by the riflemen which pushed the 121st back over the Sarja, but at the cost of 25 percent casualties to the 524th and the loss of an entire battery of artillery.

Overnight on July 8/9 the 308th, plus one battalion of the 524th, repulsed another attack over the Sarja. This was covering the movement of German artillery, which continued until midday. While the 121st conducted a reconnaissance-in-force against the 416th a battery of StuG IIIB assault guns was brought up from Krāslava to help deal with the Stalin Line bunkers. The reconnaissance had discovered a 0.9m-deep ford across the river which the assault guns were able to use to outflank the regiment and begin destroying its positions from the rear. The vehicles were able to reach the lines of the 436th Artillery where they came under direct fire, driving them back with losses, at the cost of 12 guns. II Corps now brought up the 12th Infantry Division to reinforce the 121st and 32nd in an attack along the entire length of the Sarja. By evening they had advanced 1-2km, and a counterattack by the 416th failed in the face of assault gun fire. By now the 112th had suffered 40 percent losses.

Western Front headquarters, under command of Marshal S. K. Timoshenko, sent an operational summary to the STAVKA at 2000 hours on July 11, which stated in part:

112th RD - holding off numerically superior enemy forces in the Volyntsy region with its left wing and fighting intensely with enemy tanks penetrating from Iukhovichi toward Kliastitsy at 1000 hours on 11 July.

The 98th Division was said to be continuing to hold against attempts to force the Drysa River. In his orders of July 14, Timoshenko directed the commander of 22nd Army, Lt. Gen. F. A. Yershakov, to "smooth out the front in the center by withdrawing 98th and 112th RDs to the Iukhovichi and Baravukha line, hold on to the Polotsk Fortified Region, attack toward Gorodok and Vitebsk to occupy and defend the Sirotino and Zuikovo front, and keep at least one RD in army reserve behind the left wing." This was an overly ambitious mission for divisions as hard-pressed as these. These plans were completely preempted when the LVII Motorized Corps, with the cooperation of 9th Army's L and XXIII Army Corps, drove 22nd Army out of its remaining defenses along the Daugava northwest of Polotsk, cut it into two parts, and threatened both with encirclement. The German armored units bypassed Polotsk and pushed north toward Nevel. On July 16 Timoshenko ordered Yershakov to withdraw to new defenses, stating:

The situation on 22nd Army's front permits and requires the defeat and destruction of the enemy by stubborn fighting along successive lines during a withdrawal to Alushkovo, Lake Ozerishche, and Dubrovo...
2. Close the penetration that has formed between 98th and 112th RDs with all of the army's forces at hand.

The 3rd Panzer Group had already begun a two-pronged advance from Vitebsk and by July 15 had pushed well over 500 tanks to the northeast outskirts of Smolensk and to Nevel. This town had already been serving as a collecting point for stragglers from 27th Army and 51st Corps, and also guarded the approaches to Velikiye Luki, 50km further northeast. It fell to 19th Panzer on the morning of July 16. Four of Yershakov's divisions, including the 112th and 98th, were now threatened with encirclement west of Nevel, while the remaining four were isolated between there and Vitebsk.

=== First Battle of Velikiye Luki ===
LVII Motorized Corps was now ordered to capture Velikiye Luki. This was accomplished at nightfall on July 18 with an isolated thrust by 19th Panzer and 14th Motorized Divisions. Over the previous two days the 112th and 98th, along with 51st Corps headquarters, had been fighting rearguard actions toward Nevel, finally reaching the village of Repishche, 12km to its northeast. 12th Infantry, advancing northwest of Pustoshka, linked up with 19th Panzer and completed the encirclement. The commander of Army Group North believed, from the papers found on a captured courier, that a total of 13 divisions were trapped, but the OKH was less optimistic. The elimination of the two pockets would effectively dispose of any threat to the Army Group's right flank as it advanced on Leningrad.

14th Motorized was especially overextended and vulnerable to counterattack, and the escaping troops of 51st and 62nd Rifle Corps pressed against the light screen it had erected south of Nevel and 12th Infantry's blocking positions north of that place. On July 19 the STAVKA ordered 29th Army to begin preparing an attack from the Toropets area toward Velikiye Luki with three divisions. Overnight on July 19/20 this force overran a sector lightly held by 14th Motorized and broke into the clear. 19th Panzer sent a battlegroup to intercept but this ran into unexpectedly stiff resistance. It then abandoned the city itself. Inside the pocket, Colonel Kopyak moved his troops toward the Leningrad Highway in order to capture the commanding height 202.4 that would be a springboard for the breakout. While the 436th Artillery and two battalions of the 385th Regiment covered the breakthrough force from the west near the village of Turki-Perevoz, the 416th Regiment, the remaining battalion of the 385th, and several units of the 98th Division set out to seize the height. This did not succeed immediately and the fighting became protracted. One battalion of the 416th was reduced to just 40 personnel remaining. This battle continued through the day, with the height changing hands twice; Maj. A. A. Budanov, commander of the 416th, was severely wounded, captured, and executed. Despite the failure of this effort it did serve to draw German troops from other sectors.

General Markov now ordered a new effort to break through the German defenses along the highway for the night of July 20/21. The weakened 416th, reinforced by a regiment of the 170th Division, was to organize a line northwestward toward Ust-Dolyssy after crossing the highway. The 308th Regiment of the 98th received a similar assignment, pushing to the southeast toward Nevel. The 524th Regiment would provide additional flank protection while the 436th Artillery and the 385th Regiment continued as rearguard. This attempt also failed; Kopyak later noted that the breakthrough units were not sufficiently concentrated and following units were slow to arrive. At one point German infantry overran his command post before being driven off by a counterattack. He now considered making a breakout to the south and southeast on the night of July 21/22 after destroying all heavy equipment, but was countermanded by Markov when the move was already underway, leading to disorganization and loss of communications as the columns came under fire as dawn approached. Attacking to the northeast at Markov's command the 416th and 524th crossed the highway but could not hold the gap against German counterattacks. However, they successfully escaped to the north, while Kopyak was lightly wounded and returned to the staging area.

Markov now decided the only option for his remaining troops was to infiltrate through the German lines in small groups. Kopyak again chose to do so to the southeast, where he assessed those lines were thinnest. On the night of July 23/24 he organized his men accordingly near the village of Ugli. His own detachment cleared the German lines near Lake Dvinye after an engagement near Novokhovansk Station. The divisional banner and documents were saved, along with many wounded. Another detachment led by regimental commissar Ivan Petrovich Belyaev failed to break out and began operating as a partisan unit, eventually growing to the size of a brigade. It eventually crossed to rejoin 22nd Army on October 12. Belyaev would be promoted to the rank of major general and commanded the 270th Rifle Division. Less than 33 percent of the division's personnel managed to escape.

Meanwhile, on July 21 General Yershakov had been ordered to tie down German forces with local attacks beginning the next day. On July 24, Timoshenko reported the liberation of Velikiye Luki, with the attackers taking up defensive positions along the Lovat River to the north and south. At 2000 on July 23 Yershakov effectively admitted that only remnants of 51st Corps had been able to break out; it had lost its headquarters as well as the bulk of the 98th and 112th Divisions. The 170th was reported as fighting along a line from Stankovo to Lake Udrai with one group while a second group remained in encirclement and was attempting to break out. This division had been attacking to the southwest from the Kozhemiachkino area in and effort to assist its corps-mates to escape. On July 26 the 170th moved to the Dokuhino area, where it absorbed the remnants of the 98th and 112th Divisions; Kopyak remained in command of what was referred to as the 112th Rifle Regiment. The following day Yershakov reorganized his Army to defend along the Lovat through Velikiye Luki to Lake Dvina, which was 45km to the southeast. He was directed to hold the city "at all cost". German 9th Army now took up the front south of the city from LVII Motorized but made no immediate effort to retake it.

=== Second Battle of Velikiye Luki ===
Late on August 3, Western Front reported that the 170th, now back under 62nd Rifle Corps, had repelled an attack by a regiment of German infantry. A further report on August 7 stated that the positions of 22nd Army remained unchanged, with limited artillery exchanges and reconnaissance by both sides. Western Front first reported at 2000 hours on August 19 about the possibility of a German counterstroke on Velikiye Luki, but also stated that 22nd Army was fortifying its positions. By August 21 the Army was fighting for its existence as 3rd Panzer Group advanced on Toropets. By August 28 the defenses of Western Front's right wing had collapsed and the commander of German XXXX Motorized Corps announced that he had captured 34,000 men and 300 guns at and southeast of Velikiye Luki, about half the strength of 22nd Army. The 170th was reduced to 300 troops with no commander and no equipment. However, the remnants of the 112th had previously been withdrawn for reorganization, and Western Front's headquarters was informed by the commander of 29th Army that Maj. Gen. M. F. Gavrilov was in temporary command of the division.

== 112th Motor Rifle Division ==
On September 8, General Yershakov, who had finally escaped to his Army's front lines, produced an after-action report on its operations during August 21-25. In it he stated that on the morning of August 22, "Two battalions of a newly-formed regiment of the 112th RD were dispatched; one to the Vtorinovo region to defend the approaches to Kun'ia and the other to the Vishenka region to protect the axis to the northeast." In a further report by Yershakov's headquarters at 2000 hours on August 28 the division was stated as "occupying defenses along the Petrovskoe and Davydovo line" with the 214th Rifle Division.

On September 1 the division was officially reorganized as a motor rifle division with the following order of battle:

- 385th Motor Rifle Regiment
- 416th Motor Rifle Regiment
- 524th Motor Rifle Regiment
- 436th Artillery Regiment
- 449th Howitzer Artillery Regiment
- 2nd Tank Battalion
- 5th Tank Battalion
- 38th Motor Transport Company
- 74th Field Postal Station

The remaining subunits retained their previous numbering, but several were not included, most importantly the 156th Antitank Battalion. Colonel Kopyak resumed his command. This conversion proved abortive under the circumstances, and on September 28 the division was re-re-designated as the 112th Rifle, now as part of 16th Army of Western Front. It returned to its original order of battle, with Kopyak still in command, and had been restored to a strength of 10,091 officers and men, armed with 226 machine guns, 38 artillery pieces and mortars, seven antiaircraft guns and nine antitank guns.

== Operation Typhoon ==
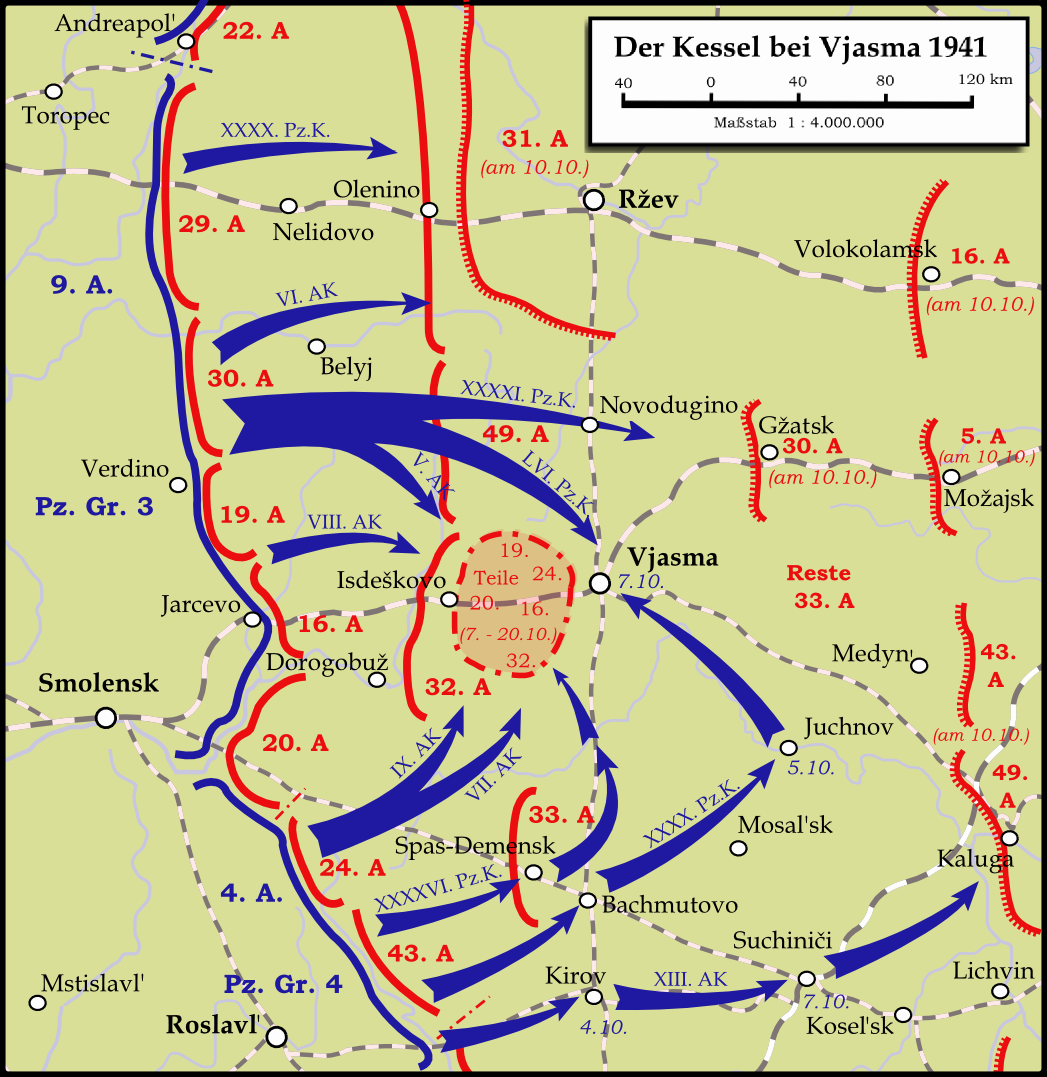
Operation Typhoon (northern sector). Note initial position of 16th Army.

16th Army was under command of Lt. Gen. K. K. Rokossovskii, who had presented a plan of defense on September 27 to the new commander of Western Front, Col. Gen. I. S. Konev, in anticipation of a new German offensive against Moscow. The former had given considerable thought to German methods of breaking through a defense and anticipated that his troops could be forced to make a fighting withdrawal. Konev overruled this, stating:

Your plan doesn't reflect the tasks of a tenacious defense; on the contrary, the staged withdrawal from line to line foreseen by the plan gives indications of only a mobile defense. The withdrawal of the 112th Rifle Division on the Vop' River will expose the flank of the 50th Rifle Division...
I order:
1. Conduct a tenacious defense of the present line on the Vop' River... Fight stubbornly. Eliminate any thought of a mobile defense...

Rokossovskii was to revise his plan and resubmit it. In the event, the German offensive would begin on this sector at dawn on October 2, and Konev would soon be ordering his armies to withdraw.

The attack began with air strikes and artillery bombardments, making frequent use of smoke to create confusion about the chosen breakthrough sectors. Rokossovskii's headquarters reported:

1. At 7.00 2.10 the enemy initiated a hurricane of artillery and mortar fire on the sector Kholm (4 kilometres north of Yartsevo), Kudinovo, Pomogi. The fire was less intense on the rest of the front.
2. Our artillery quickly answered with counter-fire according to the previously developed plan. As a result of the entire power of our artillery fire, the enemy's attack has been disrupted, and his fire has been silenced.

The counter-battery fire came from the guns and mortars of the 112th, 108th, and 38th Rifle Divisions, plus 19th Army's 50th Division. While the attack was indeed disrupted, it was in fact only a feint by the 255th Infantry Division, and most of the shells fell on empty ground. The true attack came unexpectedly at the boundary between the 19th and 30th Armies farther north.

As chaos unfolded to its north and south the sector of 16th Army remained relatively calm, with light casualties. At 1220 hours on October 3 Rokossovskii reported an artillery preparation at 0830, followed by an attack on the 112th and 108th that was driven off. Further details were signaled the next day which stated, "on the sector of the 112th Rifle Division the enemy launched frenzied attacks with up to two infantry regiments, which were repulsed. Our losses: 4 killed and 10 wounded. Captured equipment: 2 mortars, 1 antitank gun, 10 rifles, and 1,500 cartridges." At OKH headquarters the chief of staff, Col. Gen. F. Halder, was complaining in his diary about the unauthorized and costly attack by the 255th Infantry, which he blamed on the ambition of the commander of XXVII Army Corps, Gen. A. Wäger. By the morning of October 3 Konev was finally beginning to grasp the true situation, as by now reconnaissance flights were reporting a German column 20km behind the former front line, with its head 22km farther on. He issued orders for a counterattack, but the main counterattack force, under Lt. Gen. I. V. Boldin, was 45-55km from the breakthrough sector.

By the end of October 5 the 7th Panzer Division had seized a bridgehead over the Dniepr River just 40km southwest of Vyazma while the 10th Panzer Division was 45-50km from the same objective. Time was running out and at 0750 hours on October 6 the STAVKA finally sent retreat orders to the Armies by airplane. The 112th had been transferred to 20th Army as Rokossovskii's 16th Army headquarters was moving back to take command of a new Army near Vyazma itself. General Yershakov was now leading 20th Army and issued his directives as Order 71/op on the same day. Kopyak's men were to fall back along the Smolensk–Vyazma highway to take up a line from Yakovlevo to Stavkovo State Farm, some 20km south of the highway; he was to make his command post at Izdeshkovo. He was to link up with 19th Army at Kasnia Station–Yakovlevo–Prisele. Yershakov attempted to regulate the movement as best as possible:

... 8. All division commanders when planning the withdrawal must first anticipate the withdrawal of the artillery.
9. During the withdrawal of the covering units, all road structures, telephone and telegraph lines and similar objects... are to be destroyed.
10. Division and unit commanders are to arrange through local organs of authority and by administrative means the driving of cattle from the areas abandoned by the troops. All agricultural reserves from local resources, which cannot be evacuated, are to be destroyed.

For an army in contact with the enemy and about to be deeply encircled such directions were simply unrealistic. The new line of defense was designated as another section of the Dniepr some 50-55km to the rear. Konev failed to coordinate with Reserve Front to protect the junction of its 24th Army and his 20th. The 112th was intended to control the highway as the rear guard by holding a 26km wide sector straddling it.

Already at 1920 hours on October 6, Konev was adjusting his orders for the withdrawal, directing Yershakov to pull back overnight to a line from Grigorevo to Krasnoe. German forces detected the withdrawal and immediately set out to pursue, but were held up by rearguards, plus minefields near Yartsevo. However, 19th Army, which was farther east to begin with, pulled back at a faster pace leaving the 20th in a difficult position as German troops reached the highway, which it was using, forcing it to shift to the south. The back roads and the old Smolensk highway were jammed with rear-area transport of 24th Army. However, the German pursuit lessened as XXVII Corps was more interested in pressing east along the highway. Far to the rear, on the morning of October 7 the panzer groups linked up just west of Vyazma, encircling four Soviet armies. At this time the 112th, 129th, and 144th Rifle Divisions were on a line from Chernovo to Usadishchi to Krasnoe to Kholmovaya.

According to Western Front's operational summary issued at 2000 hours on October 8 no report had been received from 20th Army during the day. Radio communications were intermittent throughout the Front, and a liaison officer sent to Yershakov had not returned. At 1745 several additional officers had been sent by U-2 aircraft with orders to speed up the withdrawal to Vyazma to take up a line from Shimonovo to Ugriumovo Station, 55km east of the city. In case German forces prevented this he was to fall back to a line south of Gzhatsk. That this would require moving at a pace of some 70km per day was overlooked, as was the fact that the encirclement had been completed. Only the 112th, with a higher complement of trucks from its recent motorized incarnation, had any possibility of moving so fast. As desperation set in several headquarters began broadcasting in the clear; these messages were intercepted by German intelligence and gave away plans to break out in certain places.

Sometime between 1700 and 1900 the headquarters of 24th Army received an order from Yershakov that it was being subordinated to 20th Army in order to organize a breakout. His plan was to maintain an all-round defense as 20th Army broke out across a line from Vyazma to Volosta to Piatnitsa [20km in width]. By now discipline was breaking down, making any organized effort across such a wide front impossible. In addition, all three places were now firmly in German hands. Army Gen. G. K. Zhukov, the new commander of Reserve Front, now ordered all trapped forces: "In the course of 10 and 11 October, breach the enemy's line and at whatever cost escape the encirclement..." 20th and 24th Armies were to penetrate to the southeast, despite Konev's earlier orders to do so to the southwest. A radio link with Yershakov had been briefly established, over which he reported he planned to break out south of Vyazma.

By October 10 Army Group Center was becoming anxious to destroy the encircled armies so as to continue the advance on Moscow as the weather was already deteriorating. It was already too late for the 112th, which was officially written off on this date. Over the next week individuals, small and larger groups managed to reach friendly lines. This included Colonel Kopyak, who would be made commander of the 3rd formation of the 140th Rifle Division on January 29, 1942. Promoted to the rank of major general on May 3 he went missing, presumed killed in action, when his division was encircled and destroyed near Millerovo in early August.

== 2nd Formation ==
A new division, originally designated as the 445th, was formed at Tatarsk in the Siberian Military District in accordance with a decree dated December 3. On January 13, 1942, it was renumbered as the 287th, before being finally redesignated as the new 112th on January 20. Col. Ivan Petrovich Sologub would be appointed to command on February 18. Once formed its order of battle was very similar to that of the 1st formation:

- 385th Rifle Regiment
- 416th Rifle Regiment
- 524th Rifle Regiment
- 436th Artillery Regiment
- 156th Antitank Battalion
- 196th Reconnaissance Company
- 159th Sapper Battalion
- 272nd Signal Battalion (later 272nd, 17th Signal Companies)
- 198th Medical/Sanitation Battalion
- 225th Chemical Defense (Anti-gas) Platoon
- 33rd Motor Transport Battalion
- 148th Motorized Field Bakery
- 897th Divisional Veterinary Hospital (later 107th)
- 1692nd Field Postal Station
- 1062nd Field Office of the State Bank

In a report in April the personnel of the division were reported as mostly Siberian Russian of the year group 1923 (19 year olds) but with many penal troops. By this time it had been moved west to the Moscow Military District, and in May it was assigned to the 1st Reserve Army in the Reserve of the Supreme High Command. By this time it was becoming clear that the main German effort in the summer of 1942 would come in the south, although the STAVKA continued to suspect a renewed drive on Moscow from this direction, so the eight reserve armies were positioned appropriately.

== Battle of Stalingrad ==
On July 10 the STAVKA reorganized its forces in the Stalingrad region. Stalingrad Front was created under command of Marshal Timoshenko, with three Armies, the 62nd, 63rd, and 64th. The latter was the previous 1st Reserve, with six divisions including the 112th, under command of Lt. Gen. V. I. Chuikov. The division entered the active army on July 12, and by July 21 Chuikov had deployed his Army south of the Chir River, with the 112th along the river at the junction of the 64th and 62nd Armies. The commander of German 6th Army, Gen. F. Paulus, planned to penetrate the Red Army's defenses guarding the great bend of the Don River with tank "wedges", reach the river as quickly as possible, then roll up the lines on the west bank from the flanks, preventing any withdrawal across the river. This was to be led by the three divisions of XIV Panzer Corps.

=== Battle of Kalach ===
The offensive began on July 22, chiefly against 62nd Army, and after two days that force was in considerable difficulty, with about one-third of it loosely encircled. However, on July 25 the panzers encountered difficulties, partly due to supply shortages, combined with stiffening resistance from 64th Army which was preventing any crossing of the Chir at Nizhne-Chirskaya, blocking the route to Kalach. Despite some success against the 229th and 214th Rifle Divisions, the two German pincers remained 35km apart. After the defenses of the former were broken through, Chuikov managed to put together a new defensive line with elements of the 112th and the 66th Naval Rifle Brigade. By the end of July 28 a German bridgehead over the Chir was still just 3km deep. By the end of the month it was clear the Paulus' effort to destroy all Soviet forces west of the Don had failed, erasing any possibility of capturing Stalingrad "off the march".

=== Defense of Stalingrad ===
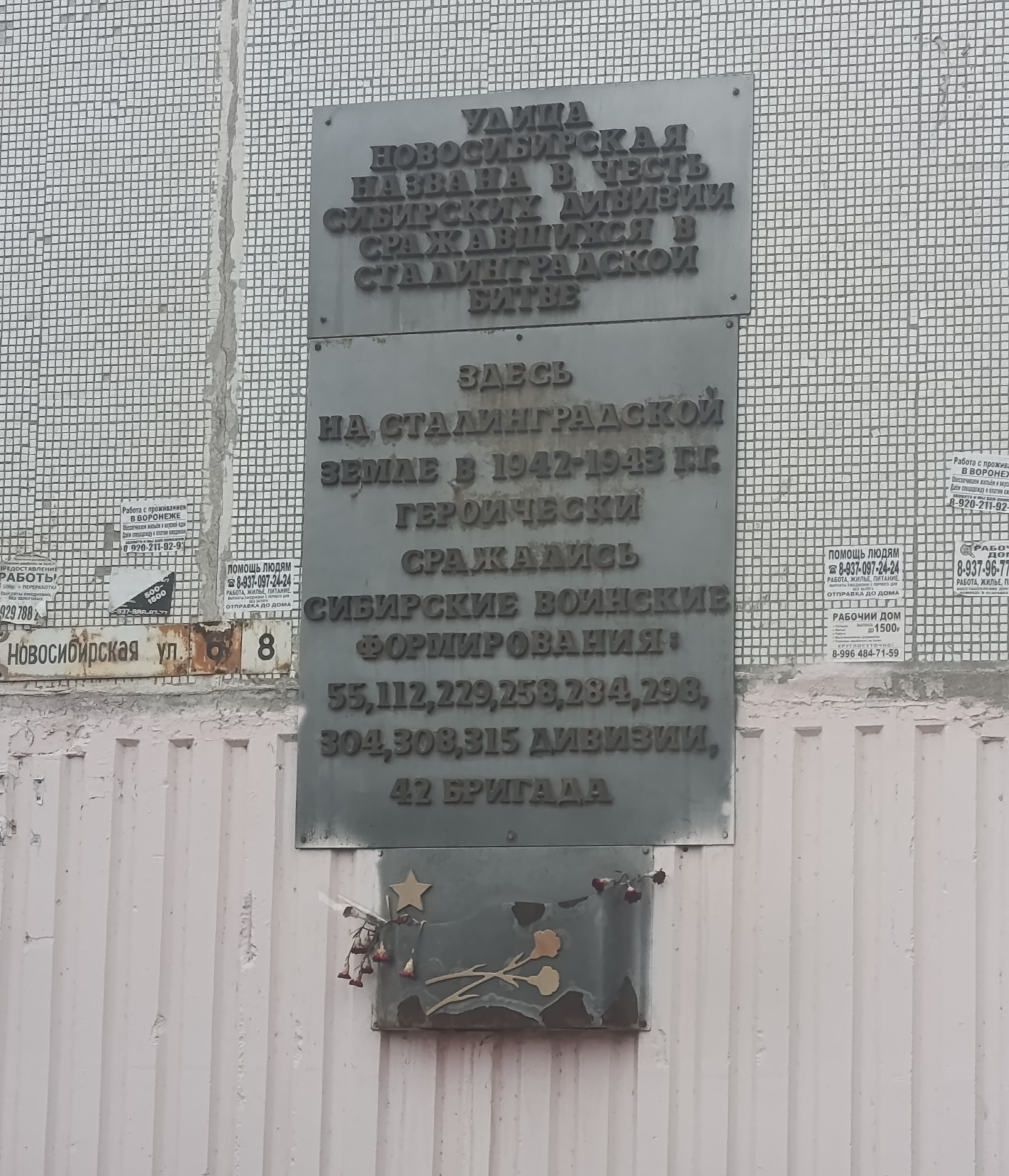
Memorial to Siberian units that fought at Stalingrad. Novosibirskaya Street in Volgograd, 2026.

On August 3 the division was transferred to 62nd Army, the same day that Lt. Gen. A. I. Lopatin took command of that Army. Southeastern Front was formed two days later, with Col. Gen. A. I. Yeryomenko taking command of it on August 7. Late that day the Red Army General Staff's operational summary stated, in part:

112th RD, under pressure of a numerically superior enemy attacking toward Chir Station, was fighting intensely and withdrawing to the Pogodinskii-Hill 133.1-Motor Tractor Factory line with its right wing units. The left wing units of the division were holding on to the Rychkovskii region [10km east of Chir Station].

Two days later the division, supported by 27 tanks of the 121st Tank Brigade, recaptured the Rychkovskii and Samodurovka areas and took up a defense of the bridgehead fortifications near the former place. In this fighting Colonel Sologub was mortally wounded, dying the next day. He was replaced by one of his subordinates, Lt. Col. Ivan Efimovich Ermolkin, who would be promoted to full colonel on August 31.

During August 9–12 Yeryomenko began planning for the defense of Stalingrad itself. The "intact" portion of 62nd Army (112th, 131st, and 399th Rifle Divisions, 28th Tank Corps, 20th Motorized Brigade, 115th Fortified Region) was to defend the Don while also assisting the escape of the troops still trapped to the west. The 112th, with the 158th and 160th Artillery/MG Battalions, dug in on a line from Cherkasov to Logovskii. In addition to defensive missions Yeryomenko intended to disrupt Paulus' plans through coordinated counterattacks on August 19–20: "62nd Army will force the Don in the Vertiachii and Peskovatka sectors on the night of 19–20 August with two rifle divisions, reinforced by tank brigades, and reach the Golubaia River in the Hill 197 and Malonabatovskii sector [west of the Don] by attacking toward the north and northwest where it will dig in." In the event it was made moot by the renewed German advance on August 21. In a report the previous day 62nd Army stated that while the 112th had been more successful than many in withdrawing over the Don, it had still been reduced to 3,376 men.

Overnight on August 20/21 6th Army's assault force took up positions across from Vertiachii. The opposed crossings the next day were difficult but successful, and by 1630 hours a pontoon bridge was in place at Lutchenskii. All this was considerably north of the 112th's sector. At dawn on August 23 the Soviet defense collapsed and XIV Panzer Corps began a headlong advance across the unbroken steppe toward the north end of Stalingrad. The corridor driven by the panzers to the Volga was narrow and appeared vulnerable to counterattack. Lopatin was ordered to strike toward Vertiachii, in cooperation with 4th Tank Army, on August 24, but this failed, while overnight two regiments of the 71st Infantry Division got over the Don just north of Kalach, forcing the 131st and 399th to begin to fall back 5–8km, although Yeryomenko forbade a full withdrawal to the Rossoshka River. This finally took place by August 31, but by late on that day the LI Army Corps penetrated the defense of this line, leaving a large part of both 64th and 62nd Armies, including the 112th, partly encircled west of the Chervlennaya River. At 2000 on September 1 Yeryomenko finally authorized a withdrawal by the two Armies to the "Novaia Nadezhda, Peschanka, and Ivanovka line as rapidly as possible." Paulus had an opportunity to cut off this withdrawal with XIV Panzer, but delayed until the force had pulled back to the city's defenses.

=== Into the suburbs ===
By late September 2 the 112th had taken up its new positions, which were described as follows:

Relying on prepared positions [part of position "S" of Stalingrad's defensive lines], occupy a defense in the vicinity of Hill 156.1, the barn at Gumrak, Kammenyi Buerak, and Uvarovka to prevent an enemy penetration toward Aleksandrovka and Opytnaia Station and prepare counterattacks toward Orlovka and Talovoi.

It would man this with the assistance of the 115th Fortified Region plus the 157th and 158th Artillery MG Battalions. While Lopatin's dispositions seemed sound on paper it held significant weaknesses, particularly on his left wing. While the 112th, with the 2nd and 23rd Tank Corps, anchored the Army's right and center in continuous defenses from the Volga at Rynok, west to Orlovka, and south to the hospital, from where the defenses became sketchier. LI Corps was determined to reach the city by the most direct route, capturing Gumrak Station and Gorodishche before heading to Mamayev Kurgan and Railroad Station No. 1. It was opposed by the 112th, 399th, and 196th Rifle Divisions, two rifle and two tank brigades, and a portion of 244th Rifle Division that was north of the Tsaritsa River.

LI Corps began its attack at dawn on September 3 with small battlegroups of 71st and 295th Infantry Divisions in the lead. 23rd Tanks and 399th Rifle were pushed east toward Konnaia Station, while most of Gumrak Station was taken from the 112th and the 2nd Tanks. Ermolkin's troops largely faced the 71st's 211th and 194th Regiments, and the arrival of the reinforcing 87th Rifle Division did little to improve the situation. At the same time the 71st's right wing broke the defense of the 196th and took Talovoi, Opytnaia Station, and Ezhovka, causing heavy casualties before a combined counterattack by the 112th, 196th, and 87th managed to stop the attack short of the hospital. The latter two divisions were so decimated by now that they would disappear from 62nd Army's order of battle within days. On September 4 the 295th finished clearing the last elements of the 112th, a total of 285 riflemen, from Gumrak airfield and Station. Despite these successes, 6th Army was facing increasing pressure from 1st Guards Army against the Kotluban corridor that linked its forces near the city with the Don, and LI Corps' attack into Stalingrad was postponed for two days.

By the end of September 5 the 112th and 399th, reinforced by the 27th and 99th Tank Brigades, built a defense from Konnaia Station southward to Stalingradskii, facing the 295th Infantry. Two days later, Paulus, reassured about the situation at Kotluban, ordered LI Corps to capture downtown Stalingrad and push through to the Volga. Attacking abreast at dawn, the 295th and 389th Infantry Divisions, supported by 30-40 StuG III assault guns and groups of 40-50 Ju 87 dive bombers, pushed due east across the steppeland toward the bluffs that overlooked the city. The 112nd, 399th, and remnants of the 87th, with their supporting tanks, were forced to steadily give ground. In intense fighting the 399th and 189th Tank Brigade dug in on the western fringes of Aleksandrovka and Gorodishche, as the 112th, with the nearly tankless remnants of the 27th and 99th Brigades, also dug in along the rail line south of Aleksandrovka. By evening, Ermolkin had just 300 "bayonets" (riflemen and sappers) remaining, while the 399th was in worse shape. He received one battalion of the 124th Rifle Brigade as reinforcements.

The 295th and 71st Infantry renewed their attacks on the morning of September 8, pushing eastward toward Gorodishche and Razgulaevka Station along the Gumrak–Stalingrad line. The 295th forced the 112th and 399th, with their few supporting tanks, back into Gorodishche, Aleksandrovka, and across the rail line. Lopatin, in desperation, reinforced the sector with the 38th Motorized Rifle Brigade and the 6th Tank Brigade. The offensive continued the next day and the 295th's 516th Regiment took the western section of Aleksandrovka from the 112th, with Ermolkin now reporting just 82 "bayonets" remaining. The commander of LI Corps, Gen. W. K. von Seydlitz-Kurzbach, reported that while the defenders had suffered high losses, he also stated that "our own were not inconsequential." During the evening, deciding Lopatin was not up to the job, Stalin relieved him in favor of Chuikov, currently deputy commander of 64th Army.

Overnight on September 9/10 the XXXXVIII Panzer Corps broke through to the Volga at Kuporosnoe, south of the city, which was now cut off by land. During the day it advanced from the south in an effort to link up with LI Corps. The 295th Infantry pushed eastward on a sector form Gorodishche to south of Razgulaevka Station, taking on the 38th Motorized and elements of the 112th east and southeast of the latter place. Under this pressure the 112th and 399th were suffering extreme attrition, and Chuikov had already ordered them to withdraw to take up new positions along the heights west of the city, with the 112th on the hills 1.5km southwest of the city center. Late in the day its positions were reported as "defending the Marker 114.3 and Marker +0.8 line." As of September 11 it recorded a total of 2,297 personnel on strength, the vast majority in the artillery and other supporting arms. By comparison, the 399th reported just 565.

=== Battle for the city ===
During September 12 the fighting for the suburbs reached a climax. LI Corps deployed its three divisions abreast from Gorodishche south to the Tsaritsa and pushed slowly eastward against the depleted defenders, including units of the 112th, toward Mamayev Kurgan and the city center. Chuikov had cobbled together a new reserve, made up of the remnants of the 399th, the main part of the 112th in Krasny Oktyabr village, plus several other units. By nightfall, German forces had effectively cleared the suburbs, and the battle for the city began the next day. This began with intense artillery fire and heavy air strikes, to which 62nd Army replied with artillery and Katyusha fire of its own from the left bank of the Volga. Desperate resistance limited German advances to several hundred metres, but Chuikov's communications were disrupted and he had little idea of the picture on the ground. The 295th Infantry took the region east of the hospital from the 112th, forcing it farther back to the heights and costing it considerable losses. By dusk the 518th Infantry Regiment had gained up to 1.5km toward Mamayev Kurgan and Hill 98.9.

On September 14 two regiments of the 71st Infantry led by a battalion of tanks broke through the 42nd Rifle Brigade east of the hospital and pushed to the southwest toward Hill 112.5. The 194th Regiment seized Railroad Station No. 1 at about noon. This advance took Chuikov by surprise, forcing his to commit the remaining tanks of 6th Tank Brigade into the city center. The infiltrating German troops soon reached within 800m of his command post, leading to house-to-house fighting that also involved the 10th NKVD Rifle Division, its attached militia, and security troops from the Army headquarters. In the chaos some German infantry reached the Volga. The Army chief of staff, Maj. Gen. N. I. Krylov, scraped up a combined force of tank and infantry to slow the advance of the 194th. The Army's evening report stated, in part:

112th RD, one battalion of 124th RB, 10 tanks (KVs), and 133rd TB [Group Krylov] have been thrown into the region of the breakthrough.
13th Gds. RD began crossing to the western bank of the Volga River at 2000 hours on 14 September.

It was clear to Chuikov that his resistance would collapse without significant reinforcements, and the arrival of the 13th Guards would prove crucial.

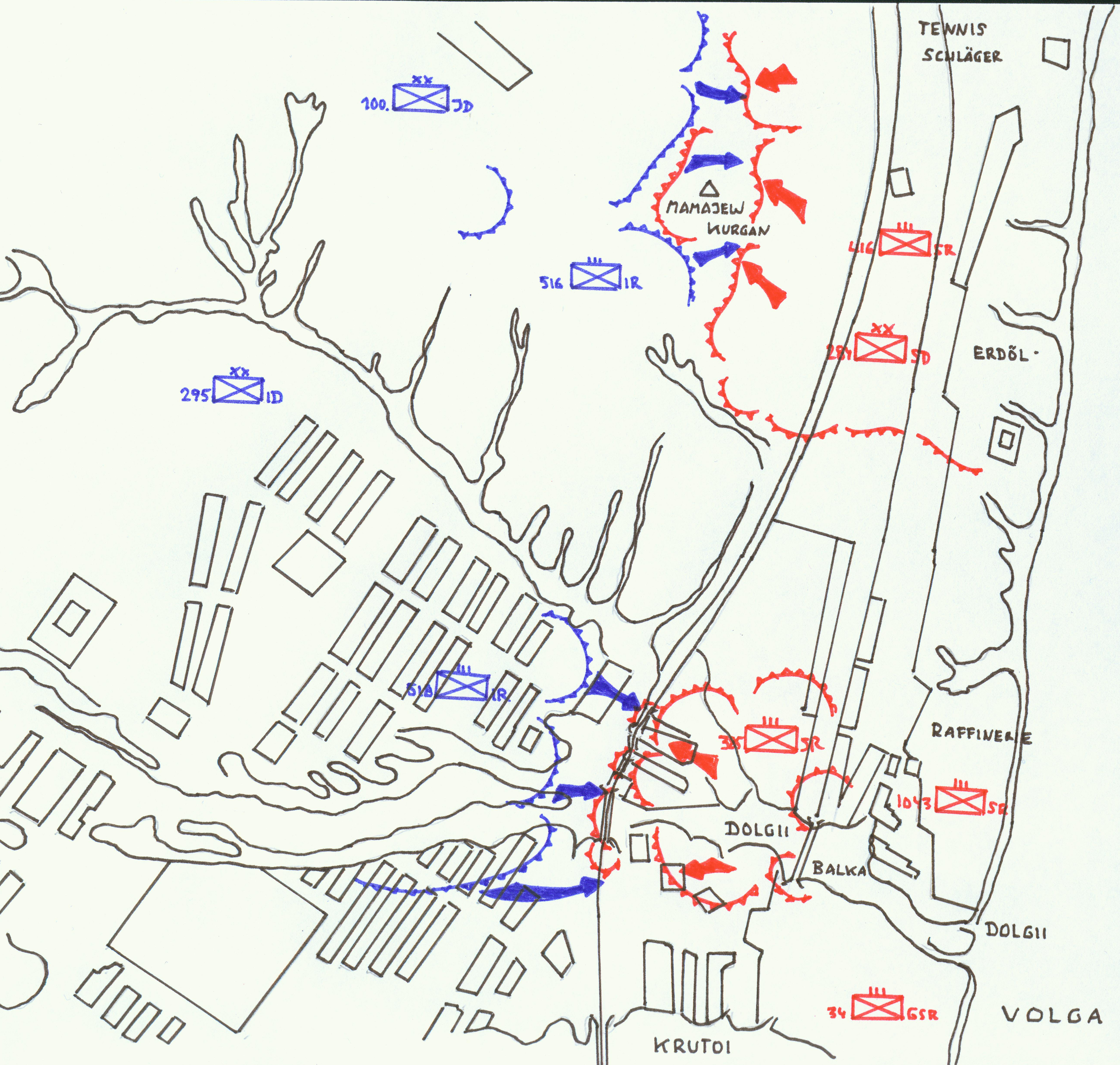
Mamayev Kurgan (north), Dolgii and Krutoi ravines (south). Note positions of 416th and 385th Regiments.

Two battalions of the 34th Guards Rifle Regiment arrived to reinforce the 269th NKVD Regiment on Mamayev Kurgan on September 15, allowing the latter to edge northward to back up the 38th and 9th Motorized Rifle Brigades at Hill 126.3. Not long after, the remnants of Group Krylov, largely the 1st and 2nd Battalions of 416th Rifle Regiment, joined the battle for Mamayev Kurgan. The next day at 1500 hours the regiment, along with one battalion of Guardsmen, took the crest of the hill from the 518th Infantry Regiment. This was the start of a prolonged, see-saw struggle for this feature, as a German counterattack retook it later in the afternoon. As the best observation point in the city, possession of the crest was vital to both sides. In the Army's midnight report, in addition to the 416th, the 524th Regiment was stated as being in "the western edge of the woods (west of marker 35.8)", with the 385th at "Hill 98.9 and the western edge of the woods (Krasnyi Oktiabr')". As the battle continued on September 17 the 416th and the 34th Guards sparred with the 518th Regiment for the crestline, while the 385th and 524th defended the Dolgii and Krutoi ravines from the 194th Infantry. Late in the day Chuikov communicated to Yeryomenko that the 112th and 13th Guards had captured the southwestern slopes of Mamayev Kurgan, while pleading for additional reinforcements. The 137th Tank Brigade, consisting of 15 T-60s, had been brought over by the Volga Military Flotilla the night before and was moving to back up the two divisions on the hill.

This battle heated up again on September 19. The previous day Southeastern Front had ordered Chuikov to prepare for a major counterattack to support 1st Guards Army near Kotluban, with the 112th specifically to restore its positions overnight. The 385th and 524th Regiments were then to reach the railway bridges over the Dolgii and Krutoi ravines. The attack began at noon, but was generally halted in its tracks. The two regiments were reported as having retaken the eastern outskirts of Polotnoe while also holding the bridge over the Krutoi along Artyomovskaya Street, with the aid of the leading two battalions of the arriving 95th Rifle Division. Chuikov ordered his commanders to continue on September 20, although he did not foresee any great chance of success. The 516th Infantry Regiment again attacked the crest line of Mamayev Kurgan, where the 416th and 385th Regiments had been reinforced by 95th Rifle's 90th and 161st Rifle Regiments. As the German position deteriorated Seydlitz-Kurzbach was forced to order the 26th Grenadier Regiment of 24th Panzer Division forward to reinforce the 516th. Over the following days the panzer troops would entirely relieve the 295th Infantry. Meanwhile, the 524th Regiment and part of the 385th held off the attacks of the 517th Infantry along the rail line south of the Dolgii.

Chuikov tried to keep his counteroffensive on track during September 21. The 524th and 385th managed to penetrate the German defenses and reached an area 300m north of Kolodeznaya Street to gain the upper reaches of the Dolgii. They were then halted by heavy fire, despite the support of the 39th Guards Regiment on their left. Overnight the lead regiment of the 284th Rifle Division crossed the Volga and concentrated from the Krasny Oktyabr to east of Mamayev Kurgan to finally give 62nd Army a reserve. The 516th and 518th Infantry Regiments renewed their attack against the 112th and 95th and middle part of the Dolgii on September 22 in an effort to break the stalemate on Mamayev Kurgan; they would be followed by the 517th the next day. After a heavy air and artillery preparation beginning at 0500 hours which made little impact the ground attack began at 0620. The Red Army troops defended

[f]rom barricaded houses and numerous earth bunkers... offered very tough resistance with mortars, artillery, and rocket launchers, in part from the east shore of the Volga, not to mention violent counterthrusts. In costly combat with flamethrowers and concentrated charges, well-supported by assault guns and pioneers, the infantrymen gained ground but their low strengths prevented a large gain of ground.

Despite this resistance the lines of the 385th and 524th were pierced along the rail line south of the Dolgii. German troops drove ahead to reach the Volga at several points "after difficult fighting." It was up to the remaining regiments of the 284th to drive the lead battlegroups of the 517th Infantry back from their tenuous footholds. During the following days, as Chuikov persisted in his attacks, LI Corps focused on the downtown core, where 13th Guards had already been reduced to about 1,000 "bayonets" in a week of fighting. On September 23 the 284th regained most of the ground that had been lost by the 112th along the Dolgii. The next day the 112th was reported as:

... defending along the southeastern slopes of Hill 102.0 [Mamayev Kurgan]. The 385th RR of the division was defending the northern bank of the Dolgii Ravine and Artilleriiskaia Street line, and 524th RR the southern bank of the Dolgii Ravine and, further, from Artilleriiskaia Street to the bank of the Volga River.

By September 26 the division, with 2,558 men remaining, took up "a second defensive line along the line of Vishnevaia Balka," which was west of the Krasny Oktyabr village. It was reinforced with a company of 50mm mortars and the 186th Antitank Regiment. Chuikov gave Ermolkin detailed orders on how he was to dispose his forces, based on the lessons learned so far in the street fighting. Meanwhile, Paulus prepared to assault the factory district on September 27.

=== Into the Factory District ===
62nd Army's assault groups began counterattacking at 0600 after a one-hour bombardment using 220 guns and mortars. Before any real gains were made the Luftwaffe appeared in strength at 0800. The 95th Division's strongpoint at the crest of Mamayev Kurgan was destroyed, and at 1030 the combined infantry of the 389th, 24th Panzer, and 100th Jäger Divisions began a coordinated attack against the hill, the Orlovka salient, and the Krasny Oktyabr village. In its evening report Chuikov's headquarters, which had also been under fire, stated in part:

112th RD was fighting along the Vishnevaia Balka and the grove of trees north of Shakhtinskaia [Shakhtinsk] Street and Narodnaia Street line with two regiments [416th and 385th]. One regiment [524th] of this division has been almost completely destroyed by the enemy.
The Army's units suffered heavy losses from enemy fire and aircraft... 112th RD's 416th and 524th RRs have about 300 men.

24th Panzer had destroyed a group of riflemen of the 385th defending south of Mamayev Kurgan while moving north into and through the western part of Krasny Oktyabr village, where it fought a sharp action with another group of the 385th, backed by several T-34s. Elements of the division were now isolated along and west of Vishnevaia Balka. According to his memoirs, Chuikov admitted to himself, "One more battle like that and we'll be in the Volga."

To address the situation he ordered the 193rd Rifle Division commander, Maj. Gen. F. N. Smekhotvorov, to ferry his 883rd and 895th Rifle Regiments across the river overnight to reinforce Ermolin's defenses on the western edge of Krasny Oktyabr and Barrikady villages. LI Corps returned to its advance on the morning of September 28, but with less success. The 895th Regiment repelled an attack in the Barrikady village by a battalion of infantry and eight tanks, while the 112th managed to defend its remaining positions during the morning with the help of the remnants of the 9th and 38th Motorized Brigades. A new effort by 24th Panzer began at noon, and now the 416th Regiment was overrun as the panzers advance some 1000m on the west edge of the lower Barrikady village; what remained of the 524th was pushed back to the upper village. By now 24th Panzer was highly overextended, especially with the 193rd Division on its flank. In his 1930 orders, Chuikov made the 112th his reserve, while also directing Ermolin to improve his defenses in the Barrikady village. In order to streamline the higher command situation, Southeastern Front was abolished and 62nd Army was subordinated to Stalingrad Front, under Yeryomenko.

September 29 saw the few remaining men of the 524th defending the northwest edge of the upper Barrikady village, while Battlegroup Winterfeld of the 24th Panzer advanced several hundred metres to the north, taking the rest of the upper Barrikady village from the 416th and the 895th Regiments; these now dug in to protect the southern approaches to the Silikat works. A wedge had been forced between the two rifle divisions. The remainder of the 24th was forced to cover its extended right flank and it suffered 141 casualties, its highest daily total to date. Its tank strength was also dwindling. The next day the 416th and 524th continued to hold at and to the west of the Silikat, while the 385th defended a wooded area north of Barrikady village. From this point a total of 132 men of the 524th, with a handful of remaining men from 23rd Tank Corps, held a line to the Mokraya Mechetka River. Although further reinforcements were arriving to stabilize 62nd Army's positions, during September 26-30 Stalingrad Front lost 3,767 killed, 10,217 wounded, 878 missing, and 1,311 non-combat deaths. As of October 1 the 112th reported 2,722 personnel on strength.

Among the reinforcements was the refitted 42nd Rifle Brigade, which entered the line between the 416th Regiment and the 193rd's 685th Regiment. Overnight on September 30/October 1 the 351st Rifle Regiment of the 308th Rifle Division also moved into positions south of the 112th and 42nd Brigade. The 39th Guards Rifle Division also crossed and occupied the Krasny Oktyabr factory. During the first days of October 6th Army turned its attention to eliminating the Orlovka salient, which 62nd Army held as the closest point to the forces north of the Kotluban corridor and a potential breakthrough. A detachment of some 250 men of the 112th was among the 6,500 defenders. Late on October 6, Chuikov ordered the breakout of the encircled survivors under cover of a rocket bombardment, some of which took up positions on the division's right flank.

With Paulus distracted by this battle, Chuikov attempted to seize the initiative with a counterattack to retake most of the upper Barrakady village. On the morning of October 1 the reinforced 385th and 416th Regiments, with the 685th Regiment of the 193rd, attempted a strong reconnaissance-in-force to feel out the German defenses and improve positions for a larger effort the next day. In the event, 24th Panzer held its positions without great difficulty. For the main attack the next day Chuikov again placed the 112th in reserve while the 308th employed two regiments; the 193rd also sent two regiments to attack Hill 107.5 from the west. This led to just meagre results, but overnight the 112th was ordered to shift westward toward the Mechetka River "to occupy a line of defense from the railway bridge across the stream about 800 metres south of Hill 75.9, to point 97.7, and then along the gully to the southeast..." LI Corps continued its attack on the factory district on October 3, with two regiments of the 389th Infantry attempting to skirt the west edge of the upper Barrakady village but ran into strong resistance from the 6th Guards Tank Brigade backed by the relocated 112th. The 389th reached its objective at noon at some cost, after which the two Soviet units took up new defensive positions. This opened the way for a successful German attack on the ruins of the Silikat. An advance by 24th Panzer threatened to split the 112th from the 308th, leaving open the possibility of a further advance to the landing stage north of the Krasny Oktyabr factory.

The 389th pushed to the northeast on the morning of October 4 from the gullies southwest of the upper Tractor Factory village, driving back the security outposts of 385th Regiment to the division's main line along Shchelkovskaya Street. The German advance made slow progress before stalling late in the day, but the 385th, and the nearby 42nd Brigade, had their defenses smashed. The Stadium to the east also fell. Chuikov was forced to reorganize again, inserting the newly arrived 37th Guards Rifle Division to shore up the 112th, 42nd Brigade, and 308th Division, which had one regiment encircled and largely destroyed. An overnight report from 62nd Army stated that the 416th Regiment had 97 men remaining, and the 385th had 124. Beginning the next day LI Corps made a series of limited-objective attacks. The 389th, backed by up to 700 air attacks, gained about 400m into the Tractor Factory village against two regiments of 37th Guards, backed by the 385th. The push was halted in large part due to effective fire from the 499th Antitank, 11th Artillery, and 85th Howitzer Regiments. In addition, the 84th Tank Brigade also began to arrive to bolster the defense. In the daily summary the 112th was said to be occupying "defenses along the cemetery–western outskirts of the Tractor Factory village line." The 389th Infantry suspended its operations over the next two days in order to shift forces and straighten its lines.

Yeryomenko now pressed Chuikov to make a further counterattack, but was preempted when the 389th struck again at 1120 hours on October 7 with the support of tanks and assault guns. The 37th Guards' 114th Guards Rifle Regiment was forced back 300m to the east, but two regiments of the 94th Infantry failed to take a crossing over the Mechetka south of the railroad bridge from the 385th Regiment, assisted by accurate Katyusha fire. This regiment, along with the 109th Guards Rifle Regiment, now found itself in a salient north of Dizelnaya Street, while the rest of the 37th Guards blocked the way to the Tractor Factory. Paulus and Seydlitz-Kurzbach now both recognized they would need reinforcements to take this objective, and a lull fell over 6th Army's front. During this period the 79th and 305th Infantry Divisions moved to the city, although the former would not arrive until after Paulus renewed his attacks on October 14.

=== The Tractor Works ===
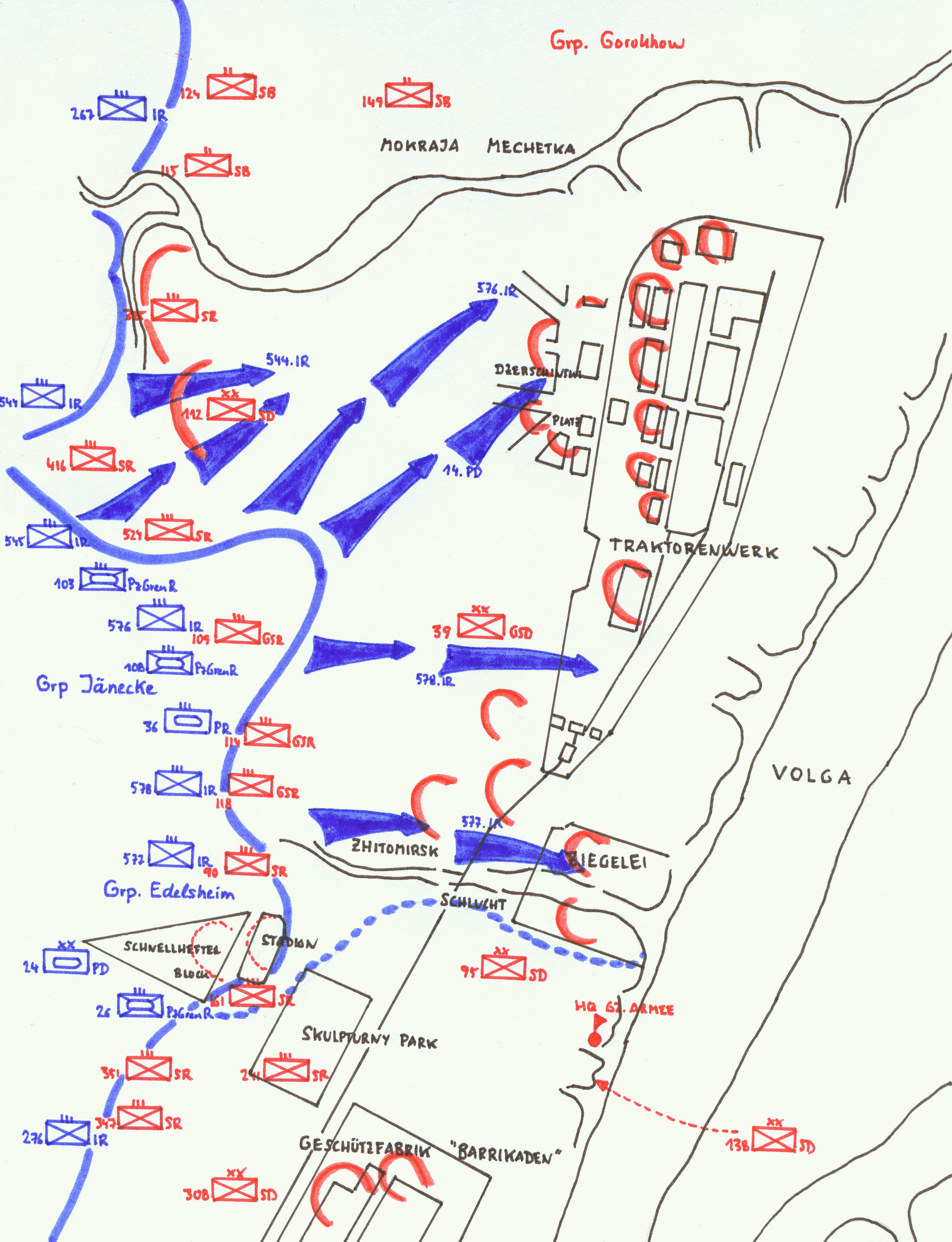
Attack on the Tractor Works, October 14-15. Note positions of the 112th and its regiments.

Chuikov used the lull to reposition his forces. The 95th Division was moved from Mamayev Kurgan to a new sector near the Stadium while also incorporating the 937 survivors of the 42nd Brigade. In addition, Ermolkin's 524th Regiment, which had been sent over the Volga for reforming and refitting, returned to take up a defense along the Mechetka and Kooperativnaya Street to the Stadium; the division had now returned to a strength of some 2,300 men. One regiment of the 39th Guards was deployed to guard the boundary between the 37th Guards and the 95th. By the evening of October 13 Chuikov felt he had created a credible defense for the Tractor Works.

The German attack by the combined arms Group Jänecke began at 0730 hours on October 14 after a powerful artillery preparation of 2.5 hours. This was accompanied by carpet bombing by up to 1,250 aircraft against the northern half of the factory district. The 305th and 14th Panzer Divisions hit the defense at a vulnerable 90 degree angle, pointing toward the center of the Tractor Factory village and the Factory itself. The northern flank of the angle was being held by 109th Guards and the 600 men of the 416th Regiment. The eastern flank was defended by the remainder of the 37th Guards, backed by the 524th Regiment, the 117th Guards Regiment of the 39th Guards, the 90th Regiment of the 95th, and the 84th Tanks. The coordinated attack did great damage to the 37th Guards and its supporting units, overrunning the 109th Guards and the 524th by 1130 hours, encircling and destroying two battalions of the former while cutting through the second-line defense of the 524th and 117th Guards. The headquarters of the Guards division blamed the debacle on the withdrawal of the 524th and the 90th. As the remnants of the 37th Guards retreated to the Factory the 416th Regiment was also encircled and largely destroyed. On the left flank of the assault several battlegroups of the 389th Infantry smashed the defenses of the 385th and part of the 109th Guards along the Mechetka. These conducted a fighting withdrawal to the lower Factory village or across the Mechetka to join Group Gorokhov on the river's north bank. By the end of the day Chuikov's headquarters admitted that the Tractor Factory and Minusinsk had fallen and German forces had reached the Volga. The remnants of the 416th and 524th were also trying to hold out in the lower Factory village and west of the Factory itself. Ermolkin was reduced to as few as 1,000 men, and over October 14 and 15 62nd Army lost no fewer than 10,000.

By the end of October 15 the unencircled elements of the 112th and 37th Guards filtered northward to the Mechetka. The 385th occupied defenses north of the river, while the 416th and 524th defended several buildings deep inside the northern part of the lower Factory village; the latter had only 40 men remaining. They were joined there by battalion groups of the 124th and 149th Rifle Brigades sent southward by Group Gorokhod, which was now isolated from the rest of 62nd Army and under attack by 16th Panzer Division. By October 19 this attack had largely failed, and the position of Group Gorokhod (now referred to as the Northern Group) had stabilized, with the remnants of the 112th incorporated into its defense. This was followed by a lull across the operational front until October 22.

==== Evacuation and rebuilding ====
During this pause Chuikov reorganized his forces once again. Overnight on October 20/21 his most heavily damaged formations were pulled back across the Volga, including Ermolkin's headquarters and all three rifle regiments. The rebuilding process would be lengthy, as even by November 20 the division had only 659 men on strength. Five days earlier Ermolkin had been officially removed from his command after facing a military tribunal for several instances of reporting "false information to the army headquarters about the state of his units, repeatedly seeking permission from the Military Council of the Front and the 62nd Army to withdraw the division headquarters and regimental headquarters to the left bank of the Volga River." He would later serve as deputy commander of the 169th Rifle Division and was killed near Bryansk on September 7, 1943, when the vehicle he was in ran over a mine. He was replaced by Maj. Yakov Danilovich Filonenko, who in turn was replaced on December 31 by Maj. Gen. Porfirii Sergeevich Furt (or Furtenko). This political officer had not previously held a field command during the war.

On the same date the 112th was removed to the Reserve of the Supreme High Command for redeployment. By the start of February, 1943 it was in the Volga Military District as its rebuilding continued. At this time it was reported as having a personnel breakdown of 60 percent Turkmen, 30 percent Russian, and 10 percent Ukrainian, largely from the 1925 - 1927 year groups (16-18 year olds).

== Sevsk-Truschevsk Offensive ==
On February 5 the STAVKA issued a decree to create a new Central Front by February 15 on the basis of Don Front, which had been led by General Rokossovskii during the Stalingrad fighting. The 112th was to be included in this Front, which would also include the 2nd Tank Army. In the event, the problems of redeploying such a large force over long distances in winter forced a postponement of Central Front's offensive until February 25. By this time the division had been assigned to 2nd Tanks. The immediate objective of the attack was the rail line from Bryansk to Konotop. From there it was to continue toward Sevsk and Unecha to cut the Bryansk–Gomel line, before advancing on that place and the Dniepr River nearby. This would amount to covering some 500km in a minimum of 42 days, a highly ambitious goal.

By the time this offensive began the situation to the south was becoming ominous. Army Group South began a counteroffensive against Southwestern Front on February 14, which soon defeated its overextended forces. Rokossovskii struck into the gap between German 2nd Army and 2nd Panzer Army, with the 2nd Tank Army, concentrated at Fatezh, rolled through a screen provided by 13th Army's 132nd Rifle Division toward Dmitriev-Lgovskii. As the 112th had not yet come up, 2nd Tank's other two rifle divisions, the 60th and 194th, began a five-day battle for the defense line between that place and Deriugino. Meanwhile, the 112th, farther south, advanced to the west toward the Svapa River. By the beginning of March the Front had made considerable progress, with Sevsk falling on March 1, Dmitriev-Lgovskii the next day, while the 112th had crossed the Svapa and was moving southwest.

The Front's mission was changed at 2130 hours on March 7. Rather than making a deep strike toward Bryansk and beyond, Rokossovskii was now ordered to regroup toward Oryol, which Bryansk Front was struggling to reach. After concentrating on the Usozha River his 2nd Tank, 65th, and 70th Armies were to push northward toward that place via Lokot. By now the 112th had been transferred to the latter Army, and it was directed to defend along the line Lemeshova–Strekalovka–Skovorodnevo along with the 325th Rifle Division. By the end of March 11 the Oryol offensive had been forced to a halt. Later that month the 112th was assigned to 24th Rifle Corps, which was under direct command of the Front. During April this Corps came under command of 60th Army, which was led by Lt. Gen. I. D. Chernyakhovskii. On April 27 General Furt was removed from his command and put at the disposal of Central Front's Military Council. He would later lead the 4th Rifle Division before being wounded in October 1944, and ended the war as military commandant of Łódź. He was replaced by Col. Pyotr Semyonovich Polyakov. This officer had previously served as chief of staff of the 114th Rifle Brigade and the 27th Guards Rifle Division.

=== Battle of Kursk ===
As of the start of July 24th Corps had the 112th plus the 42nd and 129th Rifle Brigades under command. 60th Army was on the right flank of Central Front, centered just east of Rylsk, still facing German 2nd Army. As the German offensive was expected at the base of the salient it was unlikely that Chernyakhovskii's troops would come under attack, but they fortified their positions strongly. Their sector stretched 92km, with 65th Army on the right and Voronezh Front's 38th Army on the left. Three rifle divisions (112th, 322nd, 141st) and two rifle brigades were in first echelon, with two divisions and one brigade in second. On the boundary with 38th Army the 14th Antitank Brigade and 130th Tank Brigade were stationed. Chernyakhovskii had his headquarters in Lgov. In the event the German offensive unfolded as expected and 60th Army saw little action.

== Into Ukraine ==
Following the German offensive, most of Central Front took part in Operation Kutuzov against German 9th Army in the Oryol salient, but 60th Army was not involved. Colonel Polyakov left the division on August 23; he would later lead the 82nd Rifle Division after serving a chief of staff of 77th Rifle Corps. He was replaced the next day by Col. Aleksandr Vasilevich Gladkov, a cavalry officer who had been arrested during the Great Purge. He had been wounded and hospitalized twice earlier in the war and had led the 100th Cavalry Division in 1941-42.

On August 26 the Front resumed the offensive against Army Group Center, striking at the 9th Army's right flank east of Karachev and near 2nd Army's center at Sevsk and east of Klintsy. The thrust at Sevsk scored a deep penetration and the German Army Group committed what reserves it had to a counterattack against it on August 29. This left an opening for 60th Army to make a sudden advance to Yesman, 40km behind 2nd Army's south flank. Two days later Rylsk was taken, and the division won its first battle honor:

RYLSK... 112th Rifle Division (Colonel Gladkov, Aleksandr Vasilevich)... The troops who participated in the battles near Sevsk, Glukhov and Rylsk, by the order of the Supreme High Command of 31 August 1943, and a commendation in Moscow, are given a salute of 12 artillery salvoes from 124 guns.

Rokossovskii now regrouped 13th Army and 2nd Tank Army from his right to his left flank to exploit this success. Over the following days 2nd Army retreated to the Desna River as Rokossovskii shifted his attention to the left (north) flank of 4th Panzer Army. On September 9 elements of Central Front crossed the Desna south of Novhorod-Siverskyi, and at Otsekin and between September 16 and 18 the 7th Guards Mechanized Corps aimed a two-pronged thrust northward across the Desna on either side of Chernihiv which collapsed the south flank of 2nd Army. The Front now continued its advance toward the Dniepr in the direction of Kyiv.

== Battles for Kyiv ==
On September 30 the commander of Voronezh Front's (as of October 20 1st Ukrainian) 38th Army, Maj. Gen. N. E. Chibisov, presented a plan to his Front commander, Army Gen. N. F. Vatutin, to capture Kyiv through a double envelopment by two rifle corps. This overly ambitious plan did create a pair of bridgeheads, but the attempt collapsed by October 3. At midnight on October 5 both the 60th and 13th Armies were transferred from Central Front. They were to join 38th Army in a further effort to take the city from the north. The 112th would remain under 1st Ukrainian Front for the duration of the war.

On October 6 Vatutin assigned the following task to Chernyakhovskii, after assigning him the 17th Guards Rifle Corps and the 1st Guards Cavalry Corps: to clear the south bank of the Uzh River on October 6-7 and take a bridgehead on the south bank of the Teteriv River on a sector from Pilyava to Zatonsk. Overnight on October 7/8 the 1st Guards Cavalry would cross the Dniepr and the Teteriv, then launch a main attack to the southwest between the Zdvizh and Irpen Rivers, rolling up the German front. Chernyakhovskii decided to lead with 1st Guards Cavalry and 77th Rifle Corps toward Manuilsk and Litvinovka, with 24th and 30th Rifle Corps supporting with an attack toward Dymer. However, this plan did not hold up due to divergent axes of the various corps.

A German counteroffensive by elements of 7th Panzer, 399th Infantry, and 217th Infantry Divisions struck 60th Army heavily in the Hornostaipil area throughout October 6-7, after which the panzers were pulled back to reserve near Ivanivka. The next day Chernyakhovskii took the initiative at Hornostaipil, and mutual attacks also began south of Chornobil on October 9. By October 10, 60th Army had a large number of Dniepr crossings in operation, including a 30-ton capacity low-water bridge, four 30-ton ferries, 12 two to 12 ton ferries, and a landing crossing. On this date it was reported that the strength of the 112th was above average for the Army, with 6,211 personnel, 46 82mm and 16 120mm mortars, ten 76mm regimental and 19 76mm divisional guns, but only ten of its full allotment of 12 122mm howitzers.

At noon on October 11 the 60th and 38th Armies attacked simultaneously as German counterattacks struck back, including at 77th Corps along both banks of the Teteriv. A particularly strong attack by 7th and 8th Panzer south of the river reached the rear of 1st Guards Cavalry and cut it off from its crossings. The 30th and 24th Corps made only minor progress, although the latter's 248th Rifle Brigade took the village of Tolokun. Further efforts to gain traction over the next three days were also futile, with German tanks breaking through to the bridgehead at Lyutizh at one point. At 0150 hours on October 15 Vatutin signaled Chernyakhovskii as follows:

The army's forces are unsuccessful along almost all sectors and are standing in place. The chief reason for this is the dispersion of men and materiel...
If you do not adopt decisive measures for pushing the 1st Guards Cavalry Corps forward into the enemy's depth, then there is a danger that the cavalry corps will be transformed into a typical rifle formation...
I order:
1. To plan and organize the breakthrough of the enemy's front along a narrow sector, by creating an artillery density of no less than 150 tubes per kilometre of front.

In a further message, Vatutin stressed the significance of linking up the bridgeheads of 60th and 38th Armies.

The offensive was renewed on October 15 at 1400 hours. 60th Army made only minor gains, taking the village of Rovy. Only part of the Army attacked the next day, again with little success. Meanwhile, 1st Guards Cavalry was suffering significant losses trying to break out. During October 17 7th Panzer broke through 24th Corps' front and made a deep penetration, leading to a day-long fight between these forces plus 1st Cavalry; two regiments of panzer troops were encircled but managed to break out with losses. It was not until overnight on October 17/18 that the relief of 1st Cavalry by 77th Corps began, and it began its transfer to 38th Army. 60th Army was now officially on the defensive. During October 18-23 it was involved in heavy fighting as German forces repeatedly tried to collapse the bridgehead over the Teteriv. 24th Corps was repeatedly struck in its Dmitrievka sector. At 2300 the next day the STAVKA released directive No. 30232, which set out the plan and date for a renewed offensive. Most importantly, the 3rd Guards Tank Army would be secretly removed from the bridgehead south of Kyiv at Velykyi Bukryn and shifted to the Lyutizh bridgehead.

A major regrouping took place during October 25-November 1, entirely at night or covered by smoke screens. By the latter date up to seven divisions faced 60th Army, quite a high concentration, although all were significantly under strength. The 112th was well below its own authorized strength, and its total personnel had decreased to 5,506. The Army's task was much as previous, to attack in the direction of Rovy and Dymer with nine divisions and then advance between the Zdvizh and Irpin, covering the flank of 38th Army while the latter took Kyiv and it captured the railway from the city to Korosten. Subsequently, the offensive would be developed to the west. Six divisions and 59th Tank Regiment would be in first echelon; 24th Corps, with the 150th Tank Brigade, was to capture Rostesno and exploit to the southwest, reaching the line Alekseevka–height 150.8–height 143.7 by dusk. By the end of the third day it was to consolidate on the right bank of the Zdvizh River to prevent counterattacks from Katyuzhanka and Dymer. The Corps had all its forces in a single echelon. The Corps' breakthrough sector was 4km wide, and it would be supported by 93.5 guns and mortars per kilometre, with a long-range group for counterbattery fire and other such tasks. The opening bombardment would be of 40 minute duration.

The offensive opened at 0800 hours, with the infantry and armor attacking at 0840. 30th and 24th Corps, making the main attack, broke through the German defense on an 18km-wide front, capturing Fyodorovka, Rovy, Rostesno, Glebovo, and by day's end the northern approaches to Dymer. The terrain was heavily forested, and the artillery began displacing forward to deal with strongpoints at close range. Five counterattacks by tanks and infantry were repelled, and 550 prisoners were taken by 60th and 38th Armies, but the first day objectives were not completely met, and Chernyakhovskii was constantly urged to increase his pace. The next day the two Corps attacked along their entire front, making an advance of 2km-6km, completing the capture of Dymer and several other settlements. 8th Panzer, with five battalions of infantry, attempted to restore the situation at Dymer, without success. In the rear, 3rd Guards Tanks moved to its jumping-off positions prior to being committed into the gap. On November 5, 24th Corps made significant gains along its left flank, while 38th Army was fighting in the center and southwest of Kyiv. The following morning the city was cleared, and while 24th Corps made only minor advances on its flanks while repelling counterattacks on its center.

=== Advance from Kyiv ===
During the day the main elements of 60th Army advanced up to 12km on the left flank. After clearing Kyiv 38th Army then advanced another 20km. 8th Panzer withdrew across the Zdvizh, and the Kyiv–Korosten railroad was cut. However, the Armies were beginning to face serious shortages of ammunition and fuel. Vatutin ordered the offensive to continue into western Ukraine with 60th Army directed to take bridgeheads over the Teteriv in the area of Radomyshl by the end of November 9. The general line of advance was to be to the west on the Korosten axis. By the end of November 8 the Army gained another 10km against weak resistance. The next day the Teteriv was crossed and over 100 prisoners were taken, along with a large quantity of abandoned equipment. The 112th accounted for as much as two battalions, including artillery and mortars, destroyed southwest of the Koblitskii Woods. By this time 60th and 38th Armies were spread along an attack front of some 220km, and the German forces facing the 60th were retreating southwest toward Zhytomyr.

=== Kiev Strategic Defensive Operation ===
By November 12 the artillery was increasingly falling behind the advancing infantry and very little ammunition was at the front. The STAVKA was concerned that Vatutin was failing to consolidate captured ground and also noted increasing counterattacks. 38th Army was ordered to take up a static defense, while 60th moved a total of four divisions into Front reserve. During November 15 the 38th was struck by heavy counterattacks on several sectors, and lost some ground. By now Zhytomyr had been taken by 1st Guards Cavalry, and 60th Army was entrusted with its defense. At the same time, 24th and 77th Corps pushed on to Korosten, with the 112th strung out along a 40km-wide front while its forward detachments took Volodarsk-Volynskii and Chervonoarmeisk. At this time its personnel strength had declined 4,898. The city was taken on November 17, and the 112th won its second battle honor:

KOROSTEN ...112th Rifle Division (Colonel Gladkov, Aleksandr Vasilevich)... The troops that participated in the liberation of Korosten, by order of the Supreme Commander-in-Chief of 18 November 1943 and a commendation in Moscow, are given a salute of 12 artillery salvoes by 124 guns.

This was reconfirmed on December 30 when the city was again taken during the Zhitomir-Berdichev Offensive.

At this point the Army was ordered over to the defensive. On November 22 a German counterattack retook Chernykhiv (from where the Army commander got his family name), but as the weather cleared the Red Air Force was finally able to intervene in the fighting. As forces of 38th Army were threatened with encirclement near Brusiliv, Chernyakhovskii was ordered to create a shock group, primarily 30th Corps, to intervene toward there and Chernykhiv. Before this could get underway a German counterattack near Korosten on November 24 encircled the 226th Rifle Division in the city. The divisional commander, Col. V. Ya. Petrenko, was ordered to hold Korosten at all costs during the next 48 hours until the arrival of the 6th Guards Rifle Division in the area. This fighting continued until the end of the month; the 226th managed to escape with significant losses and the town remained in German hands at the end of the battle.

=== Zhitomir–Berdichev Offensive ===
Late in December the 112th was transferred to 13th Army, where it was assigned to 76th Rifle Corps. The Front returned to the offensive on December 24 on both sides of the Zhytomyr–Kyiv highway. LIX Army Corps was attempting to hold Korosten against 13th and 60th Armies, which went over to the attack the following day. XXXXVIII Panzer Corps attempted to hem in and slow down the spearheads, with little effect. By December 29 LIX Corps was in full retreat to the west. By January 3, 1944, what remained of LIX Corps had been forced back to Horodnytsia on the pre-1939 border with Poland. Rivne and Lutsk were taken by February 2 and March 1, after which the front stabilized. In recognition of its successes in this campaign the 112th was awarded the Order of Suvorov, 2nd Degree, on February 7. During January the division had returned to 24th Corps, now in 13th Army, but in February it was reassigned to 27th Rifle Corps, where it would remain for the next 12 months.

== Lvov-Sandomierz Offensive ==
On June 3 Colonel Gladkov was promoted to the rank of major general. By the start of the Lvov-Sandomierz operation the 13th Army was in the Brody area. It was under command of Lt. Gen. N. P. Pukhov with nine reinforced rifle divisions and he was to use five of them, including the 112th, to penetrate the defense on a 4km-wide sector between Zviniache and Krasuv, developing the advance toward Rava-Ruska, defeating the German grouping in that area in the process. The 112th was specifically to attack on the shock group's left flank in the sector Galichany–Pulgany, while also making a secondary effort toward Stoianuv. A subsidiary drive that involved the 102nd Rifle Corps would move to the southwest and complete the encirclement of Brody in cooperation with right-flank forces of 60th Army. 13th Army was expected to attain a depth of 30-35km by the end of the first day and a further 10-15km on the day following. 1st Guards Tank Army would exploit the gaps created by 13th and 60th Armies.

The operation began on July 13. Overnight, reconnaissance detachments had determined that the German forces holding the forward defensive positions in front of 13th and 3rd Guards Army had begun to withdraw under cover of rearguards. Forward detachments began advancing at 0300 hours, but these were only successful on the right flank of 13th Army, gaining 6-8km before hitting significant resistance. The Front commander, Marshal Konev, ordered the forward battalions to renew the attack at 0515 on July 14, following a 30-minute artillery preparation. The right-flank forces soon took the main defensive belt and began an aggressive pursuit. The next afternoon Konev prepared to commit his Baranov Cavalry-Mechanized Group on the morning of July 16 into 13th Army's penetration sector in order to complete the encirclement of Brody. In the event the Group was slow off the mark, advancing behind 27th Corps at 1400, earning a rebuke from Konev. By dusk it was 4-5km ahead of 13th Army, which had itself advanced up to 15km.

In order to prevent the encirclement of Brody the German command concentrated infantry and armor forces south of Koltuv, launching counterstrikes through July 16. During the next two days 13th Army covered as much as 30km, reaching as far as Volodimyr. By the end of July 18 the Baranov Group and 3rd Guards Tank Army had linked up to encircle the Brody grouping, largely consisting of XIII Army Corps. During the next day the 112th, fighting north of Grabova was working with 102nd Corps to tighten the inner ring of encirclement. Brody fell late on July 22 with only small groups and individuals escaping to the west. Meanwhile, the remainder of 13th Army, with 3rd Guards Army and 1st Guards Tank Army, were now in a position to advance on the Vistula at and near Sandomierz. The latter reached the east bank of the San River late on July 23, followed by the 27th and 24th Corps at a rate of 30-35km per day against minimal resistance. By the next day the German forces in Lviv were also facing encirclement and the city fell on July 27 while the remnants of the garrison fell back toward Sambir.

General Pukhov was now tasked with reaching the Vistula from Sandomierz to the mouth of the Visloka River by the morning of July 29. This was to be immediately followed by a crossing operation using the means at hand. In the event 24th Corps arrived on July 30 and its 350th Rifle Division crossed north of Baranuv from the march. By August 4 three more divisions had joined it. Counterattacks by up to one infantry division backed by 40-50 tanks took place during August 2nd and 3rd in an effort to break into the rear of 13th Army, but by now elements of 3rd Guards Tank Army had entered the bridgehead and, after some ground was lost, the German force was held. German counterattacks continued over the following days, with the transfer of the 24th and 23rd Panzer Divisions, plus several infantry units, in an increasingly desperate effort to eliminate the bridgehead. In response, Konev ordered it reinforced by 5th Guards Army. The intense fighting continued through August 18, when Sandomierz itself was taken. On August 9 the 112th was awarded the Order of the Red Banner of its success in breaking the German defenses in the Lviv direction. In addition, by Stalin's order No. 0295 of September 1 the 385th Regiment was awarded the honorific "Vistula" for its part in the crossing operations.

== Into Poland and Germany ==
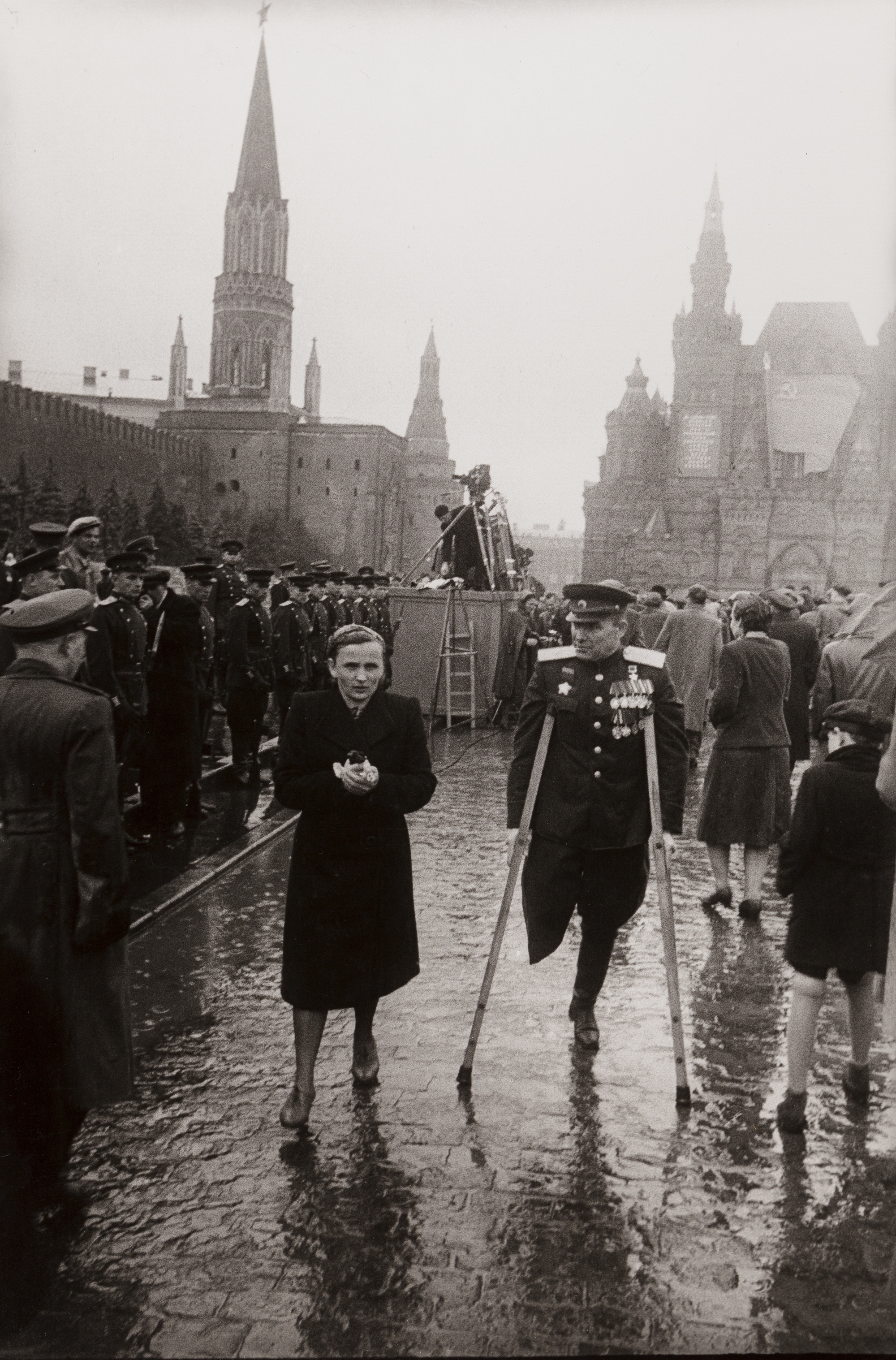
General Gladkov and his wife after the Victory Parade in Moscow, June 24, 1945

The Vistula-Oder offensive began on 1st Ukrainian Front's sector on January 12. Three combined arms armies (13th, 52nd, and 5th Guards), backed by 3rd Guards and 4th Tank Armies and two tank corps, would attack from the Sandomierz bridgehead. The initial objective was Radomsko before exploiting toward Breslau. 4th Tanks would enter the breach on 13th Army's sector and assist it in capturing Kielce before moving on to take crossings over the Pilica River by the third day. The artillery preparation for the main attack began at 1000 hours and continued for an hour and 47 minutes, followed by a rolling barrage. The attack was successful enough that the tanks could be committed during the afternoon. In recognition of their success in breaking out of the bridgehead, on February 19 the 385th and 416th Regiments would be awarded the Order of Bogdan Khmelnitskii, 2nd Degree, while the 524th Regiment received the Order of Suvorov, 3rd Degree.

By the end of the advance though Poland 13th Army had reached the Oder River along the entire front from Keben to Malcz, forced the river with the assistance of 4th Tanks, and captured a bridgehead west of Keben and Steinau up to 16km deep and 30km wide, as well as a smaller one on the left flank. As of January 28 the 27th and 102nd Corps were in the Army's first echelon on the west bank of the Oder River on a 86km-wide front and engaged in heavy fighting to expand several bridgeheads. On January 27 General Gladkov was wounded and hospitalized, losing his right leg at the knee. On April 6 he would be made a Hero of the Soviet Union. He would remain in rehabilitation until January 1946 after which he served as head of Automotive Base, Main Staff, Soviet Ground Forces until his retirement at the end of 1952. He was replaced by Col. Dmitrii Tikhonovich Zhukov, who would remain in command into the postwar.

=== Lower Silesian Offensive ===
1st Ukrainian Front carried out a substantial regrouping from January 29 to February 7 during which the total frontage held by 13th Army was reduced to just 18km. 24th and 102nd Corps was in the first echelon with 27th Corps moved to second, but the 112th was attached to 4th Tank Army for the duration of the operation due to that Army's shortage of motorized infantry following the January battles. The offensive began at 0930 hours on February 8, following a 50-minute artillery preparation. 102nd Corps quickly crushed the first German position and advanced up to 8km by day's end. 24th Corps, on the other hand, faced two heavily fortified villages on its right flank and a large woods stretching well to the west. The attacks on the villages were stymied, even with the backing of the 61st Tank Brigade. However the Corps' left flank division took advantage of the success of 52nd Army's attack to its left, advanced 4km and reached Oberau. Jointly these advances put the two Armies in good position to outflank and possibly encircle the Hermann Göring Panzer Division, which was defending the large woods nearby.

On February 9 the greatest success came on the Army's flanks, with the assistance of 4th Tanks. 6th Mechanized Corps reached the Primkenau area, while 10th Tank Corps bypassed Luben and headed for Oberglasersdorf. The 112th relieved the 93rd Tank Brigade late in the day, freeing it to carry on its advance. The next day the main body of 13th Army advanced in the wake of 4th Tank Army, with the objective of forcing the Bober River. On February 11 the Front's shock group faced stiffening German resistance while 24th Corps spent the entire day fighting with rearguards which were covering the main forces' retreat to the Bober. By the end of the day the main shock group had advanced up to 60km and had expanded the width of the breakthrough to 160km, reaching the Bober along a number of sectors. The main forces of 4th Tanks attacked on February 13 in the direction of Sommerfeld and Zorau after crossing the river. By late the next day the 112th had moved up to the Pferten area.

By February 15 the 4th Tank Army's main forces were attempting to cross the Eastern Neisse River while German forces were fighting to cut it off and restore the Bober front. Konev's situation was complicated by the fact that he had no second echelon nor reserves. As a result, he chose to concentrate on defeating the German grouping around Breslau, which he would follow with a renewed push on the main axis. The city was encircled on February 15 by 5th Guards, 6th, and 21st Armies, but its defense had been significantly strengthened and there was no immediate prospect of reducing it. Meanwhile, the German efforts to eliminate the Bober bridgeheads continued through February 19. XXXX Panzer Corps and Großdeutschland Panzer Corps had cut communications to 4th Tanks on February 15, but these were restored within days by 13th Army. On February 20 the German forces along the Bober were finally forced to fall back to the Neisse, which was reached by the 13th the next day. By now the Front's forces were spread over a 520km-wide frontage. 6th Army took full responsibility for the siege of Breslau on February 24.

=== Upper Silesian Offensive ===
As the campaign culminated the 112th returned to 13th Army, now back in 24th Corps. Prior to the start of the Upper Silesian Offensive on March 15, which did not directly involve this Army, the 112th was reassigned to the 34th Guards Rifle Corps of 5th Guards Army, which was given a supporting role. The division began in second echelon, with the intention of committing it in the area of Louisdorf in order to roll up the German front east and northeast of Strelen. This move would be supported by the 4th Guards Tank Corps. The offensive began with forward detachments of 5th Guards and 21st Armies attacking closely behind a 10-minute artillery preparation, but that of 34th Guards Corps failed to carry out its full assignment. The Corps' main attack, supported by 4th Guards Tanks, began at 1120 hours after an 80-minute preparation. After breaking through on a 3km front it managed to widen this to 5km by day's end and capture part of the German second position. Continuing to attack through the night and the next day it gained just 3km.

By March 24 the 34th Guards Corps had suffered significant losses, along with 4th Guards Tanks, and it seemed unlikely they could take Strelen without reinforcements. The 32nd Guards Rifle Corps was committed with the 112th operationally subordinated to it. This force was to advance on Alt Heinrichau before reaching the line Praus–Stachau–Schildberg. To do so it would have to cross the Klein Loe Canal and the villages on the approaches had been made into strongpoints. The attack began at 1020 hours after an artillery preparation, and the leading 95th and 97th Guards Rifle Divisions forced the Canal and captured several strongpoints while also fighting off counterattacks by infantry and tanks. During the next two days the 95th Guards attacked Strelen from the north while the 112th struck from the west and southwest. By the morning of March 27 the guardsmen had cleared the town, but the 97th Guards and the 112th were stalled by heavy fire and continuous counterattacks. The next day Konev ordered 5th Guards Army to cease attacking and consolidate. Within days the 112th was transferred to the 74th Rifle Corps of 6th Army.

==== Siege of Breslau ====
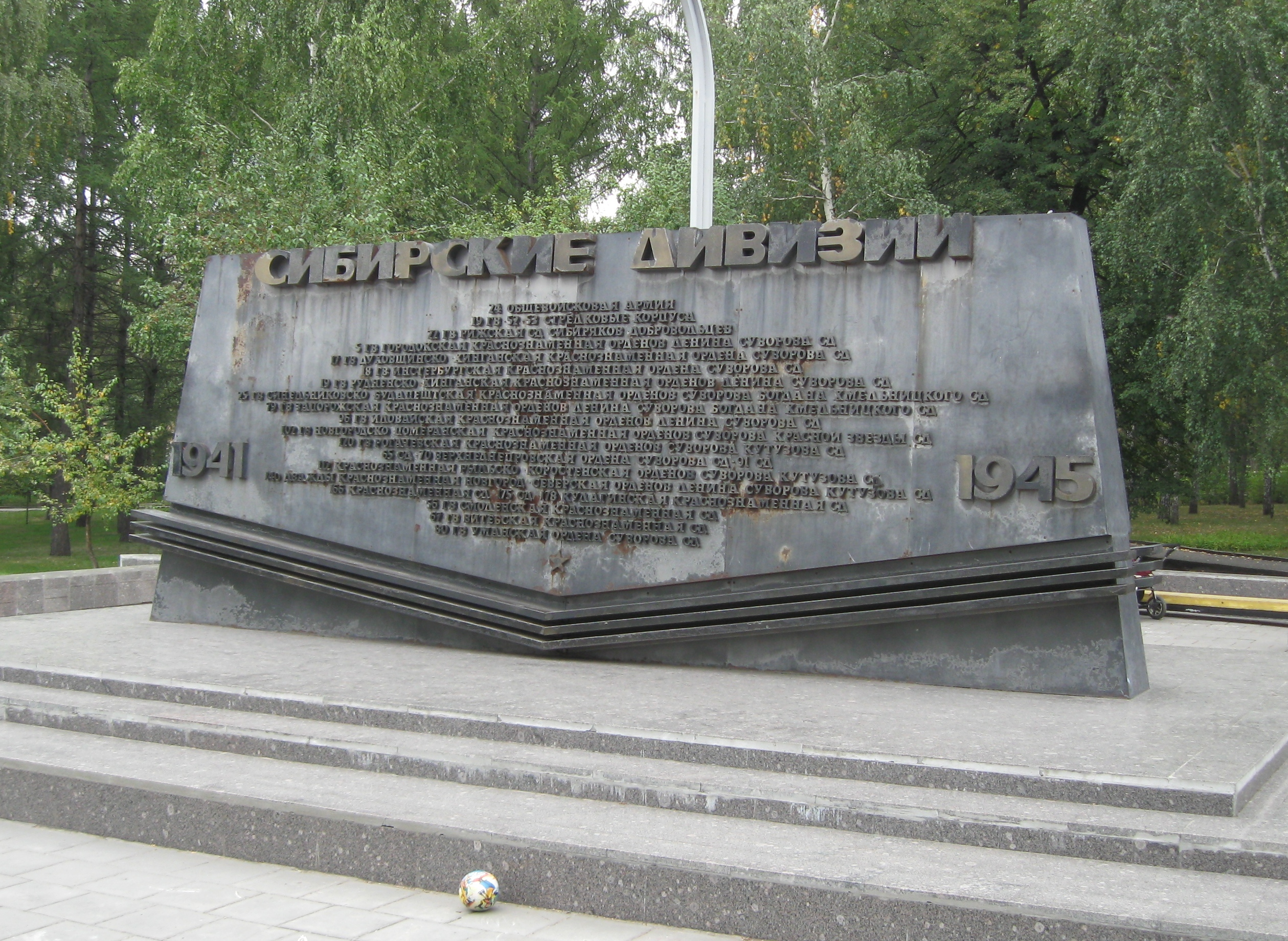
Monument to the Siberian rifle divisions, including the 112th, at Novosibirsk

Within days of its arrival in 6th Army the 112th forced a bridgehead over the Oder northwest of the city. For this feat, by Stalin's order No. 060 of April 5 the 416th Regiment was given the honorific "Oder", while on the same date the 385th and 524th Regiments both received the Order of Alexander Nevsky, and the 436th Artillery Regiment won the Order of the Red Star.

== Postwar ==
In a final transfer the 112th was moved in April to the 22nd Rifle Corps of 6th Army. The city managed to hold out until May 6. The division was still there when the shooting stopped. On June 4 it received the Order of Kutuzov for its part in the siege. The men and women of the division now shared the full title of 112th Rifle, Rylsk-Korosten, Order of the Red Banner, Orders of Suvorov and Kutuzov Division. (Russian: 112-я Рыльско-Коростеньская Краснознамённая орденов Суворова и Кутузова стрелковая дивизия.)

According to STAVKA Order No. 11096 of May 29, part 8, the 112th was listed as one of those divisions to be "disbanded in place". In accordance to this directive the division was disbanded in July.
