= 147th Automobile Base =

Military unit

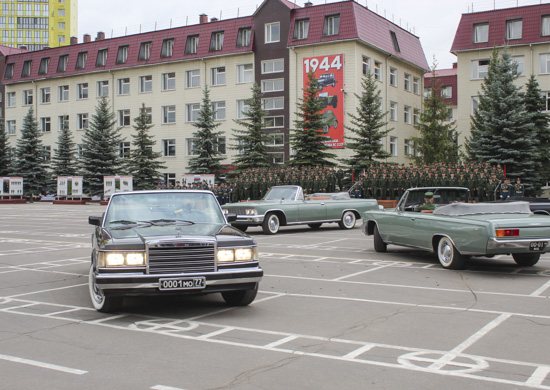
- Zil cars from the base.
- Active: 1918 – present
- Country: Soviet Union; Russia
- Branch: Ministry of Defense
- Part of: Main Agency of Automobiles and Tanks (1998-2007); Motor Transport Service (since 2007)
- Garrison/HQ: Presnensky Val, Moscow
- Motto(s): "Loyalty to tradition is the path to success!"
- Decorations: Order of the Red Star

The 147th Automobile Base is a motor transport depot of the Russian Armed Forces, subordinated directly to the Ministry of Defense, whose task is to provide vehicles for the military command of the MoD, as well as servicing foreign military delegations, and the leadership of military districts/fleets of the Russian Navy arriving in Moscow on a service need at the request of the Main Operational Directorate of the General Staff of the Armed Forces.

== History ==
=== Creation and early years ===
On 25 October 1918, the Communication Service was formed via an order of the Revolutionary Military Council to be used for the expedition of mail and official correspondence from its headquarters. On International Workers' Day in 1922, servicemen of the garage unit took its first military oath during the military parade on Red Square. By the end of the 1930s, it was renamed to the automobile bases of the People's Commissariat of Defense and had become larger under Armored Directorate of the Red Army. In 1938, construction began on its present-day headquarters on 9 Presnensky Val Street, a unique six-story building in which cars on all floors could enter and exit at the same time, designed by architect Mikhail Minkus.

=== Second World War ===
Just before the start of the Great Patriotic War, the motor depot formed several convoys to send to the front, ensuring the transportation of representatives of the State Defense Committee in the battlefield. On 13 May 1944, the Presidium of the Supreme Soviet was awarded with the Order of the Red Star. The depot was responsible for maintenance during the Yalta Conference in 1945, during which it was, by order of the Rear Chief of the Red Army, 14 of its best drivers of the selected and sent to the Crimea.

=== 1946-2009 ===
In June 1946, the NKO Motor Depot was subordinated to the General Staff of the Soviet Army and was headed by Major General Aleksandr Gladkov. Since 1975, car depot has taken part in the annual competition "For traffic safety", which is held among all car companies in Moscow. More than 60 drivers of the depot have in different years been awarded the honorary title of "The best driver of the city of Moscow". Personnel of the base took part in military exercises such as "Dnepr", "West-77", and "South" during the Cold War. In 2009, it was abolished as a structural subdivision of the Ministry of Defense, with its equipment and structural units being transferred to the 147 Automobile Base.

On the occasion of its 75th anniversary in July 2019, the servicemen of the base demonstrated the UAZ assembly, elements of extreme driving, as well as "danced" the waltz on all cars that historically took part in military parades in Moscow.

== Role in Moscow Parades ==
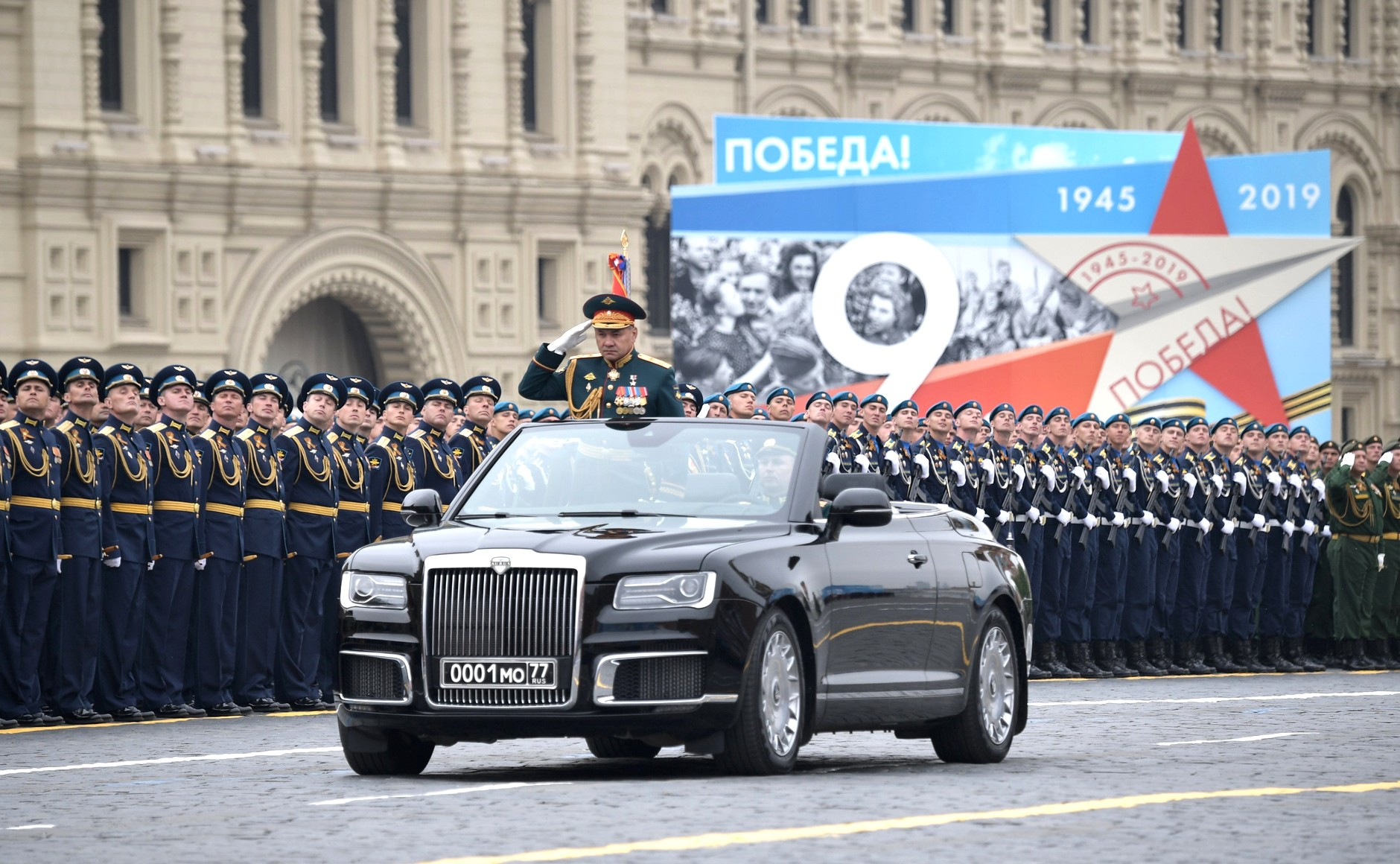
Cars of the 147th Base during the 2019 Moscow Victory Day Parade.

It plays a major role in all military parades on Red Square, particularly the Moscow Victory Day Parade. It specifically provides two drivers for the inspection cars of the Minister of Defence and the parade commander. Prior to 1945, most were held on horseback, with a parade convertible being used for the first time in 1940. Cars replaced horses at military parades in 1953, the year of Soviet leader Joseph Stalin's death. This led to the base having a more active role in parades, with the main vehicle then being a ZIS-110B. In 1981, the ZIL-115V was introduced, with three convertibles being built at the Likhachev Plant to participate in parades. It took part in military parade. on Red Square until 2009, being replaced by a black version that year. In 2019, the ZILs were replaced by a specialized Aurus Senat armored limousine.

== Base band ==
The base military band was founded in 1977 when musician Yuri Saygashov was asked to organize a band within the General Staff. In 1996, the band, which by that time had become a regular unit, was headed by Yakov Zinoviev. From 2001 to 2008, it was directed by Yuri Kubyshkin, and from 2008 to 2011, it was directed by Andrei Nisenbaum. Both of them, like many band members, are graduates of the Military Institute of Military Conductors. Since June 2011, the band has been led by Anton Mezentsev. Currently 13 contract servicemen and 7 conscripts serve in the band, serving as one of the leading creative units in the territory of the former Moscow Military District. It is part of the Combined Military Band of the Moscow Garrison during all Victory Day Parades, and takes part in various large ceremonial and mourning events.

== Gallery ==
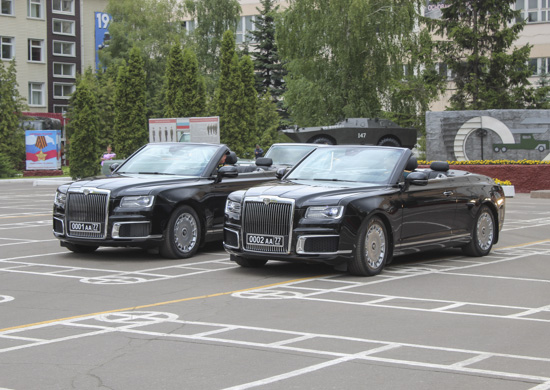
Aurus Senat cars

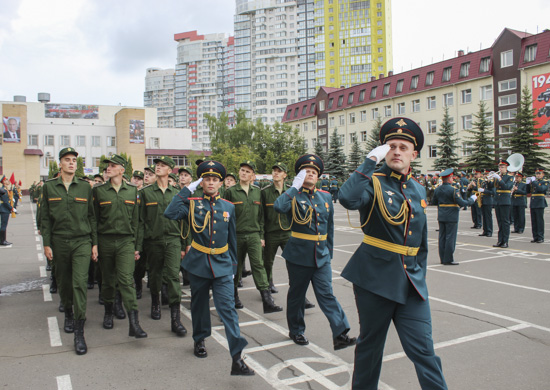

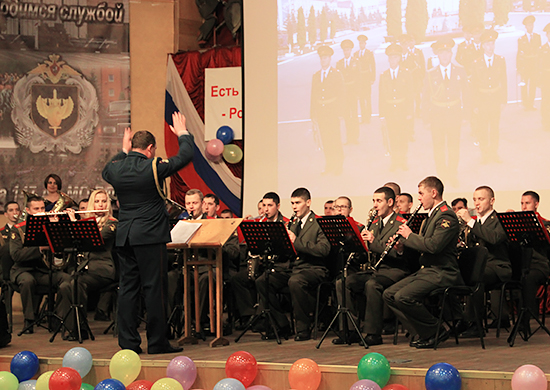
Unit band

== See also ==
- Central Military Band of the Ministry of Defense of Russia
