= Aleksandr Gladkov =

Soviet Army major general

Aleksandr Vasilyevich Gladkov
- Gladkov, c. 1945
- Born: 22 June 1902; Simferopol, Taurida Governorate, Russian Empire
- Died: 3 April 1969 (aged 66) Moscow, Soviet Union
- Allegiance: Russian Empire; Soviet Union
- Branch: Imperial Russian Army; Red Army
- Service years: 1916–1917; 1918–1952
- Rank: Major general
- Commands: 112th Motor Rifle Division; 129th Rifle Division; 112th Rifle Division
- Conflicts: World War I; Russian Civil War; Sino-Soviet conflict (1929); World War II
- Awards: Hero of the Soviet Union

Aleksandr Vasilyevich Gladkov (Russian: Александр Васильевич Гладков; 22 June 1902 – 3 April 1969) was a Soviet Army major general and a Hero of the Soviet Union.

A veteran of World War I and the Russian Civil War, Gladkov rose to regimental commander in the cavalry of the interwar Red Army, but was imprisoned during the Great Purge. He was freed and returned to regimental command before the war broke out. Gladkov rose to divisional command, leading the 112th Motor Rifle Division, destroyed during Operation Typhoon. After a series of training posts and service as a deputy division commander, he took command of the 112th Rifle Division in August 1943, leading it until he lost his leg in a German bombing raid during the Vistula–Oder offensive in January 1945. Seriously wounded three times during the war, Gladkov was decorated multiple times for his leadership of the division, and received the title Hero of the Soviet Union for his performance during the Vistula–Oder offensive. Discharged from the hospital postwar, Gladkov continued to serve in the army until the early 1950s.

== Early life, World War I and Russian Civil War ==
A Russian, Aleksandr Vasilyevich Gladkov was born in Simferopol, Crimea, on 22 June 1902, the son of a laborer. He worked as a printer in an Omsk printing house. During World War I, Gladkov joined the Imperial Russian Army in August 1916 and fought near Riga, serving with the scout detachment of the 435th Yamburg Infantry Regiment of the 109th Infantry Division. After the October Revolution Gladkov was demobilized in November 1917 and departed to Turkestan. As the Russian Civil War began, Gladkov joined the Red Army on 15 March 1918 at Namangan fortress and was enlisted in the 1st Namangan Fortress Company. As an ordinary soldier in a detachment dispatched from the fortress, he took part in fighting against the White Orenburg Cossacks during the summer of 1918 in the region of Chashkan railway station in Orenburg Oblast and near Akhtubinsk, before returning to the fortress.

In May 1919 he was enrolled as a cadet in the Fergana Oblast Courses for Command Personnel. With a detachment drawn from the Namangan fortress garrison and the Fergana courses, Gladkov took part in the fighting against the Basmachi in Fergana Oblast. After graduating from the instructor section of the courses, in September, he served in the 1st Semirechye Expeditionary Detachment and 1st Semirechye Cavalry Regiment as an instructor and assistant chief of the regimental machine gun detachment. From January 1920 he served as assistant chief of the machine gun detachment of the 2nd Semirechye Cavalry Regiment. With these units, he took part in the elimination of resistance to Soviet rule in the Semirechye. Gladkov was admitted to the 15th Alma-Ata Cavalry Command Courses for further training in May 1920. While at the courses, Gladkov took part in fighting against the Basmachi of Ibrahim Bek in Fergana Oblast, near Samarkand and Bukhara.

== Interwar period ==
Completing the courses in October 1922, Gladkov was sent to the 1st Cavalry Army, where he was posted to the 27th Bykadorov Cavalry Regiment of the 2nd Stavropol Cavalry Division as a platoon commander. Gladkov was transferred to the divisional school for junior command personnel in February 1923, where he served as a platoon commander and assistant squadron commander. In May 1924 he was transferred to command a squadron of the 26th Belozersk Cavalry Regiment of the division, by then renumbered as the 5th Stavropol Cavalry Division. With a detachment drawn from the regiment, Gladkov took part in the suppression of North Caucasian resistance in Terek Oblast during June and July. Gladkov was transferred to the 75th Cavalry Regiment of the 5th Separate Kuban Cavalry Brigade in May 1925, serving as a squadron commander, assistant chief and chief of the regimental school, and acting assistant regimental commander for personnel. He completed the Cavalry Command Personnel Improvement Courses between October 1926 and August 1927, after which he returned to the regiment and was appointed chief and political instructor of the regimental school.

From August 1928 Gladkov served as assistant chief of staff and acting chief of staff of the 75th Regiment, which transferred to the Transbaikal Group of Forces of the Special Red Banner Far Eastern Army during this period. From July 1929 to January 1930 he was acting chief of staff of the regiment during the Chinese Eastern Railway border conflict. In April 1931 he was appointed chief of staff of the 87th Transbaikal Cavalry Regiment of the 9th Separate Cavalry Brigade, and took command of the regiment in February 1934. Then a major, Gladkov was transferred to serve as commander and commissar of the 54th Cossack Motorized Regiment of the 12th Cavalry Division in March 1937. He was arrested and imprisoned by the NKVD between 12 October 1937 and 27 May 1939 during the Great Purge, and then placed at the disposal of the Red Army Command Personnel Directorate. In July 1939 he was appointed a tactics instructor at the Cavalry Command Personnel Improvement Courses in the North Caucasus Military District, and on 29 July 1940 commander of the 18th Motor Rifle Regiment of the 18th Tank Division of the 7th Mechanized Corps in the Moscow Military District.

== World War II ==
After Germany invaded the Soviet Union, the 18th Tank Division and its parent corps were assigned to the 20th Army of the Stavka reserve. From the beginning of July the corps operated on the Western Front, taking part in defensive fighting on the lines of the Western Dvina and the Dnieper, covering the Borisov, Smolensk and Yartsevo axis. From 6 to 8 July Gladkov's regiment and its parent division took part in the counterattack of the front from the area north of Orsha towards Senno against the flank of the German 3rd Panzer Group, then retreated towards Smolensk. Gladkov was wounded on 12 July in the Lyubavichi region and evacuated to the rear. In September he was appointed commander of the 112th Rifle Division, which as part of the 16th Army of the Western Front took part in defensive fighting in the Yartsevo region. The division was surrounded in the Vyazma pocket by the German attack in Operation Typhoon in early October. Gladkov was wounded during the fighting that month. While encircled, Colonel Gladkov took command of the 129th Rifle Division. By 23 November the division managed to break out of the encirclement, but was disbanded due to its heavy losses. Gladkov was appointed commander of the 100th Cavalry Division, forming at Samarkand in the Central Asian Military District. The formation of the division was cancelled on 12 March 1942 and Gladkov appointed a tactics instructor at the Cavalry Command Personnel Improvement Courses in Moscow in April. From May he served as the supervisor of a training group of the courses.

In August he was transferred to serve as deputy commander of the 63rd Cavalry Division of the Transcaucasus Front. The division defended the passes of the Main Caucasian Range as part of the 46th Army until 20 September, then was withdrawn to the Zugdidi region for rebuilding. Between 18 and 22 October the division was relocated to Chervlennaya, where it was assigned to the 44th Army of the front's Northern Group of Forces. On 28 October Gladkov was seriously contused. After being treated in a hospital until April 1943, he was placed at the disposal of the commander of the Red Army cavalry.

Gladkov was appointed commander of the 112th Rifle Division, a unit not related to his old command, in August 1943. He led the division in the Chernigov-Pripyat offensive, the Battle of the Dnieper, and the Battle of Kiev as part of the 60th Army. During the offensive, the division captured Rylsk on 31 August, and received the name of the town as an honorific. For the capture of Rylsk, 24th Rifle Corps commander Nikolay Kiryukhin recommended Gladkov for the Order of Suvorov, 2nd class, which was upgraded to a second Order of the Red Banner, awarded on 20 September. The recommendation read:

Comrade Gladkov, commanding the 112th Rifle Division, from 24 August 1943 to the moment of the breakthrough of the enemy fortified zone, displayed skillful command of the units of the division, which successfully advanced forward. During the offensive the division advanced up to 120 kilometers forward, during which it took several settlements, including Strekalovka, Popovka, Sinekino, the town of Rylsk, and the town of Putivl. The units of the division rapidly pushed forward, skillfully flanked the city from the northwest and west, assisting in the capture of the city of Rylsk, for this the division was designated Rylsk by order of the People's Commissar of Defense and division commander Comrade Gladkov commended.

During the offensive, units of the division took prisoner more than 200 soldiers and officers, took trophies - more than 600 rifles, 96 machine guns, 46 guns, 54 horses and other materiel. They wiped out up to 3,000 soldiers and officers, more than 1,000 rifles, 120 machine guns, 11 guns, one tank, one armored vehicle, 22 motor vehicles and other equipment. Units of the division continue to press the enemy and advance forward, wiping out the personnel and equipment of the enemy. For skillful organization of the breakthrough of the enemy fortified zone, for successful advance forward and skillful organization of combined arms cooperation, he is deserving of a state award: the Order of Suvorov, 2nd class.

For assisting in the taking of Korosten, the division was awarded the name of the town as a second honorific on 18 November. For performance in the Battle of the Dnieper, Kiryukhin recommended Gladkov for the Order of Lenin on 13 October, but this was downgraded to the Order of Suvorov 2nd class, which Gladkov was awarded on 17 October. The recommendation read:

The units of Comrade Gladkov from the day of the breakthrough of the strongly fortified zone of the enemy and pursuit of him further to the west and southwest took hundreds of settlements and the cities of Rylsk and Putivl.

Thanks to skillful command, and the maneuverability and efficiency of the units of Comrade Gladkov up to 1,800 kilometers of territory were liberated, destroying on the way the enemy's personnel and equipment, for which it was awarded the Order of the Red Banner.

On the approaches to the Dnieper river the units of Gladkov engaged the enemy and thanks to his skillful command, combined arms cooperation and quick maneuverability the enemy was thrown back to the western bank of the Dnieper in fighting and not holding there, forced to retreat to the Yasnogorodka region. The units of Comrade Gladkov in difficult battle conditions forced a crossing of the Dnieper river during half a day and quickly established themselves on the western bank of the Dnieper in the area of Yasnogorodka.

The enemy, desiring to return to his own previous positions, threw superior forces into the counterattack against the units of Comrade Gladkov, supported by large aviation forces, artillery, machine gun and submachine gun fire. But despite this, the units of Comrade Gladkov, thanks to steadfastness, fine training and skillful leadership, flanked and split up the forces of the enemy. All counterattacks were beaten back with heavy losses in personnel and equipment. During the battles the units of Comrade Gladkov destroyed: one self-propelled gun, 41 machine guns, fifteen gun, killed 557 horses, 3,837 soldiers and officers. Captured: twelve machine guns, one tank, two mortars, one gun. Taken prisoner: 25 soldiers and officers of the enemy.

For his skillful leadership, maneuverability, fine organization of the forcing of the Dnieper, inflicting of great losses in personnel and equipment on the enemy, skillful employment of equipment...he is deserving of the state award of the Order of Lenin.

From January 1944 the division, as part of the 13th Army, the division took part in the Zhitomir–Berdichev offensive, the Proskurov–Chernovitsy Offensive, the Rovno–Lutsk offensive, the fighting to eliminate the Lvov-Brody German grouping, the Lvov–Sandomierz offensive, and prolonged defensive battles on the Sandomierz bridgehead. For exemplary fulfillment of command tasks the division received the Order of Suvorov, 2nd class, on 7 February 1944 and the Order of the Red Banner on 9 August. Gladkov was recommended for the Order of the Red Banner by 27th Rifle Corps commander Filipp Cherokmanov on 24 July, which was awarded that day. The recommendation read:

The 112th Rifle Division, under the command of Major General Gladkov, broke through the strongly fortified and deeply echeloned defense of the enemy on 13 July and took prisoner about 1500 and wiped out about 7,000 soldiers and officers of the enemy, liberating 200 settlements, including the town of Zhulkev. In the region of Kamenka Strumilova, the 112th Rifle Division, thanks to the skillful command of Major General Gladkov, encircled and wiped out a large group of the enemy.

For his skillful command of the division, for the breakthrough of the fortified zone of the enemy, and for inflicting significant losses in personnel and equipment on the enemy, Major General Gladkov is deserving of the award of the Order of the Red Banner.

The division attacked out of the Sandomierz bridgehead on 12 January 1945 at the start of the Sandomierz–Silesian offensive of the larger Vistula–Oder strategic offensive, breaking through the German defenses west of Kurozvenki and pursuing the retreating German troops. Its units forced crossings of the Black Nida, Biebrza, Pilitsa, and Varta. On 26 January the division forward detachment crossed the Oder, took a bridgehead and held it until the main forces came up. While moving to the Oder crossing, Gladkov and his chief of the operations department were seriously wounded when the division command vehicle was hit during a German bombing raid on 27 January. Gladkov lost his leg and was evacuated to the army hospital. This was his third serious wound of the war. He was recommended for the Order of Bogdan Khmelnitsky, 2nd class by Cherokmanov on 22 January. This was upgraded to the title Hero of the Soviet Union and the Order of Lenin, which Gladkov was awarded on 6 April 1945. The recommendation read:

Major General Gladkov, during the breakthrough of strongly fortified and deeply echeloned enemy defenses, west of Sandomir, correctly developed a plan to break through the defenses, skillfully led units of the division to the moment of the breakthrough and subsequent pursuit of the enemy. Under the command of Major General Gladkov, units of the division fought their way through up to 250 kilometers, forced crossings of the water obstacles of the rivers Bobzha, Charna-Nida, Varta, and Pilitsa. They took 238 settlements and towns. They captured 191 and wiped out 1,280 soldiers and officers of the enemy, destroyed 33 tanks, captured six, 51 guns, 183 machine guns, 47 vehicles, and 21 armored vehicles. Together with units of the corps the 112th Rifle Division under the command of General Gladkov destroyed the 16th and 17th Panzer Divisions of the enemy.

For skillful and courageous command of the division Major General Gladkov is deserving of the award of the Order of Bogdan Khmelnitsky 2nd class.

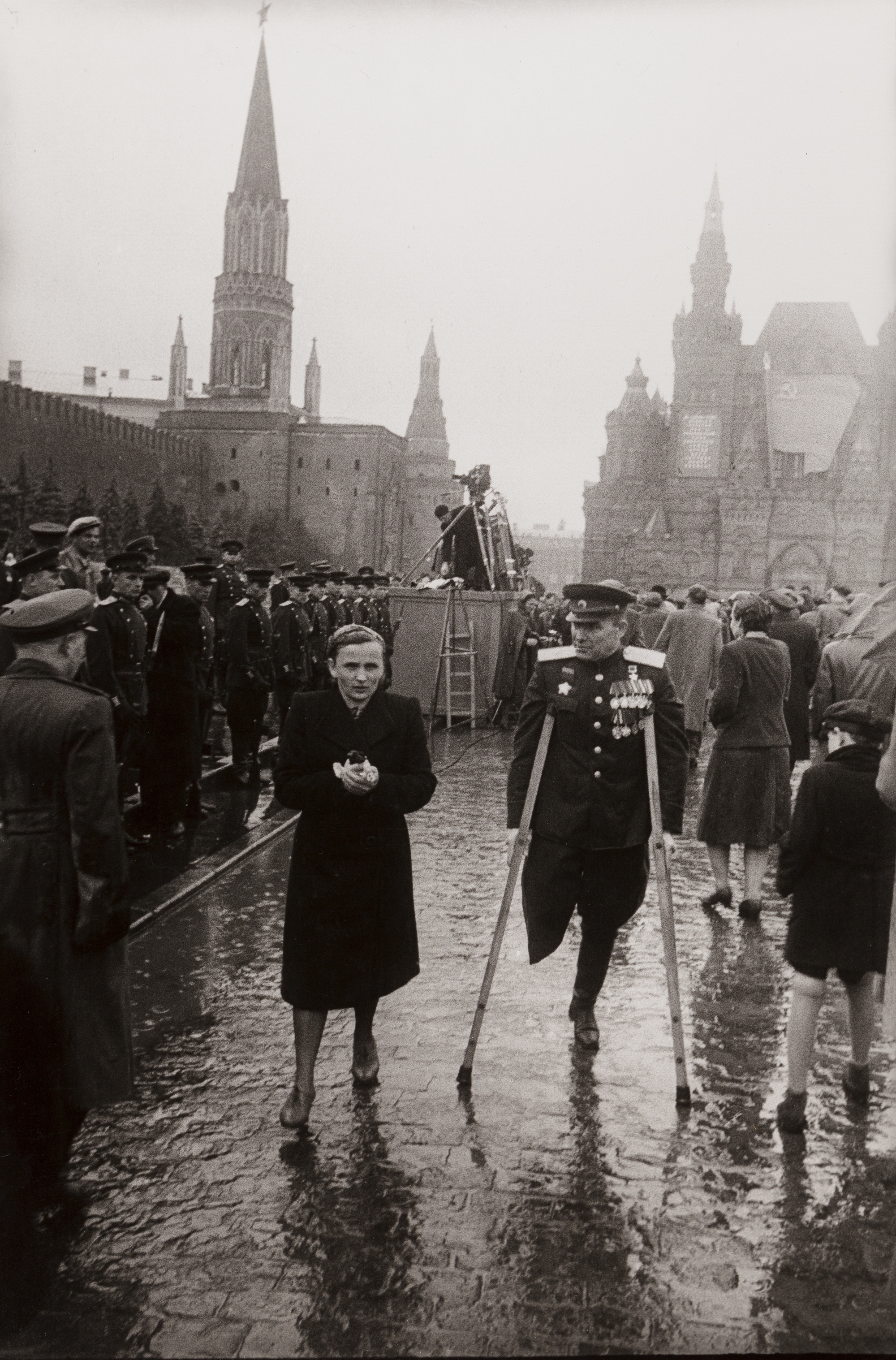
Gladkov and his wife at the Moscow Victory Parade

Gladkov and his wife Vera Potapovna attended the 1945 Moscow Victory Parade on 24 June, where photographer Yevgeny Khaldei took a photograph of them titled "The Joy and Pain of Victory".

== Postwar ==
After the end of the war, Gladkov was discharged from the hospital in January 1946, then placed at the disposal of the Main Cadre Directorate. He was appointed chief of the Automobile Depot of the Ground Forces in August of that year. The depot provided vehicles for the senior leadership of the People's Commissariat for the Armed Forces. Gladkov was transferred to the reserve on 30 December 1952. He lived and worked in Moscow, where he died on 3 April 1969.

== Awards ==
Gladkov was a recipient of the following decorations and awards:

- Hero of the Soviet Union
- Order of Lenin (2)
- Order of the Red Banner (6)
- Order of Suvorov, 2nd class
- Medals
