= Horodnytsia, Zhytomyr Oblast =

Rural locality in Zhytomyr Oblast, Ukraine

Horodnytsia Городниця
- Rural settlement
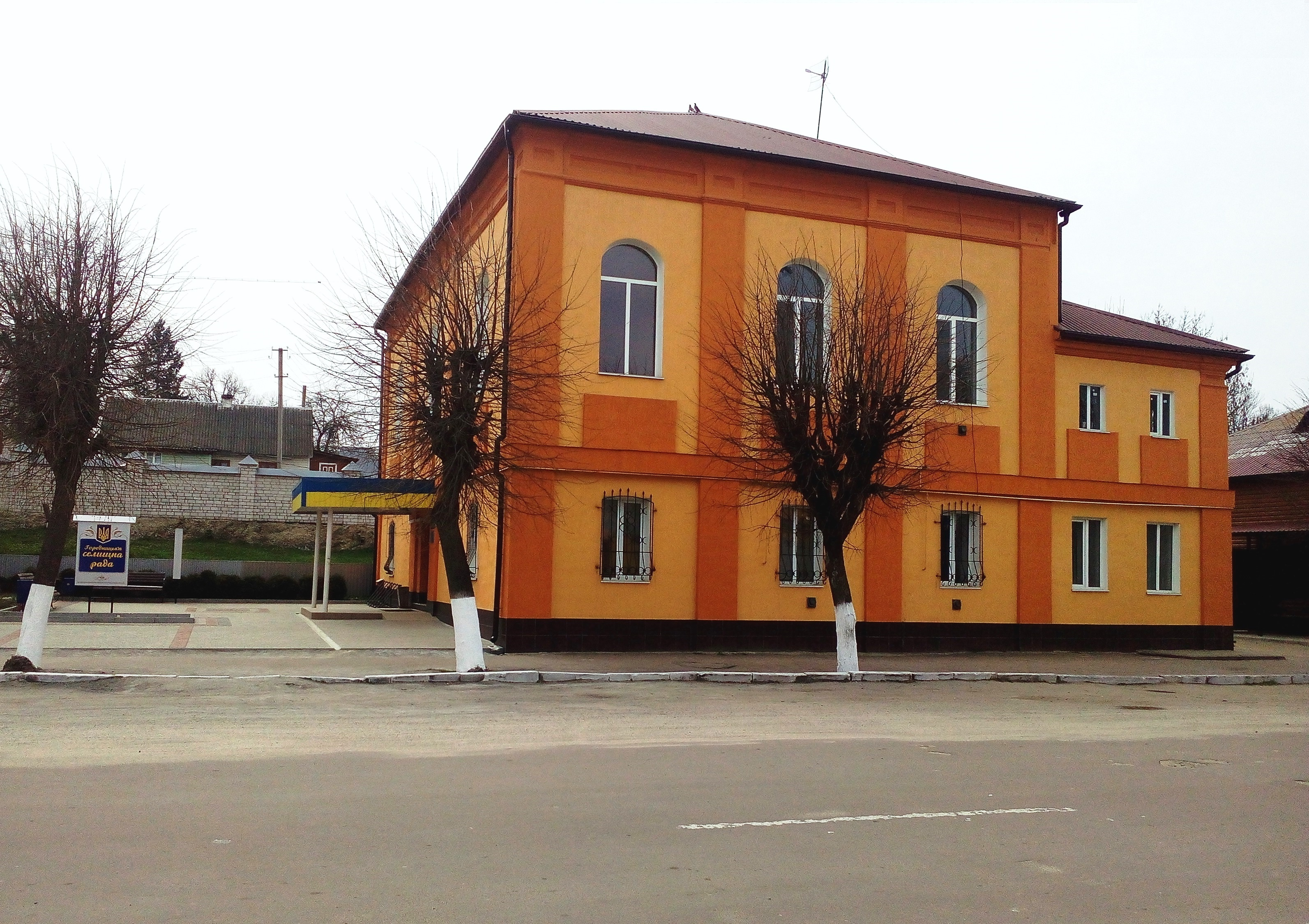
- Town hall, formerly a synagogue

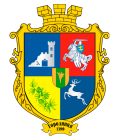
- Coat of arms

- Location in Ukraine Horodnytsia (Ukraine)
- Coordinates: 50°48′23″N 27°18′52″E
- Country: Ukraine
- Oblast: Zhytomyr Oblast
- Raion: Novohrad-Volynskyi Raion
- First mentioned: 1127
- Current status: 10 December 1938

Area
  - Total: 6.637 km^{2} (2.563 sq mi)
- Elevation: 198 m (650 ft)

Population (2022)
  - Total: 5,207
  - Density: 804.6/km^{2} (2,084/sq mi)
- Time zone: UTC+2 (EET)
  - Summer (DST): UTC+3 (EEST)
- Postal code: 11714
- Area code: +380 4141
- Vehicle registration: AM, KM
- Climate: Dfb
- Website: www.gorodnycka-gromada.gov.ua

Horodnytsia (Ukrainian: Городниця) is a rural settlement on the Sluch river in Zhytomyr Oblast, Ukraine. Population: 5,207 (2022 estimate)

== History ==
Horodnytsia was first mentioned in 1685, when it was a town. It was an important trade center with a porcelain factory established in 1799.

Horodnytsia is well known for the Horodnytsia St. George’s Monastery. A wooden church dedicated to St. George was built here in the 18th century, followed by a masonry church built in 1903.

The Jewish community was established in the first half of the 19th century. There were two synagogues in 1863 and five by the end of the century. During the German occupation, 21 Jews were shot on July 19, 1941; the remaining Jewish population was murdered in the autumn of 1941.

During Soviet times it served as a district centre. In 1926 the settlement had 2,700 inhabitants. In 2001 the population was 5,604.

Until 26 January 2024, Horodnytsia was designated urban-type settlement. On this day, a new law entered into force which abolished this status, and Horodnytsia became a rural settlement.

== Economy ==
Historically, Horodnytsia hosted a porcelain manufacture and several sawmills.

== Gallery ==
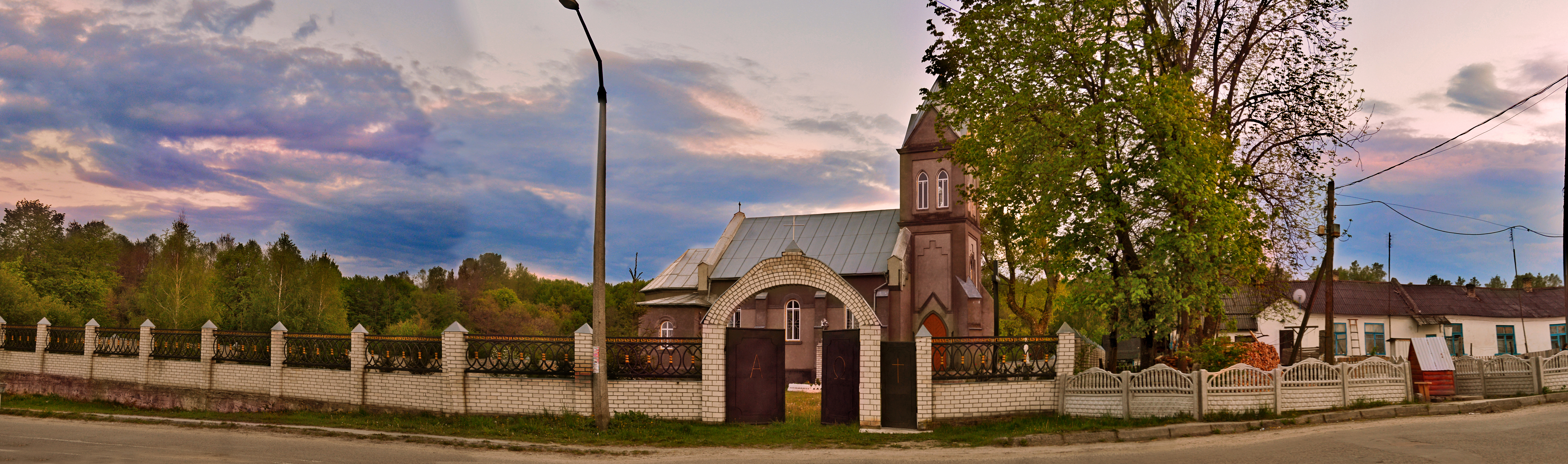
St. Anthony Catholic Church

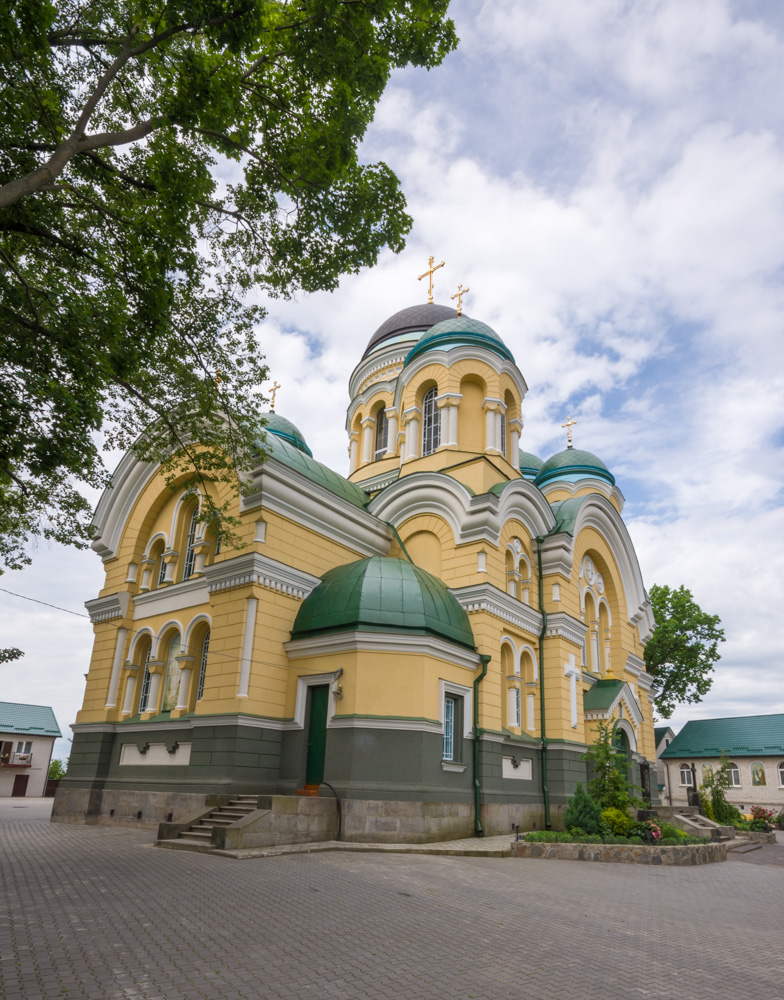
Saint George's Church
