= October Revolution Day =

Public holiday in the Soviet Union

Day of the Great October Socialist Revolution День Великой Октябрьской социалистической революции
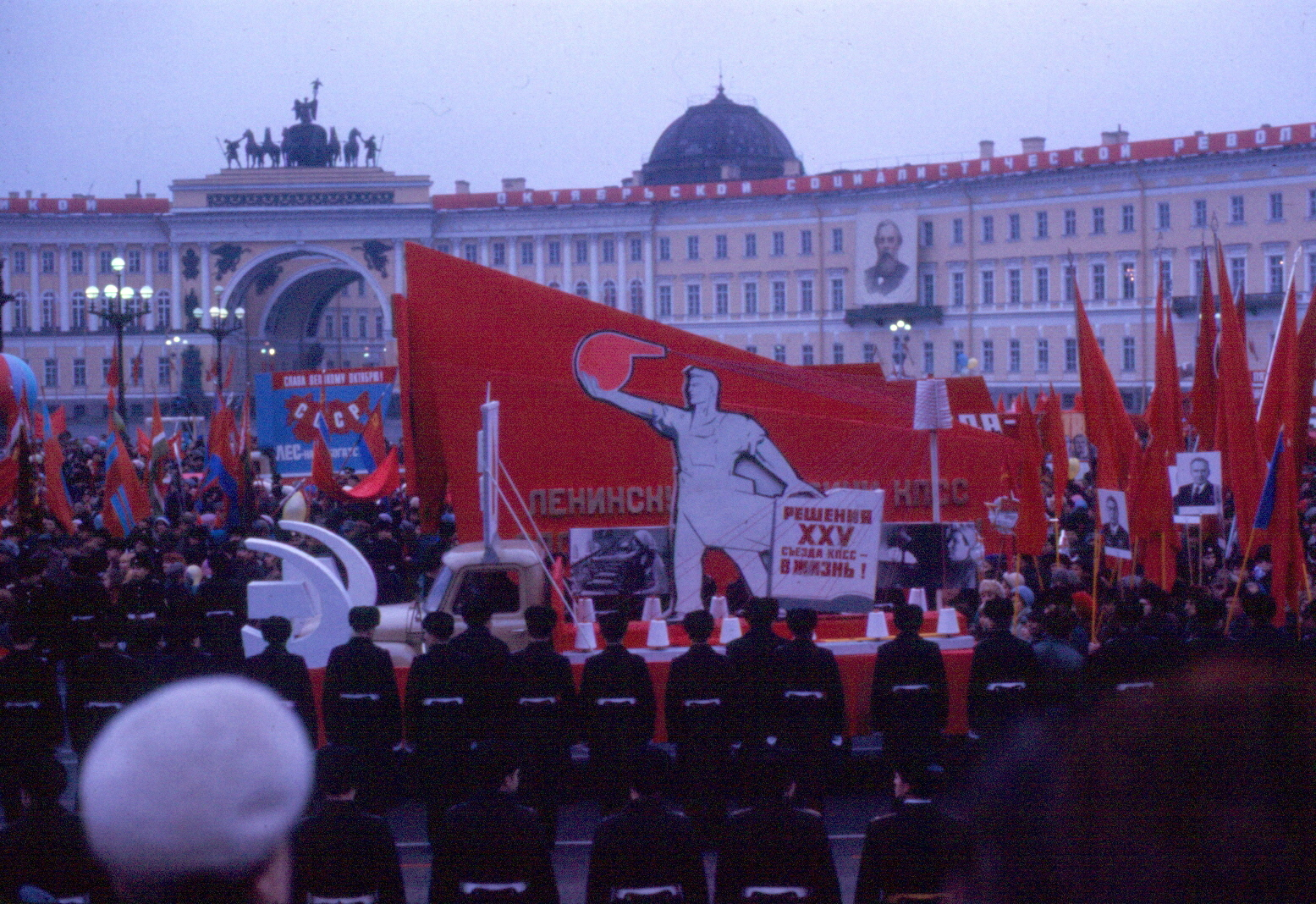
- October Revolution Day in Leningrad, 1976
- Observed by: originated from Soviet Russia→Soviet Union (1918–1991) Belarus (since 1995) Formerly observed by: Bulgaria Cuba Czechoslovakia Democratic People's Republic of Korea Ethiopia Finland (unofficial) East Germany Hungary India (unofficial) Kyrgyzstan Mongolia Poland Romania Vietnam
- Type: National Day
- Celebrations: Flag hoisting, parades, public demonstrations, fireworks, award ceremonies, singing patriotic songs and the national anthem, speeches by the CPSU General Secretary, entertainment and cultural programs
- Date: 7 November
- Next time: 7 November 2026
- Frequency: annual
- Related to: Great October Socialist Revolution

October Revolution Day (officially Day of the Great October Socialist Revolution, Russian: День Великой Октябрьской социалистической революции) was a public holiday in the Soviet Union and other Soviet-aligned states, officially observed on November 7 from 1927 to 1990, commemorating the 1917 October Revolution.

For Soviet families, it was a holiday tradition to partake in a shared morning meal, and to watch the October Revolution Parade broadcast on Soviet Central Television.

A holiday canon was established during the Stalinist period, and included a workers' demonstration, the appearance of leaders on the podium of the Mausoleum, and, finally, the military parade on Red Square, which was held unfailingly every year (bar the years 1942-45), and most famously in 1941, as the Axis forces were advancing on Moscow.

== Soviet observances ==
=== Civil-military parade ===
==== History ====
The 20th anniversary parade in 1937.

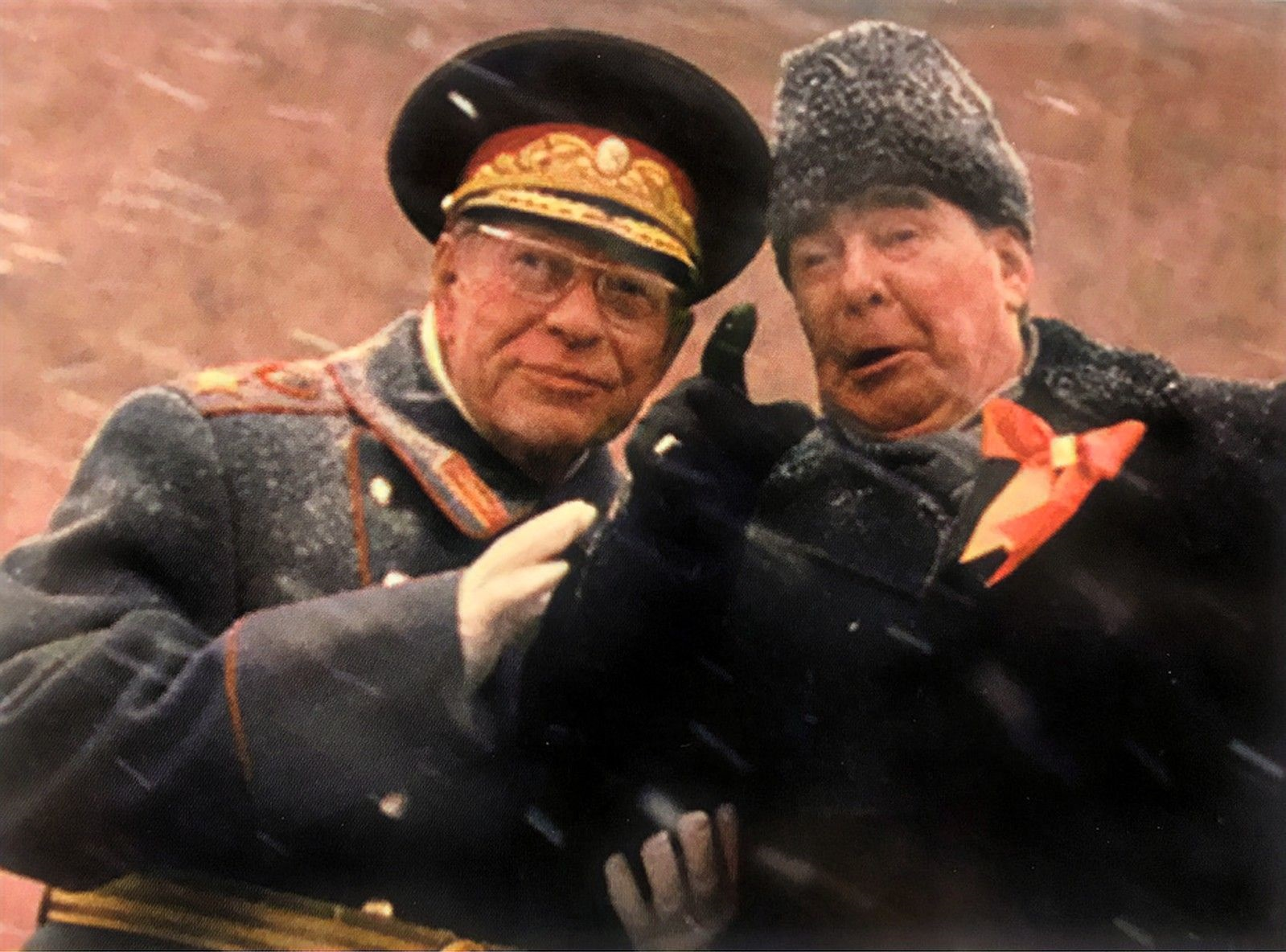
Leonid Brezhnev and Dmitry Ustinov at the 1979 Revolution Day Parade celebrating the 62nd anniversary of the revolution.

The first military parade took place on 7 November 1919 on the second anniversary of the revolution. The Russian civil war lasted until 1923. The parade in 1941 is particularly revered as it took place during the Battle of Moscow, during which many of the soldiers on the parade would be killed in action. In 1953, the parade took place as the first one to not be inspected by officers on horseback. The practice of foreign leaders began in 1957 with Mao Zedong attending that year's parade as part of a state visit, continuing throughout the next two decades with Ethiopian leader Mengistu Haile Mariam's attendance in 1980 and the leaders of Warsaw Pact and USSR-allied nations in 1967, 1977 and 1987. The 1989 parade was the first to have a drill routine by the massed bands take place. During the final parade in 1990, an assassination attempt was made on the life of President Mikhail Gorbachev by Alexander Shmonov, a locksmith from Leningrad. The two bullets he fired missed as he was tackled to the ground by crowds of demonstrators. The only time that a Soviet leader never attended a parade was in 1983 when Yuri Andropov did not attend the parade due to a sickness and his associate Konstantin Chernenko stood in for him.

==== Description of the parade ====
The most important event of the holiday is the national military parade and demonstrations on Moscow's Red Square, with members of the Politburo and the Central Committee of the Communist Party of the Soviet Union acting as the guests of honor. The celebrations begin at 9:50 am Moscow Standard Time with the arrival honors for the commander of the parade, who is greeted by the commandant of the Frunze Military Academy (now the Combined Arms Academy of the Armed Forces of the Russian Federation) usually a general officer, and receives the report on the parade's status. Once the parade commander (who is usually a Colonel General with the billet of Commander of the Moscow Military District) receives the report, he takes his position in the parade and orders the formations to stand at ease. A couple minutes later, a Communist Party and government delegation arrives at the grandstand on top of Lenin's Mausoleum. The dignitaries include the General Secretary, Premier, the Chairman of the Presidium of the Supreme Soviet, members of the entire Central Committee of the Communist Party of the Soviet Union, including members from the Politburo and Secretariat, the Chief of the General Staff of the Armed Forces, service branch commanders, deputy defence ministers, members of the cabinet and commanders of the support departments in the general staff, in addition to the occasional foreign head of state or party as the principal foreign guest and reviewing officer. In between the south of the grandstand is a platoon of the armed linemen and markers from the Independent Commandant's Regiment in military overcoats whose purpose is to take post to mark the distance of the troops marching past. Seated in the stands on the west and east sides were residents of the capital, visitors from all over the Union, the diplomatic corps and military attaches and guests from allied and friendly countries with ties to the Union government. Within Red Square the more than 9,000 strong parade formation (11,000 during jubilee years) was complemented by the Massed Bands of the Moscow Garrison, conducted by the Senior Director of Music of the Military Band Service of the Armed Forces, the billet of an officer who usually held major general rank, at the start of the parade the bands were split into four sections across the expanse of the Square in between the inspecting formations. The mobile column, also present, was made up of around 170-380 vehicles and around 3,900 crews drawn from the participant units making up the segment of the parade. Until 1974 the mobile column was around 400 to 750 vehicles strong made up of around 7,500 to 9,800 crews and officers from the formations making up the column.

===== Badges =====
In November 1967 Minister of Defense Marshal Andrei Grechko announced his gratitude and of the Ministry of Defence to all those who marched on Red Square that 7 November as the country marked the golden jubilee anniversary year of the Revolution and for the first time, together with the text of gratitude, they were presented with commemorative badges "Participant of the military parade". Participants were also awarded a commemorative badge in the 1972 parade, the 100th parade to mark the golden jubilee of the foundation of the Soviet Union. A number of naval schools had custom made badges made in honor of their participation in the celebrations.

==== Parade proper ====
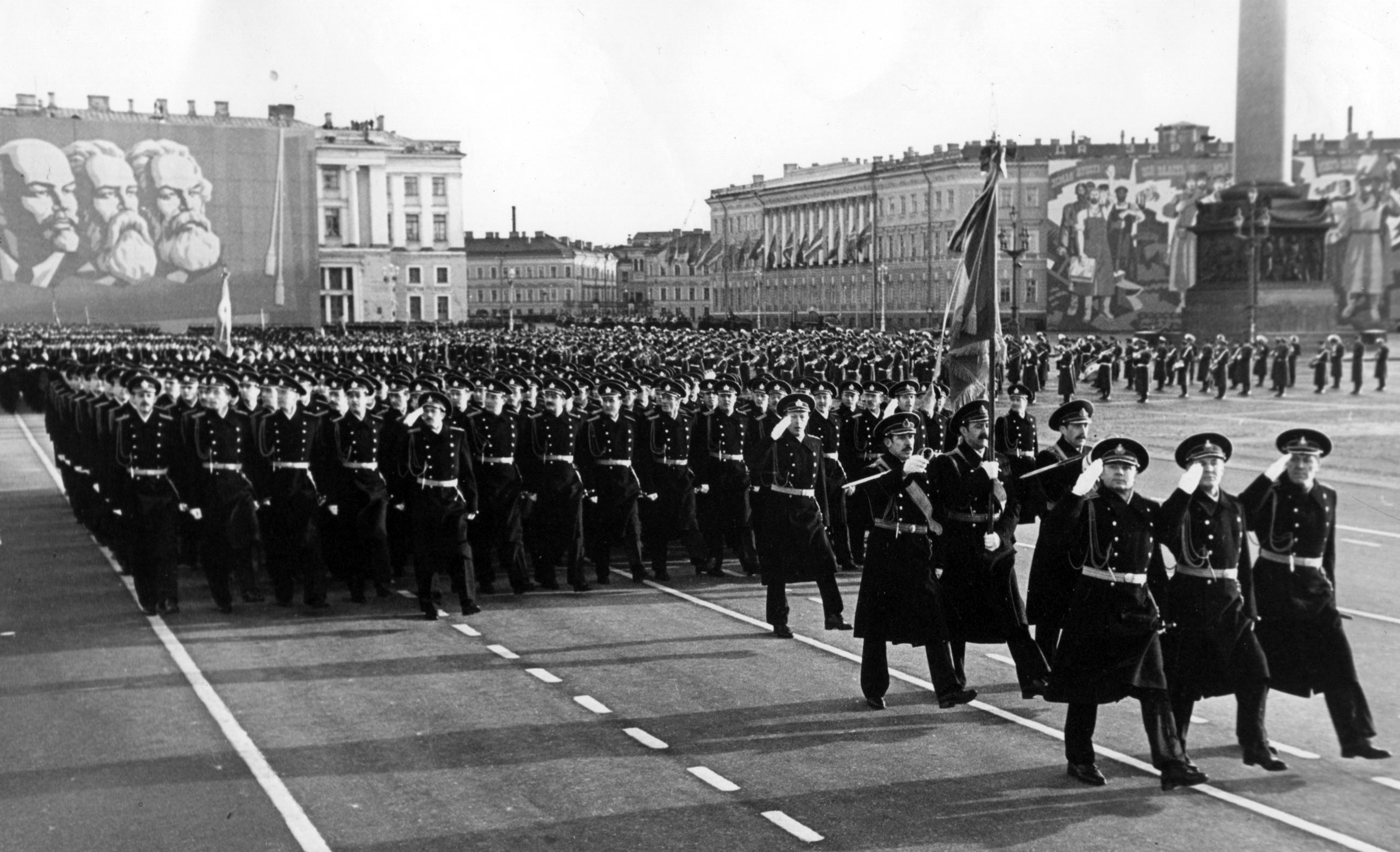
The Leningrad parade in 1983.

As the Kremlin's Spasskaya Tower sounds the chimes at 10am the parade commander orders the parade to present arms and look to the left for inspection. The Minister of Defence (usually a billet of a General of the Army) then is driven on a limousine to the center of the square to receive the parade report from the commander, with the combined bands playing Jubillee March of the Red Army in the background. Once the report is received, the Minister and the parade commander begin to inspect the parading formations together with the bands. The limousinesed stop at each formation in order for the minister to send his greeting to the contingents, in which they respond with a threefold "Ura" (Russian: Ура). Other than the Red Square inspection, the commander and the minister would also inspect the personnel of the mobile column on Manezhnaya Square. After the final greeting, the Massed Bands played Long Live our State by Boris Alexandrovich Alexandrov as the commander returns to his place in the parade, and the Minister driven to the grandstand while the entire parade shouts 'Ura!' (Russian: Ура!) repeatedly until he takes his position in the grandstand and the bands end playing (from 1945 to 1966 Slavsya from A Life for the Tsar took its place and yet again in 1990). During this time, the Corps of Drums of the Moscow Military Music College, which is an affiliate of the Suvorov Military Schools, take their place behind the parade commander's limousine. The parade is then ordered to stand at ease and the chromatic fanfare trumpeters, together with the rest of the musicians of the massed bands, sound a fanfare call, usually Govovin's Moscow Fanfare for the keynote address by the minister which will follow. As the minister concludes his address, he will yell "Ura!" (Russian: "Ура!") to which the entire parade repeats thrice. The Massed Bands of the Moscow Garrison then play the full version of the State Anthem of the Soviet Union while a ceremonial battery armed with the 76 mm divisional gun M1942 (ZiS-3) fire a 21-gun salute. As the anthem ends, the bands sound a second fanfare and the parade commander orders the parade to do carry out the following commands for the march past:

Parade... attention! Ceremonial march past!
Form battalions! Distance by a single lineman! First battalion will remain in the right, remainder... left.. turn!
Slope.. arms!
Eyes to the right...
Quick march!

On the command "Quick march!", the linemen take their places at the south end of the square while the Corps of Drums of the Moscow Military Music College march to a drum tune, while the fifers and trumpeters play a specific tune, in a tradition that would go on until the late 1990s and early 2000s when the trumpets were removed. As the massed bands start playing the Corps of Drums begin to swing their drumsticks while on the eyes right led by the drum major. The Corps is immediately followed by the officers of the Frunze Military Academy whereas on jubilee parades, the massed colour guard is the first formation other than the corps on the square, followed by a historical contingent. The troops have always marched in the following order during the parade:

===== Order of ground march past column =====
Military Bands

- Massed Bands of the Moscow Military District under the direction of the Senior Director of Music of the Bands Service
- Corps of Drums of the Moscow Military Music College

Ground Column

- Parade commander holding the appointment of commanding officer of the Moscow Military District
- Color Guard Unit (in jubilee parades)
- Historical contingent (in jubilee parades)
  - Red Guards
  - Ex-Imperial Russian Army servicemen within the Red Army
  - Sailors of the Aurora
  - Red Army soldiers during the Civil War
  - Great Patriotic War contingent
- Frunze Military Academy
- V.I. Lenin Military Political Academy
- Felix Dzerzhinsky Artillery Academy
- Military Armored Forces Academy Marshal Rodion Malinovsky
- Military Engineering Academy
- Military Academy of Chemical Defense and Control
- Yuri Gagarin Air Force Academy
- Prof. Nikolai Zhukovsky Air Force Engineering Academy
- Delegation of naval officer cadets from the Soviet Navy
- 98th Guards Airborne Division
- Moscow Border Guards Institute of the Border Defence Forces of the KGB "Moscow City Council"
- Separate Operational Purpose Division
- 336th Marine Brigade of the Baltic Fleet
- Suvorov Military School
- Nakhimov Naval School
- Moscow Military Combined Arms Command Training School "Supreme Soviet of the Russian SFSR"

As ground column concludes, the massed bands play either Long Live our State or Song of the Motherland, with the Moscow Higher Military Command School marching past as the last formation on the square before the mobile column with Victory Day being played beforehand as their cadets march at the rear. When the ground segment ends, the bands perform an about turn and march towards the facade of the GUM department store to give way to the mobile column, which drives past as the bands play Victorious March and Moscow Salute. Once the ground mobile column is complete, the bands take their position at the western end of the square to prepare for the finale, led by the senior director of music, conductors, bandmasters and drum majors. The finale involves the massed bands marching down the square to the tune of Song of the Soviet Army or Metropolitan March and as the bands march past the grandstand, the senior director of music, conductors and bandmasters salute at the eyes right. In 1967, the massed bands marched out to the tune of My Beloved Motherland.

===== Order of mobile column drivepast =====
- 2nd Guards Motor Rifle Division
- 98th Guards Airborne Division
- 4th Guards Tank Division
- Moscow Military District Field Artillery and Rocket Forces
- Moscow Military District Ground Forces Air Defense
- 1st Moscow Air and Air Defense Forces Army
- Northern Fleet and Baltic Fleet Coastal Defense, Surface and Submarine Forces (until 1974)
- Strategic Missile Forces 27th Guards Rocket Army

Similar parade events were held in all major cities in the RSFSR as well as in the USSR, with the first secretary of the local communist party branch being the guest of honor and the commander of the regional military district or large formation acting as the parade inspector and keynote speaker, while the second-in command of the unit or command served as parade commander. The parade format is the same in these cities, with particularities being shaped to fit the specific parade ground (e.g. October Square, Minsk). Massed bands for the parade were drawn from the formation or district bands located in their respective areas. The Government of the Armenian SSR cancelled the 1989 parade in Yerevan due to extended protests, while the mobile column of the parade in the Moldovan capital of Kishinev was removed from the itinerary due to protester blocking the streets and preventing passage to vehicles. A similar occurred event occurred on what is now Gediminas Avenue in Vilnius.

==== Civil parade and workers' demonstration ====
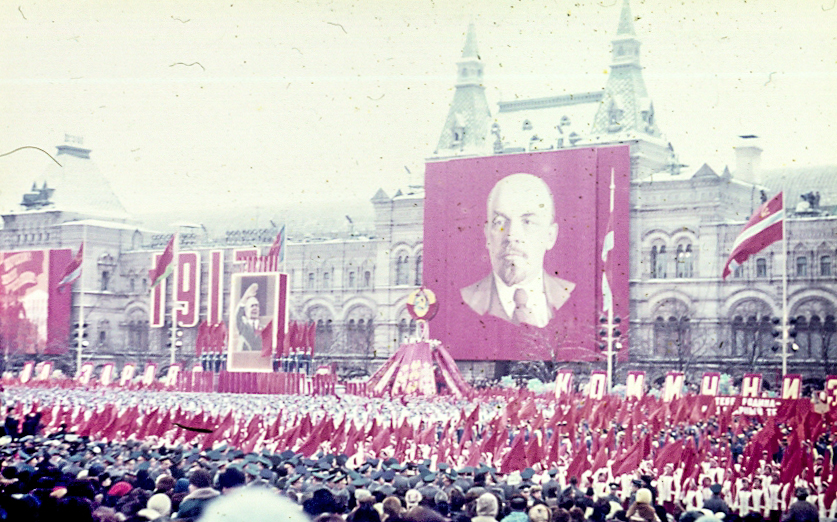
Workers demonstration in Moscow in 1977

The bands having marched off the square is the signal for the commencement of the holiday civil parade and workers' demonstration in Red Square. In jubilee years (more frequency in the parades of the 1960s and 1970s), the civil parade kicks off with a spectacular march made up of the following components preceding the workers' demonstration march:

- Red flag bearers
- Historical segment (present in the parades of 1967 and 1987)
- Officials, management, staff and employees of the Moscow City CPSU Committee and Moscow City Council
- Representatives of state economic enterprises and firms in Moscow
- Komsomol
- Vladimir Lenin All-Union Pioneer Organization
- DOSAAF
- Color Guard, Athletes and Coaches from the Voluntary Sports Societies of the Soviet Union
- Moscow National Central Physical Fitness and Sports School

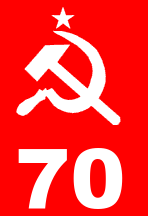
The logo of the 1987 celebrations.

Float displays also featured prominently in the civil parades where floats were designed to promote government and party campaigns or highlight the works of various public companies, farm collectives and state economic firms. At a certain point during the civil parade, Pioneers in winter jackets and carrying flowers representing schools in Moscow and all over the country run towards the front of the Mausoleum facade and are split into two groups that ascend the staircases towards the dignitaries in the grandstand to give them flower bouquets. Following the civil parade the workers' demonstration officially begins, wherein workers from state economic and social firms in Moscow, as well as from schools and universities, march past as part of their respective community delegations. Each delegation has a color guard unit and brass band taking part, as well as floats from the participating state enterprises. Each of Moscow's districts march past the grandstand to greet everyone a Happy Revolution Day, especially to the dignitaries and everyone in the stands watching as balloons fly out from the crowds filing past while recorded music is played on the speakers. After an hour or two, the civil parade ends with a huge crowd bidding the principal dignitaries farewell from the grounds of the square with red flags in their hands as one final cheer resounds from the sound systems installed along the entire length of the square.

Similar civil parades occurred in all major cities and the republican capital cities following the military parades.

== Post-Soviet observance ==
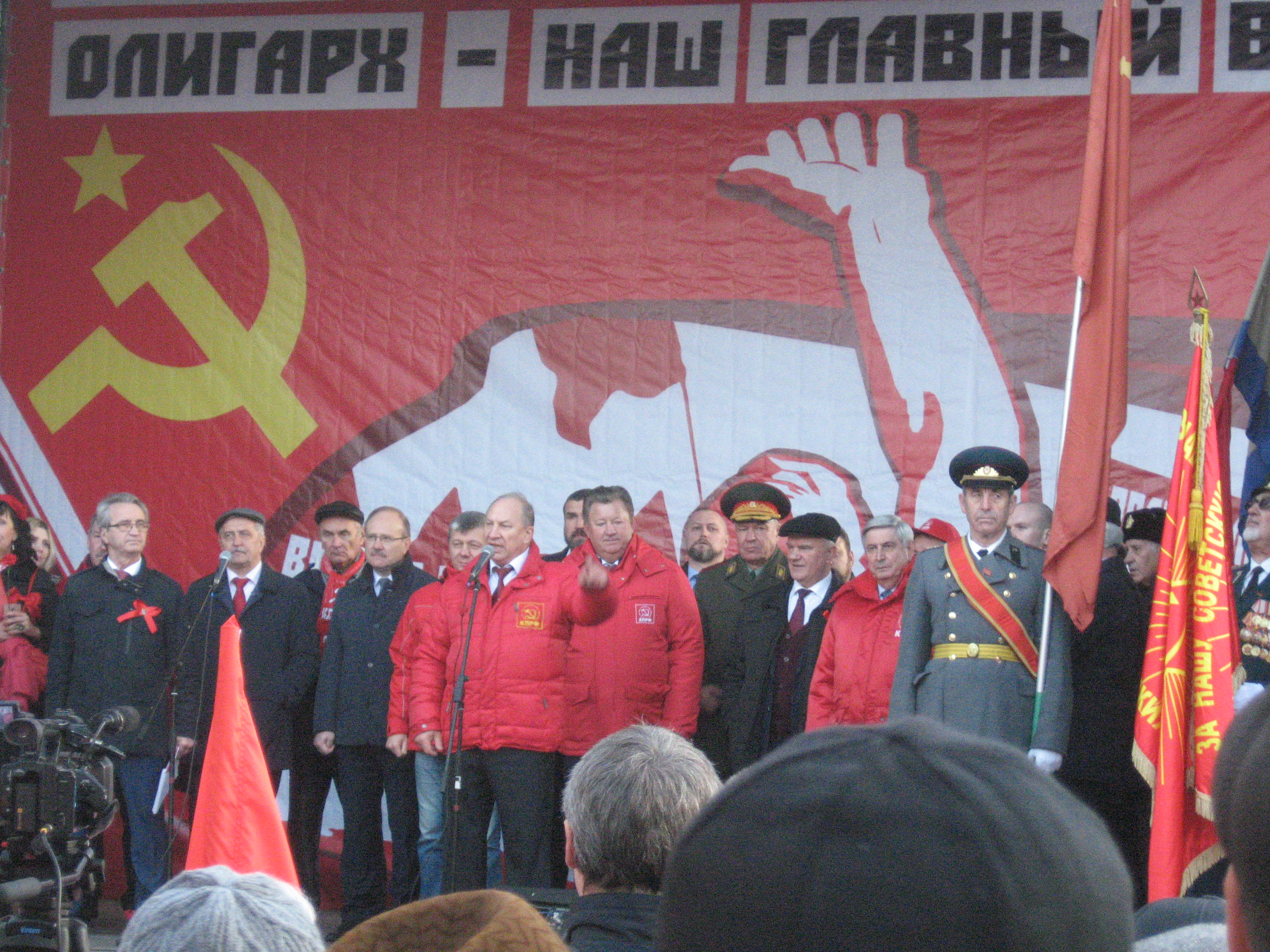
CPRF celebrations in 2009.

In Russia, the holiday was repurposed several times. In 1995, President Yeltsin reestablished a November 7 holiday to commemorate the liberation of Moscow from the Polish-Lithuanian Army in 1612. The next year, it was renamed 'Day of Accord and Reconciliation'. From 2004, November 7 became one of several Days of Military Honour and ceased to be a day off. The original celebrations continues to be honoured in ceremonies led by the Communist Party of the Russian Federation.

As of 2018, October Revolution Day remains an official holiday in Belarus, though the original significance has faded and it is simply regarded as a day off. President Alexander Lukashenko has described the holiday as one that "strengthens social harmony". Similarly, in the unrecognized Pridnestrovian Transnistrian Republic, the day is officially a public holiday, but it is regarded by locals as devoid of its original meaning. In Kyrgyzstan, the holiday was observed until 2017, when it was replaced by the 'Days of Ancestral History and Memory' on November 7 and 8.

== Observance in the United States ==
A handful of U.S. states designate November 7 as Victims of Communism Day. In 2022, the state of Florida in the United States, mandated that schools devote 45 minutes to teaching about communism, the role that communist leaders have had on history and how people suffered under those regimes.

== See also ==
- Declaration of the Creation of the Union of Soviet Socialist Republics
- List of October Revolution Parades in Moscow
- Victory Day (9 May)
- Golden Week (China)
- National Day of the People's Republic of China
