= 2014 Moscow Victory Day Parade =

Russian military parade

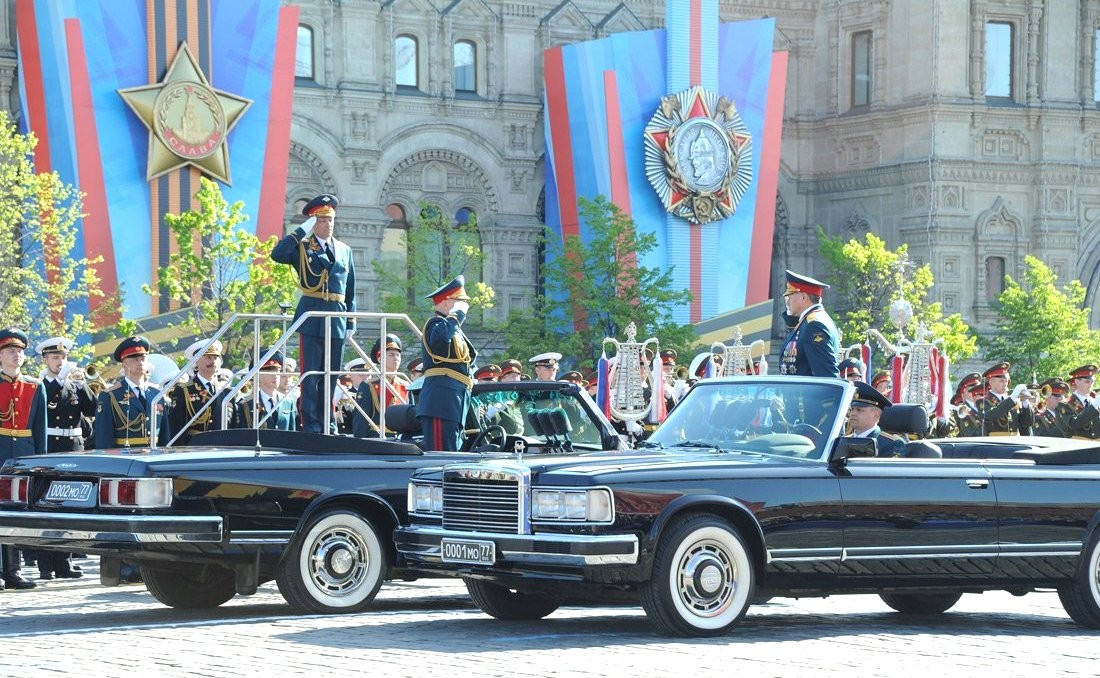
Colonel General Salykov Reporting to Minister of Defense Shoygu during the parade.

The 2014 Moscow Victory Day Parade took place in Red Square on 9 May 2014 to commemorate the 69th anniversary of the capitulation of Nazi Germany in 1945, which formally ended hostilities in the Second World War in Europe. The annual parade marks the Allied victory in the Great Patriotic War on the same day as the signing of the German act of capitulation to the Allies in Berlin, at midnight of May 9, 1945 (Russian time). President of Russia Vladimir Putin delivered his eleventh holiday address to the nation on this day.

== Parade specifics ==
Members of the Presidential Cavalry Squadron of the Kremlin Regiment took part in the part to honour the contributions of the Red Army Cavalry Corps Joining the parade for the first time were the cadets of the Tver Suvorov Military School and the Kronstadt Sea Cadet Corps. In the mobile column, the Tor-M2U air-defense missile systems, the 9M123 Khrizantema tracked tank destroyers and Typhoon-K APCs were also seen. This year's mobile column had a record 149 military vehicles in attendance, with 69 planes (including for the very first time 4 Yak-130s from a newly formed air aerobatics group, the "tactical air wing" formation by pilots from the Lipetsk State Aviation Center and also for the first time, in a late addition to compensate for the absences of the Russian Knights and Swifts aerobatics teams that were in Sevastopol, four brand-new Mil Mi-35s) forming the fly-past.

Minister of Defense of the Russian Federation General of the Army Sergey Shoigu inspected the parade for the second time, and this year's parade commander was the Deputy Chief of the General Staff of the Russian Armed Forces, Colonel General Oleg Salyukov.

=== Preparation ===
Beginning in November/December 2013, preparations for the parade were well attended at the unit level. Individual unit practices were held in the various military installations for all the participating units. Full-scale rehearsals officially started on March 31, 2014, in the Alabino training grounds in Moscow Oblast, with the rehearsals there to formally conclude in April the same year in order to prepare for the practice runs in Moscow's Red Square in May. Also rehearsing for the parade are the massed military bands of the Armed Forces and the Moscow Garrison, all to be conducted for the 12th straight year by Lieutenant General Valery Khalilov, the Senior Director of Music of the Bands Service of the Russian Armed Forces, and the units and vehicles forming the mobile column. Practice runs for the Russian Knights and Swifts air aerobatics teams that formed part of the fly past column commenced on April 6, 2014. A first general practice run (without the flypast) was held in the Alabino grounds on April 7, 2014, with another run finished on the 11th.

April 16, 2014 saw the first joint practice run of the parade at the Alabino grounds including the fly past column for the first time. Also found joining the parade for the first time in 4 years was the 1st Cavalry Squadron from the Presidential Cavalry Escort Battalion, Kremlin Regiment. The Moscow leg of the practice runs commenced on April 21, 2014 with the mobile column driving its way along Tverskaya Street for its first practice run in the capital. This was followed by the first night practice runs on Red Square itself, joined by the bands, the marching troops and the mobile column, which began on April 29 to 30.

The air flypast column held a practice run above the skies of Moscow on May 3, 2014. All 69 planes joining this year's parade took part, and the run-through was cheered on by both Muscovites and tourists alike. A final nighttime practice run was held on May 5 on Moscow's Red Square. And on May 7, despite the cold weather earlier that day, a final parade practice run was held that morning at 10AM Moscow Time, with General of the Army Shoigu inspecting and with Colonel General Salyukov leading the contingents, just as they would have done in the actual parade.

== Full order of the parade ==
Bold indicates first appearance, italic indicates multiple appearances, Bold and italic indicate returning appearance, all indicated unless otherwise noted.

- General of the Army Sergey Shoigu, Minister of Defense of the Russian Federation (parade inspector)
- **Colonel General Oleg Salyukov, Commander-in-Chief of the Russian Ground Forces** (parade commander)

=== Military Bands ===
- Massed Military Bands of the Armed Forces under the direction of the Senior Director of Music of the Military Bands Service of the Armed Forces of the Russian Federation, Lieutenant General Valery Khalilov
- Corps of Drums of the Moscow Military Music School

=== Ground Column ===
- 154th Preobrazhensky Independent Commandant's Regiment Colour Guard and Honour Guard Company of the 1st Honor Guard Battalion, 154th PICR
- **Presidential Cavalry Escort Battalion, Kremlin Regiment** (returning)
- Suvorov Military School (first appearance for the Tver branch)
- Nakhimov Naval School
- **Kronstadt Sea Cadet Corps** (first appearance)
- Aksanskiy Cossack Cadet Corps
- Combined Arms Academy of the Armed Forces of the Russian Federation
- Military University of the Ministry of Defence of the Russian Federation
- Military Academy of Material and Technical Security "General of the Army A. V. Khrulev"
- Zhukovsky – Gagarin Air Force Academy
- **Baltic Naval Military Institute "Admiral Fyodor Ushakov"** (returning)
- **382nd Independent Marine Battalion of the Black Sea Fleet** (first appearance)
- 336th Independent Guards Biaystok Marine Brigade of the Baltic Fleet
- Military Space Academy "Alexander Mozhaysky"
- **Peter the Great Military Academy of the Strategic Missile Forces** (returning)
- Ryazan Guards Higher Airborne Command School "Gen. of the Army Vasily Margelov"'
- 98th Guards Airborne Division
- 1st NBC Coastal Brigade
- 9th Chemical Disposal Regiment
- 29th and 38th Independent Railway Brigades of the Russian Railway Troops
- **16th Spetsnaz Brigade, Western Military District** (returning)
- ODON Ind. Motorized Internal Troops Division of the Ministry of Internal Affairs of the Russian Federation "Felix Dzerzhinsky"
- Civil Defense Academy of the Ministry of Emergency Situations
- Moscow Border Guards Institute of the Border Guard Service of the Federal Security Service of the Russian Federation "Moscow City Council"
- 2nd Guards Tamanskaya Motor Rifle Division "Mikhail Kalinin"
- 4th Guards Kantemirovskaya Tank Division "Yuri Andropov"
- Military Technical University of the Federal Agency of Special Construction
- Moscow Military Commanders Training School "Supreme Soviet of Russia"

=== Mobile Column ===
- GAZ-2975
- BTR-80 and BTR-82A
- **Typhoon-K armored personnel carrier** (first appearance)
- T-90A
- **9P157-2 Khrizantema-S tank destroyer** (first appearance)
- 2S19 Msta-S
- Buk-M2 missile system
- Tor-M2U missile system (first appearance for the M2U variant)
- S-400 Triumf
- Pantsir-S1
- 9K720 Iskander
- RS-24 Yars

=== Air Fly Past Column ===
- Mil Mi-26
- Mil Mi-8 Colors Party
- Mil Mi-24
- Mil Mi-28
- **Mil Mi-35** (first appearance)
- Kamov Ka-52
- Mikoyan MiG-29
- Sukhoi Su-24
- Sukhoi Su-34
- Sukhoi Su-27
- Mikoyan MiG-31
- Ilyushin Il-76
- Ilyushin Il-78
- Tupolev Tu-22M3
- Tupolev Tu-95
- Tupolev Tu-160
- Beriev A-50
- Sukhoi Su-25
- Antonov An-124
- Antonov An-22
- **Yakovlev Yak-130** (first appearance)

== Music ==
Flag procession, Review, and Address

- Sacred War (Священная Война) by Alexander Alexanderov
- Solemn Triumphal March (Торжественно-Триумфальный Марш) by Valery Khalilov
- March of the Preobrazhensky Regiment (Марш Преображенского Полка) by Unknown
- Slow March of the Officers Schools (Встречный Марш офицерских училищ) by Semyon Tchernetsky
- Slow March to Carry the War Flag (Встречный Марш для выноса Боевого Знамени) by Dmitriy Valentinovich Kadeyev
- Slow March of the Guards of the Navy (Гвардейский Встречный Марш Военно-Морского Флота) by Nikolai Pavlocich Ivanov-Radkevich
- Slow March (Встречный Марш) by Evgeny Aksyonov
- Glory (Славься) by Mikhail Glinka
- Parade Fanfare All Listen! (Парадная Фанфара “Слушайте все!”) by Andrei Golovin
- State Anthem of the Russian Federation (Государственный Гимн Российской Федерации) by Alexander Alexandrov
- Signal Retreat (Сигнал “Отбой”)

Infantry Column

- March General Miloradovich (Марш “Генерал Милорадович”) by Valery Khalilov
- Triumph of the Winners (Триумф Победителей)
- In Defense of the Homeland (В защиту Родины) by Viktor Sergeyevich Runov
- We are the Army of the People (Мы Армия Народа) by Georgy Viktorovich Mavsesya
- Air March (Авиамарш) by Yuliy Abramovich Khait
- Legendary Sevastopol (Легендарный Севастополь) by Bano Muradeli
- Crew is One Family (Экипаж - одна семья) by Viktor Vasilyevich Pleshak
- March of the Cosmonauts/Friends, I believe (Марш Космонавтов /Я верю, друзья) by Oskar Borisovich Feltsman
- Artillery March (Марш Артиллеристов) by Tikhon Khrennikov
- We Need One Victory (Нам Нужна Одна Победа) by Bulat Shalvovich Okudzhava
- To Serve Russia (Служить России) by Eduard Cemyonovich Khanok
- Sound about the Alarming Youth (Песня о тревожной молодости) by Alexandera Pakhmutova
- March Parade Ground (Марш “Плац”) by Valery Khalilov
- On Guard for the Peace (На страже Мира) by Boris Alexanderovich Diev
- Ballad of a Soldier (Баллада о Солдате) by Vasily Pavlovich Solovyov-Sedoy
- On the Road (В Путь) by Vasily Pavlovich Solovyov-Sedoy
- Victory Day (День Победы) by David Fyodorovich Tukhmanov

Mobile Column

- March General Miloradovich (Марш “Генерал Милорадович”) by Valery Khalilov
- Invincible and Legendary (Несокрушимая и легендарная) by Alexander Alexandrov
- Legendary Sevastopol (Легендарный Севастополь) by Bano Muradeli
- March Hero (Марш “Герой”) by Unknown
- March Three Tankmen (Марш “Три Танкиста”) by Pokrass Brothers
- March of the Soviet Tankists (Марш сове́тских танки́стов) by Pokrass Brothers
- March Victory (Марш “Победа”) by Albert Mikhailovich Arutyunov
- Katyusha (Катюша) by Matvey Blanter
- Artillery March (Марш Артиллеристов) by Tikhon Khrennikov
- Long Live our State (Да здравствует наша держава) by Boris Alexandrov

Air Column

- Air March (Авиамарш) by Yuliy Abramovich Khait
- March Airplanes – First of all (Марш “Первым делом самолёты”) by Vasili-Solovyov-Sedoi
- Air March (Авиамарш) by Yuliy Abramovich Khait

Conclusion

- Invincible and Legendary (Несокрушимая и легендарная) by Alexander Alexandrov
- Farewell of Slavianka (Прощание Славянки) by Vasiliy Agapkin

== Simultaneous Crimean parades ==
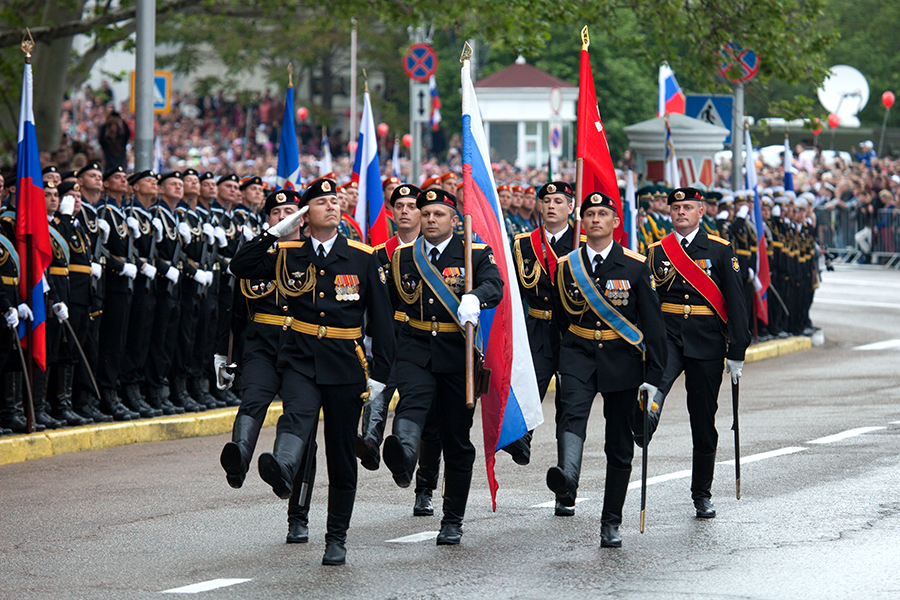
The parade in Sevastopol.

Parades occurred in 22 major Russian cities, and the newly incorporated federal city of Sevastopol, which was annexed by Russia (along with the rest of Crimea) in March 2014. Sevastopol also celebrated the 70th anniversary of its liberation from Nazi Germany in May 1944. This year the Crimean Hero City of Kerch also held its first holiday parade, and also celebrated the 70th anniversary of its liberation from Nazi Germany on April 11, 1944. The Sevastopol parade saw the Black Sea Fleet parade for the first time independently of the Ukrainian Navy. Putin also attended a fleet review on the city where he delivered an address.

Aside from these, 50 more cities and towns in Russia planned to hold joint civil/military parades in honor of the celebrations.

== Gallery ==
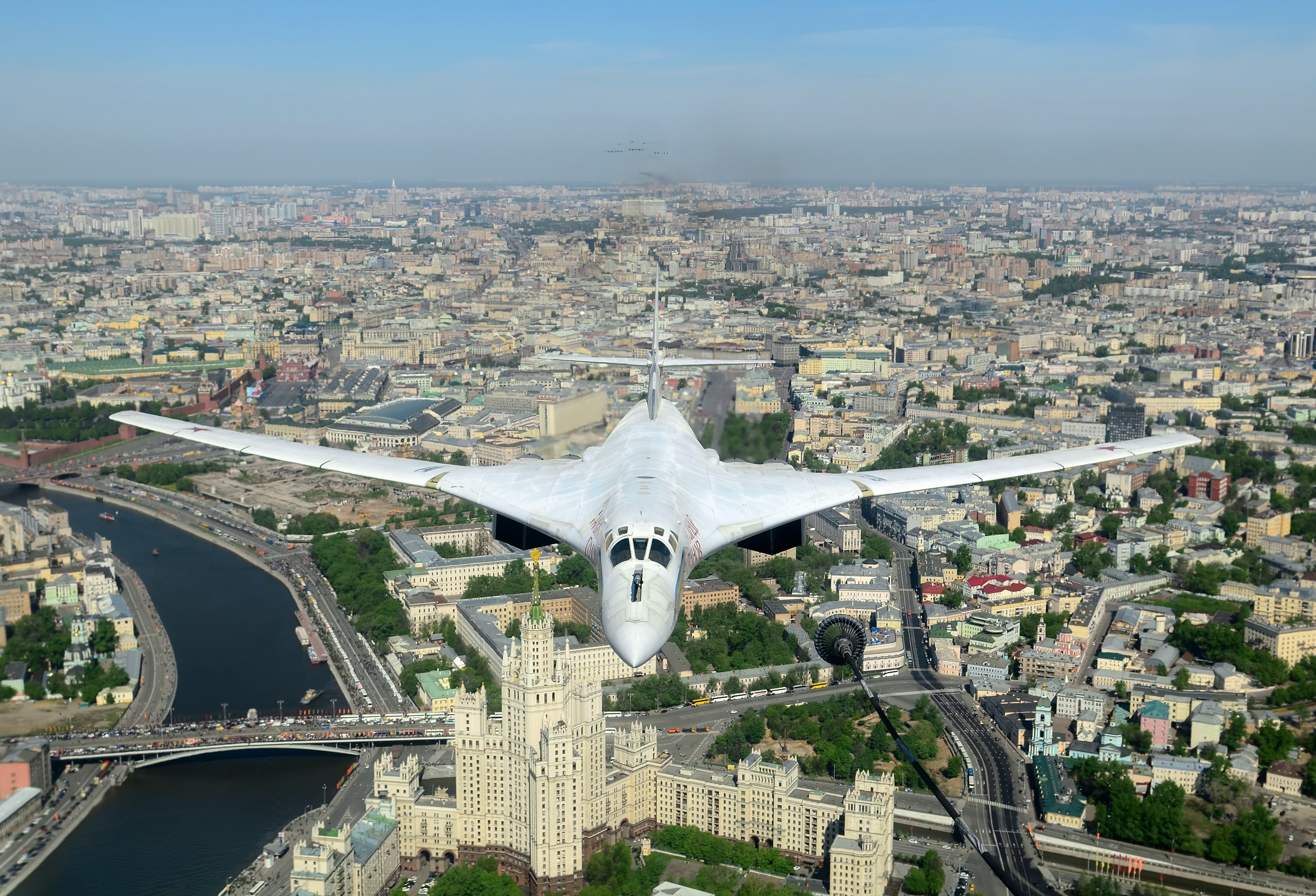

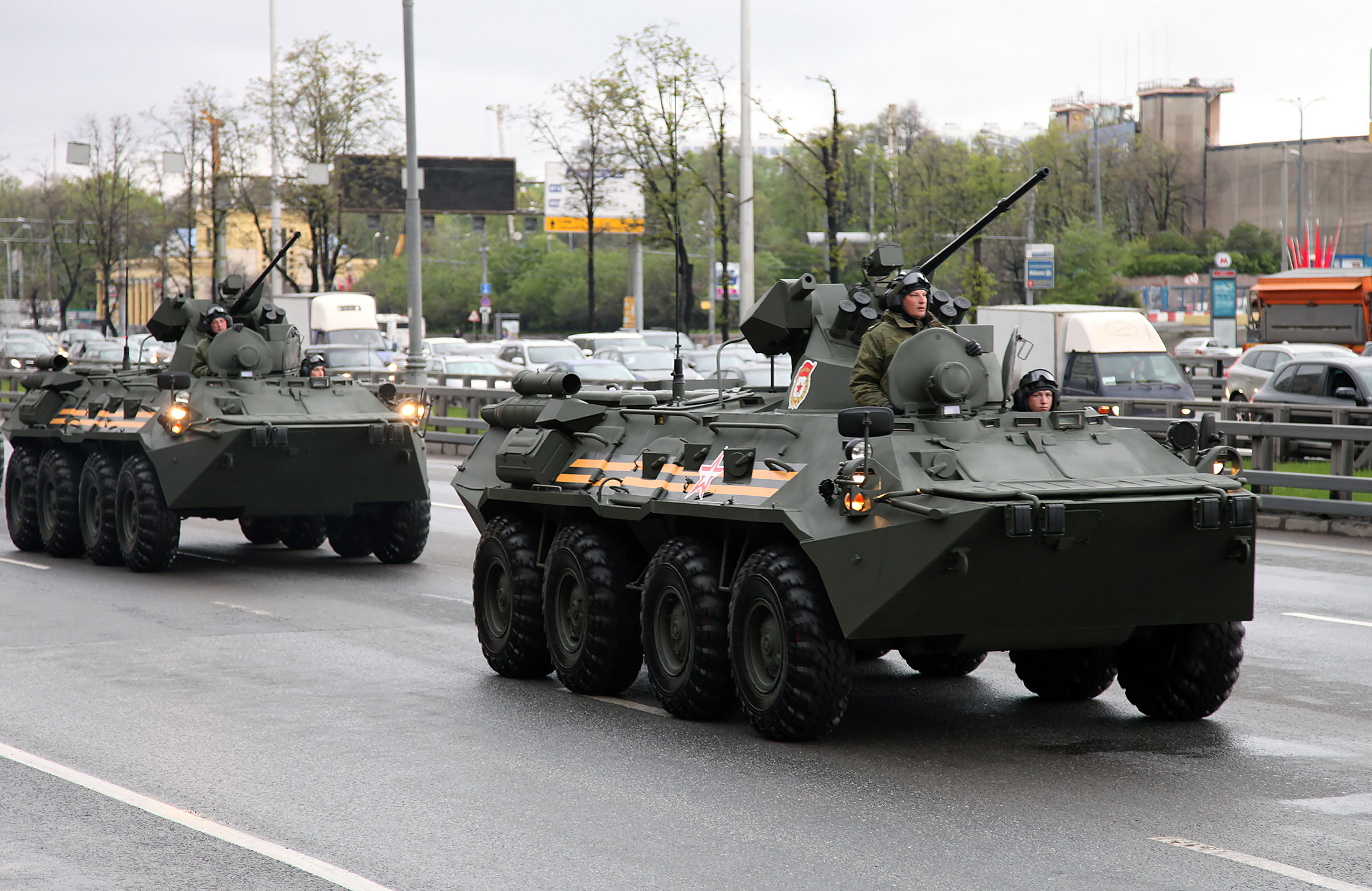

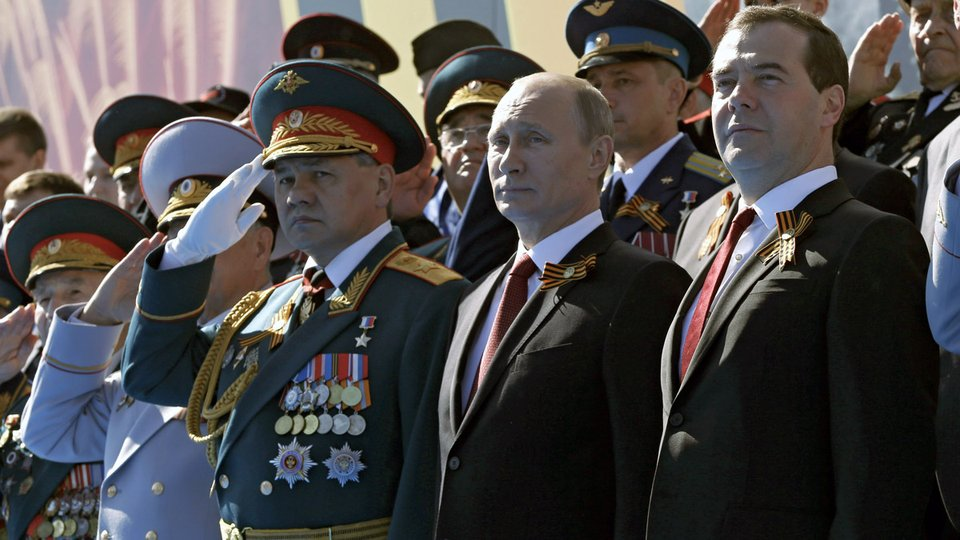

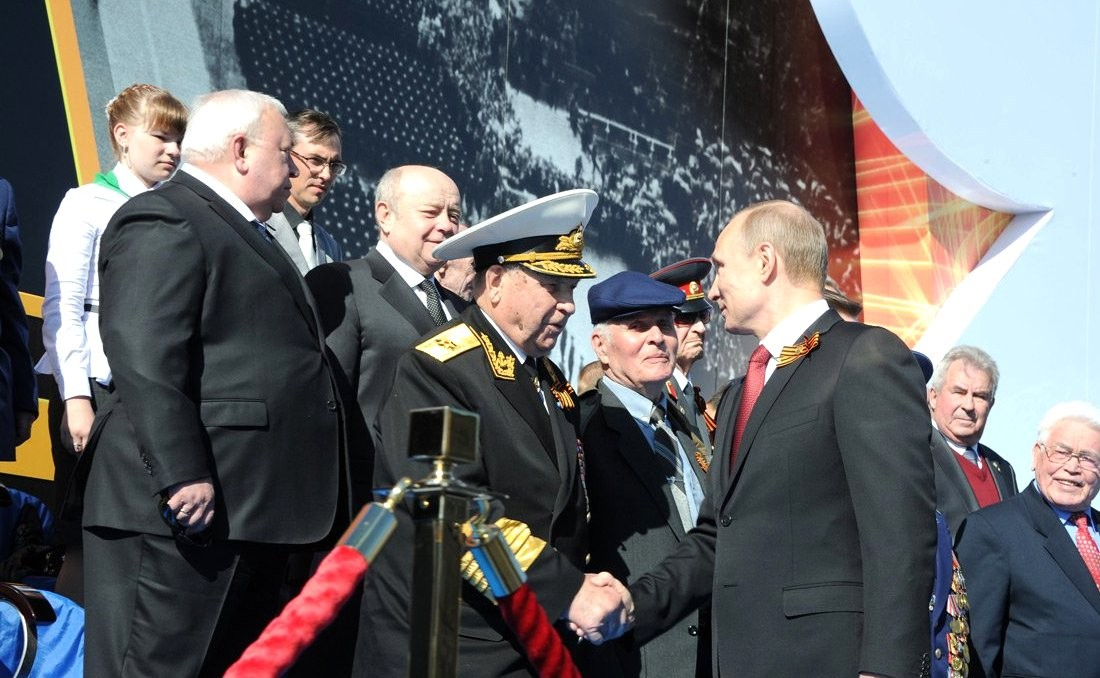

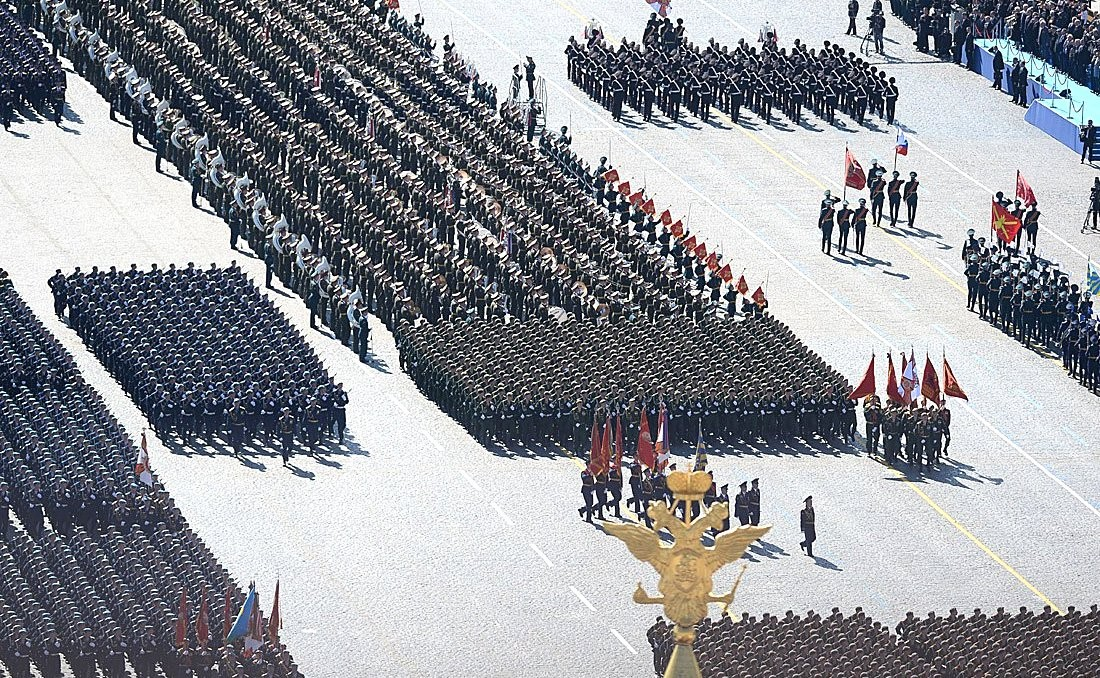

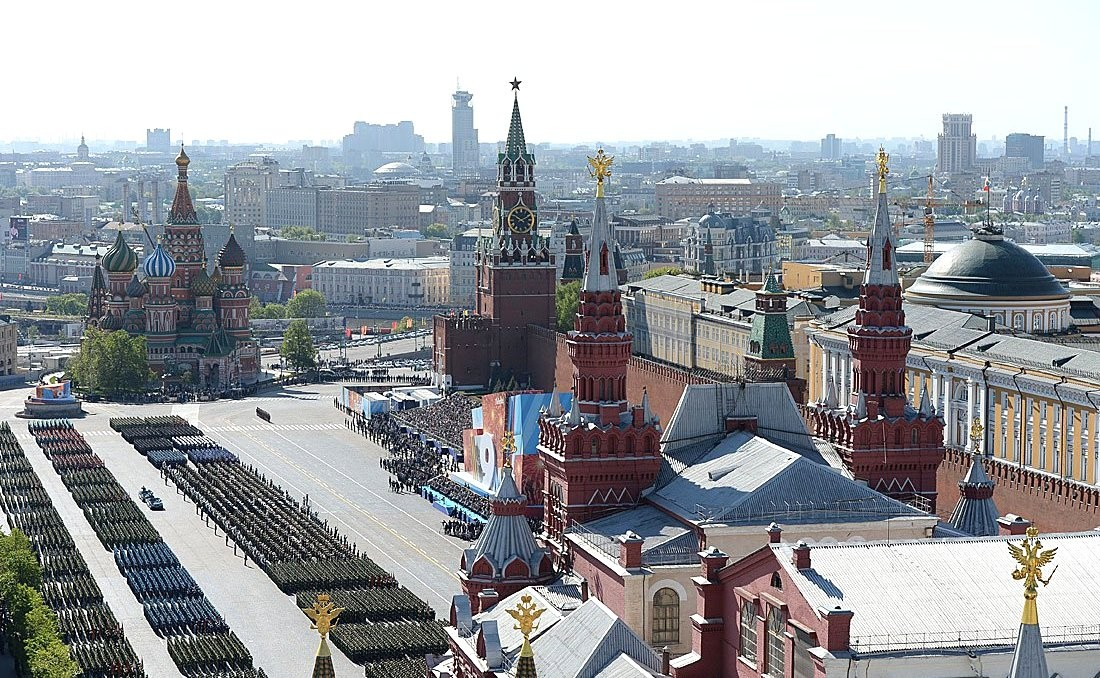

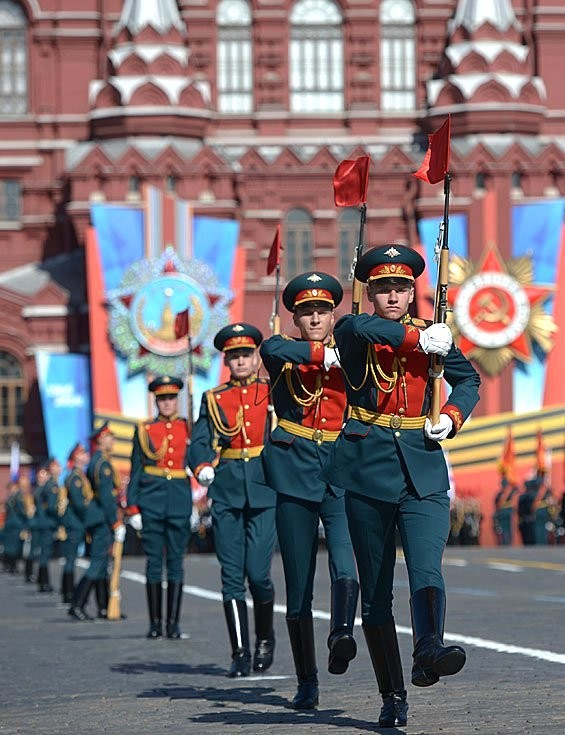

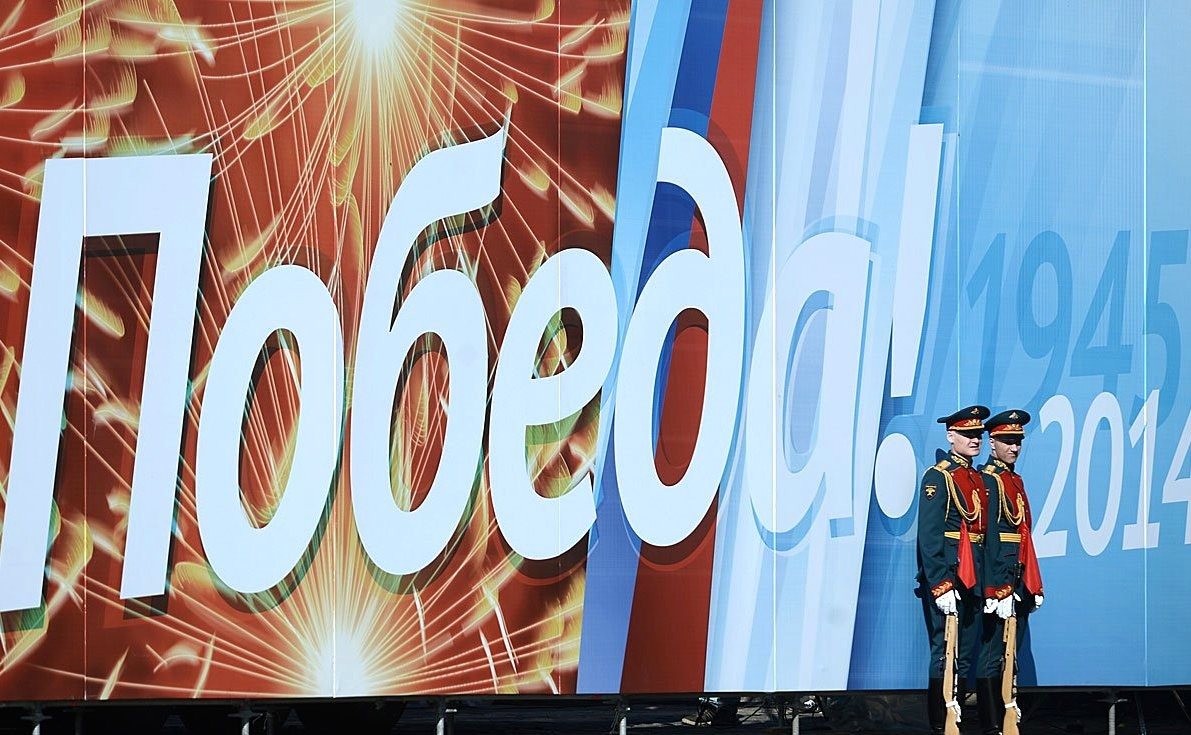

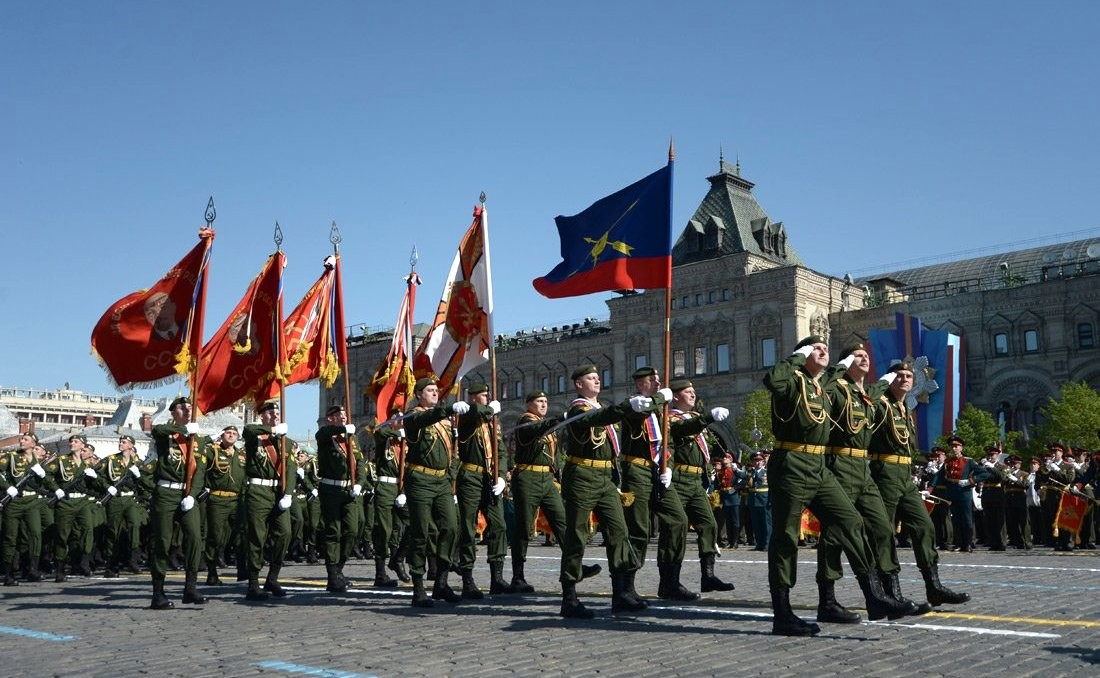

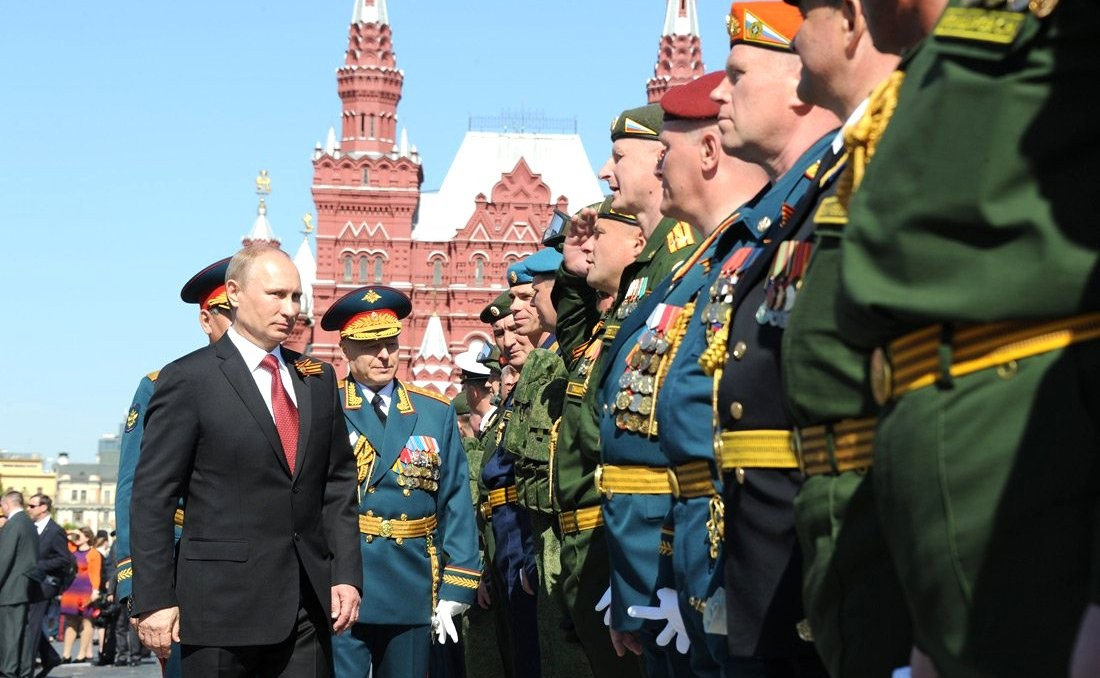

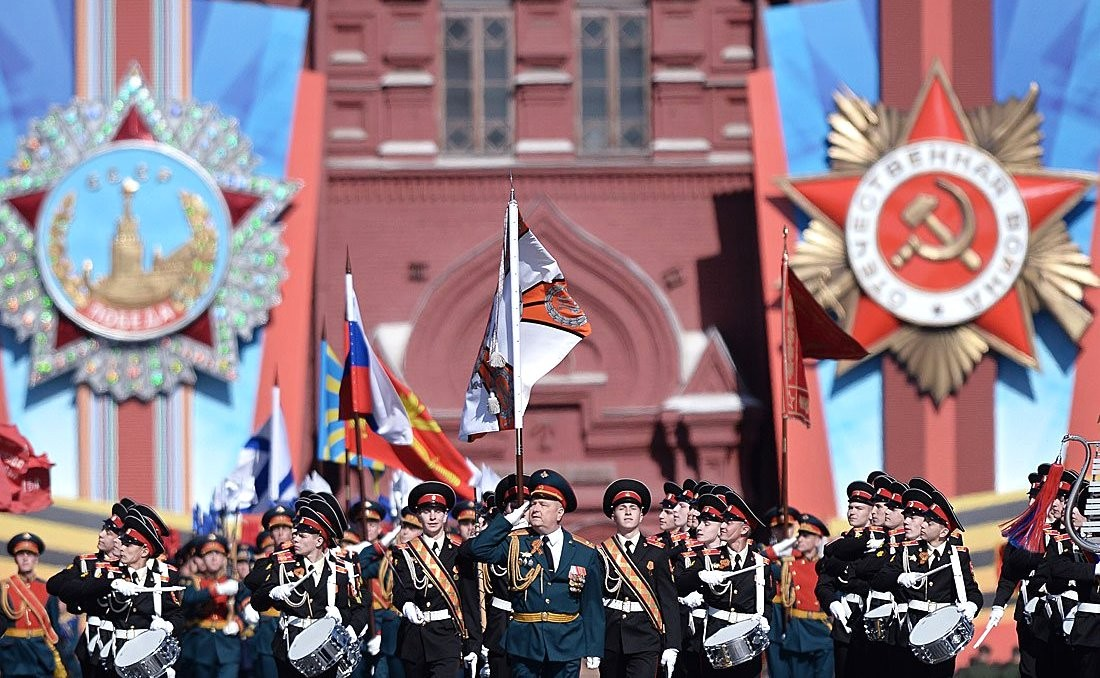

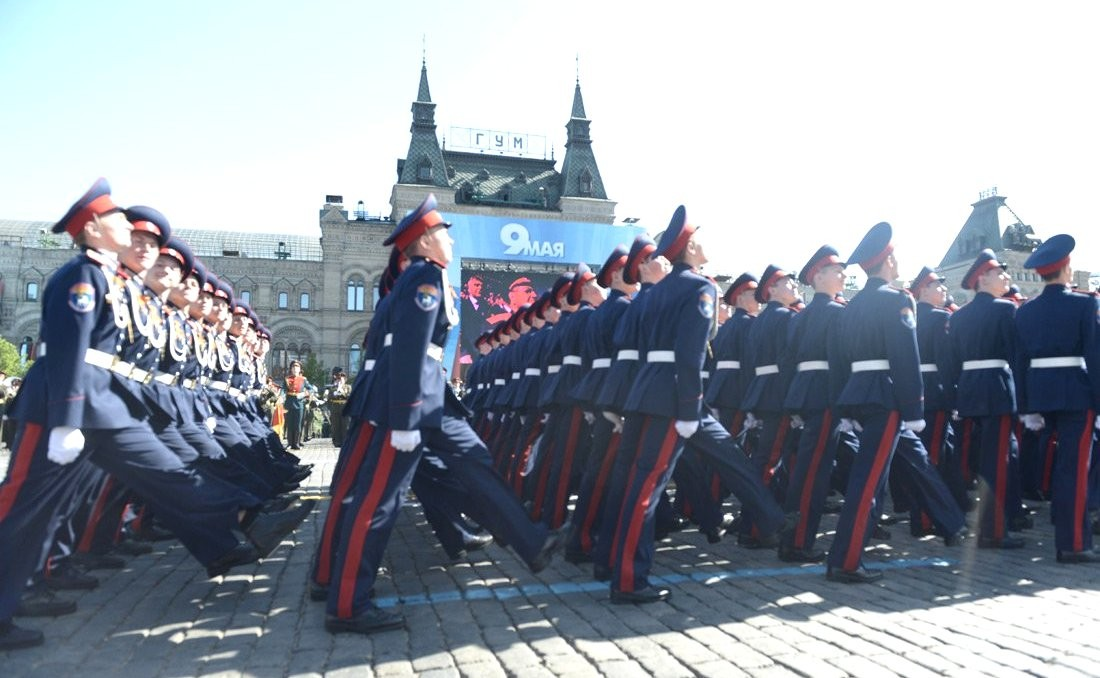

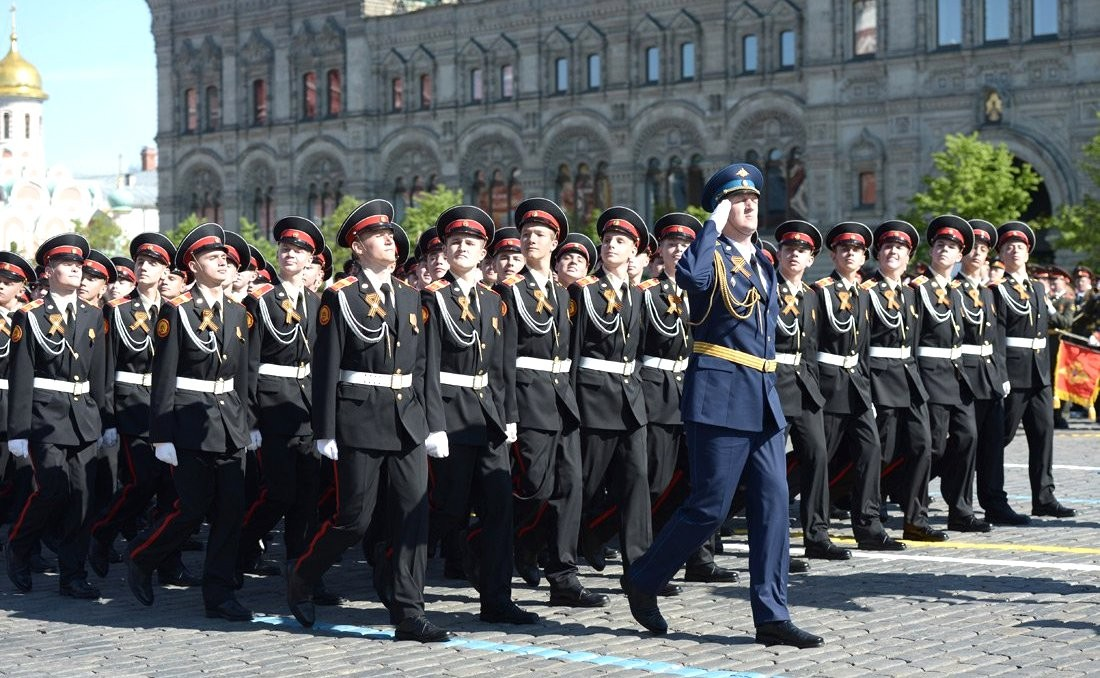

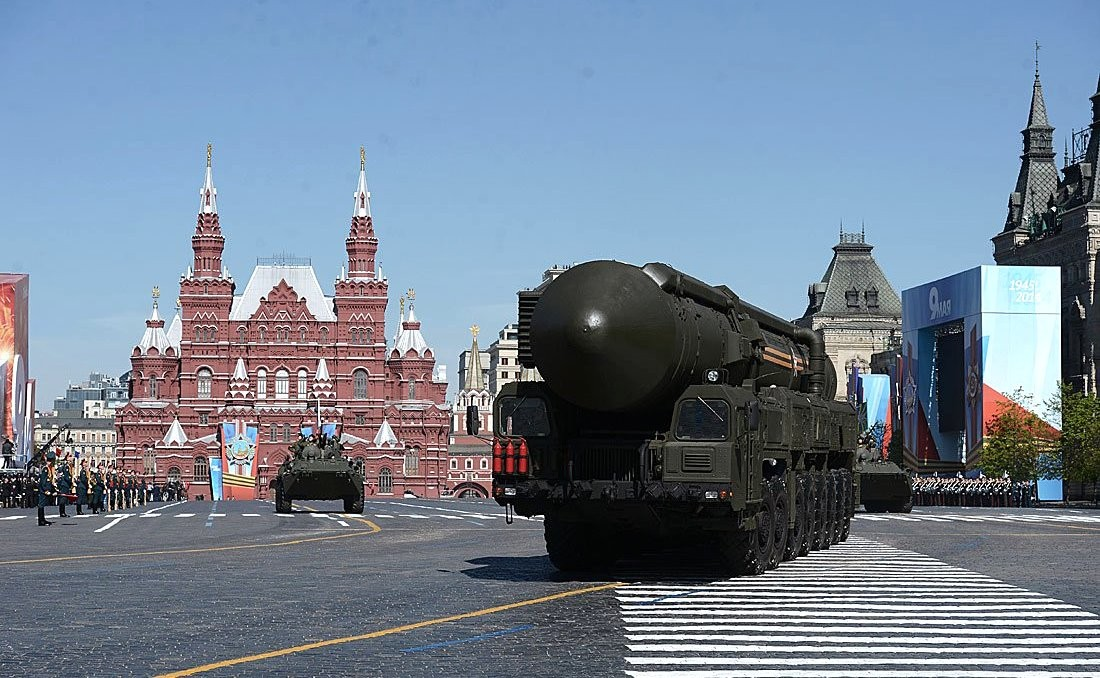

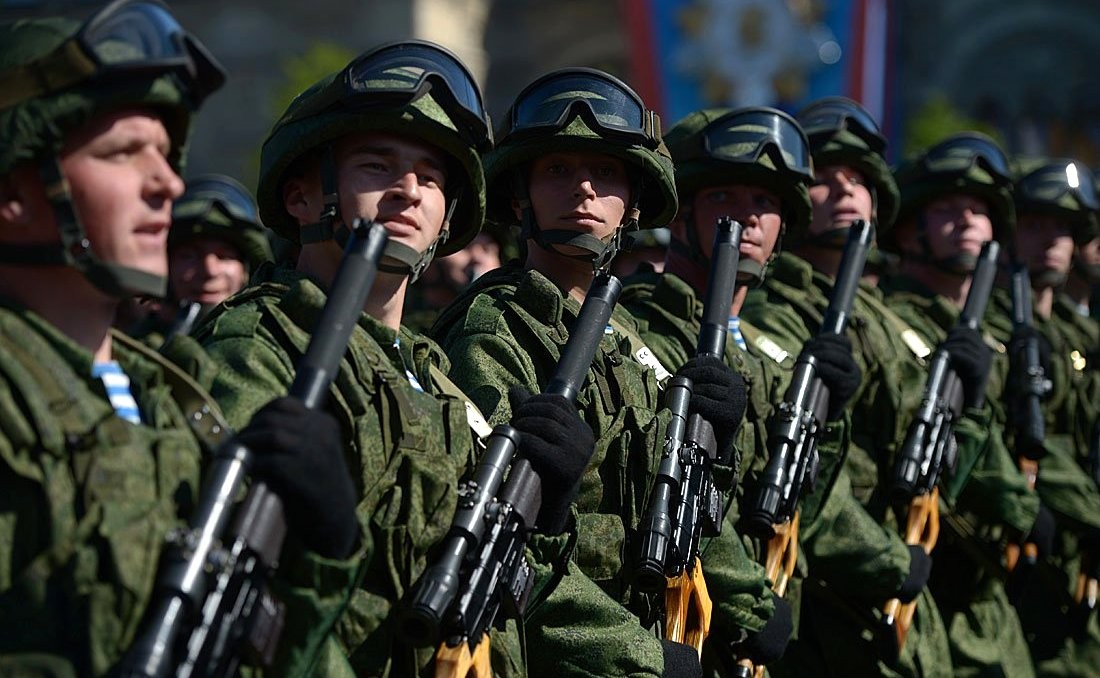

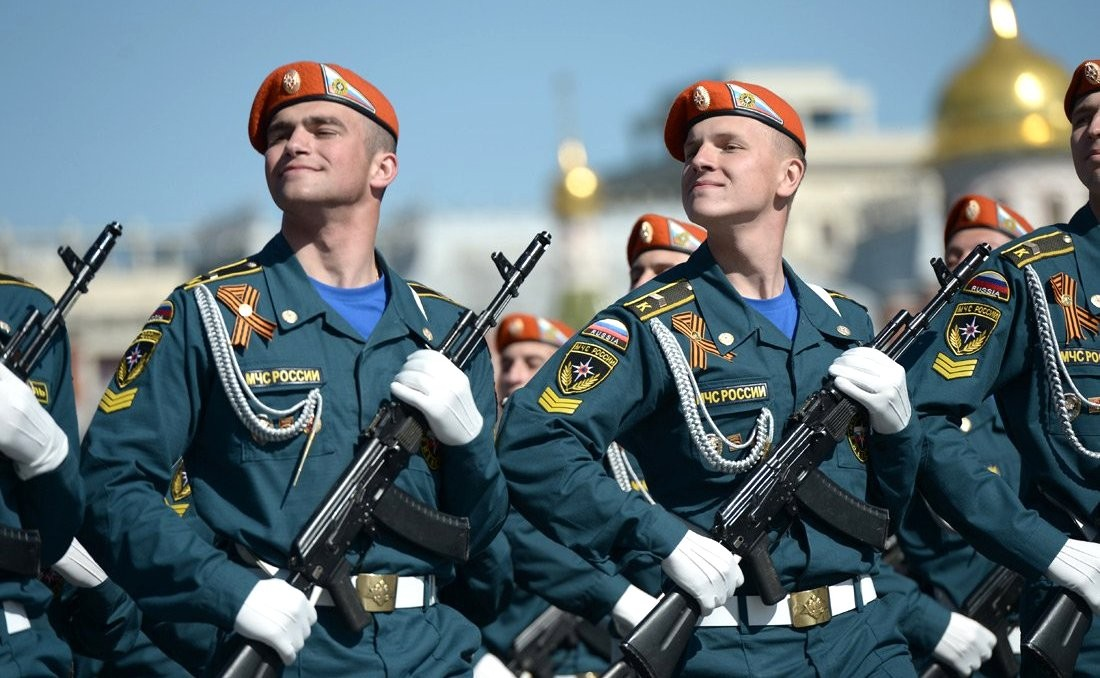

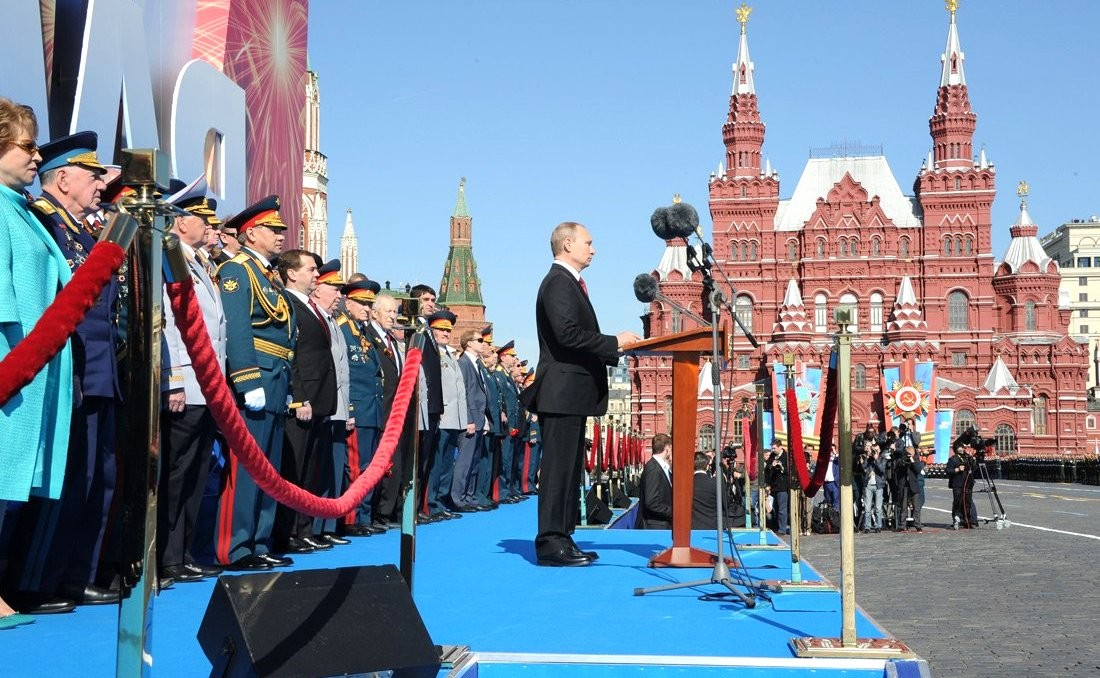

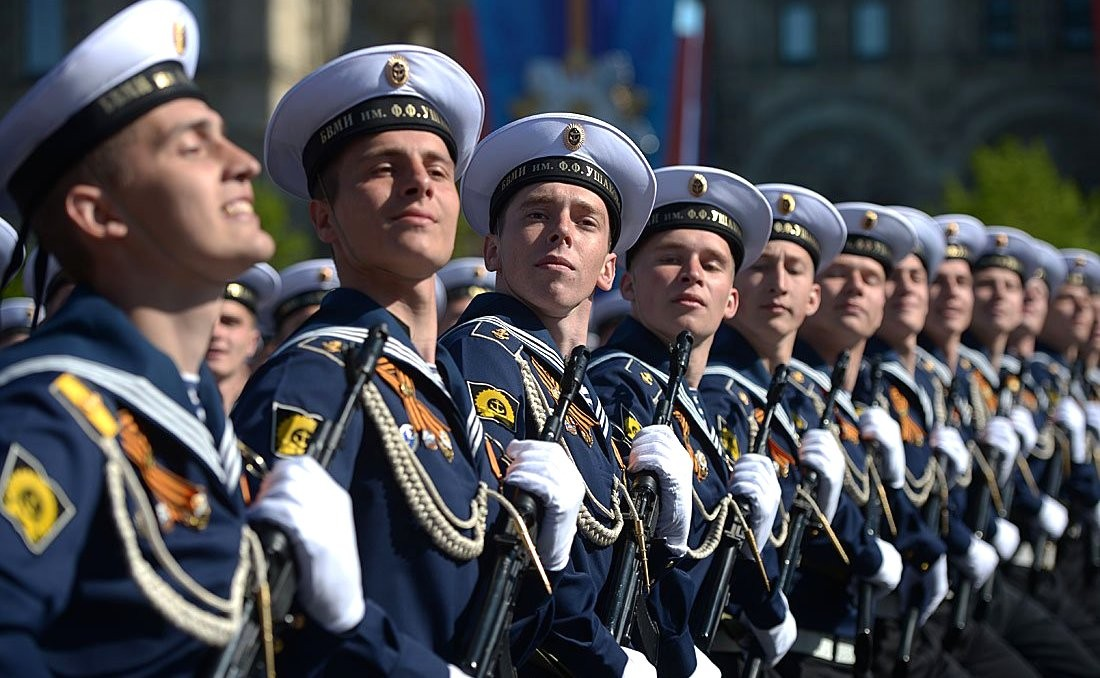

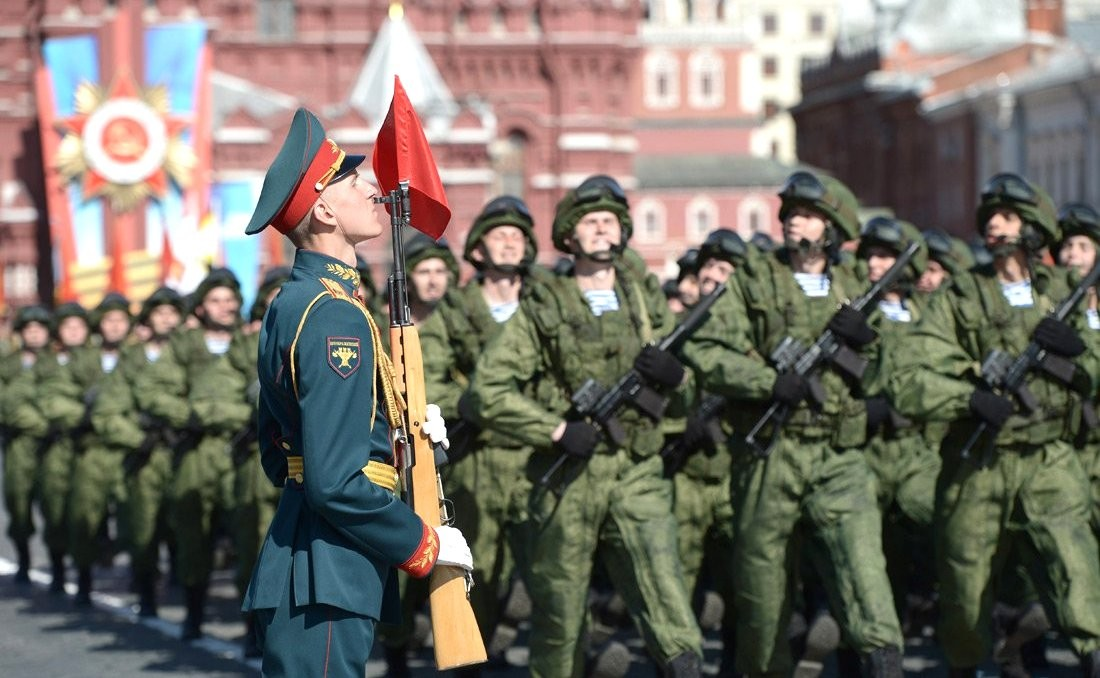

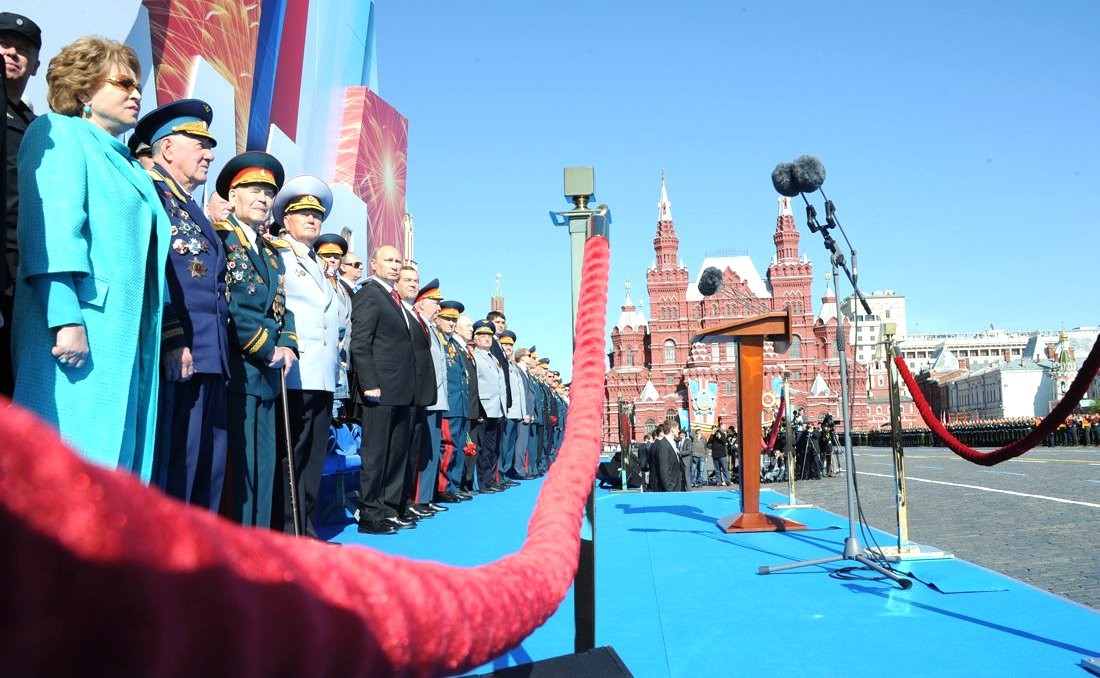

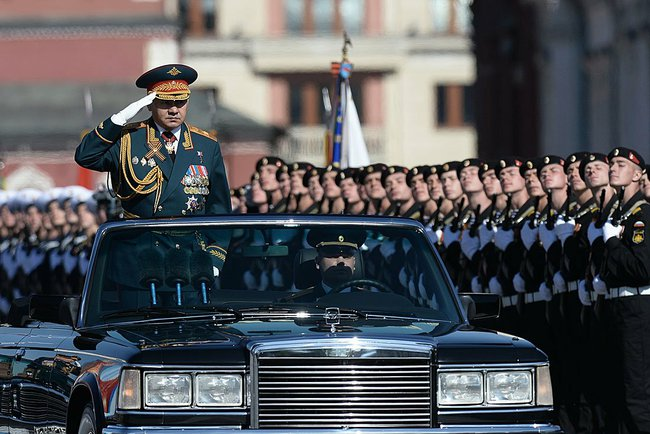

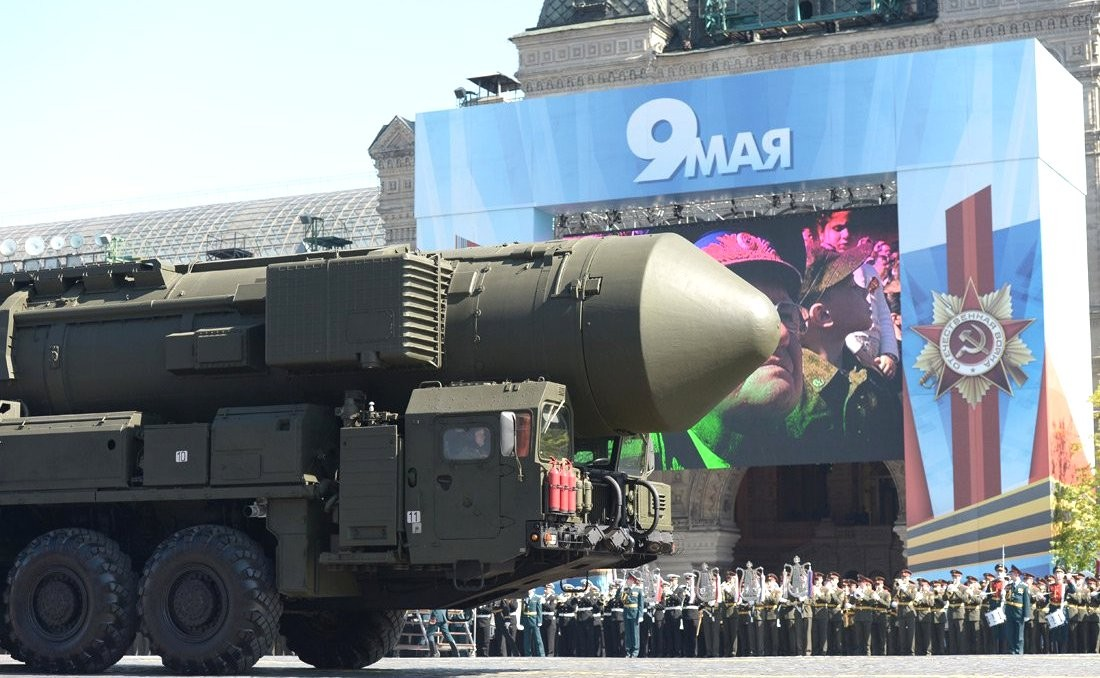

== See also ==
- Moscow Victory Parade of 1945
- Victory Day (9 May)
