= 1987 October Revolution Parade =

The 1987 October Revolution Parade was a parade on Red Square to celebrate the 70th anniversary of the October Revolution of 1917. It took place in Moscow on November 7, 1987. Marshal of the Soviet Union and the Minister of Defence Dmitry Yazov inspected the parade. Commanding the parade was the commander of the Moscow Garrison Vladimir Arkhipov. Music was performed by the head of Moscow Garrison's central band, Major General Nikolai Mikhailov. General Secretary of the Communist Party of the Soviet Union Mikhail Gorbachev and other members of the Politburo were on the grandstand of Lenin's Mausoleum in Red Square.

== Music ==
Providing the ceremonial music for the parade was the massed bands of the Moscow Military District, under the overall direction of Major General Nikolay Mikhailov.

Inspection and address

1. Jubilee Slow March "25 Years of the Red Army" (Юбилейный встречный марш "25 лет РККА) by Semyon Chernetsky
2. Slow March of the Tankmen (Встречный Марш Танкистов) by Semyon Chernetsky
3. Slow March of the Guards of the Navy (Гвардейский Встречный Марш Военно-Морского Флота) by Nikolai Pavlocich Ivanov-Radkevich
4. Slow March of the Officers Schools (Встречный Марш офицерских училищ) by Semyon Chernetsky)
5. Slow March (Встречный Марш) by Dmitry Pertsev
6. Slow March of the Red Army (Встречный Марш Красной Армии) by Semyon Chernetsky
7. Slow March of the Guards of the Navy (Гвардейский Встречный Марш Военно-Морского Флота) by Nikolai Pavlocich Ivanov-Radkevich
8. Slow March Victory (Встречный Марш «Победа») by Yuriy Griboyedov
9. Slow March of the Guards of the Navy (Гвардейский Встречный Марш Военно-Морского Флота) by Nikolai Pavlocich Ivanov-Radkevich
10. Slow March (Встречный Марш) by Viktor Sergeyebich Runov
11. Slow March of the Guards of the Navy (Гвардейский Встречный Марш Военно-Морского Флота) by Nikolai Pavlocich Ivanov-Radkevich
12. Long Live our State (Да здравствует наша держава) by Boris Alexandrov
13. Signal Everyone, listen! (Сигнал «Слушайте все!») by unknown composer
14. State Anthem of the Soviet Union (Государственный Гимн Советского Союза) by Alexander Alexandrov
15. Fanfare (Фанфара)

Infantry Column

1. Varshavianka
2. The Red Army is the Strongest
3. Trot March (Трот-марш) by Semyon Chernetsky (Based on the Ukrainian folk song Gandzia)
4. We are the Red Cavalry
5. The Sacred War by Alexandrov and Lebedev-Kumach
6. Victory Day (День Победы) by David Fyodorovich Tukhmanov
7. In Defense of the Homeland (В защиту Родины) by Viktor Sergeyevich Runov
8. On Guard for the Peace (На страже Мира) by Boris Alexandrovich Diev
9. Combat March (Строевой Марш) by Dmitry Illarionovich Pertsev
10. Air March (Авиамарш) by Yuliy Abramovich Khait
11. Leningrad (Ленинград) by Viktor Sergeyeich Runov
12. We are the Army of the People (Мы – армия народа) by Georgy Viktorovich Mavsesyan
13. There is a parade on Red Square (У нас парад на Красной площади; literal translation from English, no other info on this piece)
14. Sports March (Спортивный Марш) by Valentin Volkov
15. Wide is My Motherland

Mobile Column

1. Victorious March (Победный Марш) by Nikolai Pavlocich Ivanov-Radkevich
2. Salute to Moscow (Салют Москвы) by Semyon Chernetsky
3. March of the Tankmen (Марш Танкистов) by Semyon Chernetsky

Conclusion

Invincible and legendary (Несокрушимая и легендарная) by Alexander Alexandrov

== Parade Units ==
=== Military Bands ===
- Massed Bands of the Moscow Military District under the direction of Major General Nikolai Mikhailov, Senior Director of Music of the Bands Service
- Corps of Drums of the Moscow Military Music College (recently awarded the Komsomol Prize)

=== Ground Column ===
Leading the column was the limousine carrying the parade commander, Col. General Vladimir Arkhipov, the commanding general of the Moscow Military District.

- Historical Units
  - Octobert Revolution Regiment
    - Combined Color Guard consisting of 50 Civil War era colors
    - Red Guards
    - Former Imperial Russian Army personnel with the Red Army
    - Naval contingent
    - Red Army personnel of 1922
    - Historical Cavalry Units
  - Great Patriotic War Regiment
    - 12 member tri-services color guard led by the Victory Banner
    - Combined Color Guard
    - Historical "Warrior-Liberators" Regiment in winter combat uniform
- Frunze Military Academy
- V. I. Lenin Military Political Academy
- Felix Dzerzhinsky Artillery Academy
- Military Armored Forces Academy Marshal Rodion Malinovsky
- Military Engineering Academy
- Military Academy of Chemical Defense and Control
- Yuri Gagarin Air Force Academy
- Prof. Nikolai Zhukovsky Air Force Engineering Academy
- Naval Engineering School
- Moscow Border Guards Institute of the Border Defence Forces of the KGB "Moscow City Council"
- Moscow Garrison units:
  - 98th Guards Airborne Division
  - OMSDON
  - 336th Marine Regiment of the Baltic Fleet
- Suvorov Military School
- Nakhimov Naval School
- Moscow Military High Command Training School "Supreme Soviet of the Russian SFSR"

=== Mobile column ===
- 2nd Guards Tamanskaya Motorized Rifle Division
  - BRDM-2
  - BTR-70
  - BMP-2
- 98th Airborne Division
  - BMD-1
- 4th Guards Kantermirovsky Tank Division
  - T-72
- Rocket Forces and Artillery
  - 2S9 Nona
  - 2S1 Gvozdika
  - 2S3 Akatsiya
  - BM-21 Grad

== International dignitaries ==
- Cuba - Fidel Castro
- East Germany - Erich Honecker
- (People's Republic of Bulgaria) Bulgaria - Todor Zhivkov
- (Polish People's Republic) Poland - Wojciech Jaruzelski
- (Socialist Republic of Romania) Romania - Nicolae Ceaușescu
- Ethiopia - Mengistu Haile Mariam
- (Hungarian People's Republic) Hungary - János Kádár
- (Mongolian People's Republic) Mongolia - Jambyn Batmönkh
- (Cambodia) Kampuchea (Note: This polity is the internationally recognized government of Cambodia as the territory was under a Vietnamese-backed government, the People's Republic of Kampuchea, recognized by the Soviet Bloc.)- Norodom Sihanouk

== Gallery ==
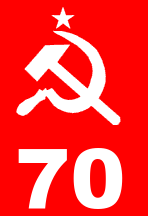
The banner for the 1987 parade.
