= 1990 October Revolution Parade =

Parade in the Soviet Union, 1990

The 1990 October Revolution Parade was the last parade commemorating the 1917 October Revolution during the Soviet Union's existence. It celebrated the 73rd anniversary of the revolution.

== Description and particularities ==
Among those present were Mikhail Gorbachev, Nikolai Ryzhkov, Anatoly Lukyanov, Boris Yeltsin (first president of the Russian Federation), and Gavriil Popov. At the chimes of the Kremlin Clock, Gorbachev gave an address to the nation. It would be the second and last time a Soviet leader made an address on Lenin's Mausoleum during an October Revolution Day parade. It is the only Soviet parade when the inspection of troops are held after the President's speech and anthem, in contrast to the previous parades which the inspection of troops begin, followed by speech by the parade inspector and anthem, besides one of the few parades when the emblems of the Soviet Republics are not in display on the Red Square other than the 1990 Victory Day Parade, most possibly due to independence of Lithuania and Latvia (including Estonia although independence yet to be declared, but had changed its emblem, flag and official name to Republic of Estonia). After the anthem was played, the commander of the parade Colonel General Nikolai Kalinin reported to the parade inspector Marshal of the Soviet Union Dmitry Yazov. The parade of 1990 was the last military parade to feature military equipment, a sight that would not be seen until the 2008 Moscow Victory Day Parade 18 years later. Providing the music for the parade was the Massed Bands of the Moscow Military District, led by the director of the Military Band Service of the Armed Forces of the Soviet Union, Major General Nikolai Mikhailov. It is also the only parade when the Soviet leadership on the grandstand moved down from the grandstand to lead the civilian demonstration after the military parade.

== Full order of the march past ==
At the front of the parade was the limousine carrying the commander of the parade, Colonel General Nikolai Kalinin.

Massed Bands

- Corps of Drums of the Moscow Military Music College
- Massed Military Bands of the Moscow Military District

Ground Column

- Frunze Military Academy
- V. I. Lenin Military Political Academy
- Felix Dzerzhinsky Engineering Academy
- Military Armored Forces Academy Marshal Rodion Malinovskovy
- Military Academy of Chemical Defense and Control
- Yuri Gagarin Air Force Academy
- Prof. Nikolai Zhukovsky Air Force Engineering Academy
- Naval Engineering School
- 98th Guards Airborne Division
- Moscow Border Guards Institute of the Border Defence Forces of the KGB "Moscow City Council"
- 336th Marine Brigade
- OMSDON regiment
- Suvorov Military Academy
- Nakhimov Naval School
- Moscow Military High Command Training School "Supreme Soviet of the Russian SFSR"

Mobile Column

- 2nd Guards Tamanskaya Motorized Rifle Division
  - BTR-80
  - BMP-2
- 98th Guards Airborne Division
  - BMD-2
- 4th Guards Kantermirovsky Tank Division
  - T-80
- Rocket Forces and Artillery
  - 2S3 Akatsiya
  - 2S19 Msta
  - BM-21 Grad
  - RT-2PM Topol

== Music ==
Providing the ceremonial music for the parade was the massed bands of the Moscow Military District, under the overall direction of Major General Nikolay Mikhaylov.

Address and inspection

- Moscow Parade Fanfare ("Московская Парадная Фанфара") with the tune of Comrades, we bravely march! ("Смело, товарищи, в ногу!")
- State Anthem of the Soviet Union (Государственный Гимн Советского Союза) by Aleksandr Aleksandrov
- Fanfare (Фанфара)
- Slow March of the Officers Schools (Встречный Марш офицерских училищ) by Semyon Tchernetsky
- Slow March of the Tankmen (Встречный Марш Танкистов) by Semyon Tchernetsky
- Slow March of the Guards of the Navy (Гвардейский Встречный Марш Военно-Морского Флота) by Nikolay Ivanov-Radkevich
- Jubilee Slow March "25 Years of the Red Army" (Юбилейный встречный марш "25 лет РККА) by Semyon Tchernetsky
- Slow March (Встречный Марш) by Dmitriy Pertsev
- Slow March of the Red Army (Встречный Марш Красной Армии) by Semyon Tchernetsky
- Slow March Victory (Встречный Марш «Победа») by Yuriy Griboyedov
- Slow March (Встречный Марш) by Severyan Ganichev
- Slow March of the Guards of the Navy (Гвардейский Встречный Марш Военно-Морского Флота) by Nikolay Ivanov-Radkevich
- Slow March (Встречный Марш) by Viktor Runov
- Slav'sya (Славься) by Mikhail Glinka
- Signal Everyone, listen! (Сигнал «Слушайте все!»)

Infantry Column

- Fife and drums with trumpet tune of Comrades, we bravely march! ("Смело, товарищи, в ногу!") by *Leonid Radin
- March Parade (Марш "Парад") by Vasiliy Dul'skiy
- March Victory (Марш Победа) by Al'bert Arutyunov
- In Defense of the Motherland (В защиту Родины) by Viktor Runov
- On Guard for Peace ("На страже Мира") by Boris Diyev
- Phalanx March ("Строевой Марш") by Dmitriy Pertsev
- March Leningrad ("Марш Ленинград") by Viktor Runov
- We are the Army of the People (Мы Армия Народа) by Georgiy Movsesyan
- Sports March ("Спортивный Марш") by Valentin Volkov
- March Victory Day (Марш "День Победы") by David Tukhmanov
- Long Live Our State (Да здравствует наша держава) by Boris Aleksandrov

Mobile Column and Conclusion of the Military Segment

- We Need One Victory ("Нам нужна одна Победа") by Bulat Okudzhava
- March of the Tankmen (Марш Танкистов) by Semyon Tchernetsky
- Warszawianka ("Варшавянка") by Józef Pławiński
- Invincible and Legendary (Несокрушимая и легендарная) by Aleksandr Aleksandrov

== Parades in other cities of the USSR ==
Revolution Day parades and celebrations were also held in many Soviet republics and cities of the Russian Soviet Federative Socialist Republic. For the first time in Soviet history, the traditional 7 November parade in Kyiv, the capital city of the Ukrainian SSR, was the only event held on the holiday, with the parade location in Kyiv was changed from Khreshchatyk Street to Victory Square (Ploshcha Peremohy) by order of the Kyiv City Council. It was also limited to a one-hour parade from 9 to 10 am. No full-size tanks were displayed at the parade. The parade was also the last one held in many republics, including the Tajik SSR and the Uzbek SSR.

On the other hand, the Revolution Day parade in the Lithuanian capital of Vilnius, was held contrary to parliamentary decree banning military parades "without a permit". The parade on Gediminas Avenue, which began at 10 am local time and had been rehearsed for over a week, marched past the Lithuanian Parliament to the Lenin Monument, where several thousand a rally of pro-Soviet demonstrators was held, with many demonstrators being bused in from outside of Lithuania. Chairman of the Supreme Council Vytautas Landsbergis and Prime Minister Kazimira Prunskienė both condemned the military parade as "psychological warfare" and an attempt by the Soviet authorities to "intimidate" breakaway republic. A similar situation occurred in the Latvian capital of Riga, where on 10 October the Supreme Council and the Riga City Executive Committee had announced that Gorbachev's decree on organizing military parades in local cities was not binding in Latvia.

== Attempted assassination of Gorbachev ==
At 11:00 am, an hour after the parade began, an attempt to kill President Gorbachev was made by Alexander Shmonov. The two bullets he fired missed and he was tackled to the ground by crowds of demonstrators. Shmonov was the last would-be-assassin of the Soviet period before the USSR's dissolution in 1991. He was sent to forced treatment which took a heavy toll on his mental state. Three weeks prior to the parade, Shmonov bought a double-barreled hunting rifle. At the parade, Shmonov took out his rifle and was spotted immediately by the militsiya, and as he was taking aim, an officer ran over and jerked the rifle by the barrel as the crowd jumped on him. Soviet Central television did not broadcast the assassination attempt and resumed its regular broadcasting at 11:25 am. (Note: "Television broadcasting was interrupted at 11:10 and a concert of classical music played.")
