= 1989 October Revolution Parade =

The 1989 October Revolution Parade was a parade that took place in Red Square in Moscow on 7 November 1989 to commemorate the 72nd anniversary of the socialist revolution in the Russian Empire in 1917. Mikhail Gorbachev (the General Secretary of the Communist Party of the Soviet Union) and the Soviet leadership watched the parade from Lenin's Mausoleum. General of the Army and Minister of Defence Dmitry Yazov made his third holiday address to the nation after he inspected seven sets of armed battalions and academies. Col. Gen. Nikolai Kalinin the head of the Moscow Military District was the 1989 parade commander.

== Context ==
The parade was the second-to-last traditional October Revolution military parades in the USSR's existence. Two days after the parade, the Berlin Wall in East Berlin fell. This would be the last time that Gorbachev would be at the parade in the capacity of General Secretary. Other guests included Nikolai Ryzhkov (the Premier of the Soviet Union) and political prisoner Yuri Fidelgolts. Defense Minister Yazov spoke from the rostrum of the mausoleum about the priority of "universal human interest" and "the unilateral reduction of armaments". International observers noticed the absence of missiles from the Strategic Missile Forces. After the mobile column segment, Massed bands of the Moscow Military District under Major General Nikolai Mikhailov performed an exhibition drill before they marched off Red Square. After the parade, demonstrations of workers from various Soviet jobs and a parade of Soviet peoples and athletes took place through Red Square.

== Parade order ==
=== Ground column ===
- Corps of Drums of the Moscow Military Music School (drummers march to 120 beats per minute)
- M. V. Frunze Military Academy
- Felix Dzerzhinsky Artillery Academy
- Military Armored Forces Academy Marshal Rodion Malinovskovy
- Yuri Gagarin Air Force Academy
- Prof. Nikolai Zhukovsky Air Force Engineering Academy
- M. V. Frunze Naval College
- 98th Guards Airborne Division
- Moscow Border Guards Institute of the Border Defence Forces of the KGB "Moscow City Council"
- 336th Guards Naval Infantry Brigade
- OMSDON Division of the Internal Troops
- Suvorov Military School
- Nakhimov Naval School
- Moscow Military High Command Training School "Supreme Soviet of the Russian SFSR"

=== Mobile column ===
- 2nd Guards Motor Rifle Division
- Airborne Forces
- 4th Guards Tank Division
- Rocket Complexes of the Soviet Army

== Other parades in Soviet cities ==
Revolution Day parades and celebrations were also held in many Soviet cities such as Leningrad's Palace Square. In Leningrad, a 30,000-strong column of opposition forces, took part in a general demonstration under the slogan, "November 7 - the day of national tragedy" and "We will strike with perestroika on communism". The local Militsiya cut off some of the participants, kept them cordoned off for half an hour, avoiding a potential breakout of violence.

The capitals of Soviet republics also held their own parades:

- (Moldavian Soviet Socialist Republic) Chișinău, Moldavian SSR, Victory Square
- (Byelorussian Soviet Socialist Republic) Minsk, Belarusian SSR, Lenin Square
- (Ukrainian Soviet Socialist Republic) Kiev, Ukrainian SSR, Kreshchatyk Street
- (Uzbek Soviet Socialist Republic) Tashkent, Uzbek SSR, Lenin Square
- (Lithuanian Soviet Socialist Republic) Vilnius, Lithuanian SSR, Gediminas Avenue

The Government of the Armenian SSR cancelled the parade in on Lenin Square in Yerevan due to protest, officially ending the republic's tradition of military parades. In the Georgian SSR, the parade was cancelled in Tbilisi in the face of protests from the National Independence Party. On the morning of 7 November, a group of 100 people took candles and stood in front of tanks preparing for the parade in Kishinev. Once supporters of the Popular Front of Moldova arrived at Victory Square, the leaders of Communist Party of Moldova left the central stage immediately, with the mobile column of the parade being cancelled. Protesters in Vilnius blocked the tanks rolling through the central avenue, shortly delaying the mobile column, however the parade continued as planned.
