= Invincible and Legendary =

Soviet patriotic song

"Invincible and Legendary", (Note: Russian: Несокрушимая и легендарная, romanized: Nesokrushimaya i legendarnaya, IPA: [nʲɪsəkrʊˈʂɨməjə i‿lʲɪɡʲɪnˈdarnəjə]) also known as the "Song about the Soviet Army", (Note: Russian: Песня о Советской армии, romanized: Pesnya o Sovetskoy armii, IPA: [ˈpʲesʲnʲə ə‿sɐˈvʲetskəj ˈarmʲɪ(j)ɪ]) is a Soviet patriotic song written during the end of World War II. Its performance has been done by numerous artists, especially by the Alexandrov Ensemble. The original 1943 version was arranged by A. Alexandrov to the lyrics of Osip Kolychev, dedicated to the 25th anniversary of RKKA. There are many versions of the song.

Besides the original lyrics in Russian, the song has been performed in German, Hungarian, and Chinese.

== Refrain ==
Russian original

Несокрушимая и легендарная,
В боях познавшая радость побед -
Тебе любимая, родная армия
Шлёт наша Родина песню - привет.
Тебе шлёт Родина песню - привет.

Romanization of Russian

Nesokrushimaya i legendarnaya,
V boyakh poznavshaya radost' pobed -
Tebe lyubimaya, rodnaya armiya
Shlyot nasha Rodina pesnyu - privet
Tebe shlyot Rodina pesnyu - privet.

English translation

Invincible and legendary,
In battle, who experienced the joy of victories -
You dear beloved, native army
Our Motherland sends this song - hello!
The Motherland sends you a song - hello!
