= Long Live Our State =

Soviet patriotic song

"Да здравствует наша держава"

Song
- Language: Russian
- English title: "Long Live Our State"
- Written: 1942 (melody); 1943 (harmonized)
- Genre: Patriotic song, candidate national anthem
- Composer(s): Boris Alexandrovich Alexandrov
- Lyricist(s): Alexander Shilov

"Long Live Our State" (Russian: Да здравствует наша держава) is a Soviet patriotic song, composed by Boris Alexandrovich Alexandrov with lyrics by Alexander Shilov. The original melody was composed in the winter of 1942 after the Soviet victory in the Battle of Moscow, with the lyrics being harmonized to it later. It was considered as a candidate for the State Anthem of the Soviet Union in 1943.

The music was used in the October Revolution Parades from 1967, and the anthem of Transnistria adopted its melody.

== Lyrics ==
=== Original version ===
Russian original

Да здравствует наша держава,
Отчизна великих идей,
Страна всенародного права
На радость и счастье людей!
За это священное право,
За жизнь и свободу свою
Великая наша держава
Врагов побеждала в бою.

Припев:
Над Москвою чудесной,
Над любимой землёй
Лейся, радостная песня
По нашей стране молодой!
Вейся, красное знамя,
Символ наших побед!
Ты горишь всегда над нами,
Как солнца ликующий свет!

По Ленинским мудрым заветам
Нас партия к счастью ведёт.
И Сталинской думой согреты
Страна и Советский народ.
Несметны республик богатства,
И сил богатырских не счесть
В стране всенародного братства,
Где труд — это доблесть и честь.

Припев

От дальней Советской границы
До башен старинных Кремля
Растут города и станицы,
Цветут золотые поля.
И с каждым зерном урожая,
И с новым ударом станка
Всё крепнет и крепнет родная,
Великая наша страна!

Припев

Romanization of Russian

Da zdrastvuyet nasha derzhava,
Otchizna velikikh idey.
Strana vsenarodnogo prava,
Na radost' i schast'e lyudey!
Za eto svyashchyonnoe prava,
Za zhizn' i svobodu svoyu
Velikaya nasha derzhava
Vragov pobezhdala v boyu!

Pripev:
Nad Moskvoyu chudesnoy,
Nad lyubimoy zemlyoy.
Leysya, radostnaya pesnya,
Po nashey strane molodoy!
Veysya, krasnoye znamya
Simvol nashikh pobed!
Ty gorish' vsegda nad nami,
Kak solntsa likuyushchiy svet!

Po Leninskim mudrym zavetam
Nas partiya k schast'yu vedot.
I Stalinskoy dumoy sogrety
Strana i Sovetskiy narod.
Nesmetny respublik bogatstva,
I sil bogatyrskikh ne schest'
V strane vsenarodnogo bratstva,
Gde trud — eto doblest' i chest'.

Pripev

Ot dal'ney Sovetskoy granitsy
Do bashen starinnykh Kremlya
Rastut goroda i stanitsy,
Tsvetut zolotyye polya.
I s kazhdym zernom urozhaya,
I s novym udarom stanka
Vso krepnet i krepnet rodnaya,
Velikaya nasha strana!

Pripev

English translation

Long live our State,
The fatherland of great ideas,
The country of public law
To the joy and happiness of the people!
For this sacred right,
For its life and freedom,
Our great State
Defeated enemies in battle!

Chorus:
Over the wonderful Moscow,
Over the favoured land,
Joyful melodies of songs flow
To our young country!
Wave, you red flag
That symbol of our victories!
You glow above us
Like the sun's joyous light!

According to Lenin's wise percepts
Our Party leads us to happiness!
And by Stalinist thought are warmed
The country and the Soviet people!
The republics' wealth do not count
And so do the heroes' forces
In the country of national fraternity
Where labour is valour and honour.

Chorus

From the far Soviet border
Unto the Kremlin ancient towers.
Villages and cities are growing,
And so are the golden fields blooming.
And with every grain harvest
And with a new striking machine
The whole country is growing and becoming stronger,
Our great country!

Chorus

=== Post-Stalinist version ===
After the death of Joseph Stalin, the lines

«По ленинским мудрым советам
Нас партия к счастью ведёт.
И сталинской думой согреты
Страна и советский народ.»

have been replaced with:

«По ленинским мудрым заветам
Живёт наш великий народ.
Дорогою счастья и света
Нас партия мудро ведёт.»
