= 120th Guards Naval Infantry Division =

Russian Naval Infantry unit

120th Guards Belostok Orders of Zhukov, Suvorov and Alexander Nevsky Naval Infantry Division
- 120-я гвардейская Белостокская орденов Жукова, Суворова и Александра Невского дивизия морской пехоты
- Sleeve patch of the 120th Guards Naval Infantry Division
- Active: 1942–present
- Country: Soviet Union (until 1991); Russia
- Branch: Russian Navy
- Type: Naval infantry
- Part of: Baltic Fleet
- Garrison/HQ: Baltiysk
- Engagements: World War II; First Chechen War; Second Chechen War; Syrian Civil War; Russo-Ukrainian War
- Decorations: Guards; Order of Zhukov; Order of Suvorov 3rd class Order of Alexander Nevsky
- Battle honours: Belostok

Commanders
- Current commander: Colonel (Guards) Igor Kalmykov

The 120th Guards Belostok Orders of Zhukov, Suvorov and Alexander Nevsky Naval Infantry Division (Russian: 120-я гвардейская Белостокская орденов Жукова, Суворова и Александра Невского дивизия морской пехоты; Military Unit Number 06017) is a division of the Russian Naval Infantry. The division was formed in December 2025 from the 336th Separate Guards Naval Infantry Brigade, which traces its history back to the Soviet Naval Infantry.

== History ==
=== World War II ===
The 336th Separate Guards Naval Infantry Brigade traces its history back to the creation of the 347th Rifle Regiment of the 308th Rifle Division (2nd formation), which was formed on March 28, 1942, from a cadre provided by the Omsk Infantry School.

The personnel of the regiment was mainly recruited from military men of the military school, residents of the Omsk Region, Altai Territory and Gorny Altai.

At the end of May 1942, the 308th Rifle Division was redeployed to the Volga Military District near the city of Saratov. On August 19, 1942, the division marched to the front and, by September 10, 1942, advanced to the front line and entered into battle with the opponents of the 24th Army, Stalingrad Front, in the area of the Kotluban state farm (to the north-west of Stalingrad).

In the face of the German onslaught, the division retreated into Stalingrad on October 2, 1942, and was re-subordinated to the 62nd Army. The combat positions of the division were in the area of the Barrikady Factory. On November 3, 1942, the 308th RD transferred the defense of the plant to units of the 138th Rifle Division and was withdrawn to the rear.

For its actions at Stalingrad between September and December 1942, the 308th Rifle Division was awarded the Order of the Red Banner by an order dated 19 June 1943. Reassigned to the Volga Military District to be rebuilt, the division spent the next several months reconstituting its strength. By 1 March 1943, the division was shipped back to the front and assigned to the Kalinin Front reserves and then to the 11th Army in the Reserve of the Supreme High Command.

The division went back to the front in the 3rd Army of the Bryansk Front in Operation Kutuzov. Distinguishing itself in combat, the division was awarded Guards status and redesignated the 120th Guards Rifle Division. As a result, the regiment was redesignated as the 336th Guards Rifle Regiment. During the remainder of 1943 the division participated in the Orel, Bryansk, and Gomel–Rechitsa operations.

On 2 August 1944, the regiment was awarded the honorary designation "Białystok" for the liberation of the city of the same name. On 15 September 1945, it was awarded the Order of Suvorov 3rd class, and on 15 April 1945, it received the Order of Alexander Nevsky.

=== Postwar ===
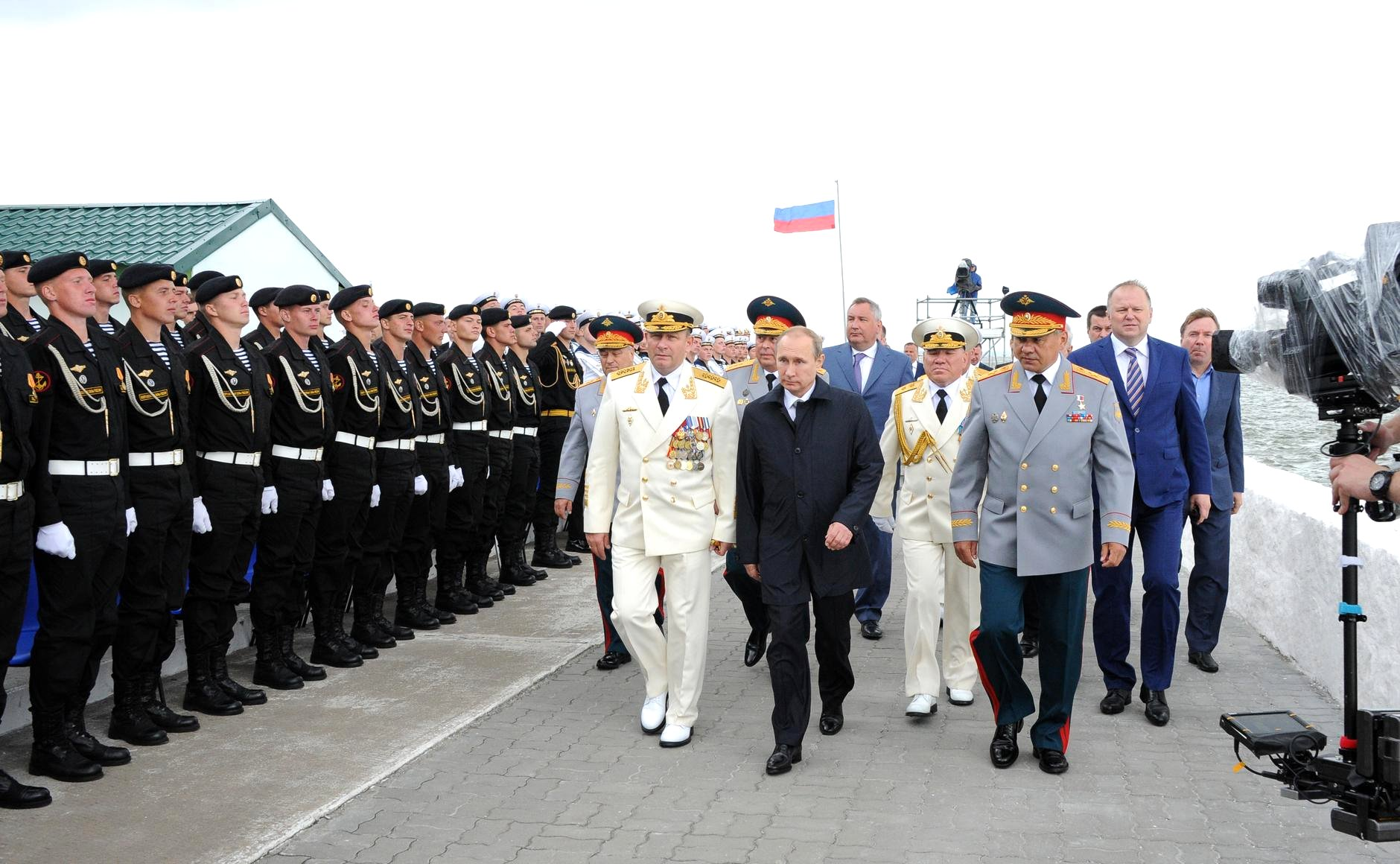
Russian Federation President Vladimir Putin visits the brigade on Navy Day at Baltiysk, 26 July 2015

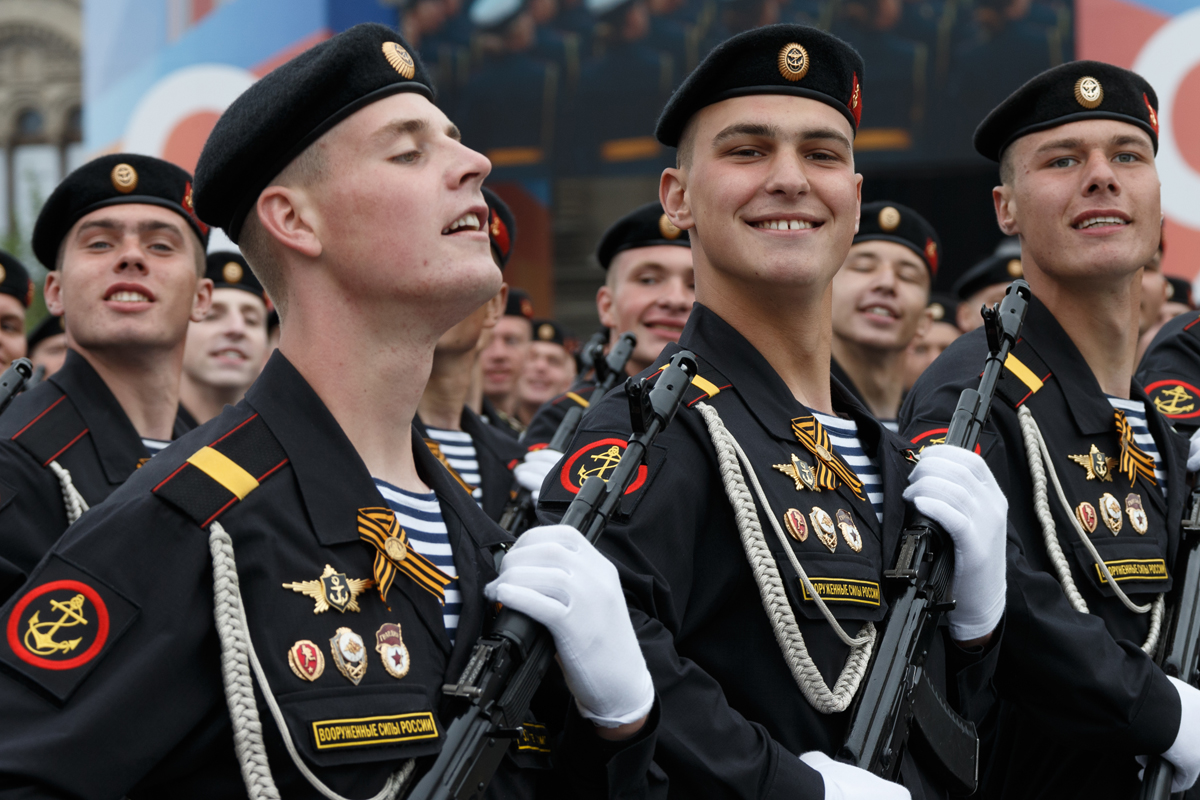
Brigade personnel during the 2019 Moscow Victory Day Parade

After the end of the war, the regiment was relocated to Minsk with the division later in 1945. In 1957, it was converted into the 336th Guards Motor Rifle Regiment when the division became a motor rifle unit. As a result of its performance in exercises, the 336th was chosen to be converted into a specialized naval infantry unit after the Naval Infantry reformed. In accordance with a directive of 7 June 1963, the regiment was ordered converted into the 336th Separate Guards Naval Infantry Regiment in July; it was to be stationed at Baltiysk, Kaliningrad Oblast.

Fielding 1,519 men in peacetime, its structure was not changed when it transferred to the Naval Infantry and it was instead reequipped. The 336th consisted of three battalions of Naval Infantry equipped with the amphibious BTR armored personnel carrier, a tank battalion with two companies of PT-76 amphibious light tanks and a company of T-55 main battle tanks. Artillery support was provided by a battery of BM-21 Grad multiple rocket launchers and a battery of anti-tank guided missiles, while air defense consisted of a platoon of ZSU-23-4 Shilka anti-aircraft guns and a platoon of 9K31 Strela-1 surface-to-air missiles. Support units included support, reconnaissance, engineer, and NBC defense battalions. The conversion took place at Uruchcha, and was completed in June, when the regiment deployed to Baltiysk in echelons.

On 20 November 1979 the regiment was renamed the 336th Separate Guards Naval Infantry Brigade.

The 336th SGNIB has been since 1967 the principal unit of the NI that has taken part in national parades in Red Square of Moscow.

=== Russian invasion of Ukraine ===
Sleeve patch of the 336th Separate Guards Naval Infantry Brigade

The Ukrainian General Staff reported that Russia deployed a battalion tactical group of the 336th Separate Guards Naval Infantry Brigade to "the Crimean direction" on March 10, 2022. On November 5, the brigade was awarded the Order of Zhukov. On 11 June 2023, during the 2023 Ukrainian counteroffensive, the brigade struck a Ukrainian column near the village of Klyuchove.

As of September 2025, elements of the brigade were reportedly operating in the area of Pokrovsk in eastern Ukraine as part of intensified Russian combat operations there. Elements of the brigade had previously been reported as operating in the area of Novopavlivka.

On June 13, 2025, the brigade received a commendation from Russian Minister of Defence Andrey Belousov for the capture of Komar.

In December 2025, the brigade was reformed into the 120th Naval Infantry Division, retaining all its honors and decorations. The number 336 was assigned to the first regiment of the division. The reorganization expanded the former brigade into a divisional formation within the Russian Baltic Fleet, headquartered in Baltiysk, Kaliningrad Oblast.

== Units in the 1980s and 1990s ==
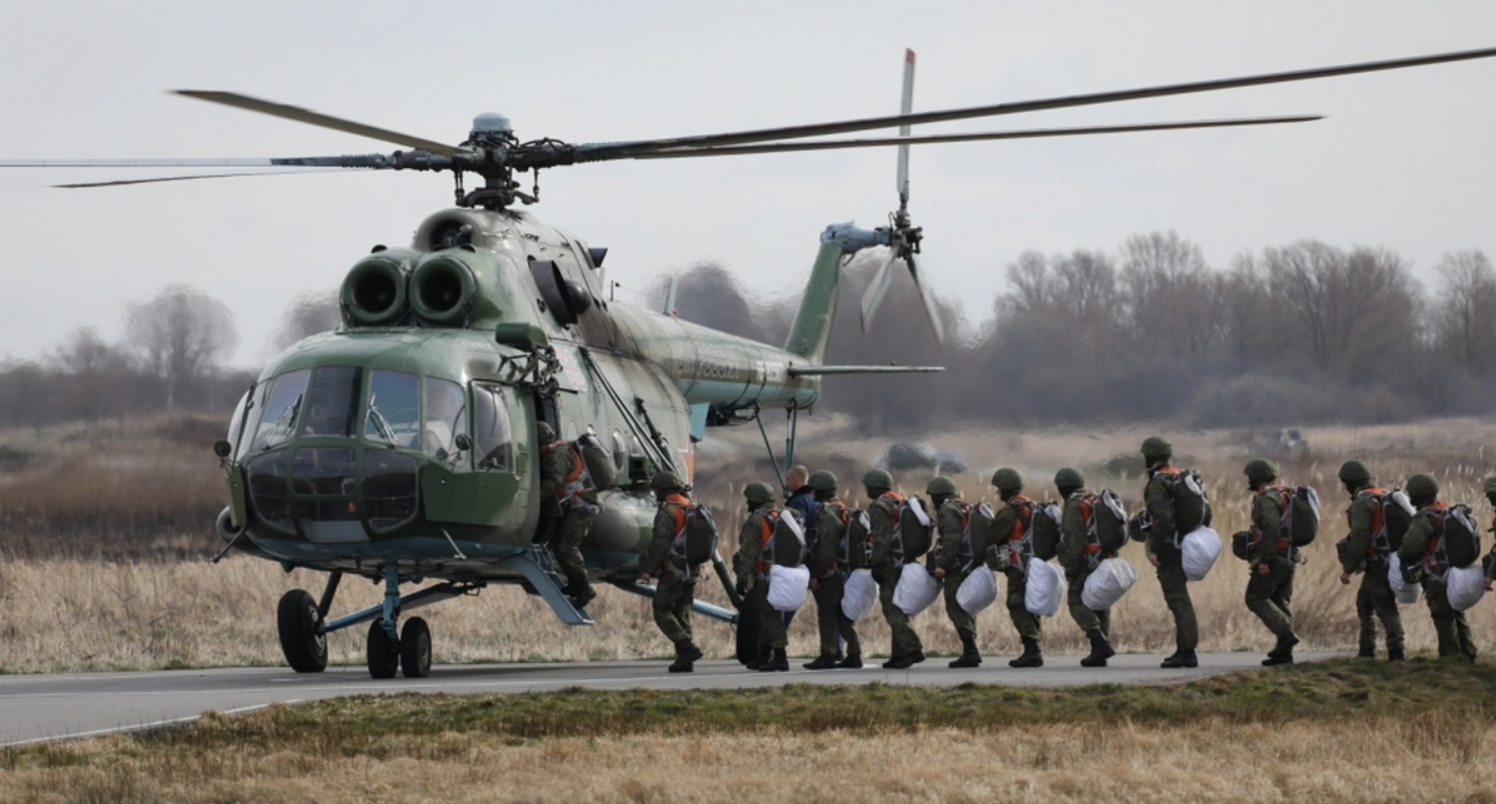
Baltic Fleet naval infantrymen practicing an airborne assault

Brigade Headquarters

- 877th Naval Infantry Battalion
- 878th Naval Infantry Battalion
- 879th Naval Infantry (Air Assault) Battalion
- 884th Naval Infantry Battalion
- 112th Tank Battalion
- 887th Reconnaissance Battalion
- 1612th Artillery Battalion
- 1618th Anti-Aircraft Missile Battalion
- 1615th Multi-Rocket Launcher Artillery Battalion
- 1621st Anti-Tank Artillery Battalion
