= Military-focused secondary schools in Russia =

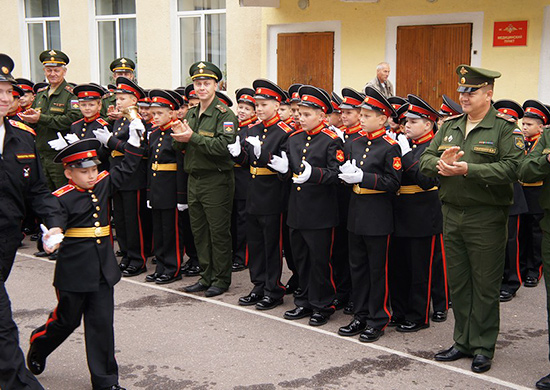
Pupils and teachers of Tver Suvorov Military School

Russian military-focused secondary schools are usual secondary schools conducting secondary general education programme (level 3 according International Standard Classification of Education (ISCED). They provide their pupils with training in additional military-focused subjects. These schools don't prepare military personnel, and their graduates can choose either military or civilian way of life. These schools include: the Suvorov Military Schools, the Nakhimov Naval Schools and the Presidential Cadet Schools.

== Suvorov Schools ==
Under the Ministry of Defence:

- Kazan Suvorov Military School
- Moscow Military Music College
- Moscow Suvorov Military School
- North Caucasus Suvorov Military School
- Perm Suvorov Military School
- Saint Petersburg Suvorov Military School
- Tula Suvorov Military School
- Tver Suvorov Military School
- Ulyanovsk Suvorov Military School
- Ussuriysk Suvorov Military School
- Yekaterinburg Suvorov Military School

Under the Ministry of Internal Affairs:

- Astrakhan Suvorov Military School of the Ministry of Internal Affairs
- Grozny Suvorov Military School of the Ministry of Internal Affairs
- Yelabuga Suvorov Military School of the Ministry of Internal Affairs
- Novocherkassk Suvorov Military School of the Ministry of Internal Affairs
- Saint Petersburg Suvorov Military School of the Ministry of Internal Affairs
- Chita Suvorov Military School of the Ministry of Internal Affairs

== Nakhimov School ==
- Saint Petersburg Nakhimov Naval School (main campus is located in Saint Petersburg, there are branches in Vladivostok, Sevastopol, Kaliningrad, Murmansk) Founded in 1944 and located in St. Petersburg in an impressive baroque building adjacent to the Russian cruiser Aurora, the Navy's oldest commissioned warship and the ship that has been credited with signaling the beginning of the October Revolution, this institution can be considered a naval preparatory school. Successful graduates from its program can directly enter the officer commissioning schools without sitting for the competitive entrance examinations. Originally, the Nakhimov Schools and their army equivalents, the Suvorov Schools, were established to provide education for the sons of officers who perished during the war. There were three Nakhimov Schools (Leningrad-1944, Tbilisi-1944, and Riga-1945) but the Tbilisi and Riga schools were closed in 1955 and 1952, respectively. Only the school in St. Petersburg continues to function until 2016, when the School was expanded to include campuses in major Russian naval base towns.
  - Vladivostok Presidential Cadet School
  - Sevastopol Presidential Cadet School
  - Murmansk Nakhimov Naval School
  - Kaliningrad Nakhimov Naval School

== Presidential Cadet Schools ==
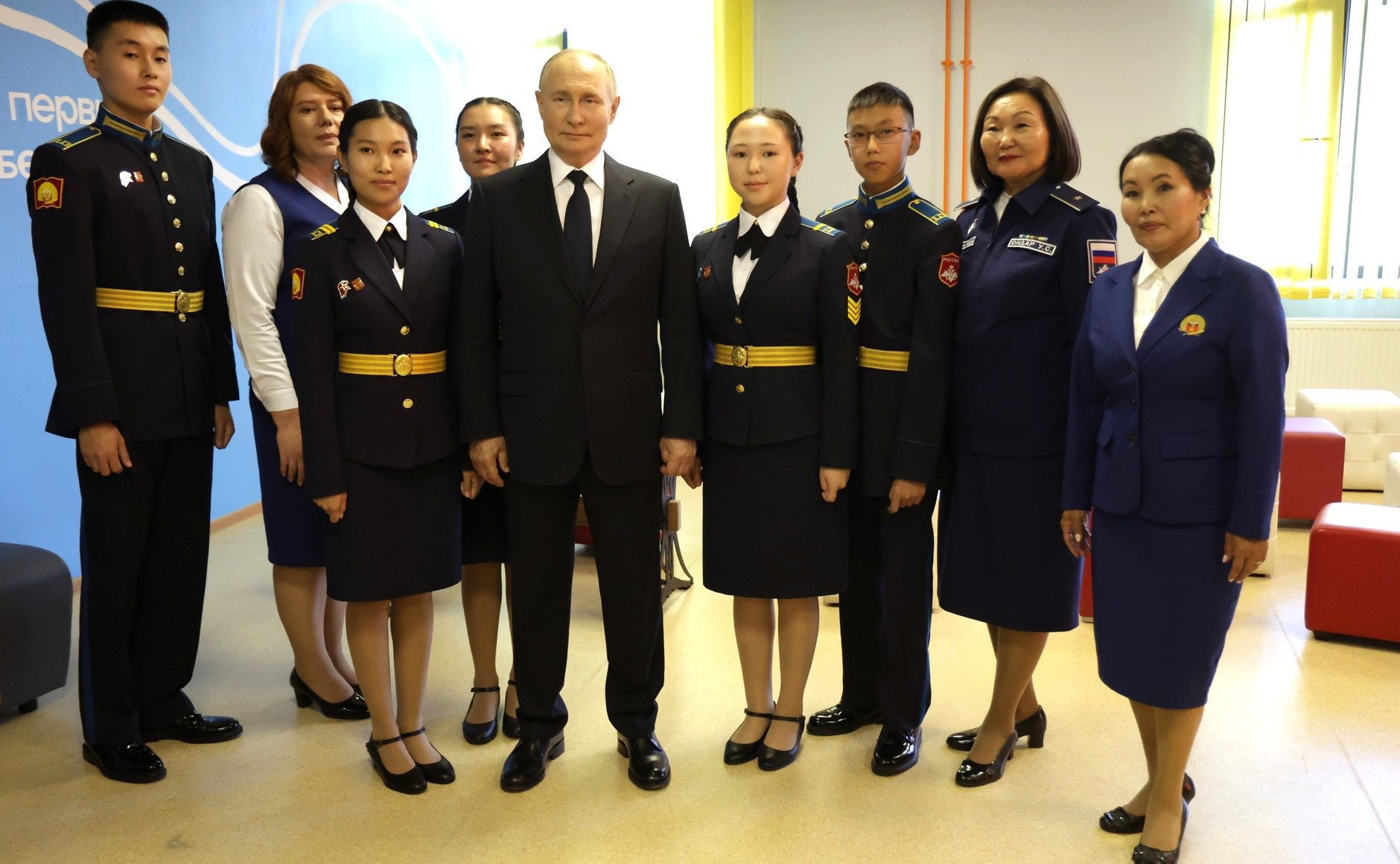
Russian President Vladimir Putin at the Kyzyl Presidential Cadet School in Kyzyl, Tuva, 2 September 2024

Under the Ministry of Defence:

- Moscow National Guard Presidential Cadets School
- Kemerovo Presidential Cadet School
- Krasnodar Presidential Cadet School
- Kyzyl Presidential Cadet School
- Orenburg Presidential Cadet School
- Petrozavodsk Presidential Cadet School
- Stavropol Presidential Cadet School - on the site of the former Stavropol Higher Military Aviation School of Pilots and Navigators PVO
- Tyumen Presidential Cadet School

== Cadet Corps schools ==
Under the Ministry of Defence:

- Aksay Cossack Cadet Corps named after Danilo Efremov
- Kronstadt Sea Cadet Corps - located in Kronshtadt on Kotlin Island this school is for upper grade school aged youths interested in eventually attending the Nakhimov Naval School, a preparatory school for the several officers' commissioning institutions of the Russian Navy.
- Omsk Cadet Military Corps
- Saint Petersburg Cadet Corps
- Cadet Engineering School at the Prof. N. E. Zhukovsky and Yu. A. Gagarin Air Force Academy
- Cadet Sport School at the Military Institute of Physical Culture
- Cadet School of IT-technologies at the Marshal of the Soviet Union S. M. Budyonny Military Signals Academy
- Moscow Female Boarding School of the Ministry of Defence of Russian Federation
- Saint Petersburg Female Boarding School of the Ministry of Defence of Russian Federation

Under the Ministry of Internal Affairs:

- Samara Cadet Corps

== See also ==
- Young Army Cadets National Movement
