= Corps of drums =

Army unit

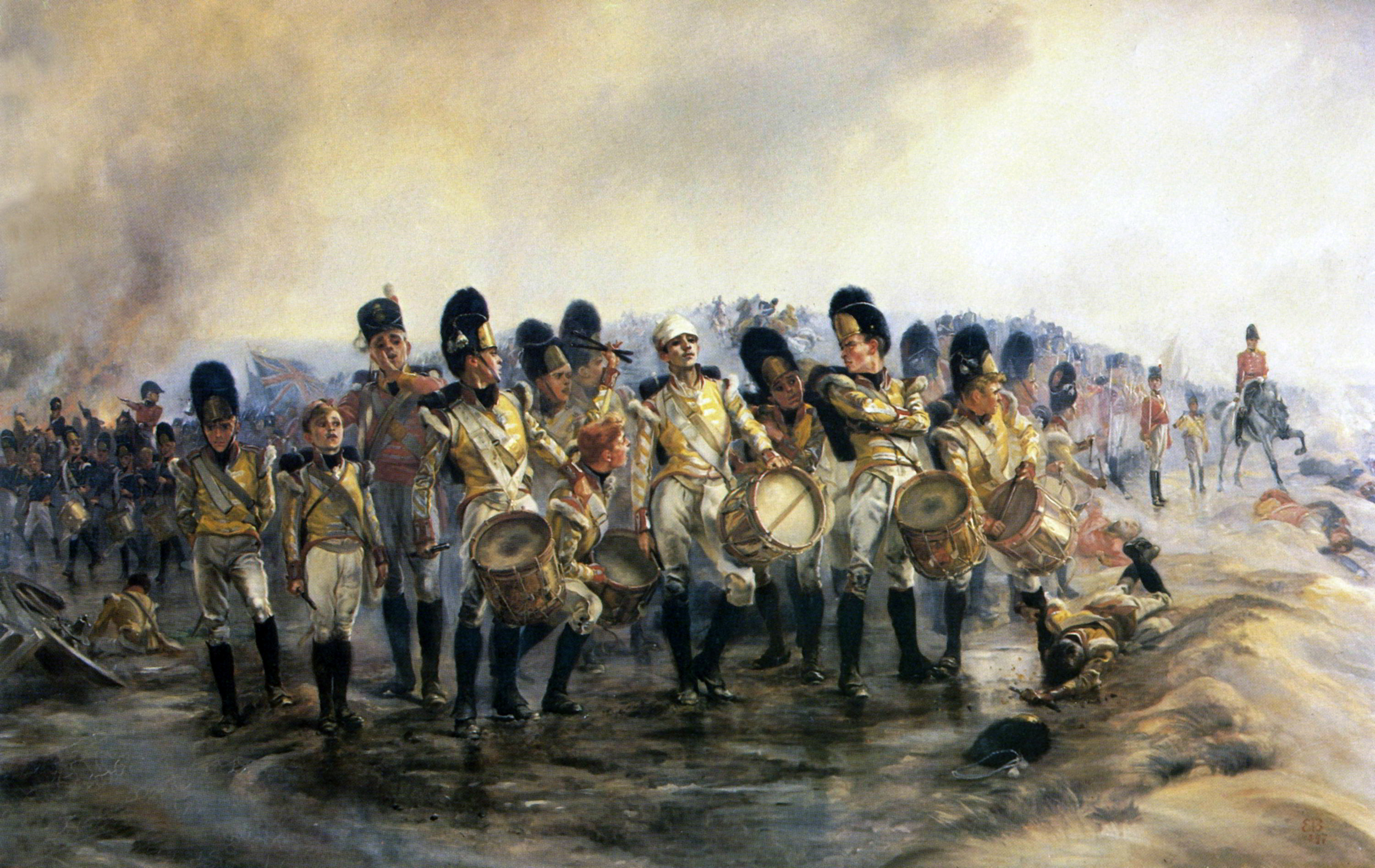
Drummers of the 57th Regiment of Foot at the Battle of Albuera. They are depicted in their distinctive yellow uniforms, which was facing color of the 57th.

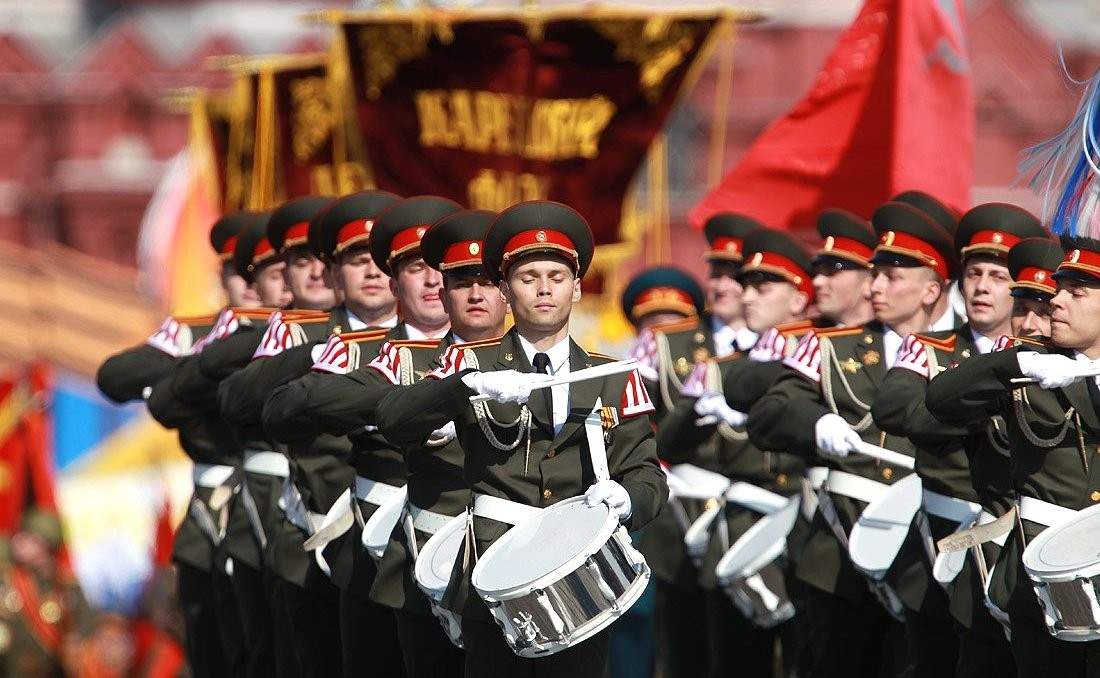
Corps of Drums of the Moscow Military Conservatoire at the Victory Parade on Red Square, 2010.

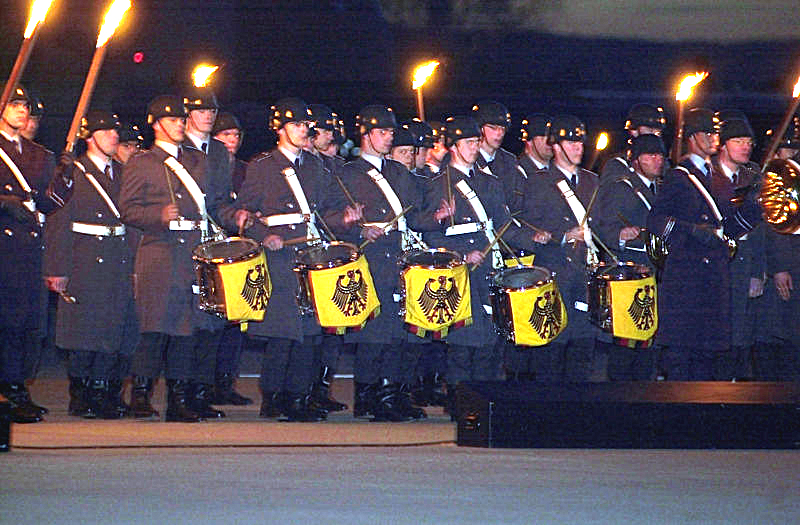
Corps of Drums at a tattoo (Großer Zapfenstreich) in Germany, 2002.

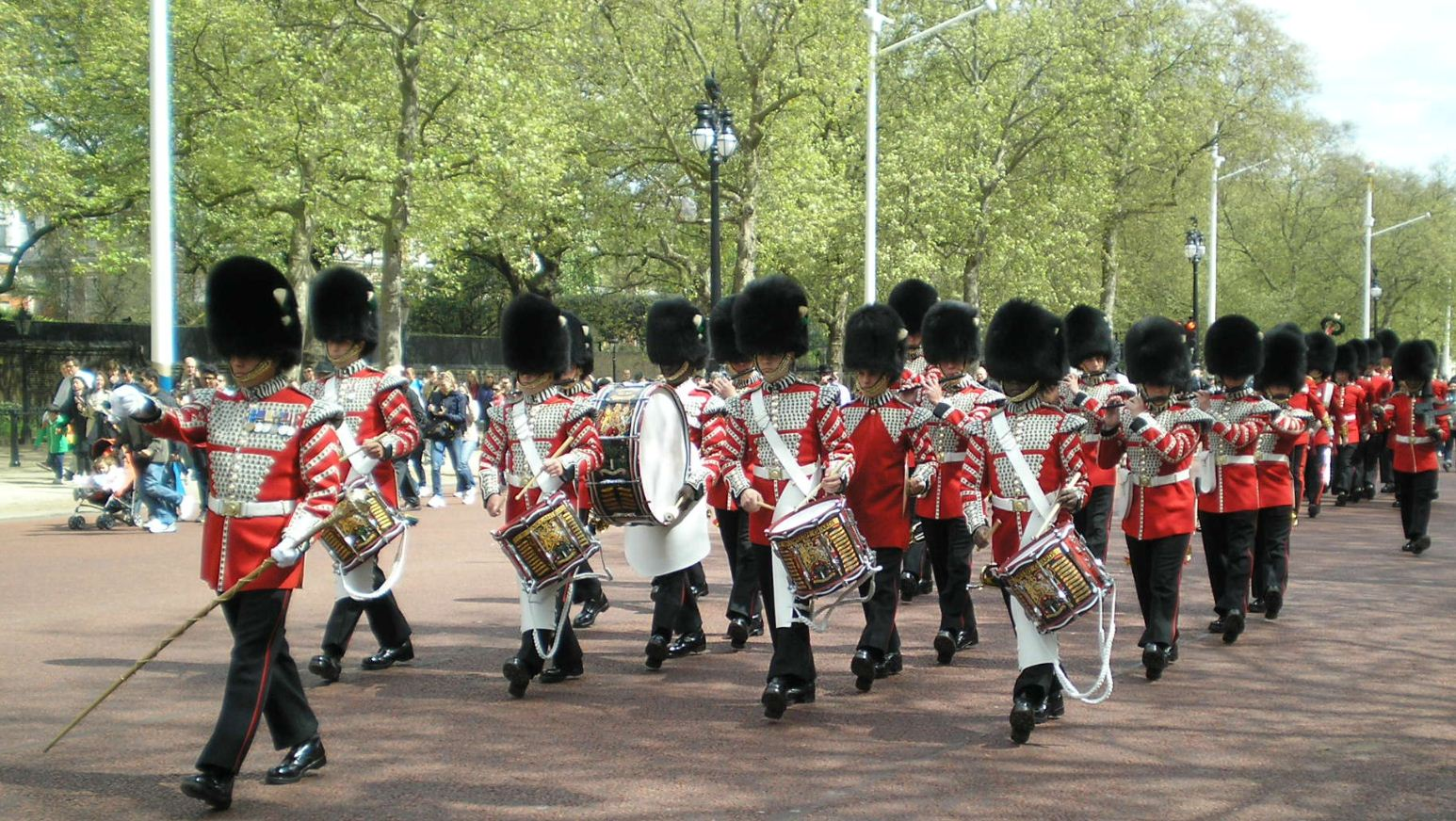
British Corps of Drums.

A corps of drums, sometimes known as a fife and drum corps or simply field music, is a traditional European military music formation. Historically, a Corps of Drums' primary role was communication. Today, the primary role of a Corps of Drums is ceremonial, performing in parades and military ceremonies. Besides drums, this formation may contain a variety of instruments, including trumpets, bugles, and fifes.

== Origin ==
Instruments, particularly drums, have been used on battlefields as signaling devices across many different cultures. Unlike army musicians who form bands and are usually limited to auxiliary duties in wartime, drummers in a Corps of Drums are principally fully trained infantry soldiers, with recruitment as drummers coming after standard infantry training.

Its history can be traced back to Swiss mercenaries in the early Renaissance. By the early 16th century, each company of infantry soldiers had a single drummer and a single fife player. These two musicians would march at the head of the company, and when not providing uplifting marching tunes, they would be used by the company commander to convey orders on and off the battlefield. The drummers would be more aptly described as signalers than musicians, as shouted orders were very hard to hear over the din of battle. Later, the bugle would become the preferred means of communication on the battlefield, and the drummers adapted; they started training on bugles and carrying them in battle while retaining the drum and the title of drummer.

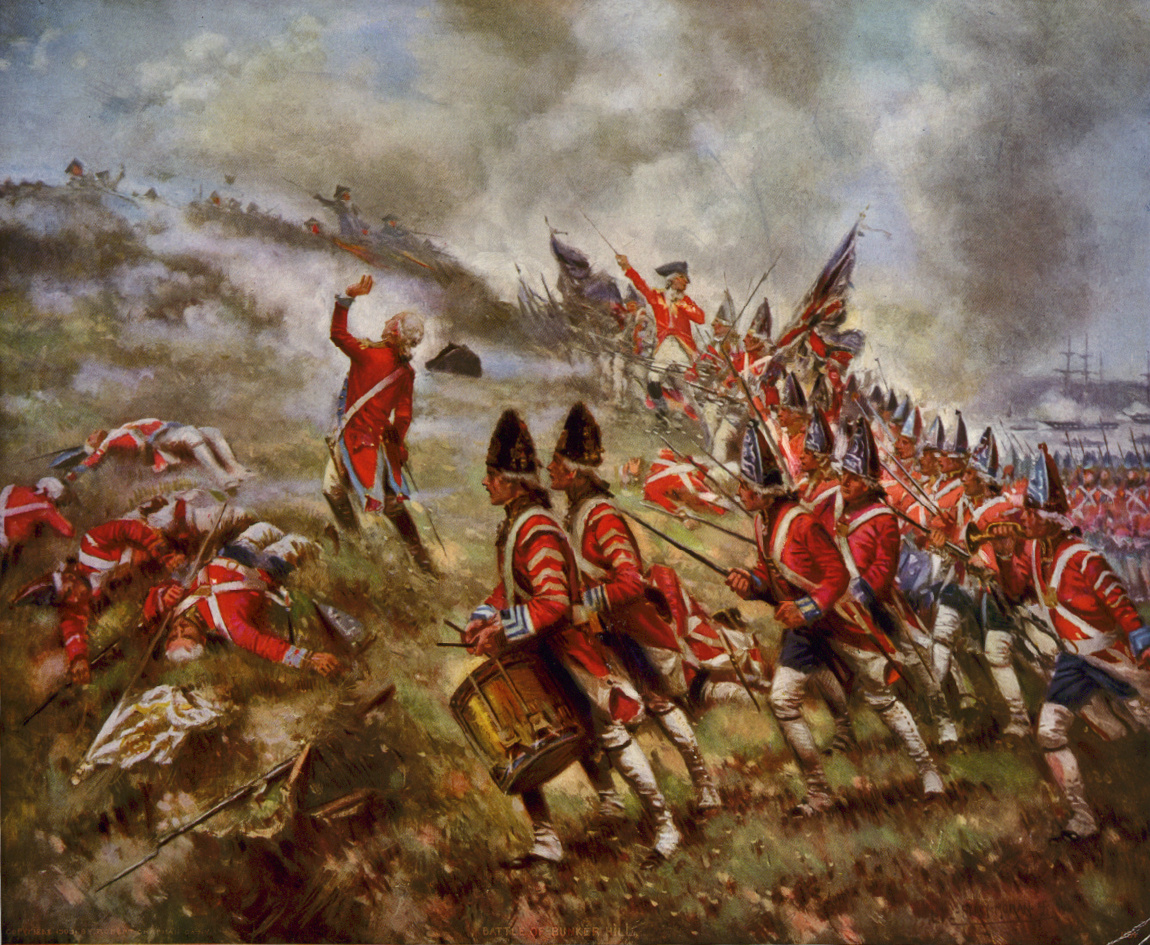
Drummers in the center foreground, in their original battlefield role, close to the officer and wearing the distinctive drummers uniform.

As time went on, the individual drummers and fife players would be organized at the battalion level instead of the company level. Thus, the Corps of Drums became attached to the battalion headquarters. They retained their role in each company in battle but would form one body of men at the head of a battalion on the march. A Drum Major (the equivalent of a Sergeant Major for the drummers) was appointed to be in charge of the drummers and organize training in the emerging discipline of military drumming. When off duty, the Corps of Drums would carry out various roles within the battalion, such as administering military justice and ensuring soldiers' billets were secured. The Corps would deploy with the rest of the battalion and would often form specialist platoons such as assault pioneers, supporting fire, or force protection.

== United Kingdom ==
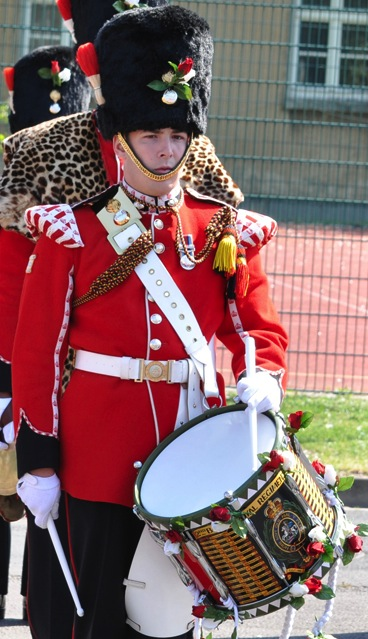
Lee Rigby (1987–2013) was a Drummer in the Royal Regiment of Fusiliers.

The British Army maintains a Corps of Drums in each infantry battalion except for the Scottish, Irish, and Rifle regiments (The Rifles and the Royal Gurkha Rifles) which have pipes and drums and bugles, respectively. Each battalion of a regiment of line infantry maintains a Corps of Drums, which may be massed together on certain occasions. All corps-of-drums soldiers are called drummers (shortened to 'Dmr') regardless of the instrument they play, similar to the use of the term "sapper" for soldiers of the Royal Engineers.

=== Current role ===
Personnel who form the Corps of Drums are recruited from the whole battalion and are usually attached to the battalion headquarters. Each Corps of Drums is commanded by a drum major, a senior non-commissioned officer, who usually reports to the adjutant of the battalion.

==== Historical duties ====
Historical duties such as uncasing and casing of the colors on parade are continued in most units. Due to the specialist duties and ceremonial aspects of a drummer's life, a Corps of Drums may be the unofficial custodian of regimental customs and traditions.

==== Liaison work ====
Because the Corps of Drums' role on the battlefield was originally to signal orders, some units are organized into signal platoons for operating radios. Drummers would also accompany officers to meet officers of an opposing army to parley. Therefore, some Corps of Drums perform a liaison role.

==== Extra work ====
In armies where Corps of Drums remained as bodies within infantry battalions, Corps members have assumed additional jobs such as delivering mail or designating billets, and are often given the role of assault pioneers or supporting-fire (machine gun) platoons.

==== Musician ====
Eventually, as the use of musical instruments on the battlefield diminished, the Corps of Drums looked to fill specialist roles within the battalion while still retaining their original role for ceremonial purposes.

=== Drums and Drum Alternatives ===
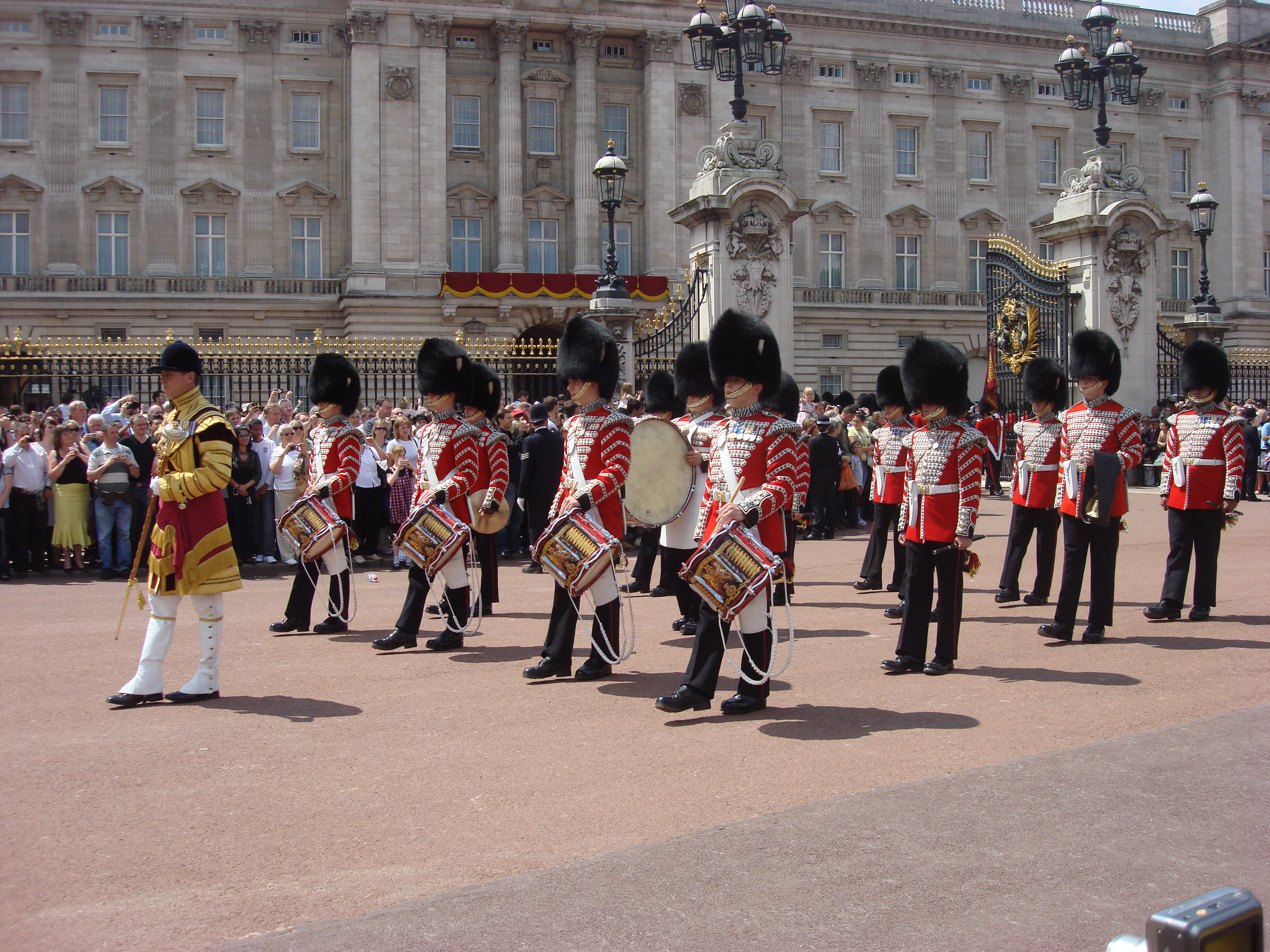
The Corps of Drums of 1st Battalion Grenadier Guards marching away from the forecourt of Buckingham Palace.

The main instrument featured in a Corps of Drums is the side drum. These were originally of a rope-tension design with wide wooden hoops, a wooden shell, and an animal-skin head. In the British Army, this model has been continuously upgraded, with the inclusion of snares, more modern metal rod-tension, nylon hoops, and plastic heads.

The side drum was increasingly decorated throughout the 19th century, until it bore the fully embellished regimental colours of the battalion, including its battle honours. As such, a regiment's drums are often afforded respect.

Historically, all members of a Corps of Drums would beat the various calls on the drum, but some would also play a fife in order to provide melody to accompany long route marches when not in combat. This has been replaced in the modern British Army by the five-key flute.

When the bugle replaced the drum mid-way through the 19th century as the most common means of battlefield communication, it was sounded on parade to give certain orders, to offer salutes, or to play the "Last Post" (or "Taps") at funerals.

As the musical role of a Corps of Drums became more ceremonial in the 19th and 20th centuries, more instruments were added for a more musically complete sound. A modern Corps of Drums may include a range of percussion instruments such as a bass drum, tenor drums, cymbals, and occasionally glockenspiels to fill out the sound.

=== Uniform ===
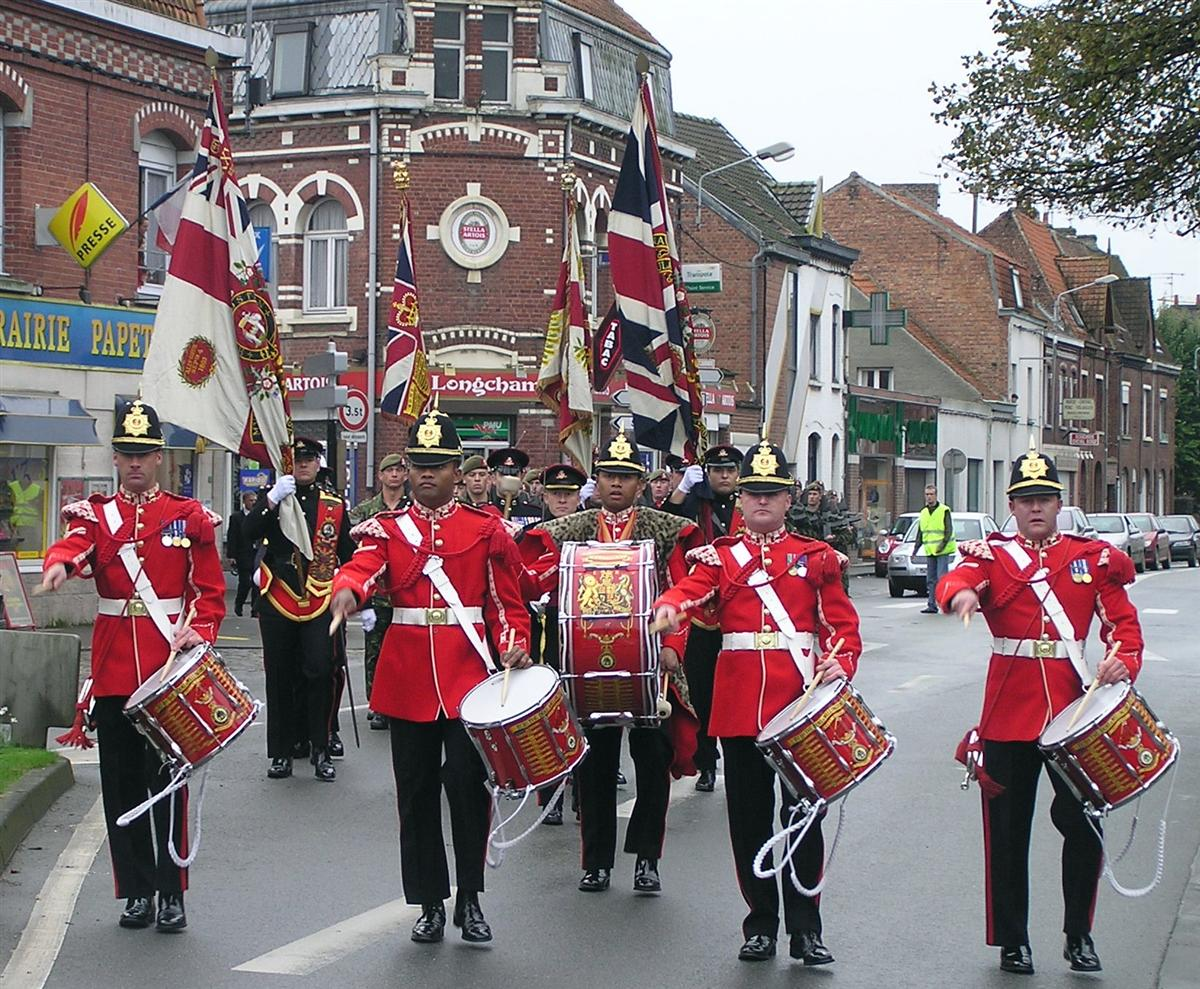
A corps of drums of the Duke of Wellington's regiment (since amalgamated into the Yorkshire Regiment).

While the Corps of Drums in the British Army often parade in combat uniforms and other forms of dress, they will sometimes parade in the full dress uniform, being one of the few formations which regularly wear full dress. During the 18th century, most British Army drummers were distinguished by wearing their regimental uniforms in "reversed colors," so an infantry regiment wearing red coats with yellow facings would clothe its drummers in yellow coats with red facings. This practice tended to make drummers targets in battle.

After 1812, it was replaced by less conspicuous distinctions. These often consisted of lace decorating the standard uniform in various patterns. Many early patterns consisted of a "Christmas tree" pattern in which the chest was covered in horizontal pieces of lace decreasing in width downwards and chevrons of lace down each sleeve. The modern infantry pattern in the British Army is "crown-and-inch" lace sewn over the seams down the sleeves, around the collar, and over the seams on the back of the tunic. The crown-and-inch lace itself is about 1/2 inch (13 mm) thick with a repeating crown pattern. The Guards Divisions drummers have the old-style "Christmas tree" pattern, featuring a fleurs-de-lis instead of crowns.

In some regiments, it has become customary for the percussion rank to wear leopard skins over their uniform. This protects both the uniform and the instrument, as cymbals have to be muffled against the chest, which may leave marks on the cloth, and the drums may be scratched by uniform buttons. Modern "leopard skins" are made from synthetic fur. Other regiments opt for a simple leather or cloth apron.

Drummers have traditionally been armed with "drummers' swords", a shortsword with a simple brass hilt bearing the Royal Cypher. The practice of wearing swords has been discontinued by some regiments, though many still do carry swords, whilst some use an SA80 bayonet as a modern alternative.

=== Honorable Artillery Company ===
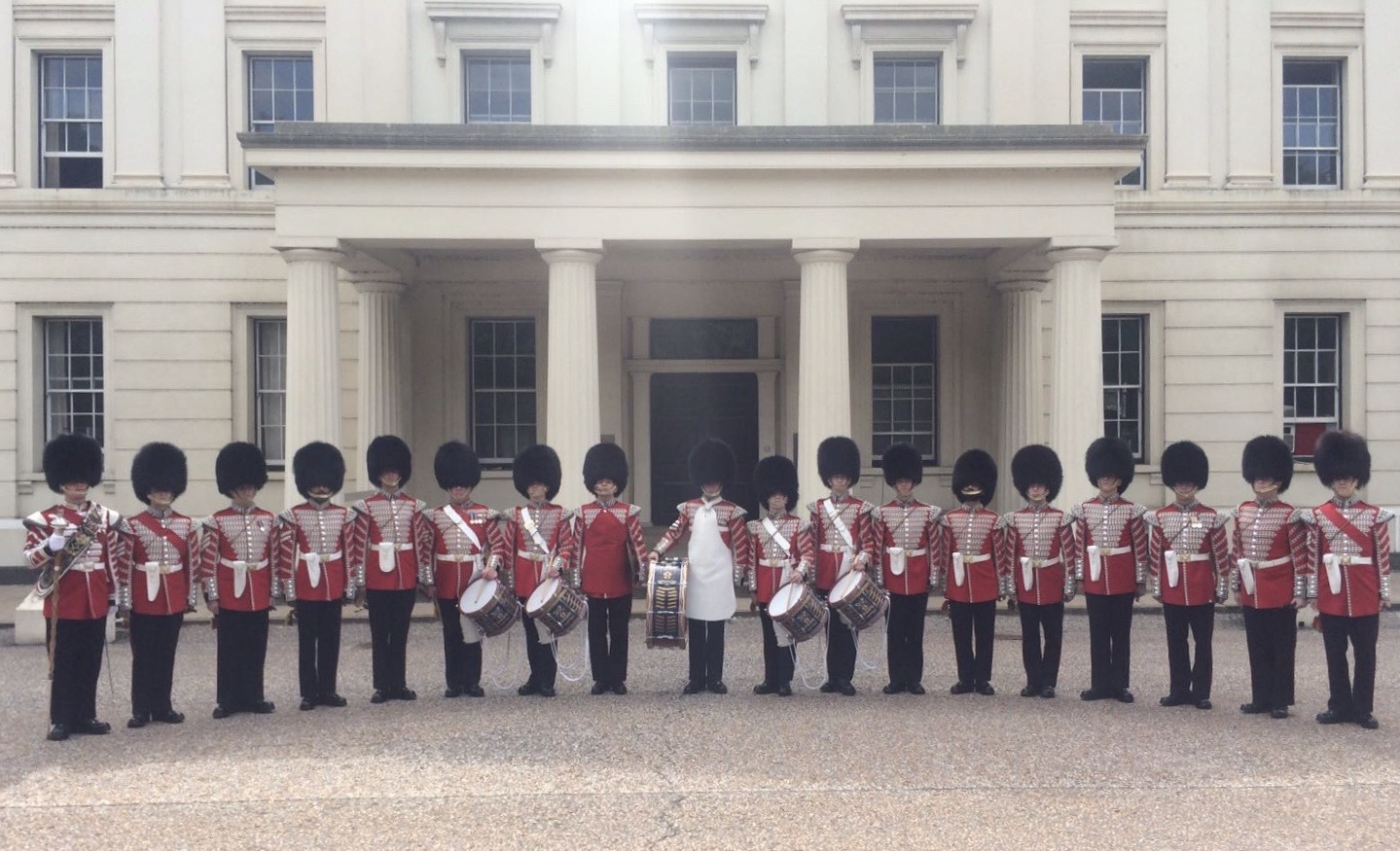
The Corps of Drums of the Honourable Artillery Company at Wellington Barracks.

The Honourable Artillery Company (HAC) maintains a Corps of Drums, and as such is the only such sub-unit in an artillery unit in the British Army. Although the Honourable Artillery Company now fulfills an artillery role, it was historically an infantry regiment, with two battalions fighting during the Great War. The last infantry battalion was disbanded in 1973, but the Corps of Drums remained. Just as in other Corps of Drums of the British Army, its personnel carry out a soldiering role as their main function.

Since the HAC is the oldest unit in existence in the British Army, and as drummers were employed at the establishment of infantry units at the latest during the 16th century, it may be assumed that the Corps of Drums of the HAC is the oldest in the British Army, though it has not been in continuous existence.

As the regiment still maintains the privilege granted to it by King William IV in 1830, that the HAC should dress in similar uniforms as the Grenadier Guards, except wearing silver where the Grenadiers wear gold, the Corps of Drums of the HAC dresses in a very similar fashion to that of the Corps of Drums of the Grenadier Guards.

In addition, the HAC's veteran unit, the Company of Pikemen and Musketeers, maintains an early form of the Corps of Drums known as the 'Musik'. In this capacity, more basic fifes and larger rope-tension drums are used, and 17th-century uniforms are worn in keeping with the rest of the company.

=== Royal Logistic Corps ===
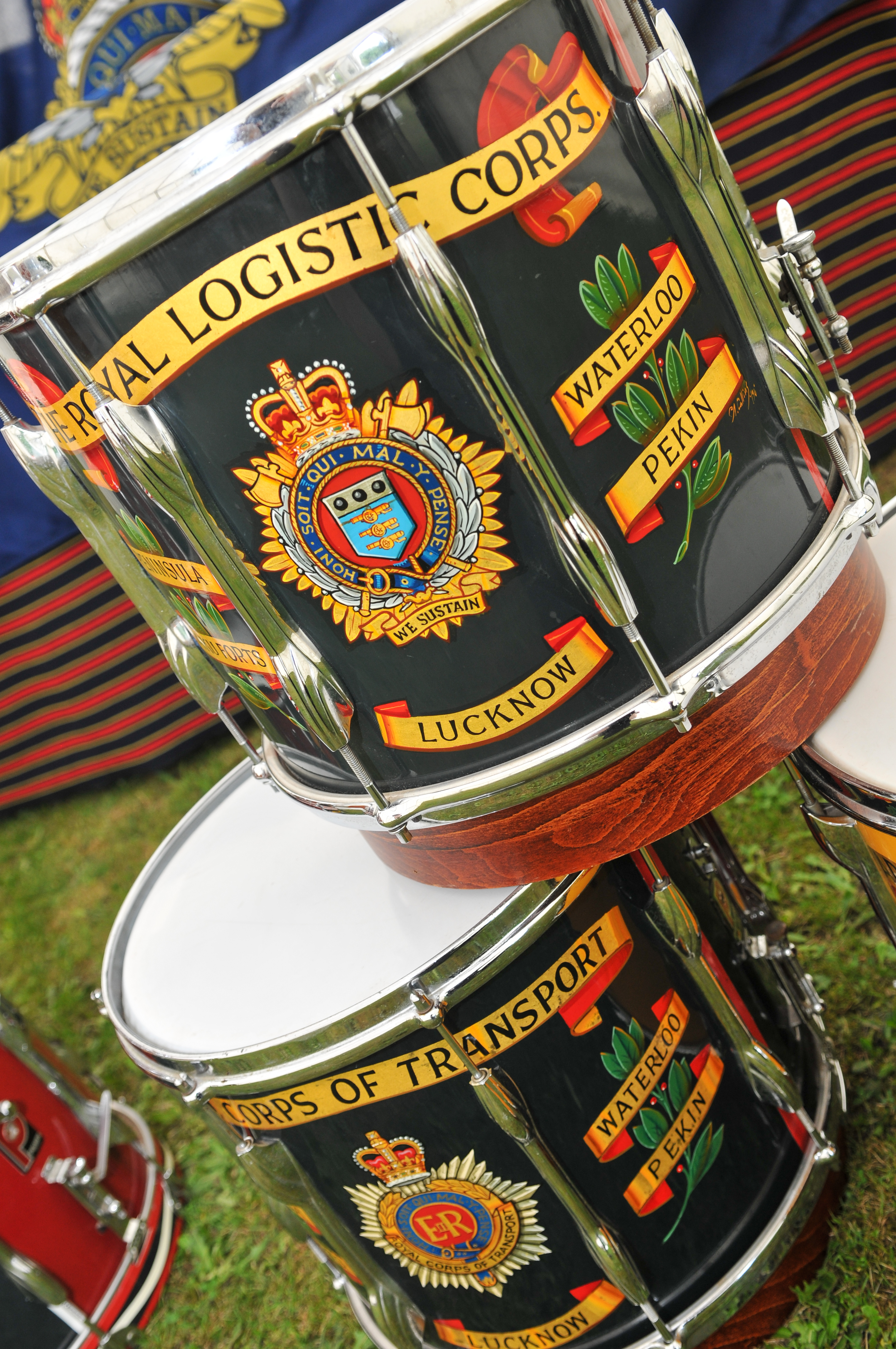
RLC Drums with Battle honors.

The Royal Logistic Corps (RLC) also maintains a Corps of Drums in the form of several side drummers, drawn from soldiers who serve a short tour as drummers before returning to a field unit. They stem from the 12 drummers placed on the Royal Waggon Train (RWT) in 1803. There are reserve soldiers within the Corps of Drums of 157 Regiment RLC, based in Cardiff in Wales. This is not a conventional Corps of Drums, as it has no flautists and comes under the command of the regimental headquarters of the RLC, rather than forming a separate entity. It frequently plays with the Band of the RLC but often performs in isolation.

At the time of Waterloo, in the period of deployment to the Low Countries, the RWT introduced drums made of brass. These originated on the Indian subcontinent. The size is 14 by 12 inches (360 by 300 mm). They weighed 16 pounds (7.3 kg). They were faced in blue and carried the cypher of King George, with the title below. A few drums from the period survive today. The drumsticks were of Canadian maple, following the campaigns in North America during the Napoleonic era. The drums had drag ropes purchased from unit funds. Whilst drummers carried the bugle, the common instrument for the "Waggoners" was the fanfare trumpet, on account of their cavalry traditions and inclusion in the light cavalry. During that period the Corps was then divided between the foot soldiers, who used drums and fifes, and the mounted soldiers, with cavalry fanfare trumpets as signaling instruments. The drum sling was still that of the hook.

=== Royal Marines ===
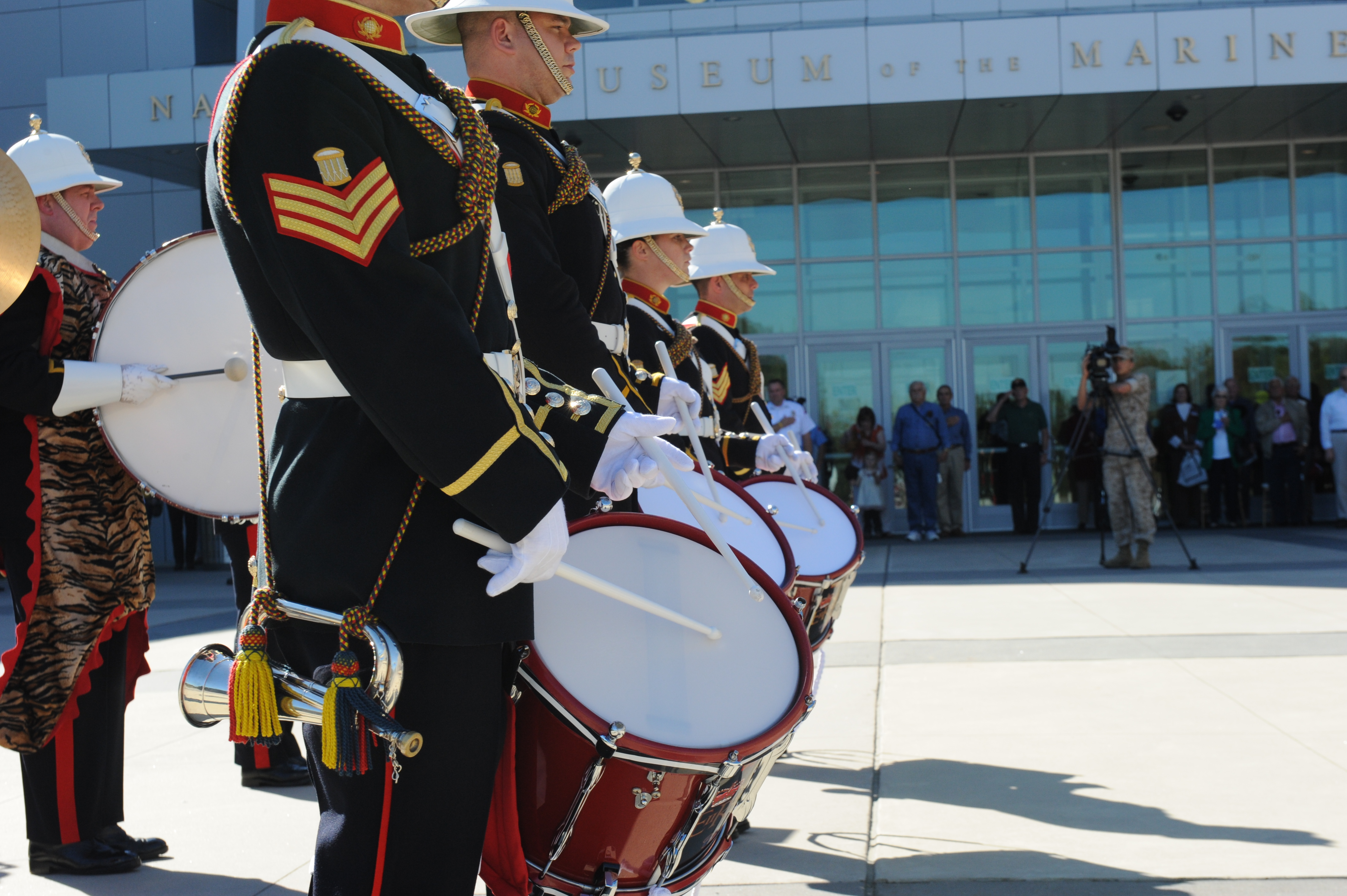
Royal Marines Corps of Drums.

Royal Marines Bands are led by 'buglers', who are trained on both the side drum, the bugle, and the Herald Fanfare Trumpet (natural trumpet). This section of the band is referred to as "the Corps of Drums", which since 1903 is now situated at the front of the band. Whilst similar to the Army Corps of Drums, these are members of the Royal Marines Band Service (RMBS), and they retain their own rank structure. Members of the RMBS are primarily musicians; however, they also carry out secondary roles such as medics, drivers, and force protection when required to, like their Army counterparts.

RM buglers have a history similar to Army 'drummers' in that they were used to convey orders on a ship on drums and bugles, and would then mass onshore into a Corps of Drums, though they were still expected to work as individual soldiers, also known in slang by the Royal Navy as drummers.

These drummer-buglers trace themselves back to the raising of the Royal Marines in 1664 as a maritime foot regiment, with six drummers attached to its battalions.

==== History of Maritime Drummers ====
In 1664, drums were assigned in the raising of the Duke of York's and Albany's Maritime Regiment of Foot, the Admiral's Regiment. The regiment's 1,200 personnel had six snare drummers per company, the ancestors of the corps of drums of the Royal Marines Band Service. The Holland Regiment soon came after them. They were later to be called The Buffs, the Old Buffs, and Howards' Buffs.

The 1702 formation of the marine and sea-service foot regiments saw the drummers' greatest action at Gibraltar, when they played the drums to support their regiments.

The War of Jenkins' Ear saw into action ten British marine regiments and an all-American marine regiment, all were units whose drummers and fifers played alongside their units.

Even though part of the British Army—which in the 18th century was led by the War Office, the Board of Ordnance, and the Commissariat—marines were naval units. Royal Navy officers were at one point part of the marines. Due to two laws that regulated them and other army and navy units, marine drummers faced confusion over what drum calls to perform, for what branch, and on what occasion they might be required to drum.

In 1755, this issue was resolved. The Admiralty took over what was then called His Majesty's Marine Forces (HMMF). At first Royal Navy officers filled the officer ranks, with lieutenant-colonel being the highest relevant rank; in 1771 a promotion to colonel occurred for the first time in the HMMF.

After their formation, the HMMF's drummers and fifers of the three marine divisions played alongside their fellow soldiers in various landings worldwide on behalf of the Royal Navy. They joined their units in the American War of Independence, and a drummer was at James Cook's service during his sea travels.

At Admiral John Jervis's insistence, by King George III's order of 1802, the HMMF was transformed into the HMMF-Royal Marines (HMMF-RM). Two years later, bomb vessel crews and gunners became part of the newly created Royal Marine Artillery (RMA), in which bugle calls became a regular part of life.

The Royal Navy in the 19th century was short of manpower in both the HMMF-RM and the RMA. For this, Army units joined the HMMF-RM as replacement units, carrying not only their drummers and fifers but also buglers.

In 1855, during the units' service in the Crimean War, the HMMF-RM's foot units became one under the unified title of Royal Marines Light Infantry, later known as the Royal Marine Light Infantry (HMLI). Bugles replaced drums as signalers and order beaters, but the latter would be still useful for drills. They were then known as drummers and buglers, and from 1867, the HMLI/RMA drummers were called "buglers" only. These buglers served individually in ships, the Royal Navy's shore establishments, and artillery units, and were massed into Corps of Drums for their units on the ground. Fifes eventually disappeared in usage. By then, a bugler playing both the drum and bugle to sound orders and calls was a common sight in the HMLI and RMA. By the 1890s, buglers also trained in herald and fanfare trumpets became commonplace in HMLI and RMA bases and facilities.

A 1902 incident changed the buglers forever. A Coronation Review at Aldershot was due soon, and the Senior Bandmaster of the HMLI, Lieutenant George Miller, asked his fellow bandmasters to find buglers for his band for the review. At a church parade the next day, he asked 30 HMLI buglers to front the HMLI Massed Bands. They then marched to his arrangement of "Onward Christian Soldiers". The formation used in this march would become an HMLI and RMA standard formation, and the precision stick drills that Miller implemented became a permanent fixture in military events where the HMLI and RMA were present. In 1903, when the RM began operating the Royal Naval School of Music (RNSoM), they too implemented this formation. The formation would inspire those utilized by modern military bands of countries such as Australia, Singapore, Malaysia, and Brunei.

In 1950, the RNSoM became today's Royal Marines School of Music (RMSoM), and the Royal Naval bands were dissolved. Annual, triannual, and eventually biannual beating retreats for both the Royal Marine bands and the RM Corps of Drums buglers began at Horse Guards Parade, Portsmouth, and other venues. By the 1950s, only the band carried the corps at the lead, as a separate Corps of Drums, which played only bugles alongside the drums, were discontinued altogether. By 1978, the Royal Marines Band Service (RMBS) would also feature buglers. By the 1990s, however, only five RM Corps of Drums remained. After the Deal Depot and the Chatham band dissolved in 1996 and the 1940s respectively, three Corps remained at the Royal Navy bases in Portsmouth, Plymouth, and at the Britannia Royal Naval College, as well as one in the RMSoM, and another one in Scotland at HMS Caledonia.

Today there are six RM Bands (plus the training company, RMSoM Junior Musicians and Buglers) remaining in the UK. They are located in Portsmouth (three in HMS Nelson, which includes the RMSoM), Fareham (HMS Collingwood), Plymouth (HMS Raleigh), Lympstone (Commando Training Centre Royal Marines), and Scotland (HMS Caledonia) for a total of seven bands and attached Corps of Drums. All members of the RMBS are trained at the Royal Marines School of Music (HMS Nelson). Buglers' training lasts two years. Basic military skills are taught during four months of initial military training and, if successful, trainee buglers are instructed on the bugle, drum, and herald and fanfare trumpets. Musical skills are refined and supported with additional lessons in music theory and aural perception. Parade work forms a large part of the curriculum and considerable time is spent developing personal drills and bearing.

Today's RM Corps of Drums consists of approximately 60 buglers who carry out duties ranging from repatriation services (Last Post and Reveille), mess beatings (drum displays), beating retreats (marching displays), and concerts on behalf of the Royal Marines and the entire Royal Navy.

==== Instruments and leadership ====
In the British Army, military snare drums (MSD) are the principal instrument of the Corps of Drums; however, the bugle serves an important role as well. Bass drums are often used during parades and drum displays, while cymbals and single tenor drums are used during parades and ceremonies only. Herald Fanfare trumpets (natural trumpets) are also performed on some occasions. The Corps is led by a drum major and a bugle major serves as the principal player.

=== Drummer's Color ===
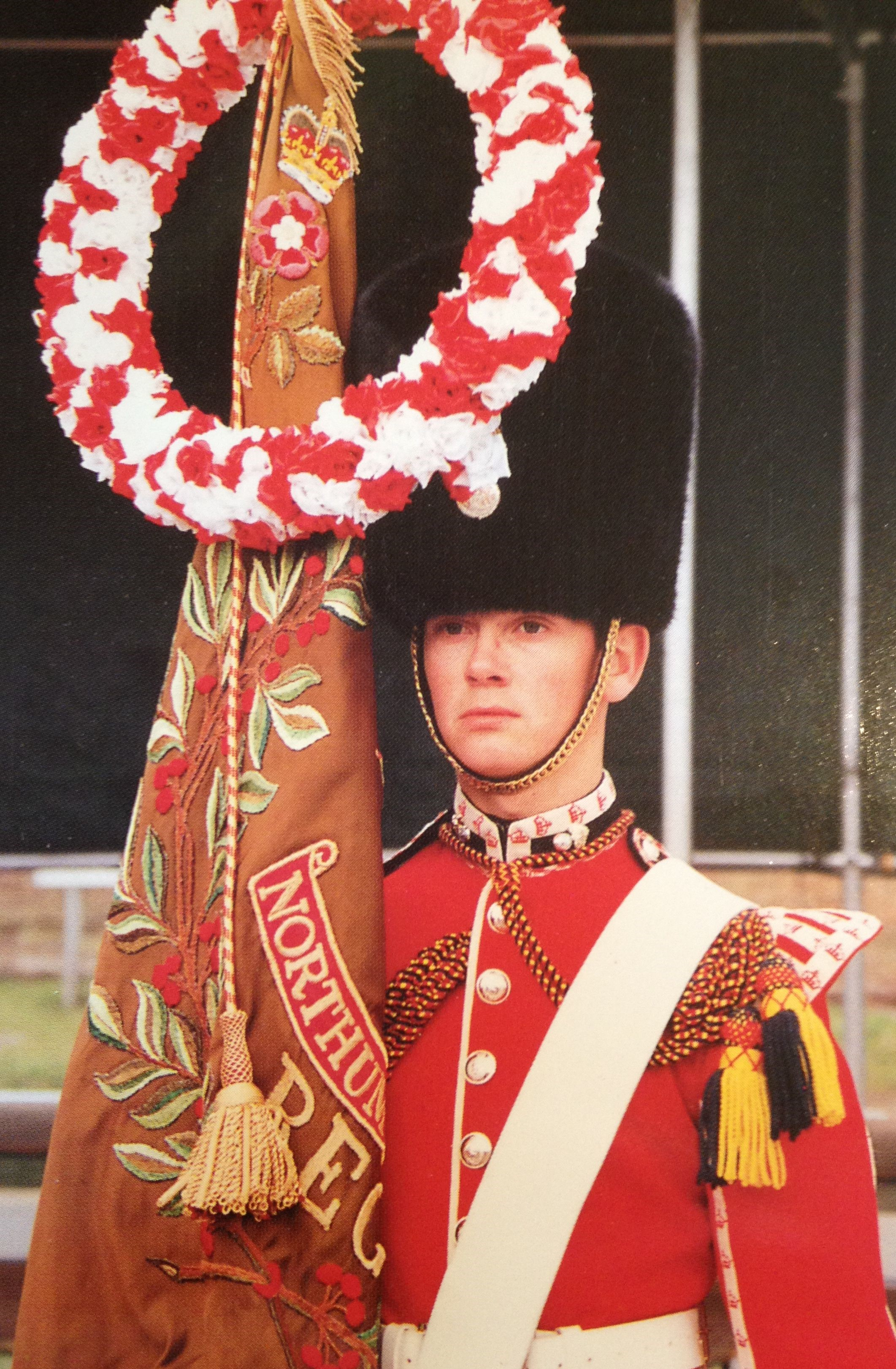
A drummer of the Royal Regiment of Fusiliers holds the Drummer's Color.

The Drummer's Color, also known as the Wilhelmsthal Color, is a unique color held by 1st Battalion, Royal Regiment of Fusiliers. A drummer, usually the youngest in the battalion, is detailed to carry it when it is on parade.

==== History ====
At the battle of Wilhemstahl in 1762, the 5th Foot led the center column under the command of Prince Ferdinand of Brunswick. During this action, they captured the color of an opposing French regiment and took a large number of prisoners. After this date, the regiment carried a small green silk banner in addition to their usual stand of colors to commemorate the one they captured. This was destroyed along with the Regimental Color by a fire in the Officer's Mess in 1833. Despite representations made to King William IV, a request to replace the Drummer's Color following the fire was refused. However, the regiment continued to parade a replacement and was granted specific permission to do so by King George V in 1933.

Since then, a drummer has been entrusted with carrying the color. This is unique within infantry regiments of the British Army, since colors are normally only entrusted to commissioned officers, except when they are in the custody of sergeants to convey them to an ensign. The Drummer's Color is typically paraded only on St. George's Day, unlike the other colors of the regiment, which are used more frequently. On this day, it is decorated with red and white roses, in keeping with regimental custom (which sees all members of the regiment wear the roses in their headdress on this day). The drums of the Corps of Drums and the drum major's staff are also similarly decorated.

When the Royal Northumberland Fusiliers combined with other regiments to form the Royal Regiment of Fusiliers in 1968, the tradition of carrying the Drummer's Color was maintained by the 2nd Battalion. When this battalion was dissolved in 2014, as a result of the Strategic Defence and Security Review 2010, the Drummer's Color was passed to the 1st Battalion.

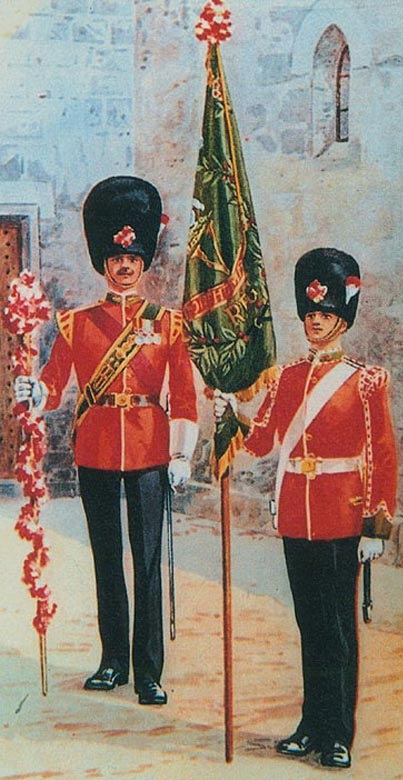
A sergeant drummer (drum major) and drummer of the Northumberland Fusiliers with the Drummer's Color.

==== Appearance and charges ====
The Drummer's Color is of gosling green silk edged with gold. St. George and the Dragon are embroidered in the center, with red scrolls edged with gold above and below. The motto of the Northumberland Fusiliers, Quo fata vocant (Go where divine providence leads), is displayed on the upper scroll, and 'Northumberland' on the lower. Above the lower scroll is a large 'V' with 'Regt' below, both in gold, indicating that the Northumberland Fusiliers were the 5th Regiment of Foot at the time of the battle. A laurel wreath with red berries surrounds the central elements, and Tudor roses surmounted by crowns are featured in the four corners.

=== British civilian and cadet Corps of Drums ===
In addition to Army and Navy/Royal Marines Corps of Drums, there are also cadet-civilian corps in the United Kingdom who base their music on the military traditions of the country especially those perpetuated by the Army. The Army Cadet Force corps uses the Army-style formations and instrumentation (flutes, bugles, snare-, bass-, and tenor-drums, cymbals, and glockenspiels), save for those with Scottish and Irish links, which have pipe bands instead, and those affiliated with the Light Infantry, which have a Corps of Drums with only bugles and no fifes. The corps of the Combined Cadet Force, Royal Marines Volunteer Cadet Corps, and the Sea Cadet Corps use the RN/RM naval- and ship-style corps (snare drums, bugles, bass-, and tenor-drums, cymbals, and glockenspiels) and may be either attached to the main band or separate formations. This formation is also used by the military band of the Duke of York's Royal Military School. Another example of a military-style Corps of Drums is that of the Royal British Legion, whose bands are modeled on the Royal Navy and Royal Marines Band Service. While the Royal Air Force does not have a Corps of Drums, the Royal Air Force Air Cadets are active, utilizing a formation similar to those of the RN and RM.

In 2011, the Metropolitan Police restarted a Corps of Drums when the central youth engagement unit purchased drums and sent cadets to a "band camp". It is the first band in the Metropolitan Police to be composed of members of the Metropolitan Police since 1988. It is also the first band in the name of the Metropolitan Police since 1997, when the civilian Metropolitan Police Band was disbanded.

Civilian Corps of Drums are also formatted after the various military services, with corps often patterned after those of the Army, Navy, and Marines in instrumentation and marching style. These corps are staffed by both veteran and retired military drummers as well as civilian drummers. In Northern Ireland, civilian corps often utilize flutes, instead of bugles, and several formations even use accordions instead of flutes.

== United States ==
A fife and drum corps in the United States is a type of military band that originated in European armies in the 16th century. These corps feature drums, flutes or fifes, and bugles. These corps are led by a drum major who delivers commands using a mace or spontoon.

The United States Army Old Guard Fife and Drum Corps, raised in 1960 and part of the 3rd US Infantry Regiment (The Old Guard) of the United States Army, formally revived the Drum Corps style of music. This is the only musical unit of the U.S. Armed Forces in which its drum major salutes using the left hand. Musicians assigned to this unit wear 18th-century military uniforms such as those worn in the American Revolutionary War. In addition, the drum major wears an 18th-century infantry cap and carries a spontoon, the honor badge and weapon of 18th-century senior non-commissioned officers.

A Corps of Drums called the West Point Hellcats operates as part of the West Point Band. This corps wears regulation uniforms from the 1820s, and as of 2016 plays using bugles, fifes, and traditional rope tension snare and bass drums.

Valley Forge Military Academy and College (VFMAC) has a Corps of Drums that is part of the regimental band. Uniforms and music are modeled after the Royal Marines' Corps of Drums. Additionally, VFMAC has a similar but separate formation that is part of the Corps of Cadets and is known as VFMAC Field Music, which only uses drums, cymbals, bugles, and, as of 2011, fifes. Formed in 1956, it also provides the official guard of honor for visitors to the Delaware Valley area.

== Germany ==
In Germany, Spielmannszug, Tambourkorps, and sometimes Trommlerkorps are the names given to both military and civilian Corps of Drums in Germany. These corps commonly feature fifes, snare drums, flutes, piccolos, glockenspiels, bass drums, cymbals, and, in some corps, single and multiple tenor drums, and occasionally bugles. Timpani, vibraphones, marimbas, and drum kits are used in concerts. A Turkish crescent may be used to symbolize these corps, as well as a banner or guidon bearing the ensemble emblem. A drum major always leads the corps during military and civil parades and other events, and in modern corps even majorettes and pom-pom dancers may be a part of its roster.

Military Corps of Drums are attached to the bands of the Bundeswehr Military Music Center under the Bundeswehr Streitkräftebasis (Joint Support Service), while civilian corps are dedicated civil bands and youth bands assigned in cities and towns across Germany.

From 1955 to 1990, East Germany's National People's Army maintained a Corps of Drums in the same manner as the Bundeswehr. During the Republic Day parades on October 7 in East Berlin from 1959 to 1989, the national corps included single tenor drums at the front rank with mallets played instead of drum sticks.

== Russia/CIS/Nations with Russian influence ==
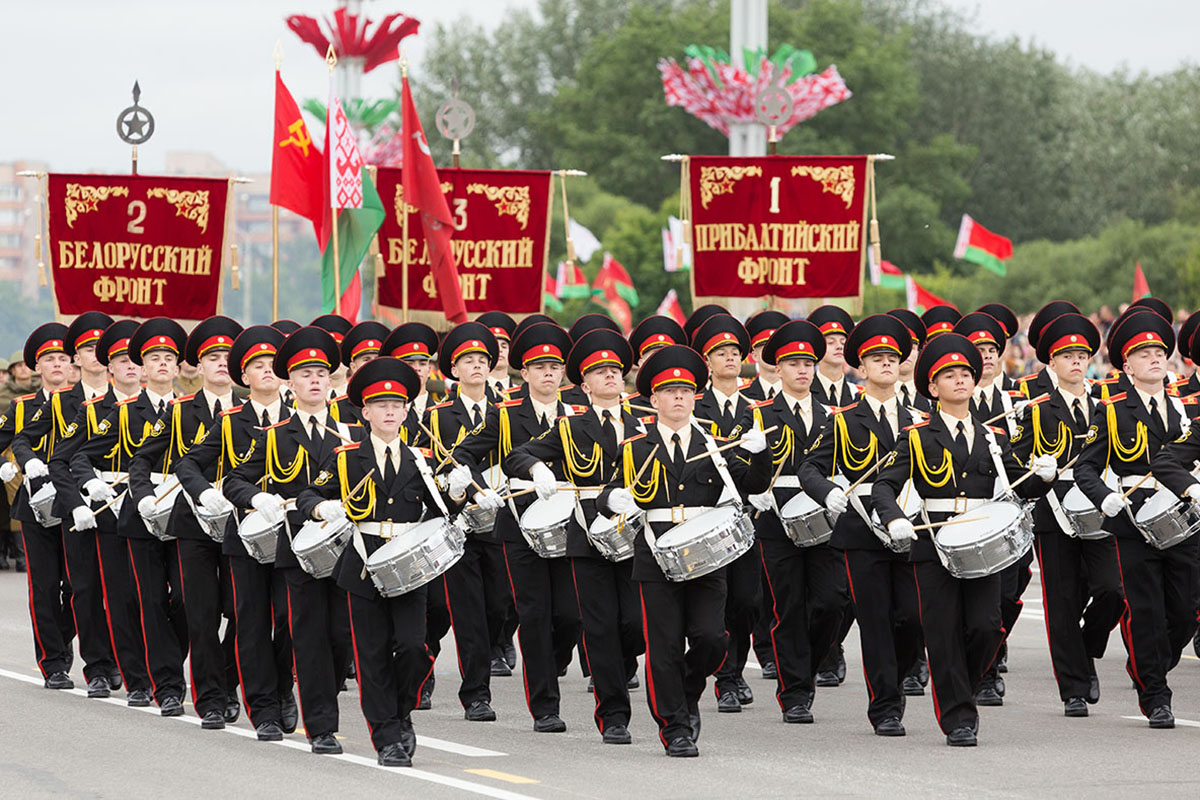
Drummers of the Minsk Suvorov Military School on the avenue during a parade in 2017.

Russian Barabanshchiki are Russian military Corps of Drums (рота барабанщиков, rota barabanshchikov). The practice is of Imperial origin and is a part of the traditions of almost all former Soviet republics (save for the Baltics and Georgia). Russian drum corps are usually made up of snare drummers with one line of flute or fife players in the middle and two glockenspiels in the front, occasionally featuring a third glockenspiel, a Turkish crescent, chromatic fanfare trumpeters, buglers, trumpeters, or trombonists. Military Corps of Drums are usually separate from the massed military bands of the unit or command that it is a part of, and are led by a drum major who is a junior officer. Until 1970, all Corps of Drums served to reinforce the massed bands in major parades, a tradition introduced in Moscow in the 1930s and influenced by the former Imperial Russian and German practice.

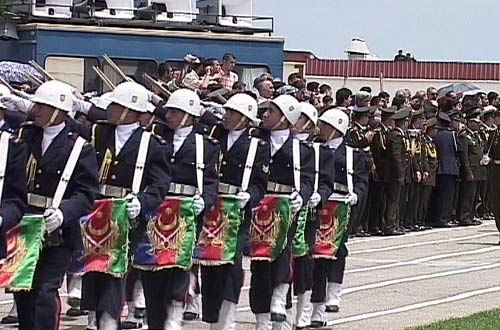
An Azerbaijani corps of drums.

Historically, Russian Corps of Drums are military units that are formally a part of the junior military high schools. Uniquely, the Azerbaijani Armed Forces follows the Turkish model by attaching a full bugle formation behind the corps of drums.

=== List of Post-Soviet units/institutions with Corps of Drums ===
- Moscow Military Music College
- All Suvorov Military Schools (i.e. Minsk, Yekaterinburg, Kazan)
- All Nakhimov Naval Schools (the Murmansk branch for example)
- Kronstadt Sea Cadet Corps
- Black Sea Fleet Naval Training Center Sevastopol
- Ivan Bohun Military High School
- Monte Melkonian Military College
- Jamshid Nakhchivanski Military Lyceum
- Astana Zhas Ulan Republican School
- Mastibek Tashmukhamedov Military Lyceum of the Ministry of Defense of Tajikistan
- Berdimuhamed Annayev 1st Specialized Military School
- Military Music College of Mongolia
- Georgi Atanasov Military Music School (until 2001)

== Sweden ==
Only the Life Guards King's Guard Battalion has a Corps of Drums organized as a platoon. The Svea Corps of Drums (Fältpiparkåren/Livgardets trumkår) is part of the battalion's Life Company, which serves as guards of honor. Until 2009 the Royal Swedish Army Drum Corps served as the official active field music unit of both the Army and the entire Armed Forces, and thus only the Home Guard Command maintained the practice with dedicated ensembles in several areas of the country.

Both the Svea Corps and the Army Drum Corps utilize the same instrumentation as a British corps, with a brass section added.

== Spain ==
Only four Armed Forces formations in Spain carry a full Corps of Drums (Banda de guerra de tambores y pifanos) led by drum majors, who play the fife or keyed flute alongside the drumline. The tradition arrived in Spain during the long existence of the Tercio system.

The Spanish Royal Guard and the Infantry Regiment "Inmemorial del Rey" No. 1 both continue the traditions of the corps. Additionally, the two regiments of the Regulares have a form of a Corps of Drums known as Nuba, which dates to 1911 and thus combines the instrumentation with chirimias, bugles, trumpets, and cornets.

== Canada ==
Only one Corps of Drums is active within the Canadian Army, and that is the Corps of Drums of Princess Patricia's Canadian Light Infantry (PPCLI). Each of the three regular battalions of the PPCLI maintains a Corps of Drums, while the Loyal Edmonton Regiment of the Army Reserve (affiliated as 4 PPCLI) also maintains a Corps of Drums. The Drum Major in each battalion is an Infantry Senior NCO, while the drummers may be drawn from any occupational specialty serving in the battalion. While the drum is the normal instrument of each Corps, some drummers may carry bugles as well. The Corps of Drums is normally not a permanently formed element, but assembles aa required for practices and ceremonial parades. The ceremonial dress and accoutrements of the Corps are similar to the PPCLI regimental ceremonial scarlet uniform, which is in turn based on British Army light infantry ceremonial dress of the early 20th century. The stick drill used by the drummers is based on Royal Marines stick drill, and is a highly popular aspect of any Corps of Drums performance.

Purely civilian historical re-enactor Corps of Drums can be found in the Fort Henry Guard, Fort George Fife and Drum Corps, and the Fort York Guard, all of which include fifes and are led by a Drum Major and a Drum Sergeant.

In the Royal Canadian Navy, Corps of Drums have been historically attached to military bands at the front rank following the precedent set by the bands of the Royal Navy and the Corps of Royal Marines. After the 1968 Unification of the Canadian Armed Forces, Corps of Drums were dismantled and abolished, though notably made a return in the mid-1980s within the naval reserve. In July 2013, a five-person Corps of Drums was unveiled for the first time by the Naden Band of Maritime Forces Pacific at a Victoria Day Parade.

== Netherlands and in Indonesia ==
Drum bands are the Dutch and Indonesian terms for the Corps of Drums. In the Netherlands, they are also known as drumfanfares, tamboerkorps, trompetterkorps and klaroenkorps (drum and lyre bands, fanfare bands, and drum and brass bands), and in Indonesia as marching bands and drum corps.

=== Netherlands ===
Military drum bands in the armed forces of the Netherlands opt for a more basic setup, utilizing only two to four of these instruments. Some bands feature optional instruments. These bands are attached to the main marching band but also perform as stand-alone bands. They are led by a drum major, though the former Drum and Bugle Corps of the Rifle Guards Regiment was led by a bugle major. These bands may also feature majorettes and colour guards (though the latter now tends to be separated from the band).

In the 1980s, these bands became paramilitary-styled. Many adopted the traditions of British military bands, but several of these bands took on the American marching band and Drum and Bugle Corps practice. Some of these bands also adopted woodwind instruments, turning them into full-time military marching bands. Almost all drum bands in the Netherlands use English voice commands instead of Dutch commands, and only a few use whistle commands and mace movements.

=== Indonesia ===
In Indonesia, the Corps, a military musical heritage from Dutch colonial times, and a variant of the tanjidor marching band, may be treated as a military, civil, or school marching and show band, and in some cases as a Drum and Bugle Corps. A Corps is either attached to the main marching band or operates as a stand-alone band. At the same time, the instruments of the "civil front ensemble" may be different from it, but they all contain a variety of different instruments. If saxophones are included, the corps turns into a full marching band, a tradition in the Home Affairs Governance Colleges.

They are led by one to six drum majors and may have a separate director of music (in civil and police bands only), majorettes, and colour guards. The drum majors in these bands make unique use of the mace in order to coordinate the timing and precision of the band. The Indonesian corps may also have dancing bass drummers, dancing contrabass buglers, and baritone buglers who wear either uniforms or costumes, a unique feature that ties these corps to Indonesian cultural traditions. The instruments are pitched in C, F, or B major.

Another unique characteristic is that, in military and police Corps of Drums, tenor and bass drummers, baritone buglers (optionally), and contrabass buglers wear combat, duty, or everyday uniforms (and optionally costumes) instead of full dress uniforms while playing. These uniforms include berets, ball caps, or side caps as head-dress, unlike the rest of the band, who wear peaked caps. Bands of the Armed Forces academies tend to have their single tenor drummers wear the specialty uniform and colored berets of the selected service arm or branch, with those of the Navy wearing free diving gear, and the Air Force wearing flight suits.

=== Ancient style corps of drums in Indonesia ===
The practice of drum corps was introduced to the Netherlands East Indies in the early 1800s, and today both the Yogyakarta Kraton Guards and the Royal Guard of Pakualaman each sport an ancient form of the corps, alongside a recently reconstituted formation from the Royal Guard of the Surakarta Sunanate. Alongside them, both the southern regencies of Central Java and Yogyakarta have dedicated civilian corps, each serving the bregodo rakyat (people's brigade) companies that preserve the traditions of the armed services of the former sultanates. These corps, when formed up in parade, are composed of:

- Snare drums
- Fifes
- Flutes suling flutes
- Bugles
- Trumpets (in some civil bands)
- One to three Kendangs
- Single tenor drums (in civil bands)
- Cymbals
- Bass drum (in civil bands and in Surakarta)
- Gongs

== South America ==
Inspired by the German (and sometimes French) style corps of drums, South American corps differ in instrumentation, size and leadership.

=== Chile ===
Similar to the German corps, the Chilean Corps of Drums are formally known as the Bandas de Guerra (War Bands). These are both military and civil bands.

Military Corps of Drums belong to the Chilean Armed Forces' services, the Carabineros de Chile and the Chilean Gendarmerie. They differ in instrumentation and officers in charge.

- Chilean Army: Snare drums, fifes, and bugles (led by a drum major and a bugle major)
- Chilean Navy: Snare drums, fifes, and bugles (led by a drum major)
- Chilean Air Force: Snare drums and bugles (led by a drum major and a bugle major)
- Chilean Carabiners: Snare drums and bugles (led by a drum major and a bugle major)
- Chilean Gendarmerie: Snare drums and bugles (led by a drum major and a bugle major)

The military-style corps also inherit the British corps' tradition of carrying drummers' swords, attached to belts on all their dress uniforms.

Civilian corps are usually school-based bands and are either part of a school marching band or a standalone band, and may include a percussion section and glockenspiels. In these separate bands, a fife major leads the band's fifers while on duty, and also assists the drum major and the bugle major. These positions also exist in corps which are now part of school bands, as well as in some volunteer community fire departments. These civil corps perform on occasions when requested and participate in competitions.

=== Ecuador ===
Corps of Drums in Ecuador are both military and civil bands. These corps are very similar to the German corps but additionally include bugles and tenor drums.

Like the Chilean corps, Ecuadorian armed forces bands have differences in configuration and instrumentation. The corps snare and tenor and sometimes bass drummers often play on drums that are painted in the service or unit colors (sometimes in the colors of Guayaquil, which are blue and white for the corps of the Ecuadorian Navy), and in the case of the Military Academy Eloy Alfaro and the Air Force Academy Cosme Rendella, have the unit or school insignia attached to the bugles' and fifes' tabards.

The typical Ecuadorian corps are known as the Peloton Comando (Commando Platoon) or Banda de Guerra (War Band). In several schools and colleges (many bands now fall under the Banda Escolar or Banda de Paz title due to recent state reforms), the corps is led by a drum major (in several cases there would be 1 to 4 drum majors) and is composed of:

- Snare drums
- Fifes (common only in the Ecuadorian Army and Ecuadorian Air Force and school bands)
- Bugles
- Natural trumpets (common in all three services; principal instrument in the Ecuadorian Navy)
- Tenor drums
- Bass drums (optional and common in some corps)
- Cymbals (optional in some corps)
- Glockenspiels

Ecuadorian Civil Corps of Drums are similar to the Army and Air Force corps but are typically started as youth bands stationed in schools across the nation. Notable exceptions include the Corps of Drums of the Ecuadorian National Police. Like military corps, they are led by a drum major in all their activities, but there are cases of multiple drum majors leading, from a minimum of two to a maximum of five. Some corps also feature majorettes and tambourine players. Those that are based on the Navy's Corps of Drums (especially Guayaquil-based corps) use the same instrumentation as the Navy.

=== Venezuela ===
Similar to Germany, the Venezuelan Corps of Drums are both military and civil bands, and contain the following instrumentation:

- Snare drums
- Bass drums
- Cymbals
- Single tenor drums
- Glockenspiels
- Bugles
- Trumpets (optional)

The Venezuelan corps of drums has about 35 members.

The corps is led by a single drum major. In some corps, especially in civil-based ones, other brass instruments may be added to the bugle section.

Military corps have tabards applied on the bass drums, snare drums, glockenspiels, and bugles at every performance. One such formation is the Military Academy of Venezuela Corps of Drums. In recent years, there has been an effort to establish full-time military marching bands in the national armed forces, with the percussion of the corps combined with brass and woodwind instruments.

=== Bolivia ===
Corps of Drums in Bolivia, both military and civil, are inspired by German and French band practices and are part of the main band. The instruments used by these corps include snare drums, tenor drums (single and multiple), bass drums, cymbals, and sometimes glockenspiels. In military corps attached to bands, there are one to two drum majors. Civil corps attached to marching bands have up to ten drum majors. Several school civil corps in cities in Bolivia preserve the tradition of a bugle section and fifes.

=== Peru ===
Peruvian Corps of Drums are both military (Banda de guerra) and civil bands (Banda ritmica), each having differences in instrumentation. These corps are a critical part of the school or military marching band. They are led by a Director of Music, with the drum major, majorette, or standard bearer roles led by the conductor. These follow the Spanish and French influences.

Corps of Drums in the Peruvian Armed Forces and the National Police of Peru and school or college-based bands and their associated corps are composed of field drums, single tenor drums, bugles, and glockenspiels, in addition to the regular snare and bass drums and cymbals. Tambourines are common within the school-based corps, with female majorettes assisting the conductor, school band drum major, or music director. Tabards are attached to the bugles and glockenspiels as well as to the snare and tenor drums if applicable.

=== Colombia ===
Colombian Corps of Drums are similar to those of other South American countries but are different in leadership, being led by 3-7 drum majors or majorettes. Civil corps would also have a separate conductor, and occasionally standard bearers and colour guards marching along.

Drums are either covered with cloth tabards of the unit or band to which the corps belongs or painted in various colors. The bugles, trumpets, and glockenspiels (and in military units and several civil bands, natural trumpets) are decorated with small tabards with the military service, police, school, or college insignia, name, or emblem.

== Central America ==
Known as Bandas de Guerra or banda tradicional, Corps of Drums tradition are also active in the following Central American countries:

- Guatemala
- El Salvador
- Honduras
- Panama

The Guatemalan, Honduran, and El Salvadoran corps traditions are mostly active in school-based corps, which mirror the Drum and Bugle Corps of the U.S. and Mexico. In Panama, both the public forces and educational institutions maintain a corps section in bands, while some are standalone formations. In Nicaragua, only the Nicaraguan Armed Forces sports a small corps that is manned by officer cadets modeled on the Mexican corps tradition. School-based bands are known as bandas ritmicas, follow the Peruvian pattern, and are percussion only.

== See also ==
- Military band
- Marching band
- Police band (music)
- Pipe band
- Fanfare trumpet
- Fanfare band
