= Alexander Berzin =

Alexander Berzin may refer to:

- Aleksandr Berzin (born 1946), Soviet and Russian sailor, Hero of the Russian Federation
- Alexander Berzin (scholar) (born 1944), Buddhist scholar and author
