= Nakhimov Naval School (Saint Petersburg) =

Naval school

- Нахимовское военно-морское училище
- Emblem of the school
- Type: boarding school
- Established: 1944; 82 years ago
- Founders: Ministry of Defense of Russia
- Affiliation: Russian Navy
- Officer in charge: Vice Admiral of the Reserve Aleksey Maksimchuk
- Students: 240
- Address: Petrogradskaya Embankment, Saint Petersburg, Russia; 59.9556°N 30.3362°E
- Language: Russian

The Nakhimov Naval School (Russian: Нахимовское военно-морское училище) in Saint Petersburg is a military boarding school of the Russian Navy.

== Overview ==
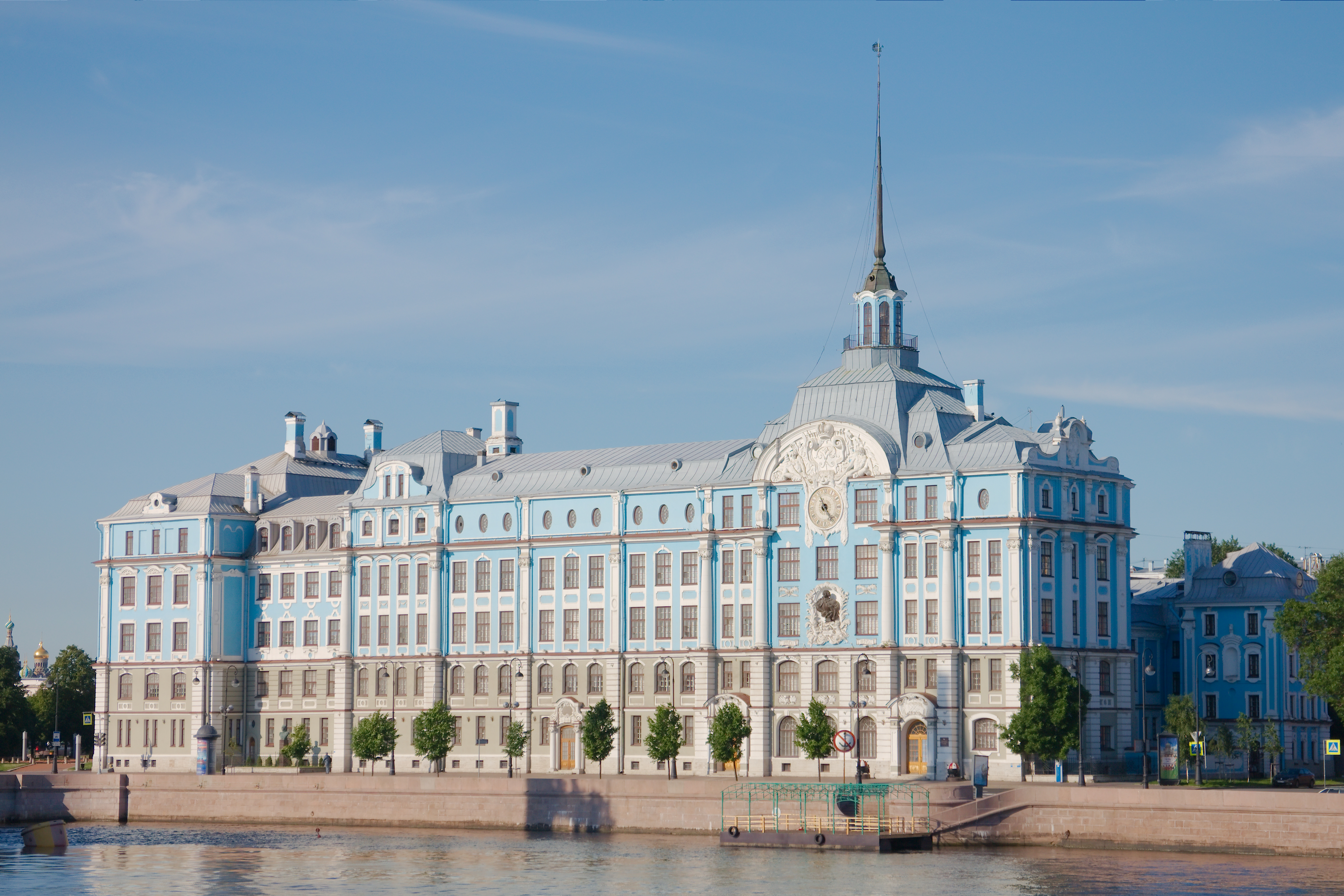
The school building.

The Leningrad Nakhimov Naval School was created in accordance with the decree of the Council of People's Commissars on 21 June 1944 and the People's Commissariat for Military and Naval Affairs. The date of publication of the order (23 June), is set as the annual holiday of the school. It was the first Nakhimov Naval School to be formed, with the school being named after admiral of the Imperial Russian Navy Pavel Nakhimov. On 18 September 1944, the first admission to the school took place. In the first academic year, 408 pupils studied at the school. In 1948, the first graduation of cadets took place. In 2016, the Vladivostok Presidential Cadet School and the Sevastopol Presidential Cadet School became branches of the school. By order of President Vladimir Putin on 1 September 2017, the Murmansk Nakhimov Naval School became the third branch of the school. On 25 May 2017, it was awarded the public Order "To the Glory of the Russian Fleet" 1st Degree.

Currently, the term of study at the school is 7 years. It is among the first pre-university educational institutions of the Ministry of Defense of Russia to start the academic year.

The school has been representing the Soviet Navy at military parades on Moscow's Red Square and Saint Petersburg's Palace Square on many occasions (Victory Day (9 May), October Revolution Day (7 November), and International Workers' Day (1 May)). In 1996, the parade regiment of the school received a personal certificate of the Supreme Commander-in-Chief (then Boris Yeltsin) for its march in the 1996 Moscow Victory Day Parade. In 2013, by order Minister of Defense Sergey Shoygu, it returned to the Moscow Victory Day Parade. In 2020, thirty-one cadets of the school came down with a case of COVID-19 while preparing for the postponed victory parade that year.

== School Commandants ==
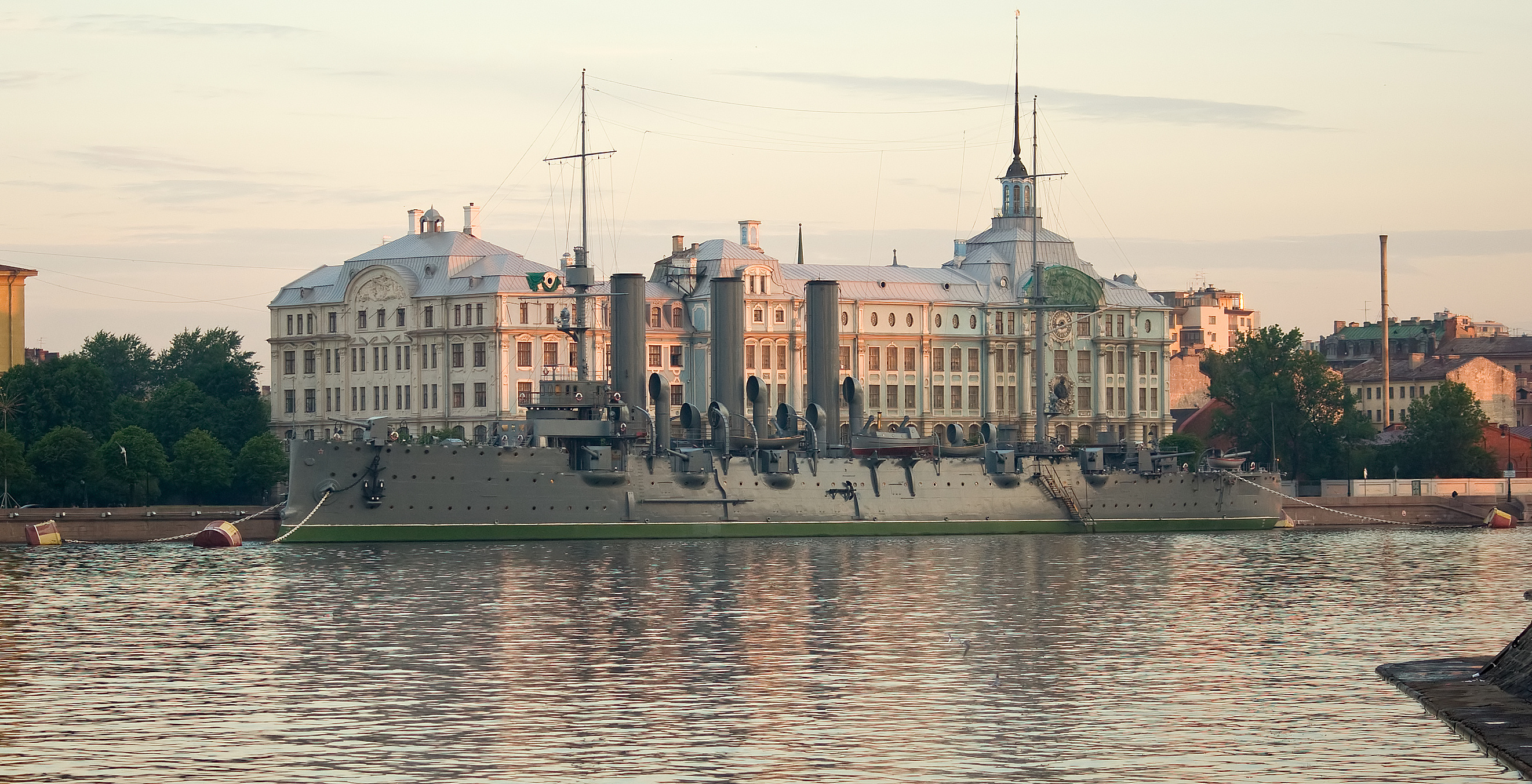
The Russian cruiser Aurora was the first campus of the school.

- Vice Admiral of the Reserve Aleksey Maksimchuk (2020—present)

== Notable graduates ==
- Sergei Zheleznyak, former member of the State Duma.
- Andrei Volozhinsky, former First Deputy Commander-in-Chief of the Russian Navy.
- Timur Apakidze, Russian-Georgian fighter pilot who was the founder of the modern Russian Naval Aviation.
- Vladimir Vysotskiy (admiral), former Commander of the Russian Northern Fleet.
- Nikolai Maksimov, former head of the Navy Shipbuilding and Weapons Research Institute
- Sergei Pinchuk, former commander of the Caspian Flotilla.
- Aleksandr Berzin, a Hero of the Russian Federation
- Valery Varfolomeyev, Commander of the 11th Submarine Division of the Northern Fleet.
- Igor Schvede, Representative of the Estonian Defence Forces to NATO.

== See also ==
- Kronstadt Sea Cadet Corps
- Suvorov Military School
- Naval Cadet Corps (Russia)

== Links ==
- Official Website of the school
