= Vladivostok Presidential Cadet School =

School in Vladivostok, Russia

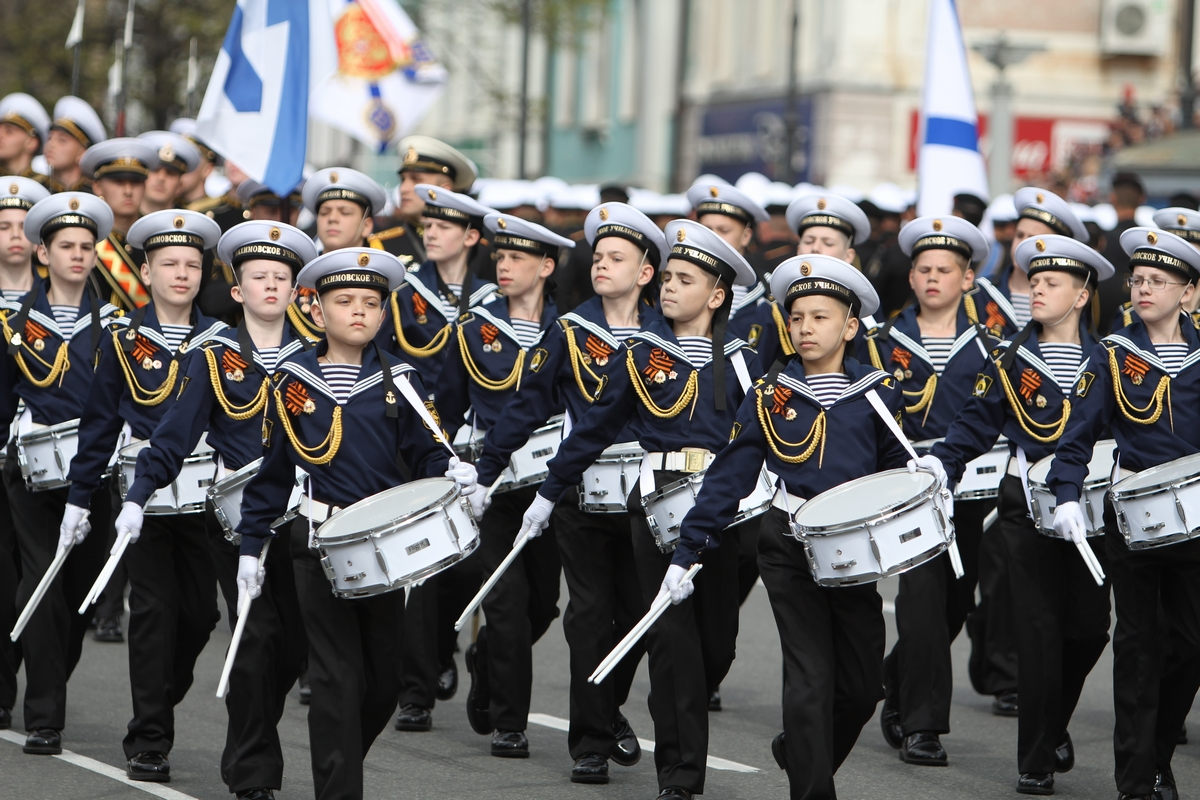
Cadets of the school during the Vladivostok Victory Day Parade in 2019.

The Vladivostok Presidential Cadet School (Russian: Владивостокское президентское кадетское училище; ВПКУ) is a Russian Navy Nakhimov Naval School located in the Far Eastern city of Vladivostok, acting a branch of the boarding school in Saint-Petersburg.

== History ==
On 24 August 2013, Defense Minister Sergei Shoigu wrote a letter to President Vladimir Putin with a proposal to establish a presidential cadet school in the Far Eastern Federal District. The proposal was approved by President Putin, and on 29 October, the school was created. Rear Admiral Vladimir Burakov was appointed head of the school. The school year began on 1 September 2014 and on 25 October, the first solemn dedication of pupils took place. In 2016, it was reorganized as a branche of the Nakhimov Naval School in Saint Petersburg. On 31 August 2016, Putin visited the school to announce its new status. It graduated its first set of students in June 2019.

== Other information ==
The school is located on the grounds of the Pacific Higher Naval School. The standard term of study is seven years from the 5th to 11th grades. Every year, 80 students are recruited for study at the school. Students engage in specialized courses aimed at preparing them for a future in the Russian Armed Forces as well as the private sector. Cadets study the English language, an oriental language of their choice (Chinese or Japanese) as well as topics unique to the navy and naval life (ship modeling, marine robotics, the history of navigation).

== See also ==
- Kronstadt Sea Cadet Corps
- Suvorov Military School
- Naval Cadet Corps (Russia)
