= Riga Nakhimov Naval School =

Former Nakhimov Naval School in Latvia

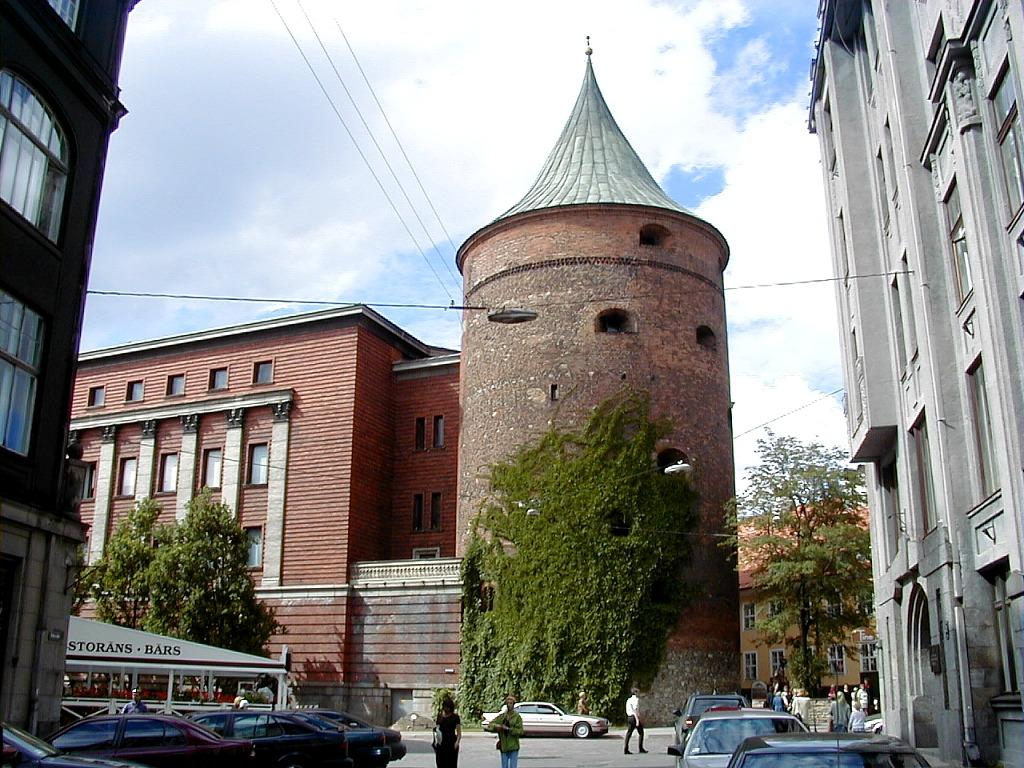
The Latvian War Museum, which was the former building of the Riga Nakhimov Naval School.

The Riga Nakhimov Naval School (Latvian: Rīgas Nahimova Skola; Russian: Рижское Нахимовское военно-морское училище, romanized: Rizhskoye Nakhimovskoye voyenno-morskoye uchilishche) is one of the former Nakhimov Naval Schools in the Soviet Union. It existed from 1945 to 1953 in Riga, the capital Latvian SSR, where it was located. Throughout its eight-year existence, it operated from the building that is now the Latvian War Museum.

== History ==
It was created on 21 July 1945, and became the third Nakhimov school in the USSR (after Tbilisi and Leningrad). It was officially inaugurated on 30 August 1945. The first bell rang there on 3 December. The Nakhimov School was a secondary naval training institution, with boys from 10 to 14 years old being accepted, mainly orphans and military children who died in the Great Patriotic War. After graduation, graduates were enrolled in higher naval institutions. In 1953 it disbanded and its pupils joined the Leningrad Naval Forces. The school only ever graduated from 398 people. Many of its graduates continued their studies at the Higher Naval Diving School, which was soon founded in Riga.

A notable alumni of the school is Afro-Russian actor and poet James Lloydovich Patterson.

== Heads of the school ==
- Captain Konstantin Bezpalchev (1945–1952)
- Captain Anatoly Tsvetkov (1952–1953)

== See also ==
- Suvorov Military School
