= Nakhimov Naval School =

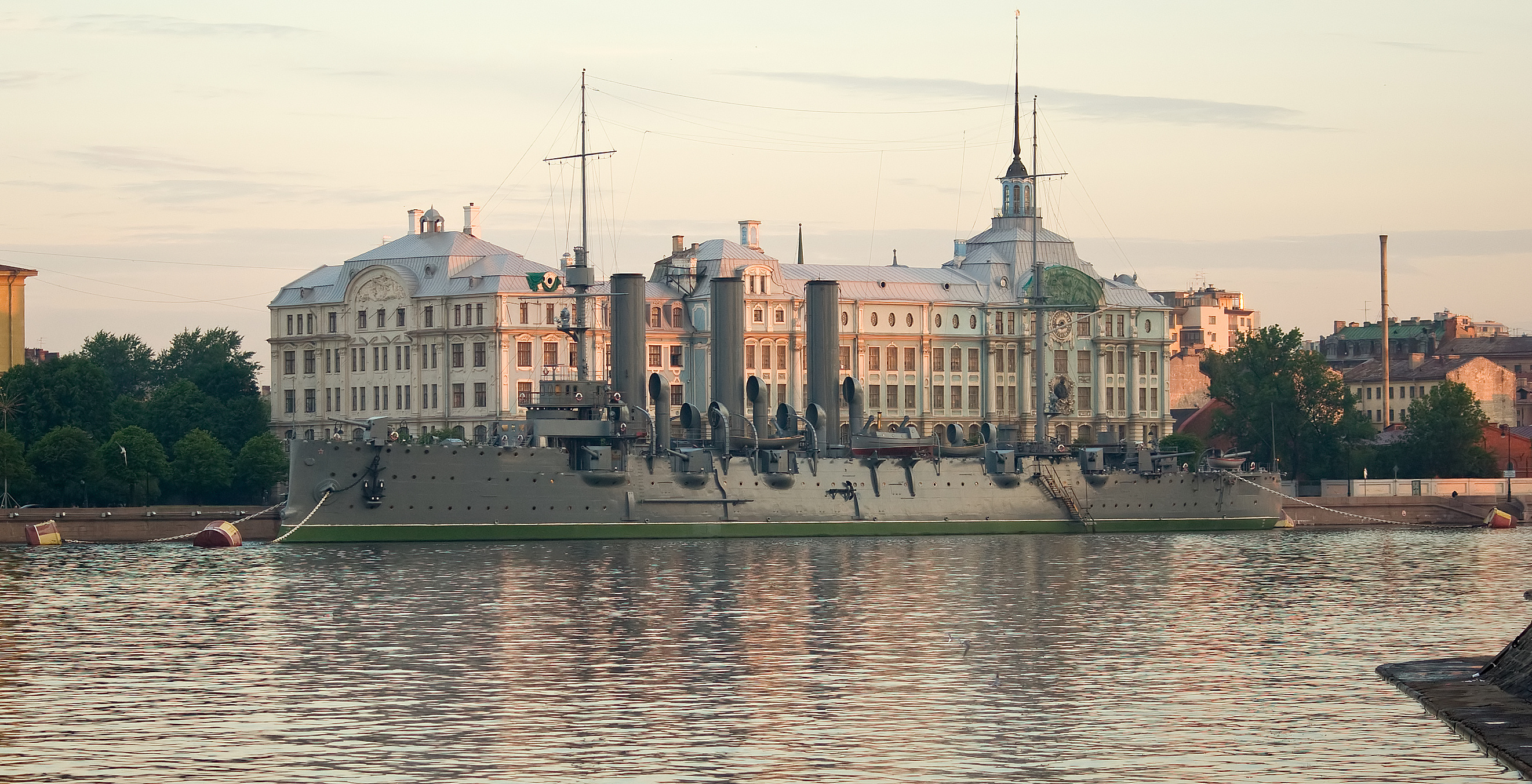
The Russian cruiser Aurora was the first campus and training ship of the Nahkimov Naval School.

The Nakhimov Naval School (Russian: Нахимовское военно-морское училище, romanized: Nakhimovskoye voyenno-morskoye uchilishche) or Nakhimov School (Russian: Нахимовское училище, romanized: Nakhimovskoye uchilishche) is a form of military education for teenagers introduced in the Soviet Union and once also located in other cities. They are named after well-known Russian admiral Pavel Nakhimov.

== History ==
The first Nakhimov School was introduced in Tbilisi in 1943 during the Second World War, for sons of military personnel who died in action. The Tbilisi Nakhimov Naval School existed between 1943 and 1955. In 1944 the Leningrad Nakhimov Naval School opened. The Riga Nakhimov Naval School (Latvian: Rigas Nachimova Skola) existed during 1945–1953.

Today in Russia, only the St. Petersburg Nakhimov School continues to exist. The school today offers teenage boys preparation for service as officers in the Russian Navy, secondary education, and military-style training in national naval traditions. As of 2017, the school has branches in Vladivostok, Murmansk and Sevastopol, with schools being located in all four fleets of Russia. Plans for a branch in Dagestan, connected with the Caspian Flotilla, were announced in 2018. On 13 August 2019 Defence Minister Sergey Shoygu laid the foundation stone for a new branch of the school in Kaliningrad, due to open in September 2020.

== School culture ==
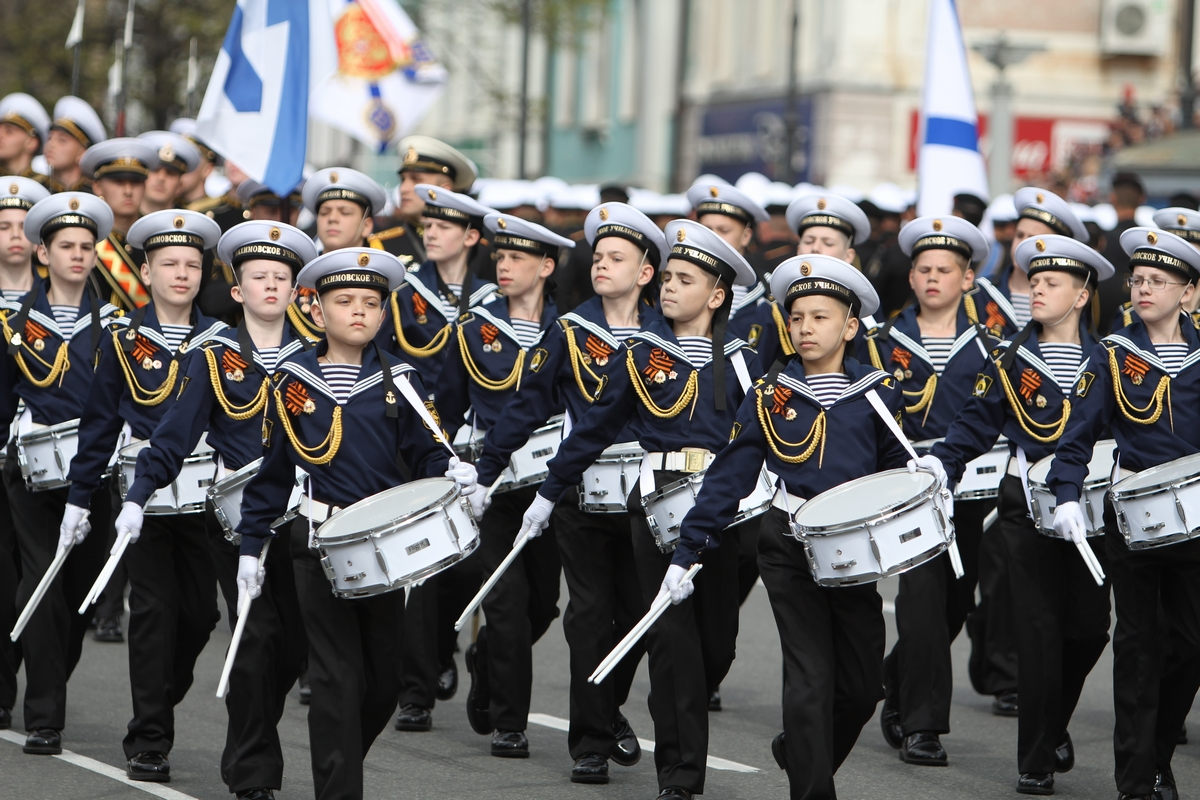
Cadets of the Vladivostok Presidential Cadet School during the Vladivostok Victory Day Parade in 2019.

Today, all Nakhimov schools have the traditional honor of opening all Victory Day Parades in their local city with their corps of drums (sans Saint Petersburg since the 1990s). It also participated in the now defunct October Revolution Day parades. In 2015 Major General Timur Apakidze, a Soviet naval aviation pioneer who had died in a flying accident in 2001, was added to the rolls of the Nakhimov Naval School in perpetuity. The general service march of the schools is the March of Nakhimovtsev (Марш Нахимовцев), written by Vasily Solovyov-Sedoi in 1949. Students at the Nakhimov Naval School and its graduates are known as "Nakhimovites".

== List of current schools ==
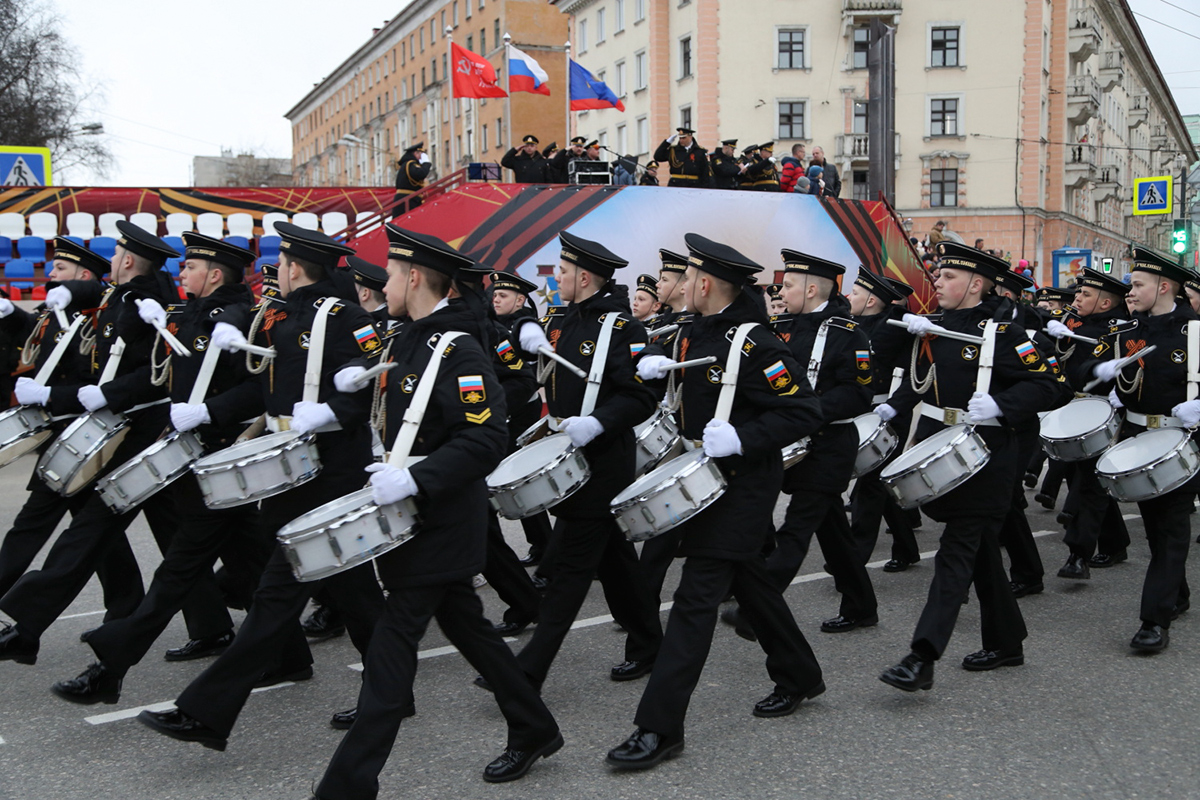
Cadets of the Murmansk Nakhimov Naval School in 2018.

Name	Location	Foundation date	Notes
Nakhimov Naval School	St. Petersburg	1944	
Murmansk Nakhimov Naval School	Murmansk	2017	On 31 August 2016, President Vladimir Putin instructed Defense Minister Sergey Shoigu to establish a Nakhimov Naval School in Murmansk. Construction of the building continued for a little over a year until it was completed on 1 September 2017. The complex was the first Nakhimov school built in Russia since the first school was opened in St. Petersburg in 1944.
Vladivostok Presidential Cadet School	Vladivostok	2013	
Sevastopol Presidential Cadet School	Sevastopol	2014	
Mariupol Nakhimov Naval School	Mariupol	2024 or 2025	A new Nakhimov Naval School was advocated to be built on the occupied territories de jure under Ukrainian control by specialists from the Russian Armed Forces. It is alleged to have a capacity of 600 students and be around 60,000 meters squared, although information is not widely available on its construction.

== Former schools ==
=== Riga Nakhimov Naval School ===
The Riga Nakhimov Naval School existed from 1945 to 1953 in the capital Latvian SSR, operating from the building that is now the Latvian War Museum throughout its 8 year existence. A notable alumni of the school included Afro-Russian actor and poet James Lloydovich Patterson.

=== Tbilisi Nakhimov Naval School ===
The Tbilisi Nakhimov Naval School was created by order of the People's Commissar of the Navy Nikolai Kuznetsov on 16 October 1943. It was the first Nakhimov school to be founded in the USSR. Being located in the Georgian Soviet Socialist Republic, it was one of two schools to be located outside of the RSFSR. It was disbanded in 1955. Among its notable alumni is Yuri Pivnev, the longtime head of the Leningrad DOSAAF.

== See also ==
- Suvorov Military School
- Cantonist
