= Latvian War Museum =

Museum in Riga, Latvia

- Latvijas Kara muzejs
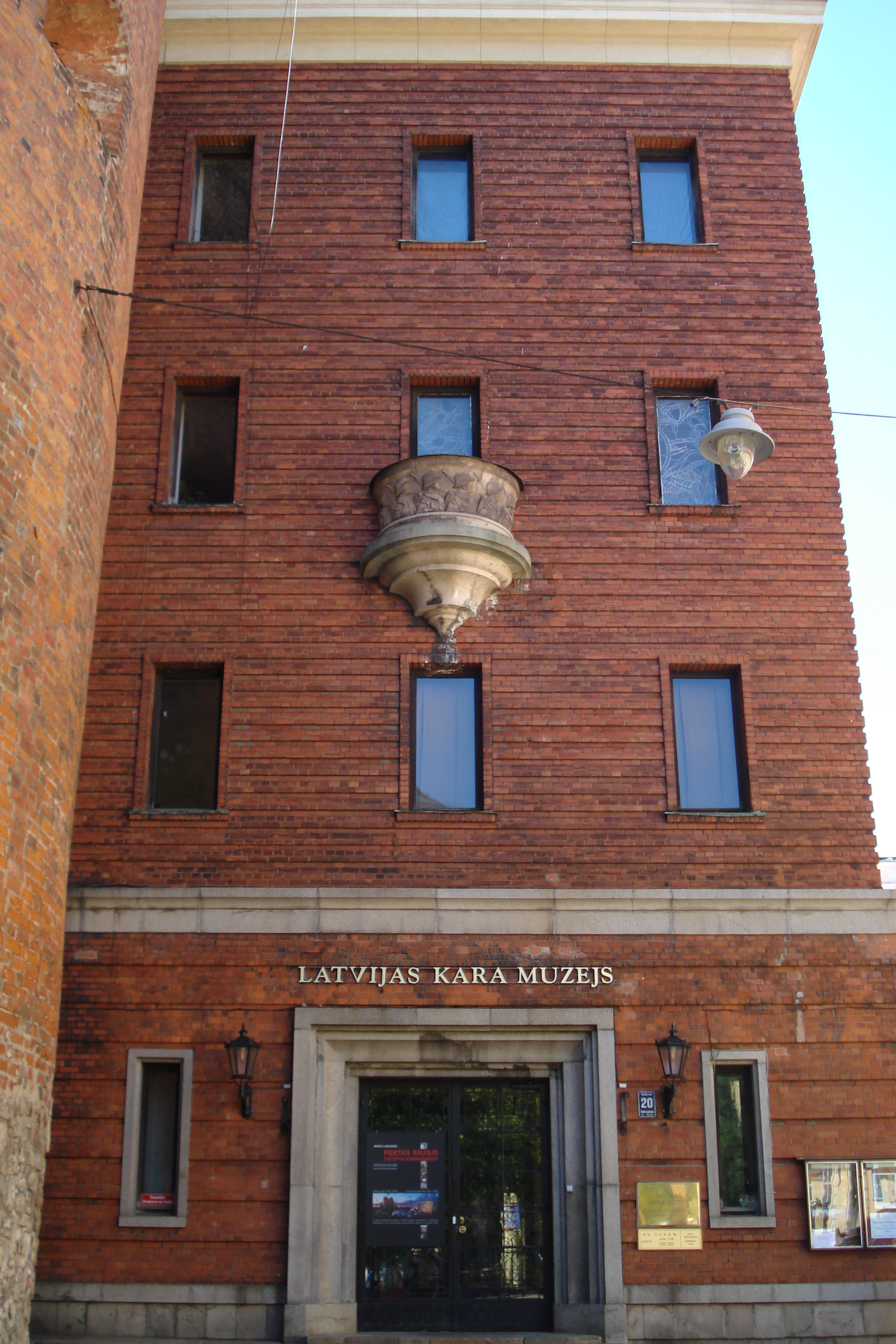
- Entrance of the Latvian War Museum
- Established: 15 October 1916
- Location: Smilšu street 20, Vecrīga, Riga, Latvia
- Coordinates: 56°57′04″N 24°06′33″E
- Type: Military history museum
- Collection size: More than 25 400 units
- Visitors: 141 700 (2014)
- Director: Aija Fleija
- Website: karamuzejs.lv

The Latvian War Museum (Latvian: Latvijas Kara muzejs) is a military museum in Riga, the capital of Latvia.

The Latvian War Museum was established on 15 October 1916 as the Latvian Riflemen Battalion Museum. Initially the museum had its premises at Tērbatas Street 1/3. The museum collected material relating to the Latvian Riflemen and World War I. In 1917, when Riga was bombarded, the museum was evacuated. In June 1919 the museum restored operations at the Powder Tower in old town Riga. The museum opened to the public in June 1921.

In 1936 the government acquired the neighbouring land lot. The erection of a new museum building was initiated in 1937, according to a project by architect Artūrs Galindoms. The interior works were additionally designed by architect R. Legzdiņš. All museum artifacts were temporarily stored at the museum workshop in Torņa Street. The new museum building was finished in the summer of 1940, but the museum did not manage to arrange *the exhibitions prior to the Soviet occupation of Latvia in 1940. The Latvian War Museum came under the jurisdiction of the Latvian People's Army's liquidation commission, which handed the museum artifacts over to the People's Commissariat of Education, and were stored at the previous Riga Stock Exchange building; and the museum premises were handed over to the Red Army. On 15 January 1941 the Latvian War Museum ceased to exist. Beginning in 1945, the building housed the Riga Nakhimov Naval School and continued to house it until 1953.

From 1957 to 1990 the premises were occupied by the Latvian SSR Revolution Museum, which interpreted 20th century Latvian history through the point of view of Soviet ideology. However, the museum had during its existence gathered valuable, representative Soviet artifacts for its collections.

On 11 June 1990 the Government of Latvia restored the Latvian War Museum.

== Exhibits ==
The museum contains a range of exhibits focusing on different wars that Latvia has been involved in. There is an exhibit on the history of Latvia and Riga before modern times and one focusing on the 18th-19th centuries. There are major exhibits on Latvia's involvement in the first and second world wars covering multiple battles in great detail. Latvia's recent military activities are also explored, including involvement in United Nations peacekeeping missions.
