= Aleksandr Berzin =

Russian naval officer

- Александр Александрович Берзин
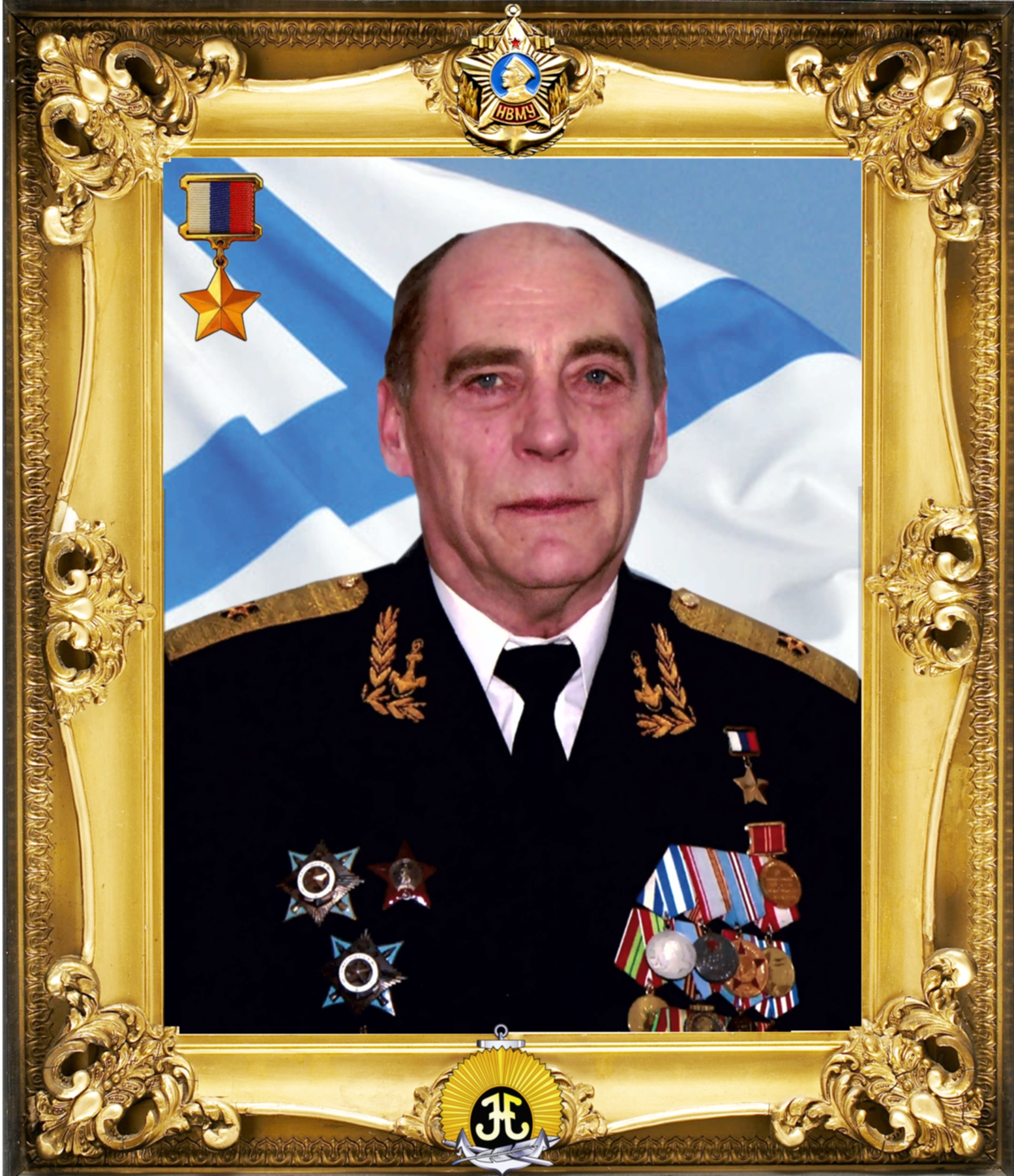
- Portrait, 2018
- Born: 18 March 1946 (age 80); Moscow, Russian SFSR, Soviet Union
- Military career
- Allegiance: USSR; Russia
- Branch: Soviet Navy; Russian Navy
- Service years: 1965-2001
- Rank: Rear Admiral
- Awards: Hero of the Russian Federation; Order of the Red Star; Order "For Service to the Homeland in the Armed Forces of the USSR" Second and Third Classes

Aleksandr Aleksandrovich Berzin (Russian: Александр Александрович Берзин; born 18 March 1946) is a retired officer of the Soviet and Russian navies. He reached the rank of rear admiral and received the title of Hero of the Russian Federation during his career.

== Biography ==
Berzin was born on 18 March 1946 in Moscow, in what was then the Russian Soviet Federative Socialist Republic, in the Soviet Union. Orphaned at an early age, he was raised by relatives in Baku in the Azerbaijan Soviet Socialist Republic, attending the Nakhimov Naval School in Leningrad and graduating with a silver medal in 1965. He went on to study at the Frunze Higher Naval School, graduating in 1970 and joining the Northern Fleet for service on submarines. He served aboard the K-418 between July 1970 and November 1975, and completed the Higher Special Officer Classes of the Navy in 1976. His next post was as senior assistant commander of the K-487 between July 1976, and January 1980, before he took over his first command, the K-216. This was followed by command of K-424, between September 1981 and September 1983.

Berzin studied at the Grechko Naval Academy between 1983 and 1985, becoming chief of staff and deputy division commander of a submarine flotilla after his graduation, and in November 1987, taking command of the 31st Submarine Division. He was promoted to rear admiral on 5 June 1989, and in July 1990 became first deputy commander of the 3rd Submarine Flotilla. He undertook a number of Arctic voyages during his career aboard submarines, and between 15 July and 12 August 1994 led an expedition of nuclear submarines to the North Pole as part of the 300th anniversary of the Russian Navy. On 4 January 1995 he was awarded the title of Hero of the Russian Federation.

In November 1994, Berzin took up the position of head of the department of operational art at the Kuznetsov Naval Academy, and in 1995 graduated from the Military Academy of the General Staff of the Armed Forces of Russia. He has written various academic works, becoming a Candidate of Military Sciences in 1997, and an associate professor in 1999. Berzin retired from active service in November 2001 and settled in Saint Petersburg, working at the Central Research Institute of Shipbuilding Technology, and serving as president of the Saint Petersburg Club of Submariners and Naval Veterans. Over his career he has received various awards and honours, including the Order of the Red Star in 1989, the Order "For Service to the Homeland in the Armed Forces of the USSR" third class in 1982, and second class in 1991.

== See also ==
- List of Heroes of the Russian Federation
