= Kazan Suvorov Military School =

Russian military academy

- Казанское суворовское военное училище
- Emblem of the school
- Other names: KxSVU
- Motto: "Жизнь Отечеству честь никому!"
- Motto in English: "Life to the Fatherland is an honor to anyone!"
- Type: military academy
- Established: 1944
- Founders: Soviet Government
- Affiliations: Armed Forces of Russia
- Academic affiliations: Suvorov Military Schools
- Officer in charge: Major-General Valery Mironchenko
- Location: 14 Tolstogo Street, Kazan, Tatarstan, Russia
- Language: Russian
- Website: http://kzsvu.mil.ru/

The Kazan Suvorov Military School (KzSVU) (Russian: Казанское суворовское военное училище; Tatar: Казан Суворов хәрби училищесы, romanized: Qazan Suvorov xärbi uçilişçesı) is a Russian military academy based in Tatarstan. It serves as one of the country's many Suvorov Military Schools funded by the Russian Armed Forces. It is currently decorated with the Order of the Red Banner.

== Background ==
After the creation of the first nine Suvorov schools in the early 1940s, the State Defense Committee adopted a resolution of June 4, 1944 to organize an additional six schools, including Kazan. On June 20, 1944, the Commander of the Volga Military District issued a directive on the formation of the Kazan Suvorov Military School. The temporary formation point was in the Admiralty suburb of Kazan, on the territory of the Zhytomyr Military Infantry School. The academic building was completed on September 30, 1944, which would later hold four companies of 100 people each. The first bell rang on October 2, 1944, with the first set of boys representing 14 nationalities from 19 regions and 8 autonomous republics of the center of the country. In 1949, 5 years later, the school's first graduation parade was held, when its first graduating classes were presented diplomas for completing secondary education. In 1973, the school was awarded by the Military Council of the Volga Military District for its success in the military-patriotic education of its students with the prestigious Order of the Red Banner, in celebration of the 30th anniversary of the Suvorov Schools. The school has also repeatedly won the Honor Prize of the Ministry of Defence of the Russian Federation, and has received a certificate of merit by the Commander-in-Chief of the Russian Ground Forces.

== List of heads ==
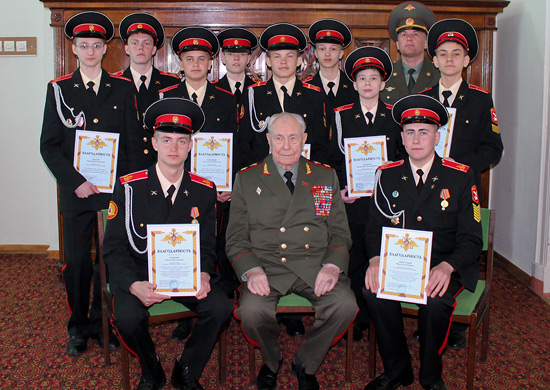
Marshal Dmitry Yazov with cadets of the school in 2014.

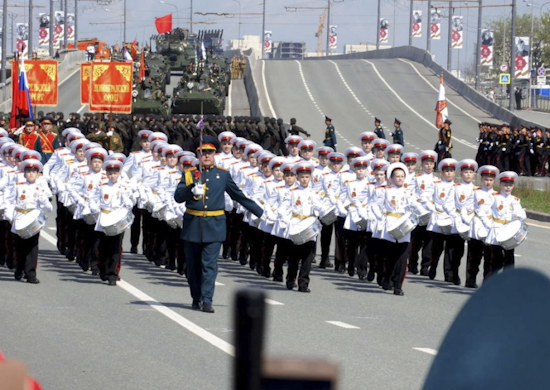
The cadet corps of drums.

- Major-General Vasiliy Boloznev (1944–1946)
- Major-General Grigory Miroshnichenko (1946–1951)
- Major-General Nikolai Rudnev (1951–1954)
- Major-General Ilya Panin (1954–1957)
- Major-General Alexander Smirnov (1958–1974)
- Major-General Nikolai Gorbanev (1974–1984)
- Major-General Claudius Shestakov (1984–1989)
- Major-General Mikhail Kotovsky (1989–2003)
- Colonel Valery Nemirovsky (2003–2006)
- Major-General Alexander Borodin (2006–2013)
- Lieutenant-General Vladimir Chainikov (2013–2014)
- Major-General Valery Mironchenko (2014–Present)

== Notable alumni ==
- Valery Gerasimov – Chief of the Russian General Staff
- Vladimir Chirkin – former head of the Russian Ground Forces
- Aleksandr Postnikov – Russian general
- Vadim Yemelyanov – Soviet amateur heavyweight boxer

== See also ==
- Armed Forces of Russia
- Kazan
- Suvorov Military School
