= Murmansk Nakhimov Naval School =

Naval school in Murmansk, Russia

- Мурманское Нахимовское военно-морское училище
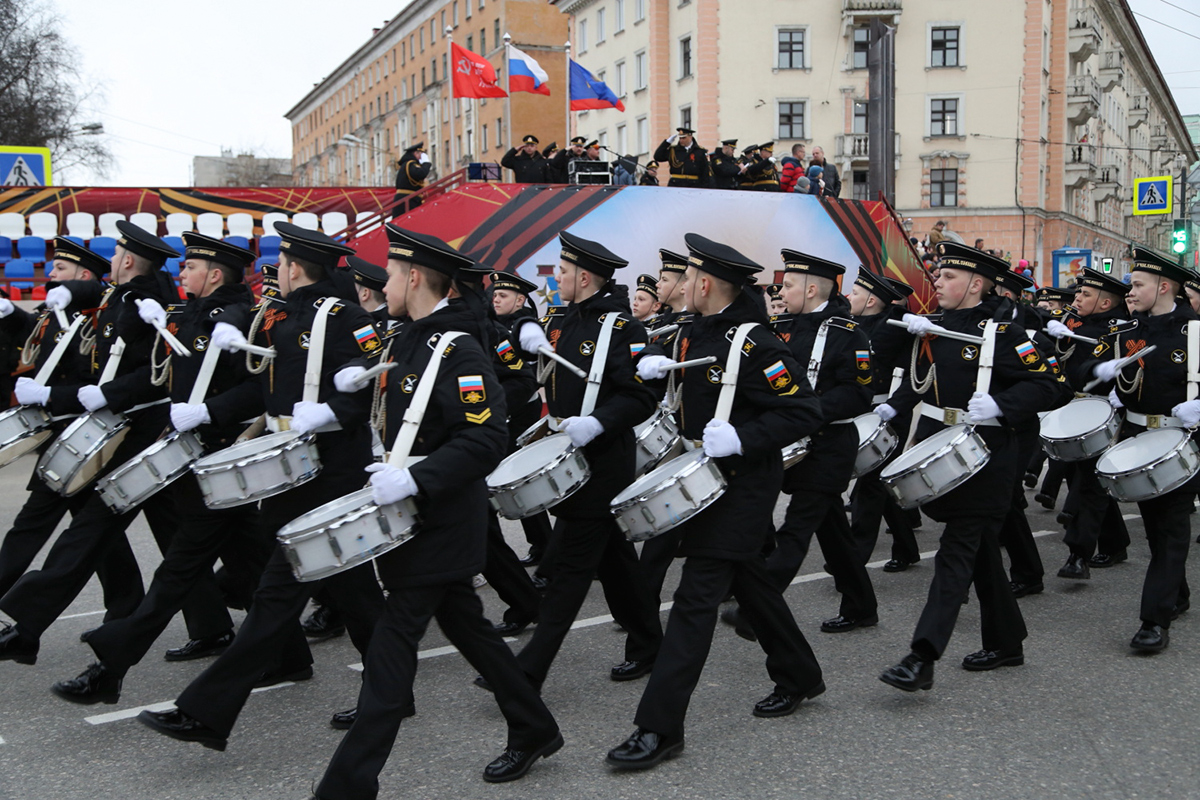
- Cadets of the school during a 2018 parade rehearsal.
- Other name: Nakhimov Naval School of the Ministry of Defense of the Russian Federation in the City of Murmansk
- Type: military academy
- Established: 1 September 2017; 8 years ago
- Founder: Government of Russia
- Affiliations: Russian Navy
- Head: Vice Admiral Alexei Maksimchuk
- Students: 240
- Location: 30 Shevchenko Street, Murmansk, Pervomaysky Administrative Okrug, Russia; 68.9056°N 33.1048°E
- Language: Russian

The Murmansk Nakhimov Naval School (Note: Russian: Мурманское Нахимовское военно-морское училище, romanized: Murmanskoye Nakhimovskoye voyenno-morskoye uchilishche) is one of five Nakhimov Naval Schools in Russia. The current head of the school is Vice Admiral Alexei Maksimchuk.

== History ==
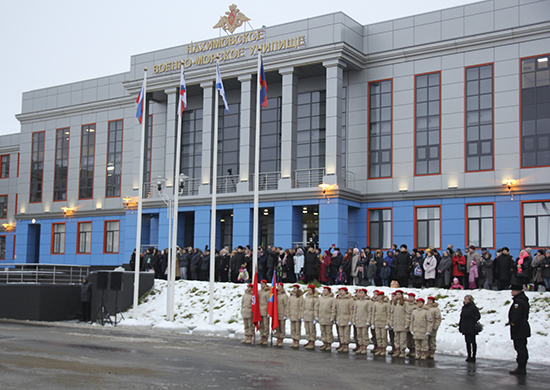
The building of the school.

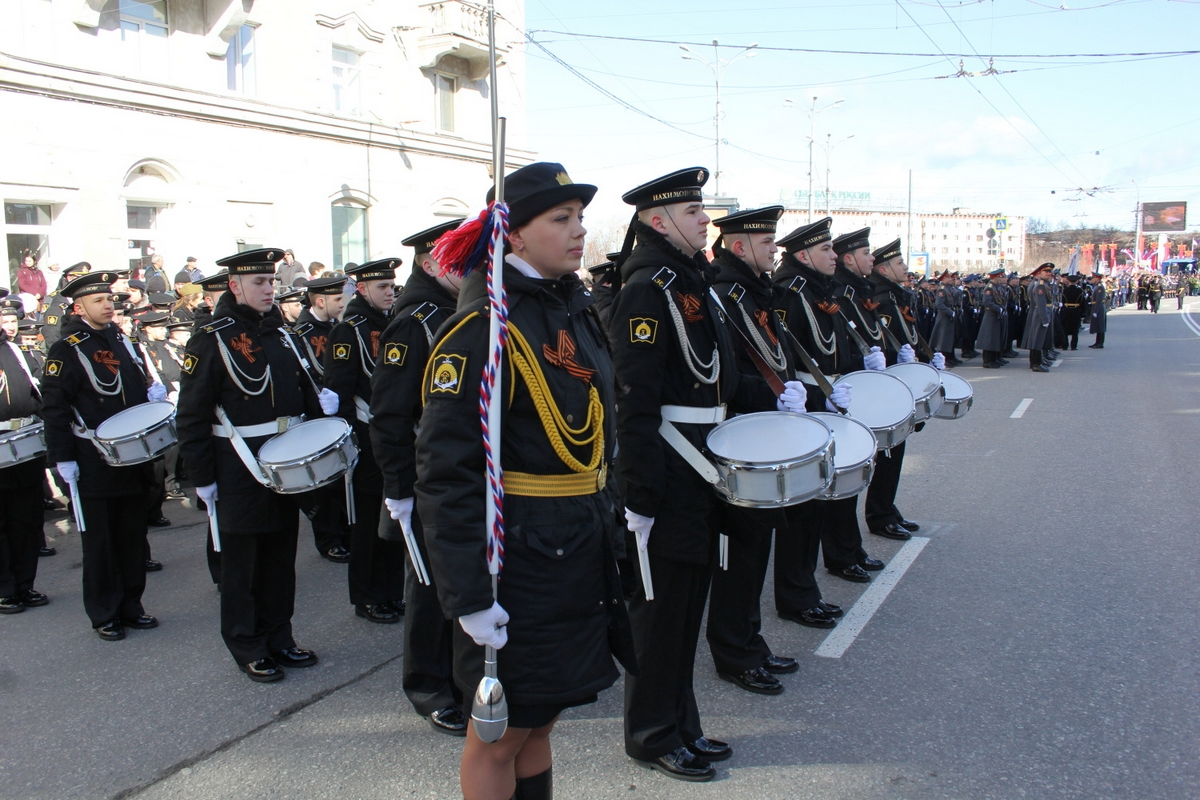
Cadets of the school in 2019.

On August 31, 2016, Russian President Vladimir Putin instructed Russian Defense Minister Army General Sergey Shoigu to establish a branch of the Nakhimov Naval School in Murmansk. Construction of the building began and continued for a little over a year when it was completed on September 1, 2017. The complex was the first Nakhimov school built in Russia since the first school was opened in St. Petersburg in 1944.

By September 2018, the school will have a 320-bed dormitory, a sports complex with a swimming pool and an ice skating rink, and an indoor sports complex with stands and a playground for mini-football and shooting. On May 9, 2018, the school took part in its first national celebration by taking part in the Victory Parade on Five Corners Square in Murmansk as part of the drum corps.

== Symbols ==
On 21 February 2017, a memorial stone was laid in Murmansk to commemorate the start of construction of the school. On March 2, 2018, Russian Defense Minister Sergei Shoigu presented the school banner of the Ministry of Defense of Russia to the school. The heraldic elements of the school (emblem and insignia) are two interval parts of the school. The emblem is the image of the golden letter "H" and the northern lights above it in a black field, inside a golden glow, resting on a diagonally crossed silver feather with a naval dagger pointing down. It was made official by order of the Commander-in-Chief of the Russian Navy on July 24, 2017.

=== Anthem ===
The anthem of the school appeared as a result of a joint initiative of Captain Alexander Nemertsov and teacher/organizer Oleg Salamatin.

For the first time, the anthem was performed at the first initiation ceremony of Nakhimovites on 28 October 2017.

== See also ==
- Nakhimov Naval School
- Suvorov Military School
