= Kronstadt Sea Cadet Corps =

Russian naval boarding school

- Кронштадтский морской кадетский корпус
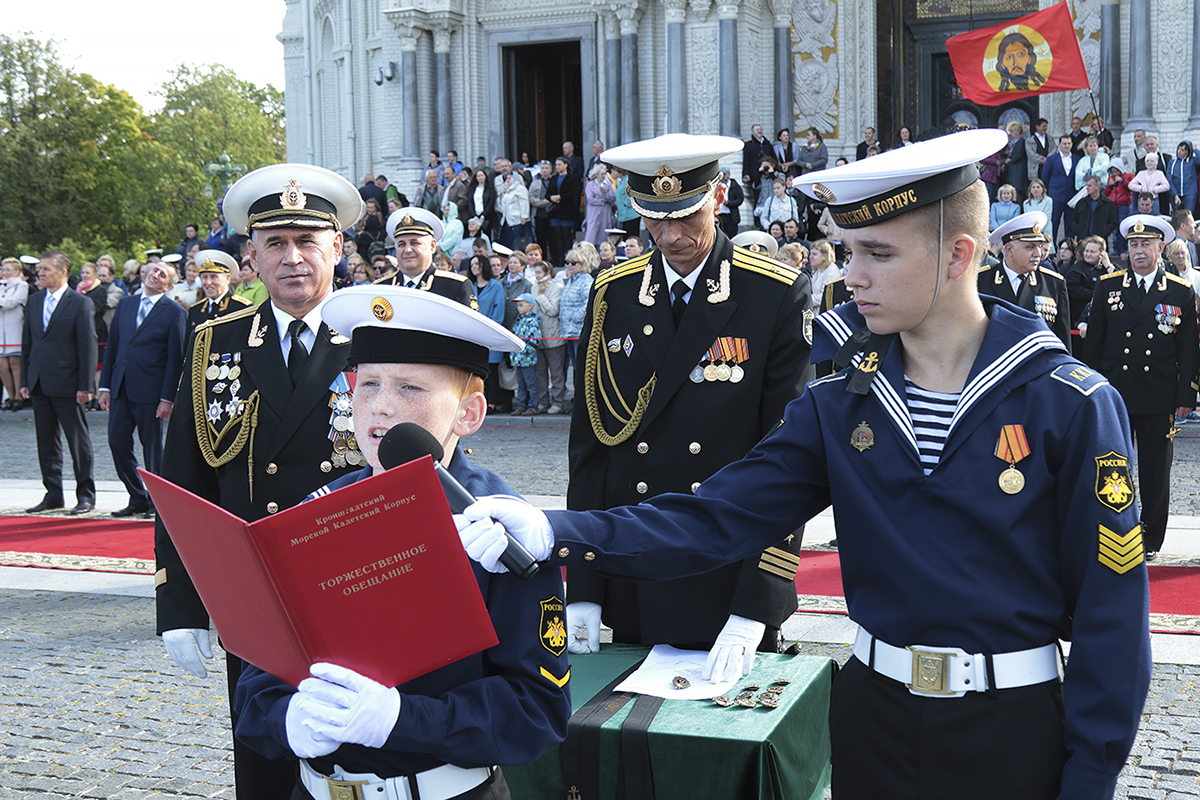
- A Kronstadt sea cadet.
- Motto: Knowledge, honor and duty! (Знание, честь и долг!)
- Type: boarding school
- Established: 1995 (date established); 2015 (reorganized)
- Affiliations: Russian Navy
- Officer in charge: Reserve Captain 1st Rank Nikolai Dovbeshko
- Academic staff: 63
- Administrative staff: 67
- Students: 560
- Location: Kronstadt, Kronshtadtsky District St. Petersburg, Russia; 59.9941°N 29.7555°E
- Language: Russian

The Kronstadt Sea Cadet Corps (Russian: Кронштадтский морской кадетский корпус, romanized: Kronshtadtsky morskoy kadetsky korpus) is a military boarding school of the Russian Navy.

== History ==
The corps maintains the traditions established by the original Russian cadet corps in the Imperial Russian Navy. The process of its creation began on 25 April 1995 by order of the Mayor of St. Petersburg Anatoly Sobchak. The corps was created at the insistence of President Boris Yeltsin and a joint decision of Minister of Defense Pavel Grachev and Mayor Sobchak. On 1 October, the first 75 pupils were enrolled in the corps at Komarovo. On 22 November, First Deputy Commander-in-Chief of the Navy, Admiral Igor Kasatonov presented to the cadet corps its first regimental colours. This day became an official holiday in the school. In early 1996, it was transformed into a naval educational institution. The decree on 19 February of that year established a seven-year training course for the cadet corps. By August of that year, the maximum attendace was determined at 700 cadets. In 2000, the first graduation ceremony took place. On 1 December 2012, Admiral Viktor Chirkov presented new colours to the corps in a presentation ceremony.

== General information ==
Only boys of 10–11 years old who are admitted into the corps. The building has 28 classrooms, 24 classrooms, with the science rooms being featuring with laboratories equipped with modern equipment. From the seventh grade, cadets learn two foreign languages: English and German. The building has an assembly hall for 200 people, and a reading room for 50 seats. Cadets train on training ships in the city. Upon graduation from the corps, cadets receive a secondary education certificate and a graduate badge, and preferred admission to universities of the Ministry of Defense of Russia without entrance exams.

== Awards ==
- Cup of the Commander-in-Chief of the Russian Navy
- Diploma of the Commander-in-Chief of the Navy (2013)
- Diploma of the Minister of Defense of Russia (2015)
- Diploma of the Minister of Defense (2015)
