= Cadet Corps (Russia) =

Type of school in Russia

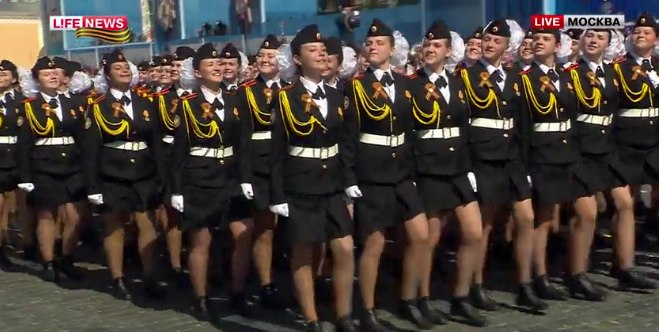
Female cadets of the Moscow National Pensions School Cadet Corps during the 2015 Moscow Victory Day Parade.

A Cadet corps (Russian: Кадетский корпус, romanized: Kadetskiy korpus), historically an admissions-based all-boys military cadets school, prepared boys to become commissioned officers in Imperial Russia. Boys entered a cadet corps between the ages of 8 and 15.

== History ==
Empress Anna Ivanovna founded the first cadet corps in Saint Petersburg, Russian Empire, in 1731. The term of education was seven years. All instructors had a military rank; they taught a program of military preparation. In 1766 Catherine the Great's educational reforms broadened the curriculum to include the sciences, philosophy, ethics, history, and international law. A graduate from the corps became a junker and had prime candidacy for a military career.

During the October Revolution and the 1917-1923 Russian Civil War, cadets and junkers largely supported the anti-bolshevik White movement. (Distinguish the military cadets of this era from the members of the Constitutional Democratic Party, known from its initials (KD) as Kadets. The Constitutional Democratic Party also opposed Bolshevism.) A small portion of cadets succeeded in evacuating with the White Army towards the end of Russian Civil War to western countries.

Many cadets who escaped alive formed cadet corps in other countries, most notably at Bela Crkva in the Kingdom of Yugoslavia, where they received the patronage of King Alexander I of Yugoslavia (reigned 1921–1934) - himself a former pupil in the Saint Petersburg Page Corps.

During World War II a number of White émigré ex-cadets joined the Axis-sponsored Russian Corps (founded in 1941) in Yugoslavia and the Guard of the general A.A.Vlasow (ROA), seeing it as a means of continuing the battle against the Bolshevik régime.

After World War II ended in 1945, with the emigration of cadets to the United States, Canada, Argentina, and Australia, White émigré cadet corps ceased to function.

== Modern era ==
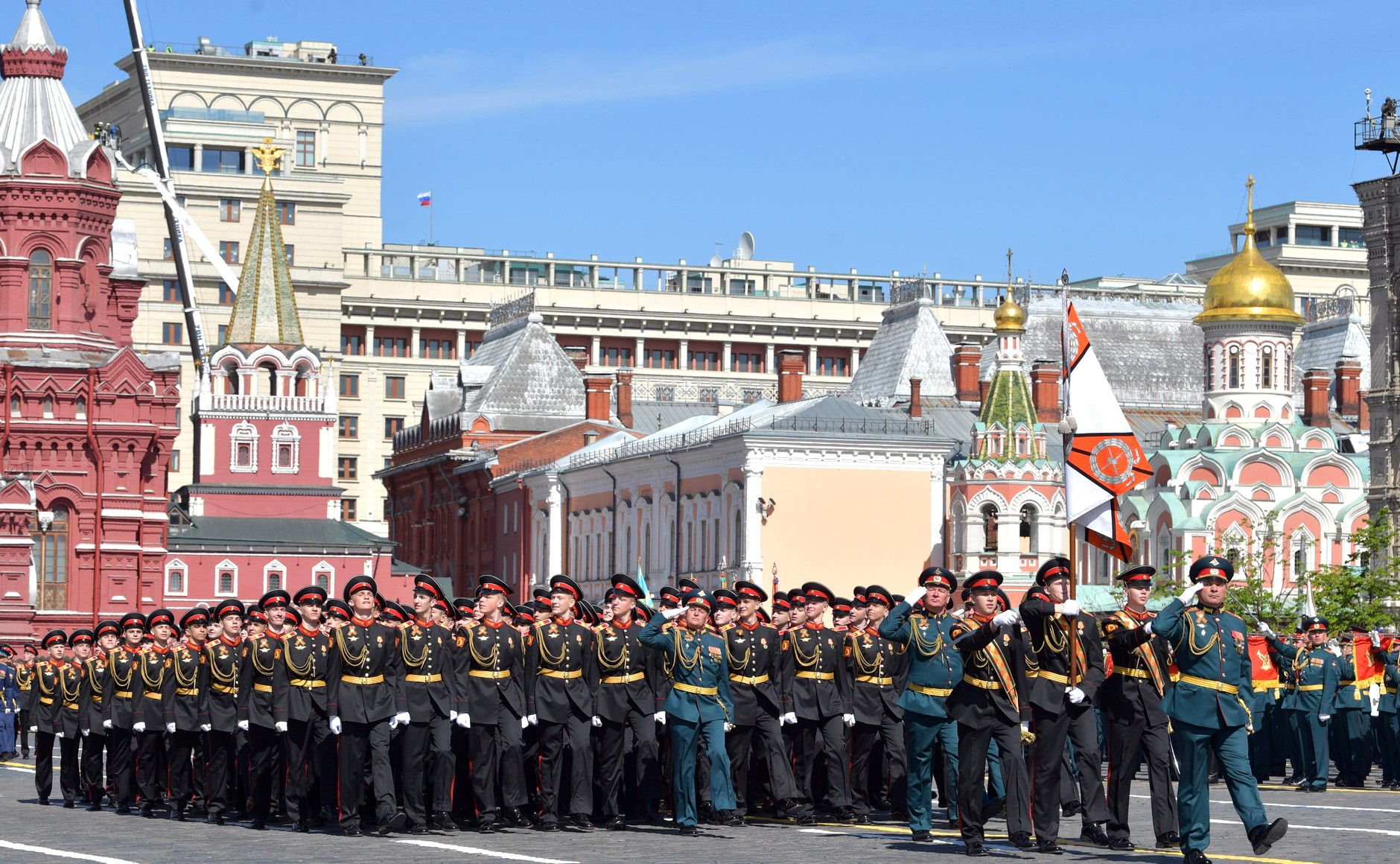
The Moscow Suvorov Military School

After the fall of the USSR in 1991, cadet corps were re-established in Russia by veterans of the armed forces and descendants of cadet corps graduates. These now educate both boys and girls, with several units named after Soviet Great Patriotic War heroes as well as after Russian military heroes through the centuries. These Cadet Corps and Cadet Schools, found in various Russian cities, aim towards preparing children for service not just in the Russian Armed Forces but also in the Ministry of Internal Affairs, the National Guard of Russia, the Ministry of Emergency Situations, the Investigative Committee of Russia and the Federal Security Service (FSB). One cadet corps prepares teens for service in the Ministry of Justice; the Moscow Diplomatic Cadet Corps educates those inclined towards future careers in the diplomatic services of the Ministry of Foreign Affairs. Traditionally, the Ground Forces-affiliated cadets use the regular army field uniform, but with the own sleeve insignias and the letters "KK" on the shoulder boards, but dress uniforms differ.

== Cadets educational establishments in the USSR and Russia ==
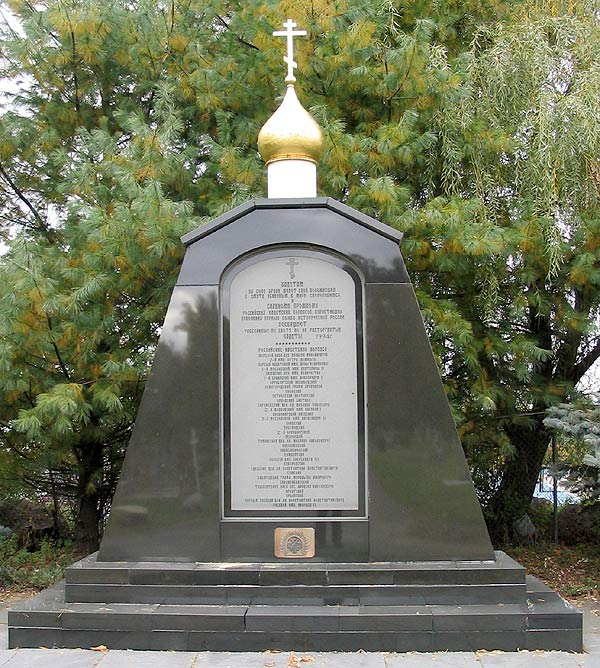
A memorial for fallen Cadets in Nanuet, NY.

=== Mainstream corps ===
- Suvorov Military School
- Nakhimov Naval School
- Ministry of Defense of Russia Girls Boarding School
- Kronstadt Sea Cadet Corps
- Moscow National Guard Presidential Cadets School
- Moscow National Pensions School Cadet Corps
- Moscow Cadet Corps of the Investigative Committee of Russia

=== Cossack corps ===
- Astrakhan Cossack Cadet Corps
- Shakhty Cossack Cadet Corps
- Aksanskiy Cossack Cadet Corps
- Aksai Cossack Cadet Corps
- Don Cadet Corps, Novocherkassk
- Novorossiysk Cossack cadet corps
- Crimean Cossack Cadet Corps
- Kuban Cossack Cadet Corps
- Yeysk Cossack Cadet Corps
- Starodub Cossack Cadet Corps

=== Other corps ===
- Saint Petersburg Rocket Artillery Cadet Corps
- St. Petersburg Cadet Corps
- Krasnoyarsk Cadet Corps
- Governor's Cadet Boarding School of the Ministry of Emergencies, Kemerovo
- Siberian Aviation Cadet Corps named after Alexander Pokryshkin Novosibirsk
- Achinsk Cadet Corps, Krasnoyarsk Territory
- Mountain Cadet Corps
- Ulan-Ude Cadet Corps
- First Moscow Cadet Corps
- Military Space Peter the Great Cadet Corps, St. Petersburg
- Military Technical Cadet Corps, Togliatti
- Irkutsk Guards Cadet Corps of Strategic Missile Forces
- Voronezh Grand Duke Mikhail Pavlovich Cadet Corps
- Moscow Justice Cadet Corps
- Moscow Cadet Corps named after Marshal Zhukov
- Karelian Cadet Corps named after Alexander Nevsky
- Ufa Airborne Cadet Corps named after Musa Gareev
- Moscow Cadet Music Corps
- St. Petersburg Cadet Course of the Federal Protective Service

== See also ==
- Cadets (youth program)
- Page Corps (Russia)
- Sea Cadet Corps (Russia)
- Military education in the Soviet Union
- Military academies in Russia
