= Moscow National Pensions Schoolgirls' Cadet School =

Russian state school

Coordinates: 55.6957°N 37.7514°E

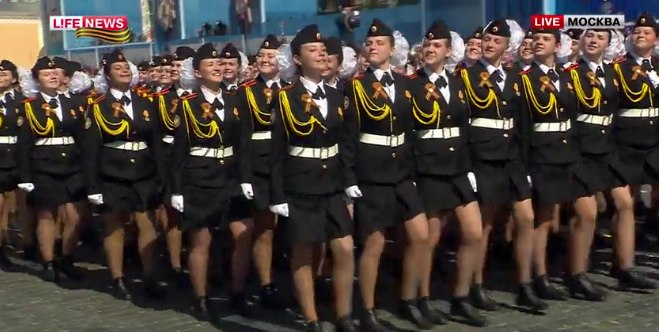
Cadets of the corps during the 2015 Moscow Victory Day Parade.

The Moscow National Pensions Schoolgirls' Cadet School (Note: Russian: Кадетская школа государственных воспитанниц Первого Московского кадетского корпуса, romanized: Kadetskaya shkola gosudarstvennykh vospitannits Pervogo Moskovskogo kadetskogo korpusa) is a Russian state school, specializing in preparing students for professional military service. The school is located in the Russian capital of Moscow. Founded in 2004, it was the first cadet school for girls in modern Russia.

== Overview ==
It was created on 1 September 2004 as a result of the reorganization of Boarding School No. 54. It was pursuant to the order of the Government of Moscow on 21 June 2004 "On the reorganization of state educational institutions of the system of the Moscow Department of Education". In addition to the subjects of the school curriculum, the basics of state and military service, personal protective equipment, traffic rules, medical knowledge and firearm safety are also studied. Attention is paid to drill and patriotic education in the school. The basics of drill and fire training are conducted by officers of the 154th Preobrazhensky Independent Commandant's Regiment. Since 2005, pupils of the cadet boarding school have been taking part in marchpasts on Red Square every 7 November dedicated to the 1941 October Revolution Parade. On 9 May 2015, they took part in the Moscow Victory Day Parade for the first time; carrying the Flag of Moscow, becoming the first female contingent to march in the anniversary military parade. took part in the Victory Parade on Red Square. After the positive response of the girls' cadet company that year, the following parade in 2016 parade featured for the very first time active female officers and other ranks of the Russian Armed Forces marching in the parade.

== See also ==
- Moscow Suvorov Military School
- Cadet Corps (Russia)
- Boarding School for Girls of the Ministry of Defense of Russia
