= Dontsov =

Dontsov (masculine, Russian: Донцов) or Dontsova (feminine, Russian: Донцова) is a Russian surname. Notable people with the surname include:

- Darya Dontsova (born 1952), Russian journalist, screenwriter, writer, and television presenter
- Dmytro Dontsov (1883–1973), Ukrainian activist, journalist, publisher, writer, and literary critic
