= Vladimir Makarenko =

Russian translator and lexicographer (1933–2008)

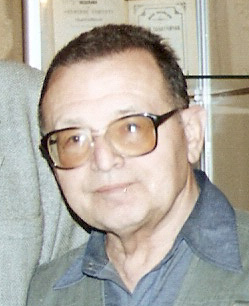
Vladimir Makarenko

Vladimir Afanasyevich Makarenko (Russian: Влади́мир Афана́сьевич Мака́ренко; 9 December 1933, in Moscow – 13 February 2008, in Moscow) was a Russian orientalist, linguist, lexicographer, and translator.

== Biography ==
In 1952 he graduated from the Moscow Suvorov Military School with honours and continued his education at the Faculty of Economics, Lomonosov Moscow State University (MGU). In 1957–1964 after graduating from MGU, V. A. Makarenko used to work as an editor and later as the Chief-Editor at the State Publishers for National and Foreign Dictionaries (Moscow). He edited and published the ever first in Russia Tagalog–Russian Dictionary (1960), Russian–Tagalog Dictionary (1965) and some others. Later he compiled Malayalam–Russian Dictionary (1971, in cooperation with M. S. Andronov), Kannada–Russian Dictionary (1979, in cooperation with M. S. Andronov and M. A. Dashko) and several other dictionaries and phrasebooks which were warmly greeted by critics.

In 1960–1964, V. A. Makarenko was doing PhD studies in linguistics at the Institute of Oriental Languages, MGU. In 1960 he initiated the teaching of Tagalog as second oriental language for students from Malay/Indonesian Department. Since 1964 V. A. Makarenko has been teaching Tagalog and been giving lectures on theoretical linguistics (introduction to special philology, theoretical grammar, historical linguistics), conducted special seminars on Austronesian linguistics. In 1966 he got PhD with thesis "Morphological Structure in Modern Tagalog". In 1970 he became Ass. Professor. He contributed much in creating programmes (curriculum) and textbooks. He used to be a Scientific Secretary of "The Journal of Moscow University" (Orientalistics) since its foundation and a member of Editing Boards of some other publications, including "Vostochnaya Kollektsiya".

Since 1985 when Tagalog Department was temporarily closed V. A. Makarenko began working at the Institute of Scientific Information, Russian Academy of Science (INION RAN). There he became the Head of the Asian-African Department in charge of the linguistics bibliography and the editor of bibliography Index "Linguistics". In 1997 the Tagalog Department at MGU has been restored and V. A. Makarenko again began teaching Tagalog and Philippines literature there. He has been always active also in the field of linguistics researches both in his country and on international arena as well. He was a member of some important associations such as All-Russian Orientalistic Society, Nusantara Society, Russian Writers Union, Russian Journalists Union, a life member of Linguistic Society of the Philippines. He used to be a visiting Professor of La Salle University. He participated in many international conferences, among them International Conference on Linguistics in Bucharest (1967), Seminar "National Build-Up and Literary/Cultural Process in SEA" (1996) in Moscow, Russian-French Symposium on SEA in Moscow (1997), EUROSEAS Conference in Hamburg (1998), ECIMS- XI in Moscow (1999) etc.

V. A. Makarenko has published about 60 books and large articles on lexicography, orthography, social linguistics in Russian, English, Tagalog, Tamil, more than 50 reviews, including those in English, about 30 reference and synopsis articles, more than 100 popular articles and articles for encyclopedias in Russia, Ukraine, Czech Republic, Slovakia, India, Thailand, Malaysia, the Philippines, Japan, China, Singapore.

== Publications ==
1. (editor) Tagal’sko-russkiy slovar’ (Tagalog–Russian Dictionary). – Moscow, 1959. 388 p.
2. Some data on Indian cultural influences in South-East Asia. To the history of the Origin and Development of the Old Filipino script // Tamil Culture. Madras, 1964. Vol. 11, N 1. p. 58–91.
3. O stepeni rodstva tagal’skogo i indoneziyskogo yazikov (About the degree of similarity among Tagalog and Indonesian) // Voprosi filologii stran Yugo-Vostochnoy Azii (Philological problems of SEA countries. Collection of articles ). Moscow, 1965. p. 25–46.
4. Tagal’sko-indonezijskie slovoobrazovatel’nye paralleli (Tagalog-Indonesian word formation parallels) // Voprosy filologii stran Jugo-Vostočnoy Azii (Philological problems of SEA countries. Collection of articles) – Moscow: Moscow State University, 1965. p. 73–105
5. (editor) Russko-tagal’skiy slovar’ (Russian–Tagalog Dictionary). Moscow, 1965. 760 h.
6. Tamil loan-words in some languages of South-East Asia // The Inter-national Association of Tamil Research News. [Kuala Lumpur], 1966. p. 10–11.
7. Morfologicheskaya struktura slova v sovremennom tagal’skom yazike (Words Morphological Structure in Modern Tagalog) // Lomonosovskie chteniya (Lomonosov Readings). April 1965. Moscow: MGU, 1966. p. 57–64
8. Izuchenie v SSSR filippinskih yazikov do i posle Oktyabrya (Studies on Philippine languages in the Soviet Union before and after October Revolution) // Narodi Azii i Afriki (Peoples of Asia and Africa). Moscow, 1967, N 6. p. 100–107.
9. Tamilological Studies in Russian and in the Soviet Union // Tamil Studies Abroad. [Kuala Lumpur], 1968. p. 91–108.
10. The Purists are net (Special Report “The Philippine language dilemma” // Graphic. Manila, July 1969. p. 26–28.
11. Tagal’skoe slovoobrazovanie (Word Structure in Tagalog). Moscow, 1970. 172 p.
12. Razvitie sovremennoy yazikovoy situatsii v Filippinskoy respublike i eyo osnovnie tendetsii (A Development of language situation in the Philippine Republic and its main prospects) // Problemi izucheniya ya-zikovoy situatsii i yazikoviy vopros v stranah Azii i Severnoy Afriki (Problems of the studies of language situation and language question in Asia and North African countries). Moscow, 1970. p. 156–170.
13. Jazykovaja situatsija na Filippinach v proshlom i nastojaščem (Language situation in the Philippines: past and present) // “Narody Azii i Afriki” (“Peoples of Asia and Africa”) Moscow, 1970. N5.
14. (translation into Russian) Amado V. Hernandez. Rice grains. Moscow, 1971. 224 p.
15. South Indian influence on Philippine languages // Philippine Journal of Linguistics. Manila, 1972. Vol. 23, NN 1–2. p. 65–77.
16. Printsipi stroeniya slovoobrazovatel’nih sistem imyon sushestvitel’nih v indoneziyskom i tagal’skom yazikah (Principles of nouns structures in Indonesian and Tagalog) // Vestnik Moskovskogo universiteta (Journal of Moscow University). – “Vostokovedenie” (Orientalistics). 1973 N 1. p. 68–78.
17. General Characteristics of Filipino Word formation // Parangal kay Cecilo Lopez. Quezon City, 1973. p. 196–205.
18. Osnovnie problemi issledovaniya drevnefilippinskogo pis’ma (Main Problems in Researching of Old Philippines Writing // Sovetskaya et-nografiya (Soviet Ethnography) Moscow, 1973. N 2. p. 42–50.
19. (translation into Russian) Filippinskie novelli (Philippines Short Stories). Alma-Ata, 1973. 158 p.
20. “Philippine Journal of Linguistics” (1970–1972) // Narodi Azii i Afriki (Peoples of Asia and Africa). Moscow, 1974, N 3. p. 169–174.
21. (translation into Russian) Sovremennaya filippinskaya poeziya (Modern Philippines Poetry). Moscow, 1974. 312 p.
22. Osnovnie cherti poslevoennoy filippinskoy literaturi (Main features of Philippines Literature after the War) // Literaturi sovremennoy Azii v so-vremennuyu epohu (Modern Contemporary Asian Literature). Moscow, 1974. p. 171–201.
23. Yazikovaya situatsiya i yazikovaya politika na Filippinah: osnovnie problemi issledovaniya (Language situation and language policy in the Philippines: fundamental problems) // Yazikovaya politika v afro-aziatskih stranah (Language policy in Afro-Asian countries) Moscow, 1977. p. 150–172.
24. Programmi po teorii indoneziyskogo yazika (Programmes on the Theory of Indonesian). Moscow: MGU, 1977. 105 p.
25. (translation into Russian) Bambukovaya fleita (Bamboo Flute). Moscow, 1977. 293 p.
26. (editor) Wikang Pilipino (Textbook on Pilipino). M.: MGU, 1978. 183 p.
27. Evolutsiya sovremennogo tagal’skogo yazika (Evolution of Modern Tagalog) // Narodi Azii i Afriki (Peoples of Asia and Africa). Moscow, 1979, N 3. p. 114–122.
28. Jazykovaja situatsija (Language situation) // Filippiny. Spravočnik (The Philippines. Reference book). Moscow: “Nauka”, 1979.
29. Indonesian Linguistics in the Soviet Union in the 60’s and 70’s // Bijdragen tot de taal, land- en folkenkunde. Leiden, 1980. Deel 136, 4-e Aflev. p. 440–462 (in cooperation with L. N. Demidyuk).
30. Programmi po teorii malayziyskogo yazika (Programmes on the Theory of Malay). Moscow: MGU, 1981. 44p.
31. A Preliminary Annotated Bibliography of Pilipino Linguistics (1604–1976). Ed. By Andrew Gonzalez, FSC, and Carolina N. Sacris. Manila, 1981. XIV. 257 p. (with Biodata).
32. The most recent phenomena in the Evolution of Contemporary Tagalog language and Prognosis of its development // Asian and African Studies. Bratislava, 1981. Vol. 17. p. 165–177 (in cooperation with J. Genzor).
33. Yazikovaya politika yaponskih okkupatsionnih vlastey na Filippinah v 1942–1945 godah (Language Policy in the Philippines During the Japanese Occupation 1942–1945) // Voprosi yaponskoy filologii (Problems of Japanese Philology). Moscow: MGU, 1981. Vip. 5. p. 113–123.
34. (translation into Russian) Iz filippinskoy poezii XX veka (From the Philippines Poetry). Moscow, 1981. 255 p.
35. Etnolingvisticheskie protsessi v stranah avstroneziyskih yazikov: Indoneziya, Malayziya, Filippini (Ethno linguistic Processes in Austronesian Countries: Indonesia, Malaysia, the Philippines) // Natsional’niy vopros v stranah Vostoka (National question in Asian Countries). Moscow, 1982. p. 139–154.
36. Problemi razrabotki istorii filippinskogo natsional’nogo yazikiznaniya (Some problems of the history of Philippine national linguistics) // Te-preticheskie problemi vostochnogo yazikoznaniya (Theoretical problems of Oriental linguistics). Moscow, 1982. N 6. p. 115–123.
37. Yazikoviy vopros v Respublike Filippin (Language question in the Philippines) // Narodi Azii i Afriki (Peoples of Asia and Africa). Moscow, 1983, N 2. p. 112–117.
38. Soviet Studies of the Philippines. Manila, 1983. 38 p.
39. (translation into Russian) Sovremennaya filippinskaya novella 60-70 godov (Modern Philippines Short Stories of Years 60–70). Moscow, 1984. 432 p.
40. Izučenie malych filippinskich jazykov (A Study of Minor Philippine Languages) // Referativnyj žurnal (Essay Journal). Obščest-vennye nauki za rubežom (Social sciences abroad). Ser. 6. “Jazykoznanije” (“Linguistics”). Moscow: INION, 1985. N6.
41. (translation into Russian) Vo imya zhizni (In the name of Life). Moscow, 1986. 351 p.
42. Spetsificheskie osobennosti yazika sovremennoy filippinskoy angloya-zichnoy pressi (Specific Features of the Philippine Press Language in English). Moscow: INION, 1988. 131 p.
43. Filippinskie jazyki; Bikol'skij jazyk; Bisajskie jazyki; Ilo kanskij jazyk; Pangasinanskij jazyk; Tagal'skij jazyk (Philippine languages; Bicol language; Bisayan languages; Ilokano language; Pangasinan language; Tagalog) // Lingvističeskij entsiklopedičeskij slovar’ (Linguistic Encyclopedical Dictionary). Moscow: “Sovetskaja entsiklopedija”, 1990.
44. Makarenko V. A. Jazykovaja situatsija i jazykovaja politika na Filippinach (Language situation and language policy in the Philippines) // Jazykovie problemy Rossijskoj Federatsii i zakony o jazykach (Language problems of Russian Federation and laws of languages). Moscow: Scientific council “Language and Society”, Institute of Linguistics, Russian Academy of Science, 1994.
45. Reflection of the National Idea in the Literature and Arts of the Philippines // National Build-Up and Literary/Cultural Process in SEA. Moscow, 1997. p. 143–148.
46. Yazikovaya situatsiya i yazikovaya politika v Yugo-Vostochnoy Azii: sravnitel’noe issledovanie (Language situation and language policy in the South-East Asia: comparative study // Vestnik Moskovskogo Universiteta (Journal of Moscow University). Seriya 13. Vostokovedenie (Series 13. Orientalistics), N 2. Moscow, 1999. p. (in cooperation with V. A. Pogadaev).
47. Language Situation and Language Policy in Southeast Asia // Parangalcang Brother Andrew. Festschrift for Andrew Gonzales on His Sixtieth Birthday. Editors: Ma Lourdes S. Bautista, Teodoro A. Llamzon, Bonifacio P. Sibayan. Linguistic Society of the Philippines. Manila, 2000. Pp. 213–225. (in cooperation with V. A. Pogadaev).
48. The language policy in Malay-speaking countries as a paradigm of development // Indonesian and Malay World in the Second Millennium: Milestones of Development. Papers presented at the 11th European Colloquium on Indonesian and Malay Studies. Moscow, 29 June – 1 July 1999. Moscow, 2000. p. 138–150. (in cooperation with V. A. Pogadaev)

== Bibliography ==
- European Directory of South-East Asian Studies. Compiled and edited by Kees van Duk and Jolanda Leemburg-den Hollander. Leiden: KITLV Press, 1998, 335
- Pogadaev, Victor. Pengkaji Linguistik yang Dikagumi //Dewan Bahasa, bil. 10, jilid 3. Kuala Lumpur, 2001, 60–63.
- Pogadaev, Victor. V.A. Makarenko. On the Occasion of his 70th Anniversary – Philippine Journal of Linguistics, vol. 33, N 2, Dec 2002, 83–87.
