= Psalter of Ivan the Terrible =

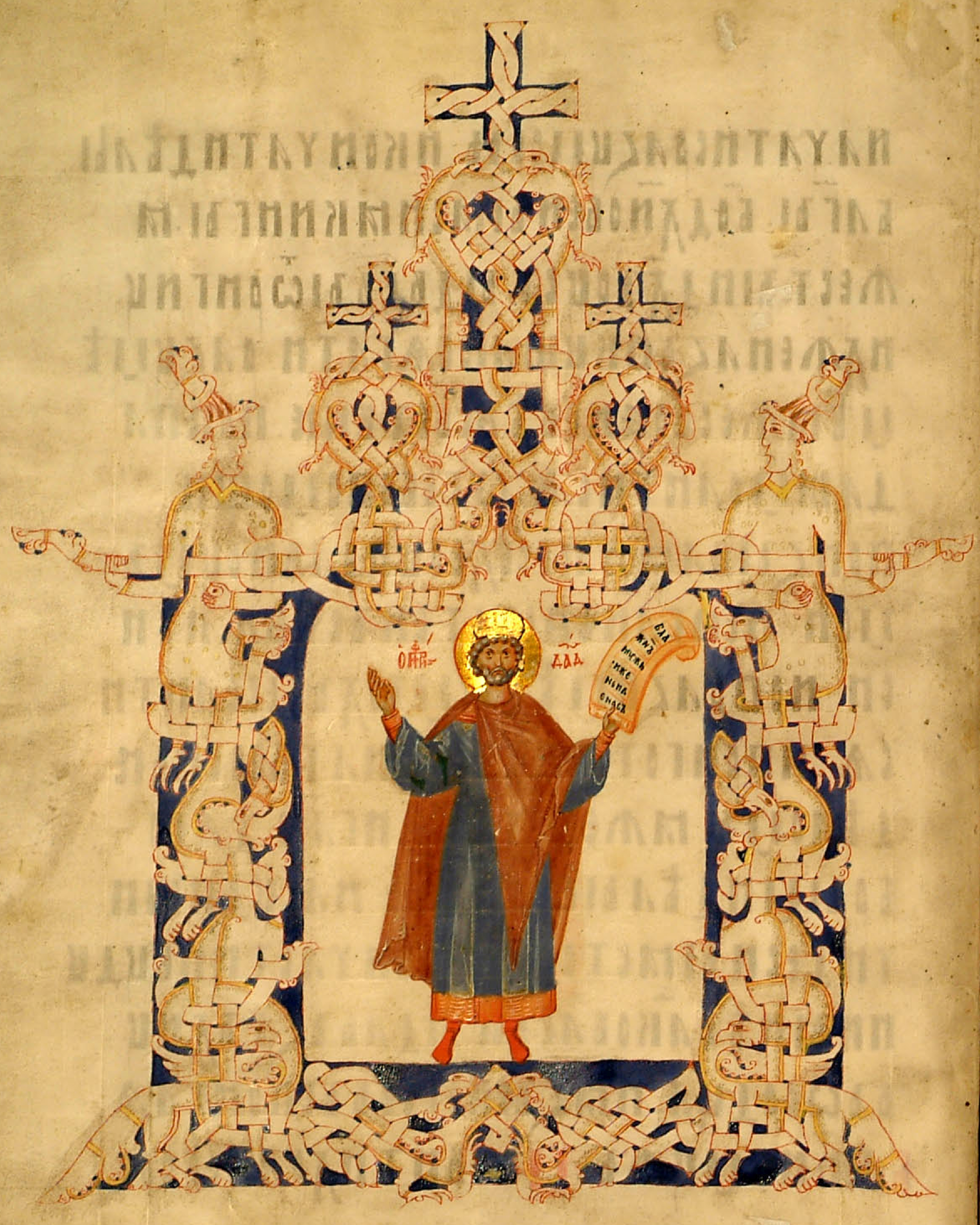
Miniature of King David (f.19)

The Psalter of Ivan the Terrible is an illuminated Russian manuscript codex of the Psalter in Old Church Slavonic, probably produced in the late 14th century in Novgorod. It is named after Tsar Ivan IV "the Terrible" (1530–1584), because it was in his personal possession. Ivan then gifted it to the Trinity Lavra of St. Sergius, where it was kept until 1917. It is now in the Russian State Library (inventory number Ф.304.3 No.7).

The book contains elaborate painted initials and, on some pages, decorative headpieces with architectural motives. Two pages contain human figures in the style of Orthodox icon painting: one illustration of King David holding a psalm scroll, and another illustration featuring the psalm author Asaph.

Decorations are drawn in a distinctive style with multiple interwoven, knotted bands featuring animal heads and other animal motives. This style is characteristic of the art of Novgorod in this period. The quality of the miniatures has given rise to the conjecture that the artist may have been related to the circle of Theophanes the Greek, the leading icon painter of the period.

It is not known how the book came into the possession of Ivan the Terrible from its presumed place or origin, Novgorod, but one hypothesis is that it may have been taken during the 1570 Sack of Novgorod, when Ivan's troops raided the treasures of Novgorod cathedral.
