= Darya Dontsova =

Russian writer (born 1952)

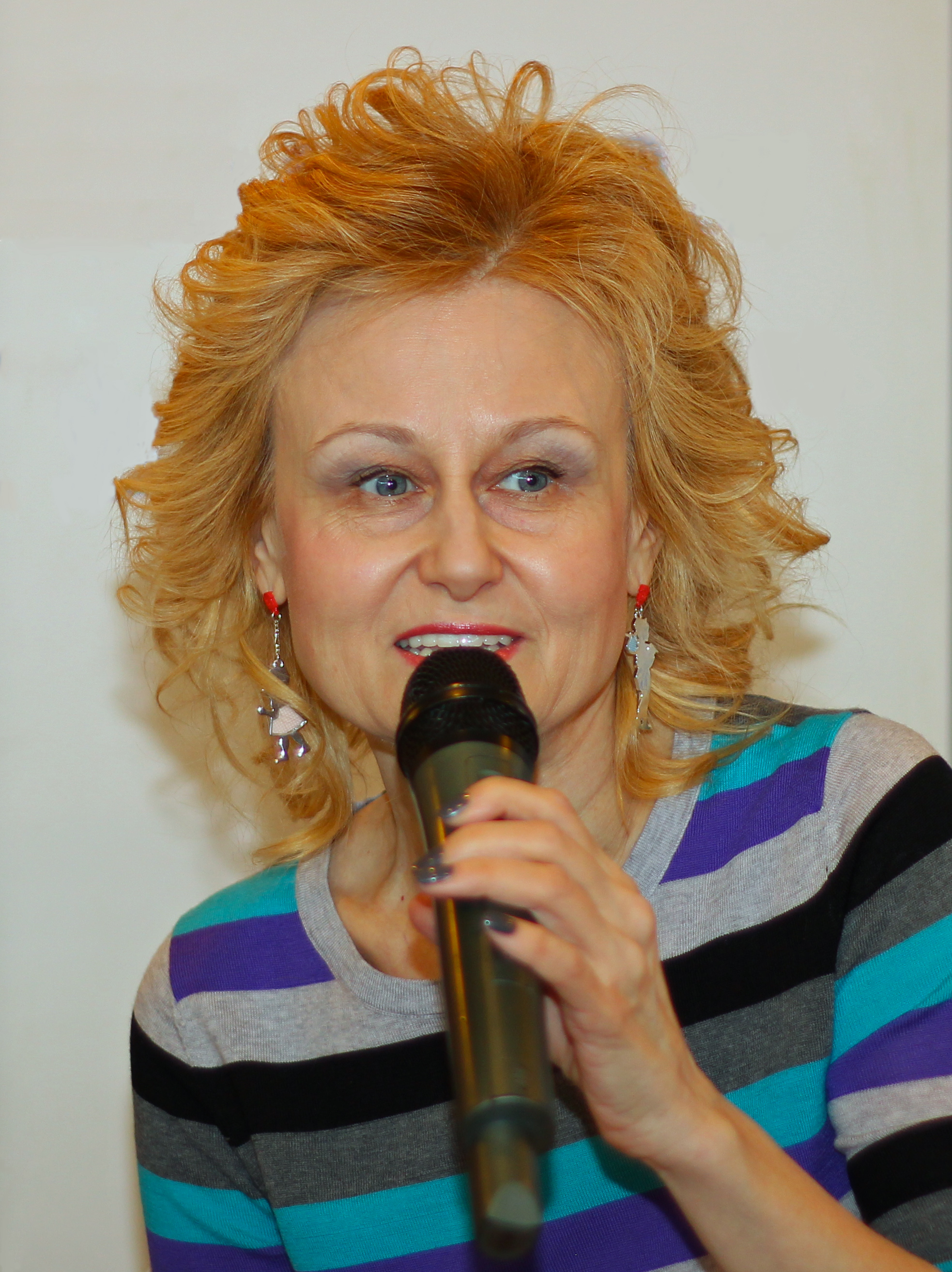
- Darya Dontsova during her autograph session in Moscow, 2011.
- Born: Agrippina Arkadyevna Vasilyeva; June 7, 1952 (age 74); Moscow, Russia,
- Occupations: Writer, journalist, screenwriter, TV presenter
- Writing career
- Pen name: Darya Dontsova
- Period: 1999-till now
- Genre: Ironic detective
- Notable works: Krutyye naslednichki, 1st published book, 1999
- Darya Dontsova's voice Dontsova on the Echo of Moscow program, 30 January 2008

Daria Dontsova (real name: Agrippina Arkadyevna Dontsova (formerly Vasilyeva)) (Russian: Агриппи́на Арка́дьевна Донцо́ва (Васи́льева); born 7 June 1952 in Moscow), is a Russian writer, screenwriter, radio, television host, and author of many detective novels. She is a member of the Union of Writers of Russia. According to official data from the Russian Book Chamber, Dontsova was the best-selling author of adult fiction in Russia for a number of years. (Note: Russian Book Chamber. www.bookchamber.ru. Retrieved December 9, 2016.)

== Biography ==
=== Genealogy ===
Dontsova was born on June 7, 1952, to her parents Mosconcert director Tamara Stepanovna Nowacki (14 April 1917 – 11 March 2008), (Note: Darya Dontsova buried mother Days pv. Retrieved December 9, 2016.) and a little-known Soviet writer and OGPU employee Arkady Nikolaevich Vassiliev (16 March 1907 - August 1972). Dontsova's father came from a working-class family. His grandfather Nikolay Vasiliev worked at a textile factory, grandmother (after whom Dontsova got its name) served as a day laborer. Before the birth of Dontsova, they broke up. At the time of the birth girl`s parents divorced, according to the documents the father had been married to the journalist of the newspaper "Pravda" Faina Borisovna. By that time, he was married to Galina Nikolaevnaso Dontsova has a half-sister Isolde, who is older 20 years.

From her mother`s side Dontsova has Polish and Cossack origin. Her maternal grandfather Stephen Nowacki was a Polish communist, who, along with his brother Jacek was one of the associates of Felix Dzerzhinsky. Grandmother Afanasia Shabanova from Kislovodsk was from a wealthy family. They, being married, moved to Moscow in 1916. In 1937, Stephen was arrested charged in case of Tukhachevsky and he died in one of the camps, allegedly under the Annunciation (later was posthumously rehabilitated). Anticipating arrest, Stefan divorced his wife, Tamara and his daughter were safe.

=== Early life ===
After the arrest of Stephen, Athanasius Tamara were evicted in the barracks on Skakovaya street, and the first few years Dontsova lived there. The parents decided to get married in February 1953 when Athanasius received notification from which it followed that a month later with her daughter and granddaughter evicted from Moscow, so Arkady decided to go with them. The registration was on a memorable day March 6, and after learning about the death of Joseph Stalin, delayed marriage. They officially married only in 1959, when Dontsova was supposed to go to school.

In 1954, the barracks were settled out, and Dontsova with her grandmother moved into a room in a communal apartment on Kirov Street. Parents could not live with them because of the small living room area and lived in an apartment in Arcadia Lavrushinsky Lane, which he shared with Viktor Shklovsky, but again, because of the small size there could not settle down four. Dontsova was reunited with her parents only in 1957, when they moved to a new building near the station Airport.

Since early childhood parents were trying to teach Dontsova music and literature. For a start she was taken to music school and there the headmistress, having listened to the girl, said that "for the first time faced with such a case, when the bear came not on the ear, and sat on her head entirely and sits there until now." Then Athanasius and Tamara, as a music fan themselves, began to take Dontsova to the conservatory, theater, opera and ballet. In her autobiography Dontsova recalls that, due to the complete lack of musical ear, all this has imposed on her only sadness.

At school, Dontsova, according to her, did not enjoy a special prestige among classmates. She was very good at the humanities and foreign languages, but she was very bad at the mathematical sciences. Even before she went to school, she had two governesses. One was an ethnic German woman, the second - a Frenchwoman, and that is why the two did not speak Russian. So before going to school Dontsova learned to speak German and French well. However, she was more successful in learning German when in 1964 went with her father to Germany (for unknown reasons, one Arcadiy`s book was chosen to publish outside the Eastern Bloc), she brought a bunch of detectives, that is why many detective classics - Dick Francis, Rex Stout, Georgette Heyer, James Hadley Chase - Dontsova first read in German.

Due to the fact that her father was a writer, Dontsova all summer vacation spent in Peredelkino. She was a very close friend with Valentin Kataev granddaughter and also she made friends with Korney Chukovsky.

=== Career ===
She graduated from the MSU Faculty of Journalism, then she worked as a journalist. During a serious illness she took up writing detective novels, which have become very popular. She is fluent in German and French (she studied at a French language school).

=== Family ===
Twice divorced, married for the third time in 1983 with Alexander Ivanovich Dontsov. The husband Alexander has is a son from a previous marriage - Dmitriy Dontsov (born in 1973.).

Darya has two children: a son Arkadiy (born 1972) from her first marriage (a criminal case was filed in 2009 against him) (Note: Arkady Vasilyev suspected of attempted murder) and the daughter Maria Dontsova born in the 3rd marriage (1986). In 2013, Maria Dontsova, graduated from the Moscow State University named after MV Lomonosov Moscow State University with a degree in "Psychology", married Yuri Subbotin (IT-programmer). December 29, 2015, Maria and Yuri gave birth to son Michael - grandson of Daria Dontsova.

The son Arcadiy has a son - Nikita (grandson of the writer).

Half-sister - Isolde Arkadevna, is a wife of party leader VN Yagodkina.

=== Social work ===
In 1998, the writer was diagnosed with breast cancer. She underwent several operations and chemotherapy (as the writer says, the book "The wife of my husband," she wrote during one of the courses of "chemistry", sitting on a stool in the bathroom next to the toilet), but won her disease. (Note: Olga Shablinsky. "I chose life!" Daria Dontsova - the victory over cancer, lost teeth and cakes around the corner // Argumenty i Fakty. - 2013. - № 33 (1710) of 14 August. - pp. 46-47.)

Now Daria Dontsova is actively helping other women to go through this ordeal. In 2008, Daria Dontsova became Ambassador of the charitable program of Avon "Together Against Breast Cancer".

Dontsova appeals to all women who are in a similar life situation, with an appeal not to give up: "With oncology is possible to fight and to live quite comfortably. If you said "oncology", it does not mean that the next station is "crematorium". (Note: Olga Shablinsky. "I chose life!" Daria Dontsova - the victory over cancer, lost teeth and cakes around the corner // Argumenty i Fakty. - 2013. - № 33 (1710) of 14 August. - pp. 46-47.)

In 2012. Vladimir Putin included her in the composition of the Public Television Council. (Note: Approved the composition of the Council of Public Television. // Official site of the president of Russia (18.07.2012). Retrieved October 20, 2015.)

== Activity ==
Dontsova novels are divided into six cycles, the protagonists of which have similarities with the author (according to the traits of character, told in one of her interview).

Darya Vasileva is a rich woman living in the suburban village Lozhkino with her family and animals. She makes friends with the police colonel Alexander Degtyarev. She has two children - a son Arcadiy and a daughter Masha . In the past, Dasha was married several times, worked as a teacher of the French language in the Moscow university, receiving little money. She lived with her family in a small apartment in Medvedkovo on the outskirts of Moscow. This character is the closest to the author. Her main hobby is pets. At home her character has got a lot of cats and dogs, one of them a pug named Huchik. There were several candidates for the husbands: Nazar, Yarik and Burdiuk. For some time she was dating with all of them at the same time. That is why in the book "The mistress of an Egyptian mummy" she has earned a bad name. She chose Burdiuk, but after his infidelity left him. She became a well known TV presenter. She has her own small "skeleton in the closet" - at a young age she brought to suicide Roitberg Andrew (he was in a manic-depressive state, and because of that Daria can not be a killer). In the book "Six acres for Robinson" she had to become a plasterer Darya Vasilieva, because she needs people to think that a lover of private investigation is becoming a victim of the killer-poisoner. In this book, Dasha met with Professor Felix Manevin, whom she continues to meet in next three books - "Fingers Chinese fan", "Honey journey the three of us" and " Miss Marple private dance." Shegets calls with threats over the last books. In the book "Samovar with champagne" Manevin and Daria are getting married.

The heroine of another series, Evlampiya Romanova (born in 1963) in the past - Yefrosinya Romanova, late child and the long-awaited daughter of Soviet general-scientist and opera singer, graduated from the Conservatory Harp, once married, after the divorce changed her name, and learned to cook. Lampa (Lamp) opened her own detective agency, where she worked as a private detective, making friends with the police Major Vladimir Kostin. According to the plot she got: the cat Semiramis and Pingva, the cat Claus, pugs Ada, Mulia, Plusha, Fenya, Kapa and two other dogs Staffordshire Terrier Rachel and mongrel Ramik, hamsters Kesha, Petya, Leonardo and toad Gertrude. He adopts a girl Lisa and educates Kirill (friend Katya's son, who went with the eldest son and his wife to America to work). Later, she married Max Wolf and acquired two pugs: Musya and black Zefirka. Also she has a mother in-law Capitolina, boutiques owner in Russia and the United States. In the last book she and her husband adopted two children: a boy Yegor and a girl Kisa.

Viola Tarakanova (born 1965). She gets knowledge of the German language from the writer . The heroine was married to Major Oleg Kuprin, an investigator from Petrovka, 38, but divorced, worked as a tutor of German, wrote detective stories under the pseudonym Arina Violova. Vilka (Fork) is indifferent to animals.The cats Cleopatra and Sonny, the dog Dyushka live in her apartment. Also Viola a friend friend Tamara, who lived with her, along with her daughter and a husband. But they terribly quarreled and now live separately. She had a lover Yuri Shumakov, but after his betrayal, they broke up. After the murder of lawyer Lityagin staged by FSB she lived in the guise of Violetta Taranova. After that she dated Konstatin Fokin (Franklin). But because of his marriage to Vlada Karelina they broke up to. But soon it turned out that he was married to Vlada by force. In the last book a billionaire Ivan Zaretsky proposed her. In the book "The horror on the wings of night" she left Constantine by Zaretsky request.

Ivan Podushkin is the son of a Soviet writer who works as a secretary at a private investigator Eleanor. He is a polite man of high moral principles. Slim and tall. Smart, intelligent, educated. A bit hesitant. Trusting, and can be fooled. He takes care of 60–65 years mom who considers herself a young and beautiful woman of 35 years (in the penultimate book, she marries a rich tycoon who likes her strange behavior and this duty devolved upon them). Nicoletta is a little bit unbalanced, screaming for her - the need of the body, like a habit to call his son "Wawa" and trying to marry off his on some questionable lady. Podushkin - an inveterate bachelor. He was not lucky with women, with none of them, he could not marry (though small intrigues enough and usually it suits him). Some consider poor Ivan Pavlovich a gay, but he is not (almost in every book he meets a woman or tries to seduce one of his skeletons in the closet - the memory of the red Riga prostitute, which he and a friend " captured "hard cured syphilis). Other (as it is not a spender and intellectual) believe him to be redneck and boring, although almost everyone uses Ivan Pavlovich.He has got friendly relations with Major MIA Max Voronov. As a result life made him the head of the traveling circus. But in the book "Laughter and sin of Ivan Tsarevich," we can see - Ivan Pavlovich returned to its owner and is ready to fulfill her every wish again. But it is a cruel hoax that rigged Eleanor.

Tatiana Sergeeva is a dark-haired owner of a full figure, intelligent and well-read, graduated from the philological faculty of teacher training, the widow (in the recent past), worked as a teacher of Russian language and literature. Married to the former actor Aristarchus Babulkin (nicknamed Gri), an employee of the secret group along with Tanya. She has friendly relations with the colleague - inveterate hacker nicknamed Korobok (Box). Soon Tanya's husband leaves her going somewhere with Martha Karz. Tatiana`s life is not getting better, but in the book "Foie gras from an ax," she becomes the head of the operative group. In the book "A hippo`s dream come true" she decides to find her husband Gris, although earlier she did not take any attempts.

Stepanida Kozlova (born 1990) is the sixth book of Daria Series. Fourth year student of the Pedagogical Institute, studies the specialty "teacher of Russian language and literature" (probably a reference to Tatiana Sergeeva). Stepanida lives with her grandmother Isabella Konstantinovna (perhaps a reference to Dasha Vasilyeva), who has the nickname Belka (Squirrel). Stepanida's parents died in an expedition to Central Asia. Soon Stepanida leaves the institute and gets a job in a company "Buck" as a makeup model . Before the book "Tamer Medusa" she was in love with her boss, Roman Zvyagin, and was considered as a girlfriend of his stepson, who she thought just a friend. After the book "Tamer Medusa" she becomes free and looks for a guy of her dreams. Although the book "Predatory Scarlet Flower" she fell in love with Philip Korsakov, but in the book "Moony disappears at midnight" decides to forget him.

=== Scripts for TV series ===
"Dasha Vasileva. Lover of private investigation "(together with Victoria Evseeva)

"A lover of private investigation Dasha Vasileva - 2" (together with Victoria Evseeva)

"A lover of private investigation Dasha Vasileva - 3" (jointly with Victoria Evseeva)

"Evlampiya Romanov. The investigation leads amateur "(together with Victoria Evseeva)

"Evlampiya Romanov. The investigation leads amateur - 2 "(together with Victoria Evseeva, Alice and Irina Michabeli Gelos)

"Viola. In the world of criminal passions "(together with Irina Pivovarova (Movie 1) and Catherine Shagalova (movies 2 and 3))

"Viola. In the world of criminal passions-2 "(with Irina Pivovarova and Catherine Shagalova)

"Ivan Podushkin. Gentleman Detective "(Movie 1 - together with Victoria Evseeva, movies 2 and 3 - Anna and Natalia Pavlovskaya Anosova; Season 2 - with Alexei Vinokourov and Victoria Evseeva)

=== Scripts for radio series ===
"Miracles in a saucepan"

== Awards ==
Winner of the "Writer of the Year" in 2001, 2002, 2003.

Winner of the "Bestseller of the Year" (established by the newspaper "Book Review") in 2002, 2003.

Winner of the trading house "Biblio-Globus" in the nomination "Author of the Year" and "Name of the Year" in 2002.

The winner of the annual open competition "Book of the Year" (for the Press Ministry, Broadcasting and Russian mass media) in the nomination "Bestseller of the Year" in 2003.

March 5, 2003, was laid in honor of the star Daria Series on the literary stars Square in Moscow on Strastnoy Boulevard.

24 June 2005 Darya Dontsova was awarded the Order of Peter the Great public 1st class with ribbon for his great personal contribution and outstanding achievements in literature. (Note: Darya Dontsova be awarded the Order of Peter the Great, for outstanding achievements in the field of literature. NEWSru.com (21 June 2005). Retrieved August 13, 2010. Retrieved March 3, 2012.)

from 2006 to 2015 inclusive in the polls VTsIOM Darya Dontsova recognized "Writer of the Year". (Note: VTsIOM: Russians chose Darya Dontsova writer of 2008 - for the books that are being treated for discouragement)

== The circulation and the number of published books ==
Dontsova published the highest number of books in Russia in 2015, with 117 titles and 1.97 million copies. At a far second was T. Ustinova who published 72 books with 891,000 copies circulated.

This is in comparison to 2012, when Dontsova published 129 titles, with 3.73 million copies sold.

Allegations have been made that books published under the name Darya Dontsova have been written not only by Dontsova herself, but a whole team of writers. This is due to the fact that just over 180 titles were issued throughout 15 years under the name of creativity Darya Dontsova. It is believed to be hard to write such an immense number of books for only one person.

In 2008, 2010 and 2011, Dontsova was accused of plagiarism.

== Sources ==
- Myaleshka TA Product placement in works of Darya Series: // formula for success Cult Products: The phenomenon of popular literature in modern Russia: Collection of scientific articles / IL Savkina, MA Chernyak. - SPb .: SPGUTD, 2009. - P. 100-105. - 336 with. - 1000 copies. - ISBN 978-5-7937-0239-3.
