= Russian State Library =

National public library in Moscow, Russia

- Российская государственная библиотека

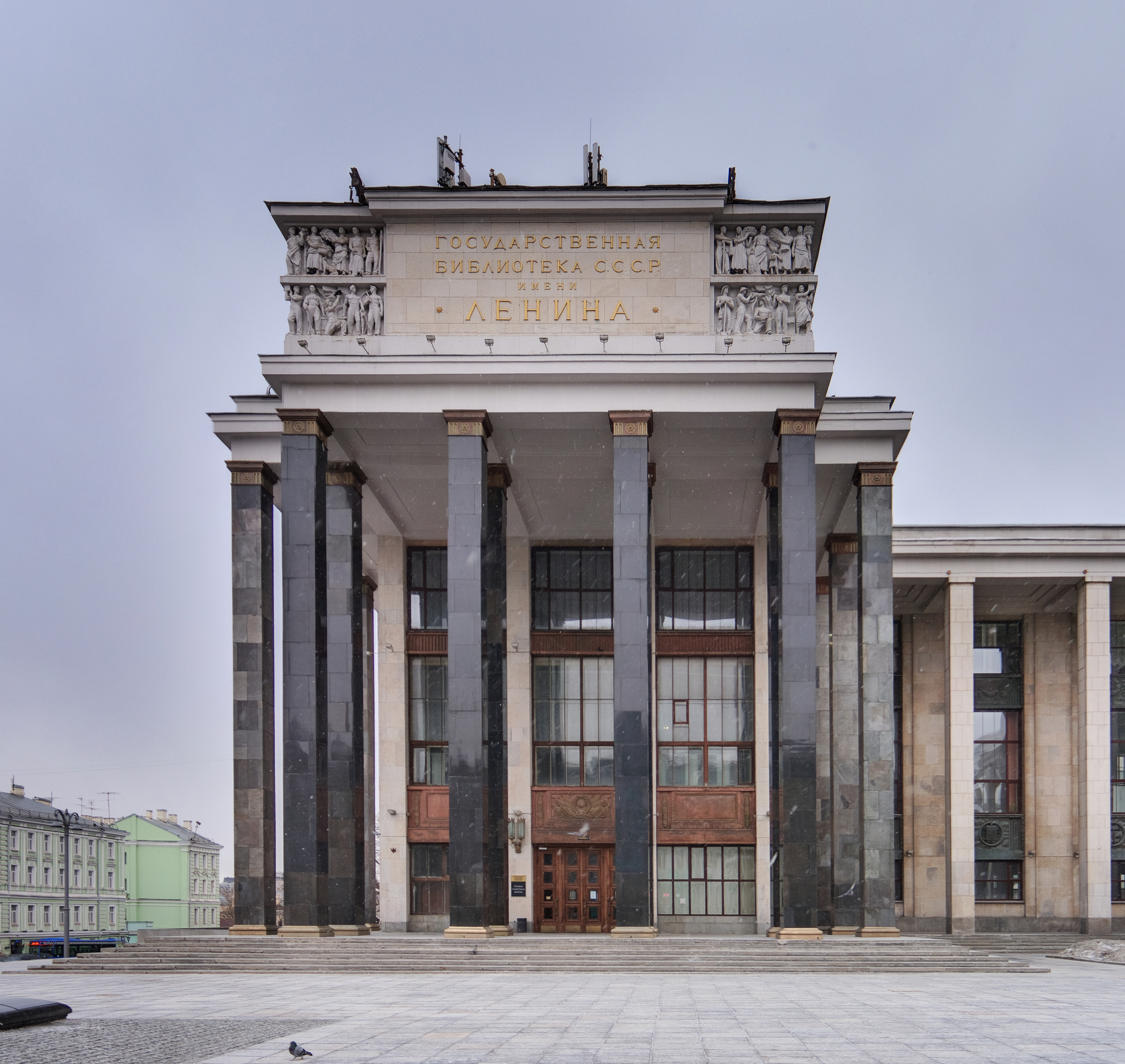
- Main building of the library. The façade still retains the Soviet-era name "Lenin State Library of the USSR"
- Location: Moscow, Russia
- Type: National library
- Established: 1862 (164 years ago)
- Branches: 3

Collection
- Items collected: Books, journals, newspapers, magazines, sound and music recordings, patents, databases, maps, stamps, prints, drawings and manuscripts
- Size: 47.7 million (2020)
- Criteria for collection: All publications published in Russia, all Russian-language publications published abroad, all foreign-language publications about Russia and other materials
- Legal deposit: Yes, since 1922

Access and use
- Access requirements: Users must be at least 14 years old and present a valid passport or ID card.
- Circulation: 1.116 million (2019)
- Members: 387,000 (2019)

Other information
- Budget: 2.4 billion ₽ (2019)
- Director: Vadim Duda
- Employees: 1,699 (2019)
- Website: rsl.ru

The Russian State Library (Russian: Российская государственная библиотека, romanized: Rossiyskaya gosudarstvennaya biblioteka) is one of the three national libraries of Russia, located in Moscow. It is the largest library in the country, second largest in Europe and one of the largest in the world. Its holdings crossed over 47 million units in 2017. It is a federal library (Note: The nine libraries with federal status have included the All-Russia State Library for Foreign Literature, the Russian Children's Library, the Young Adults' Library, the Russian State Library for the Blind among others) overseen by the Ministry of Culture, including being under its fiscal jurisdiction.

Its foundation lay in the opening of the Moscow Public Museum and Rumyantsev Museum in Moscow in 1862. This museum evolved from a number of collections, most notably Count Nikolay Rumyantsev's (Note: Also spelt Rumiantsev) library and historical collection. It was renamed after Lenin in 1924, popularly known as the Lenin Library or Leninka, and its current name was adopted in 1992.

The library has several buildings of varying architectural styles. In 2012 the library had over 275 km of shelves, including over 17 million books and serial volumes, 13 million magazines, 370 thousand music scores and sound records, 150,000 maps and others. There are items in 247 languages of the world, the foreign part representing about 29 percent of the entire collection. In 2017 holdings covered over 360 languages.

== History ==
=== Rumyantsev library ===
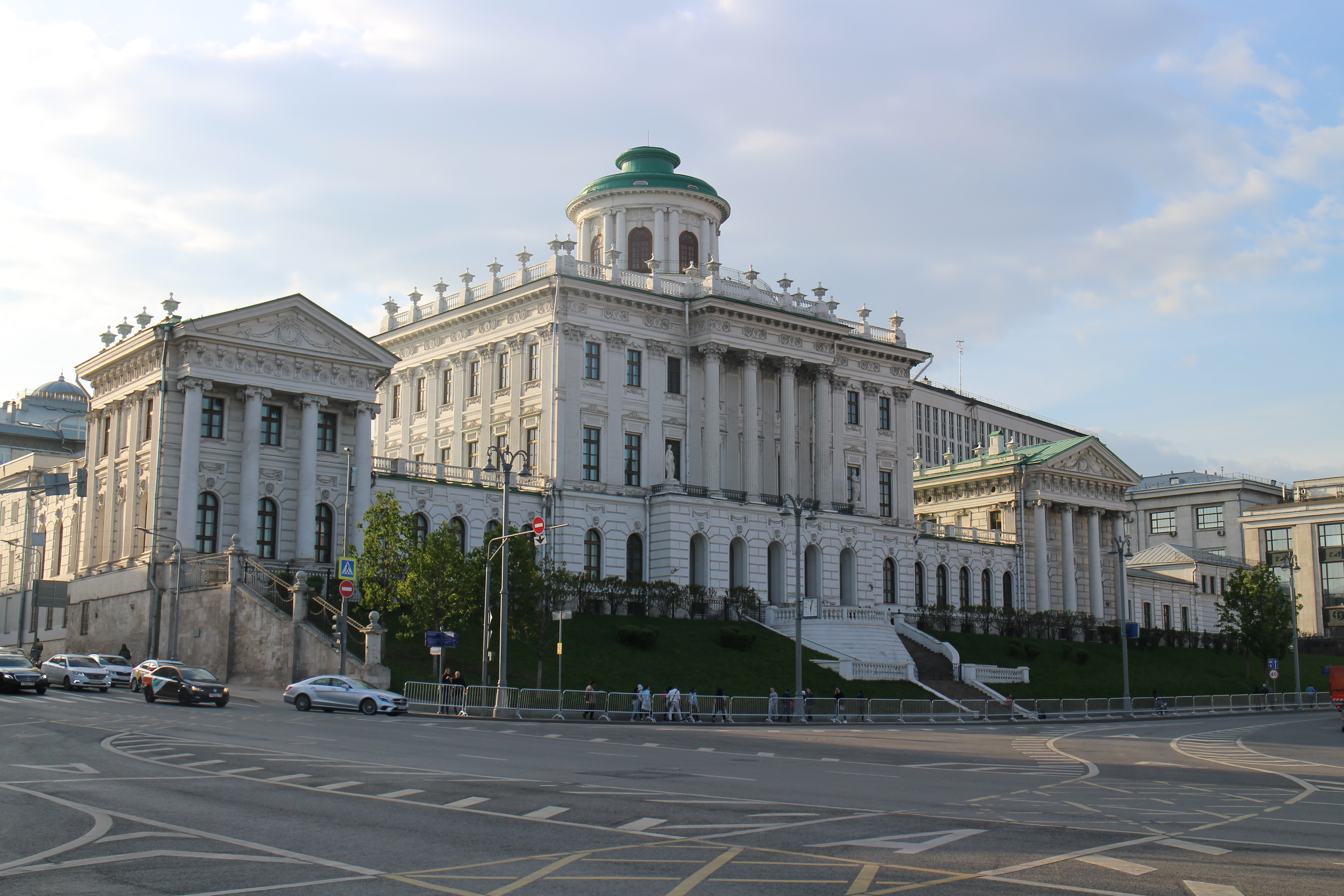
Pashkov House, old building of the Russian State Library. On the far right visible are the newer structures.

The library was founded on 1 July 1862, as Moscow's first free public library and as a part of the Moscow Public Museum and Rumyantsev Museum, or in short the Rumyantsev library.

The Rumyantsev Museum part of the complex housed the historical collection of Count Nikolai Petrovich Rumyantsev, which had been given to the Russian people and transferred from St. Petersburg to Moscow. Its donation covered above all books and manuscripts as well as an extensive numismatic and an ethnographic collection. These, as well as approximately 200 paintings and more than 20,000 prints, which had been selected from the collection of the Hermitage Museum in St. Petersburg, could be seen in the Pashkov House (a palace, established between 1784 and 1787, in the proximity of the Kremlin). Tsar Alexander II of Russia donated the painting The Appearance of Christ Before the People by A. A. Ivanov for the opening of the museum.

The citizens of Moscow, deeply impressed by the count's altruistic donation, named the new museum after its founder and had the inscription "from count Rumyantsev for the good Enlightenment" carved above its entrance. In the subsequent years, the collection of the museum grew by numerous further donations of objects and money, so that the museum soon housed a yet more important collection of Western European paintings, an extensive antique collection and a large collection of icons. Indeed, the collection grew so much that soon the premises of the Pashkov House became insufficient, and a second building was built beside the museum shortly after the turn of the 20th century to house the paintings in particular.

=== Lenin Library ===
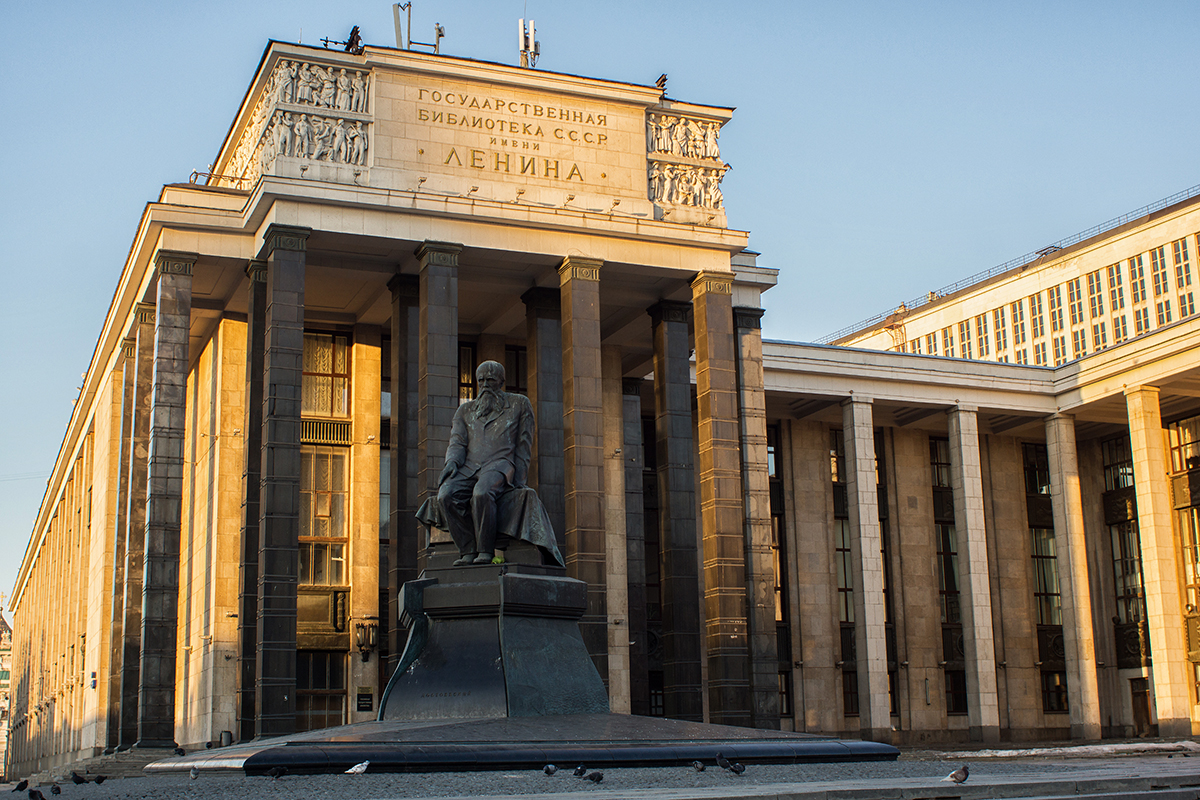
Main building of the library, in front is the Statue of Dostoevsky

After the October Revolution the contents again grew enormously, and again lack of space became an urgent problem. Acute financial problems also arose, for most of the money to finance the Museum flowed into the Pushkin Museum, which had only been finished a few years before and was assuming the Rumyantsev Museum's role. Therefore, it was decided in 1925 to dissolve the Rumyantsev Museum and to spread its collections over other museums and institutions in the country. Part of the collections, in particular the Western European art and antiques, were thus transferred to the Pushkin Museum. Pashkov House (at 3 Mokhovaya Street) was renamed the Old Building of the Russian State Library. The old state archive building on the corner of Mokhovaya and Vozdvizhenka Streets was razed and replaced by the new buildings. In 1925 the library was renamed the V. I. Lenin State Library of the USSR (Russian: Государственная библиотека СССР имени В. И. Ленина (ГБЛ), romanized: Gosudarstvennaja biblioteka SSSR imeni V. I. Lenina (GBL)). It is nicknamed the "Leninka".

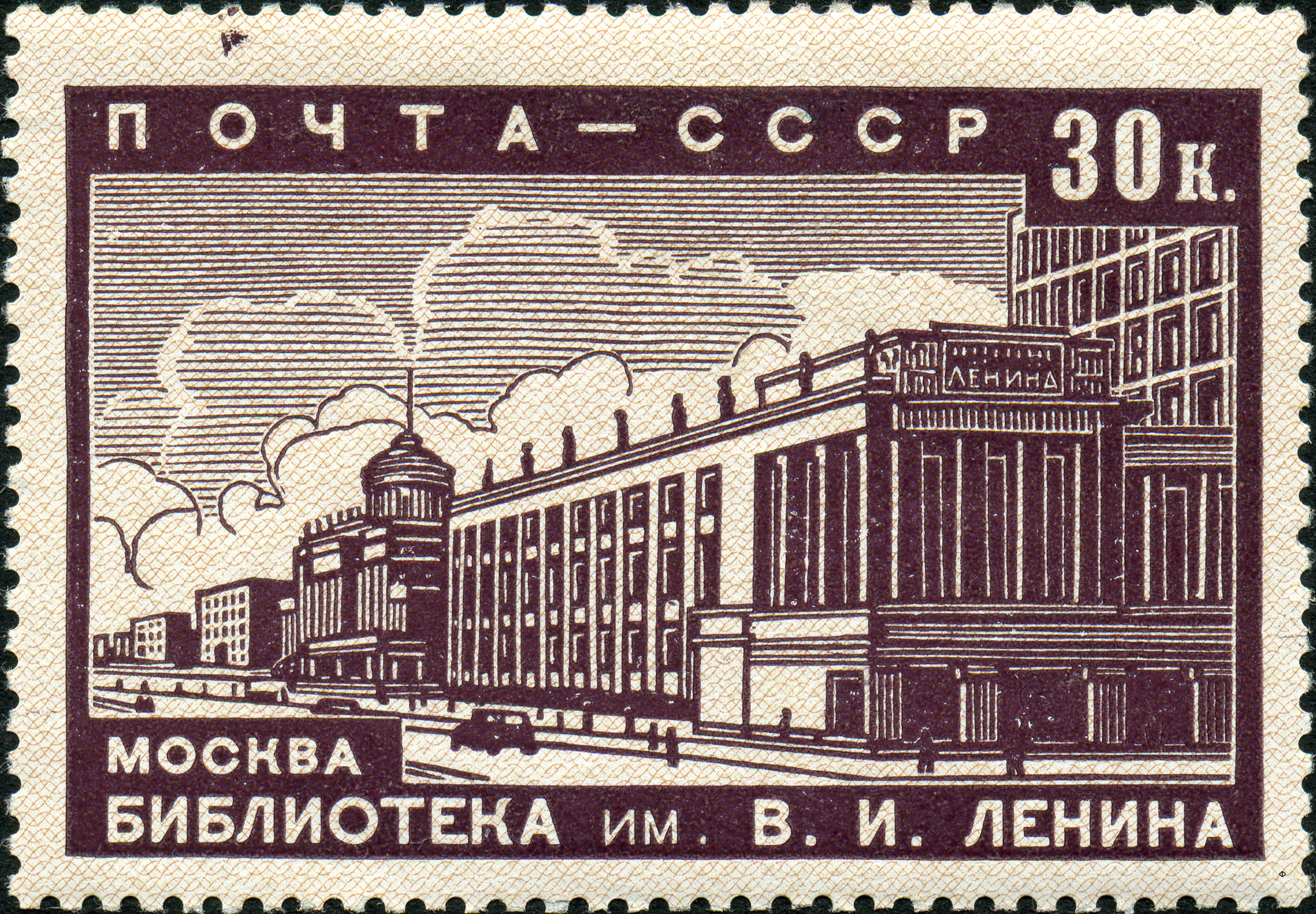
A 1939 postage stamp marking the completion of the first part of the new library building; it had a print run of 1600

Design of the new buildings of the Lenin Library was to be decided through a competition announced in December 1927. The competition had an open component while other architects were invited through invitation. While the first round was won by one team, another design by a team comprising Vladimir Shchuko and Vladimir Gelfreikh was chosen. This particular design was further modified to a large degree. Construction of the first stage was authorized in 1929 and commenced in 1930. Famous sculptors involved included Matvey Manizer. There are a number of statues on the roof. The first stage was largely complete in 1941. In the process, the building acquired the modernized neoclassicism exterior features of the Palace of Soviets (co-designed by Shchuko and Gelfreikh), departing from the stern modernism of the 1927–1928 drafts. The last component of Shchuko's plan, a 250-seat reading hall, was opened in 1945; further additions continued until 1960. During this period the library was identified as a "mass library". The Lenin Library was a central library, a national repository, a research institution in areas connected to libraries, and a center undertaking compilation of bibliographies. Its statues also designated it as an institution that "contributes to the development of communism in USSR". Its daily attendance was an estimated 5000 to 6000.

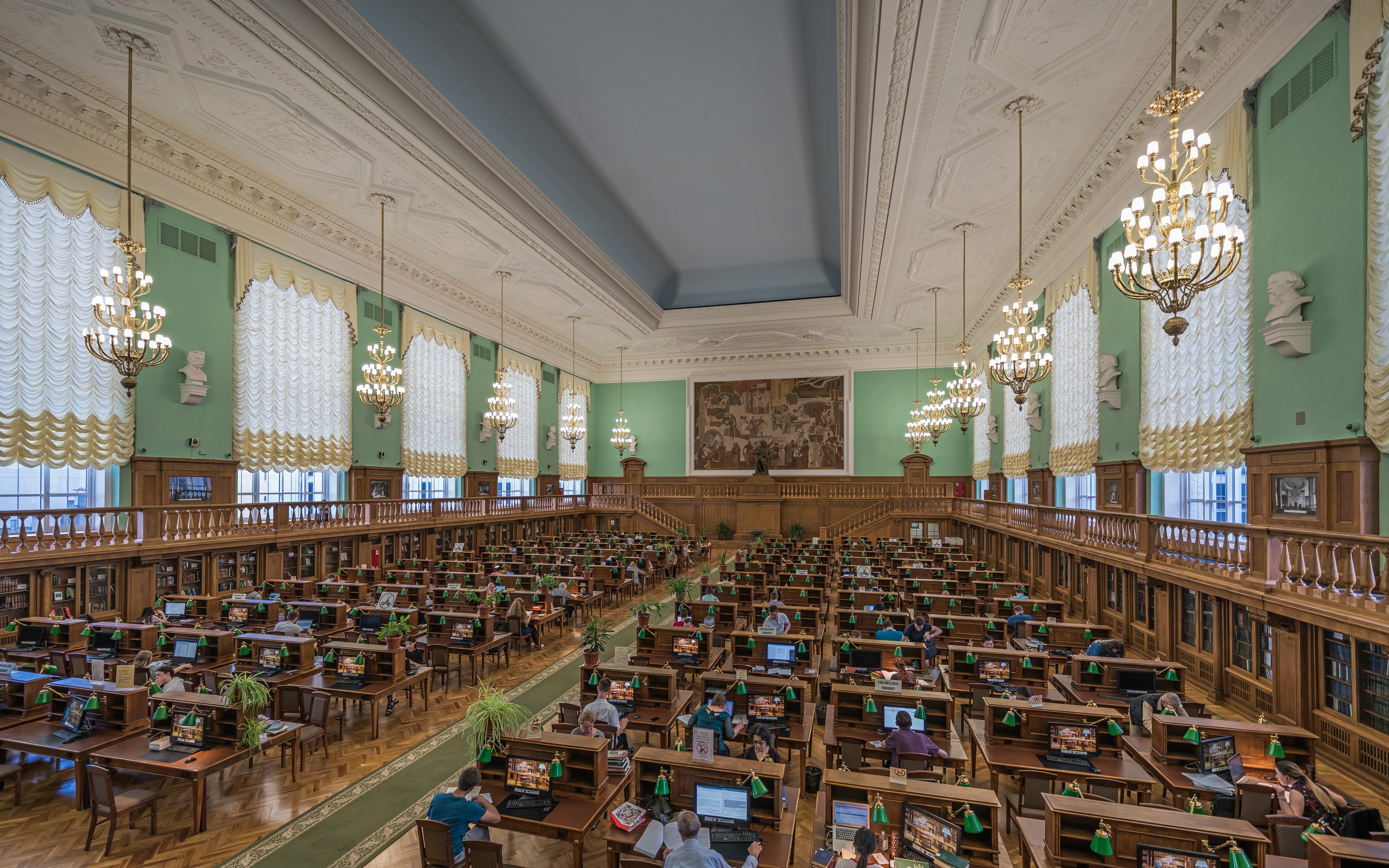
Reading room three, the largest. At the far end, a monument to Lenin. Busts along the walls.

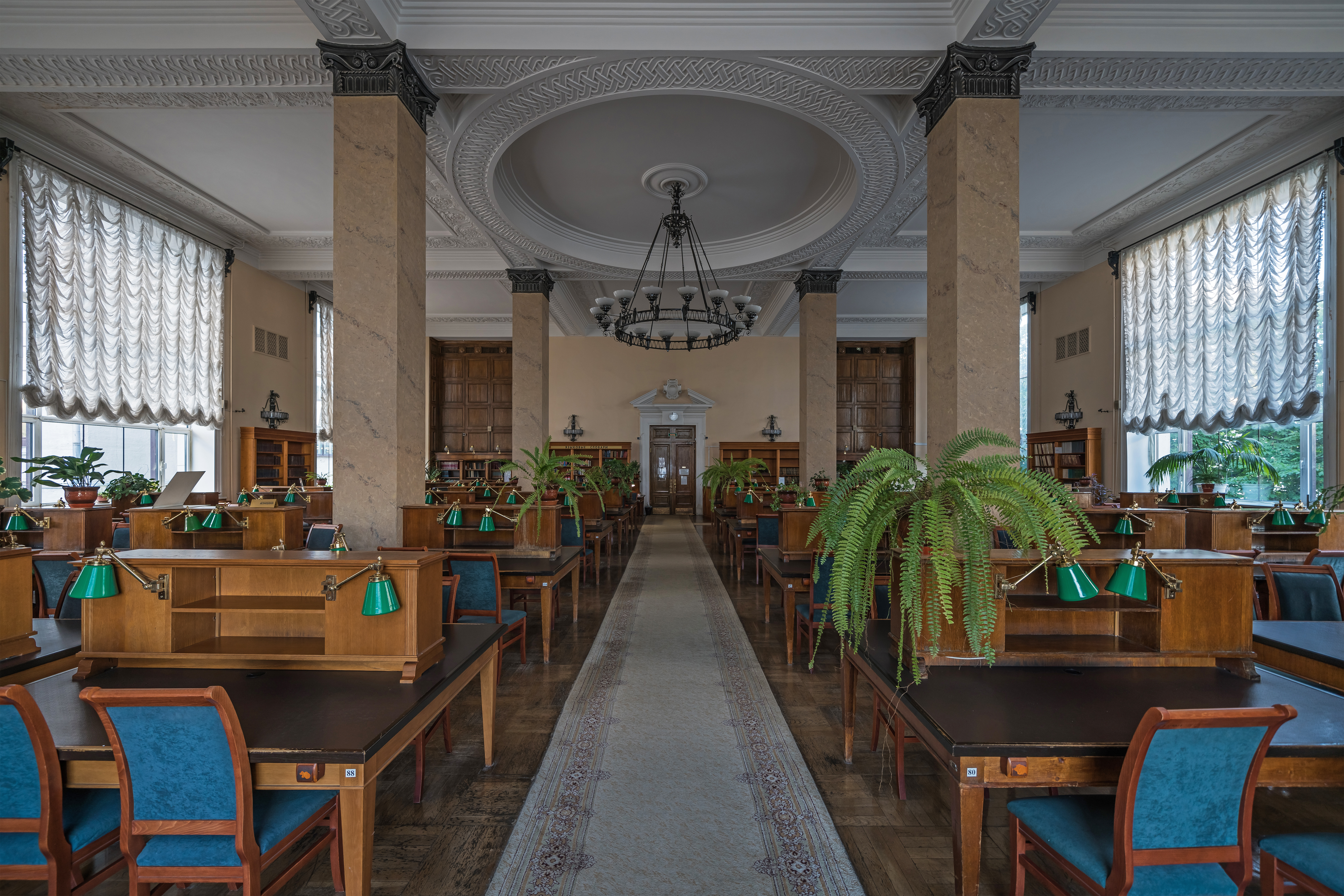
One of the smaller reading rooms

Copies of all printed items in the Soviet Union went to around ten institutions. Lenin Library received three copies, which the library could use for book exchange or distribution to other libraries. Lenin Library was one of two institutions that were permitted to take part in international book exchange until 1955. International books coming into the library during this period numbered to over 40,000, mainly science related. In the mid-1950s the library was conducting exchange with 60 countries. The library also loaned and borrowed books from domestic and foreign libraries.

Lenin Library, along with three other institutions, cooperated on a 1707–1957 catalog. In 1961, the library had twenty-two reading rooms; in 1976 the 22 reading rooms had a daily attendance of up to 8000. The Reference and Bibliography Department assisted readers in finding books. The library also assisted other libraries in book selections. These recommendations could reach to over three hundred pages. The library staff in 1961 consisted of 1750 librarians, 400 technical staff, and housekeeping and ancillary staff.

The holdings of the library were cleaned twice a year and observed throughout the year. Books showing problems were sent to the Department of Preservation. This department attended to 380,000 pages in a year. Microfilm preservation was assisted by the Special Institute of Cinematography. Until 1961 only Lenin Library was decently furnished to handle and copy adequate numbers of microfilm. Eugene Power commented that the library has a, "microfilm laboratory with twelve cameras, six of them of hybrid design utilizing an Eastman Kodak Microfile head, mast and lens; a copyboard and lights based on German design; and a book cradle of Russian design and manufacture".

In 1968 the building reached its capacity, and the library launched construction of a new depository in Khimki, earmarked for storing newspapers, scientific works and low-demand books from the main storage areas. The first stage of Khimki library was complete in 1975. Between 1922 and 1991 at least one copy of every book published in the USSR was deposited with the library, a practice which continues in a similar method today, with the library designated by law as a legal deposit library.

=== Russian State Library ===
In 1992, the library was renamed the Russian State Library by president Boris Yeltsin. It's legal mandate as a national library is under the federal law "On Librarianship/On Library Affairs" passed in 1994. The national role of the library entails that it is a depository for state documents, for foreign documents, a library for the armed forces, and a hub of an inter-library system. The Russian State Library, even before it officially became a national library, had a certain degree of cooperation with the earlier version of the National Library of Russia, the M.Y. Saltykov-Shchedrin State Public Library of the Russian Soviet Federative Socialist Republic, functioning as a national library since 1795. Once Russian State Library also became a national library, the two national libraries laid out a cooperation framework in 1996 with regard to functions such as storage of legal deposits and addressing duplication.

Reading rooms of the Leninka were organized by topic and format. Readers were required to have a suitable educational background. The elite as well as scholars used these. Under the national project 'Culture', the Russian State Library provides procedural assistance to developing libraries across the country. The library has also undertaken identification and documentation of "trophy" items in its holdings. A renovation of Pashkov House was completed in 2007. One of the main exhibition sites in recent times is the Ivanovo Hall. A permanent exhibit exists in the form of a book museum. The library holds events; for example in May 2019, Noize MC gave a lecture in the largest reading room and this was followed by other rap artists performing in front of the Marble Staircase at the entrance of the library.

In 2021, the library was given the duties of the Russian Book Chamber (the now-former bibliographic agency of Russia) as a part of a consolidation and digitization effort.

== Holdings ==
The library originates from the personal library and historical collection of Count Nikolai Petrovich Rumyantsev. At the time of his death in 1826 it consisted of around 28,000–29,000 books. By 1899 the library of the Moscow Public and Rumyantsev Museum had grown to half-a-million volumes and in the next two decades would go on to cross 1 million volumes. The collection was significantly expanded through acquisitions and expropriation. In 1951 the Lenin Library had the largest collection of books in the world, it would remain the largest till at least 1973. In 1959 the collections of the Lenin Library crossed 20 million. In 1961, rare publications numbered 250,000. Manuscripts from the 11th–15th centuries numbered 30,000. Historical artifacts numbered 600,000. In the Lenin Library a book was defined as a publication with five or more pages, along with certain other criteria. In 1994 holdings crossed 40 million.

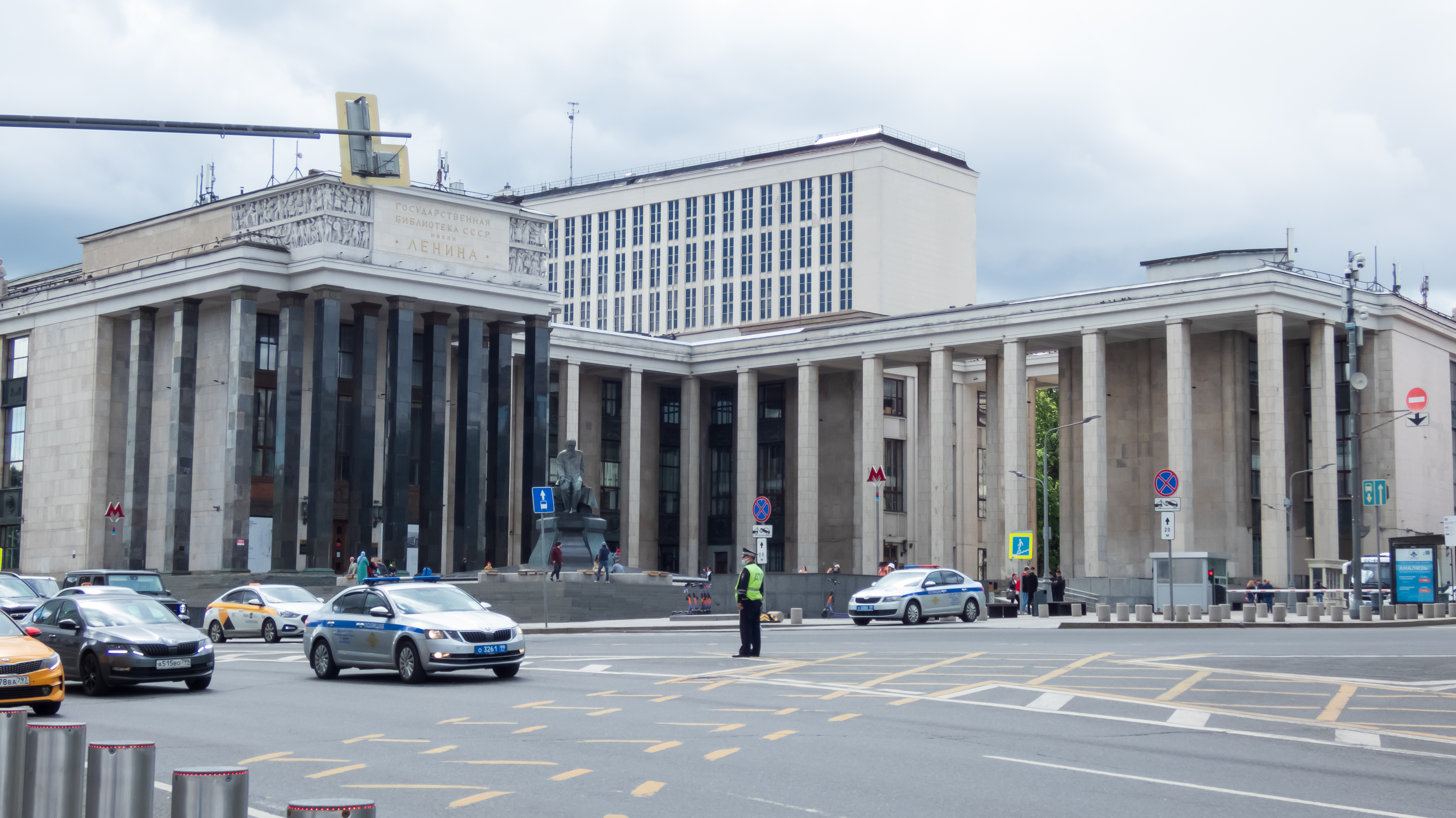
The 19-story depository can be seen in the background, from Mokhovaya Street

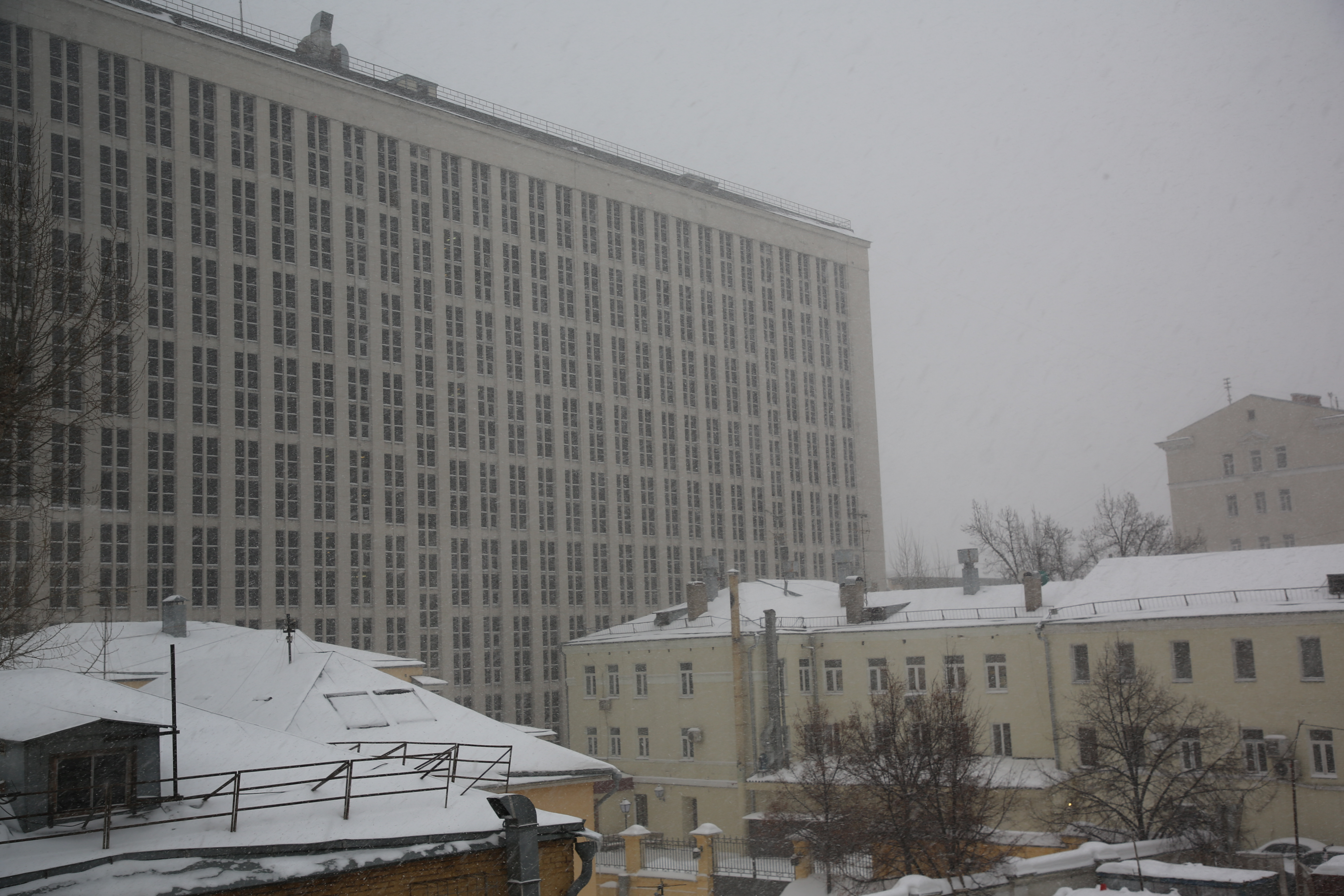
The depository as seen from Starovagankovsky Lane side, near Shchusev Museum of Architecture

In 2000, holdings were 42 million items, consisting of books in living and dead languages. In that year the library received over 357,000 thousand copies of documents including foreign items. The holdings include a manuscript collection dating to the sixth century, family and estate archives including those of industrial and land-owning dynasties, personal papers of notable individuals from across the spectrum, and an autograph collection. The collection includes a Gutenberg Bible, illuminated manuscripts such as the 14th-century Psalter of Ivan the Terrible, Ivan Fedorov's "Apostles" (1564), and first editions of works by Nicolaus Copernicus, Charles Darwin and Isaac Newton. United Nations documents number to over 250,000. Holdings include maps, military literature, music and sound collections, oriental literature, newspapers and dissertations. In 2017 holdings crossed 47 million in 360 languages.

The Electronic Library department was created in the mid-1990s. Its first collection included 900,000 theses in Russian. The United Nations' Memory of the World Programme saw involvement with digitized items such as the Arkhangelsk Gospel (year 1092) and old Russian newspapers, maps, posters. Digitization of the initial collection of the Electronic Library was also expanded through projects with the Library of Congress, United States, and the European Union. With regard to music, digitization of old printed music allows for its preservation and easier distribution and access to those interested including researchers; the digitization attempts to capture the artistic nature as well, including the art on covers and markings by owners and so on. The Digital Dissertation Library was initiated in 2003. As its size grew with yearly additions, the number of virtual reading rooms of the Digital Dissertation Library also increased, including those in other countries.

== Research and publications ==
The library is an institution of research in library science and related areas. The Lenin Library, including its Bureau of Library Guidance and Research, had a numerous publications– collections, manuals and catalogues, book promotions, bibliographic lists, works on socio-political topics, technical publications, and art related publications. Bibliotekovedenie (Russian Journal of Library Science) was founded in 1952 and received its current name in 1993. The journal Observatory of Culture was founded in 2004. The journal Vostochnaya Kollektsiya (Oriental Collection) was published between 1999 and 2015, during this period 61 issues were published with over 1200 articles. Pashkov Dom Publishing was established in 1998 and functions as a publisher for the library.

Books about the library include S.V. Zhitomirskaia's Prosto zhizn and V. V. Fedorov's (ed.) Rossiiskaia gosudarstvennaia biblioteka.

== Gallery ==
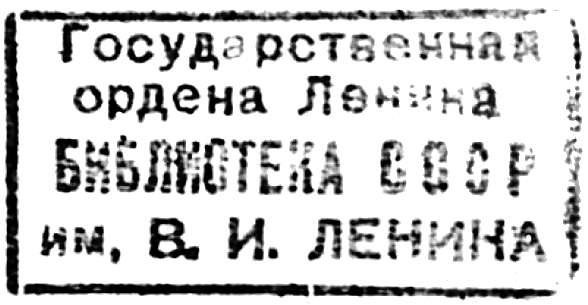
Russian State Library stamp (Soviet times)

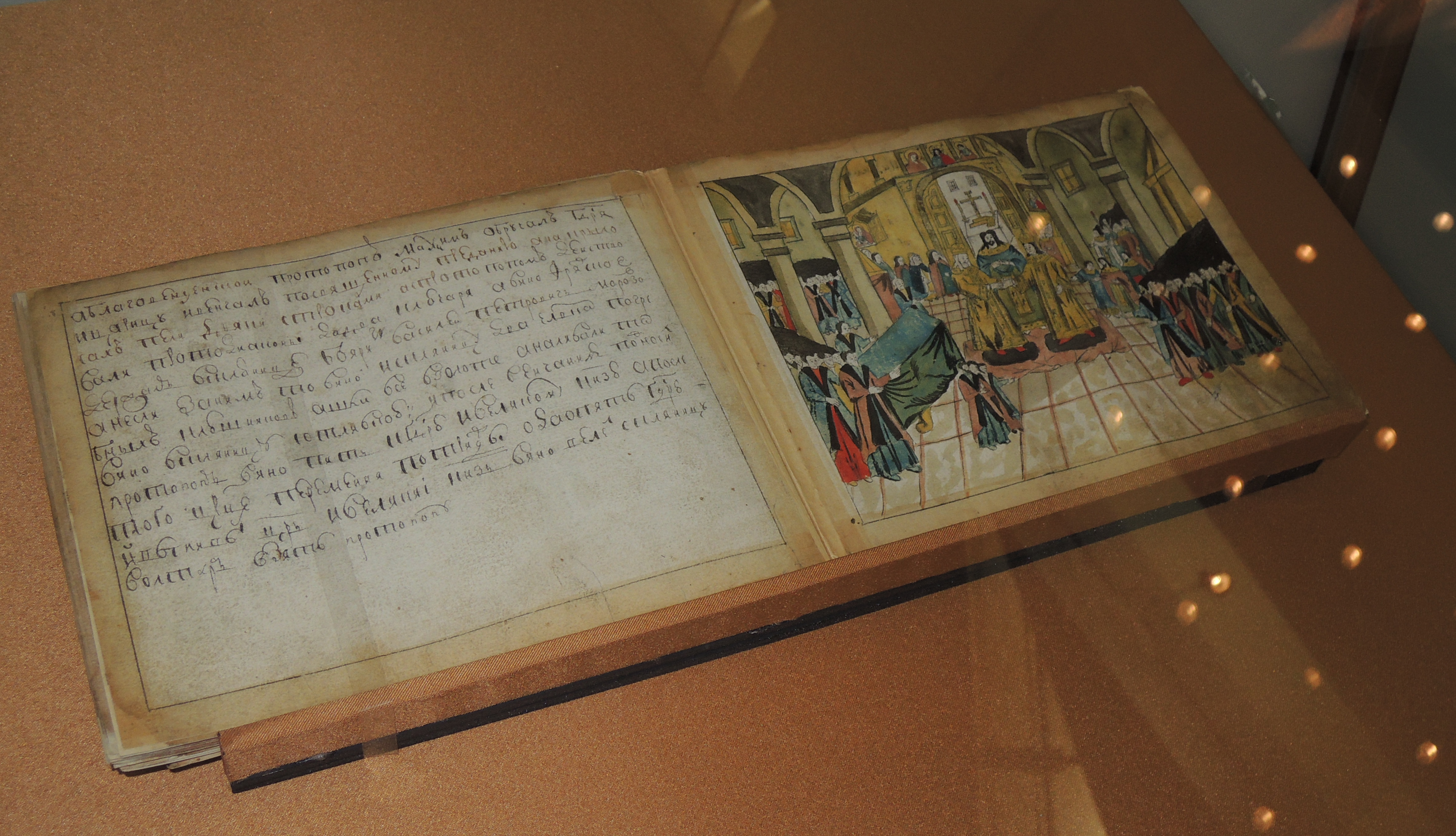
The wedding of tsar Michael I

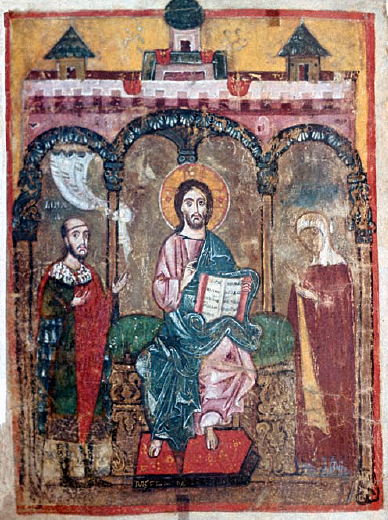
Tver manuscript of George Hamartolus

== See also ==
- The two other national libraries of Russia:
  - National Library of Russia
  - Boris Yeltsin Presidential Library
- Russian Book Chamber
- List of libraries in Russia
