= Boarding School for Girls of the Ministry of Defense of Russia =

Russian cadet school for girls

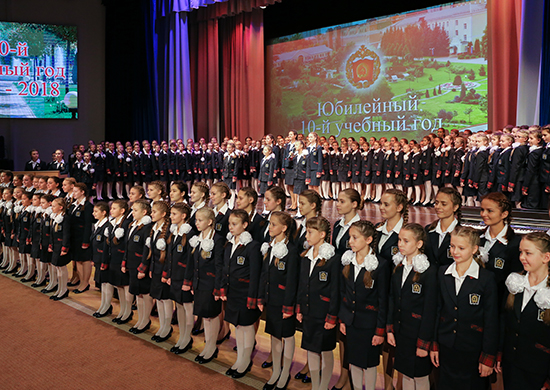
The school on Knowledge Day in September 2017.

The Girls Boarding School of the Ministry of Defence of the Russian Federation (Note: Russian: Школа-интернат для девочек Министерства обороны Российской Федерации, romanized: Shkola-internat dlya devochek Ministerstva oborony Rossiyskoy Federatsii) (GBS-MDRF) is a Russian educational institution for girls operated by Ministry of Defense of Russia. The school is a pre-university educational institution of the Cadet Corps (Russia).

== Overview ==
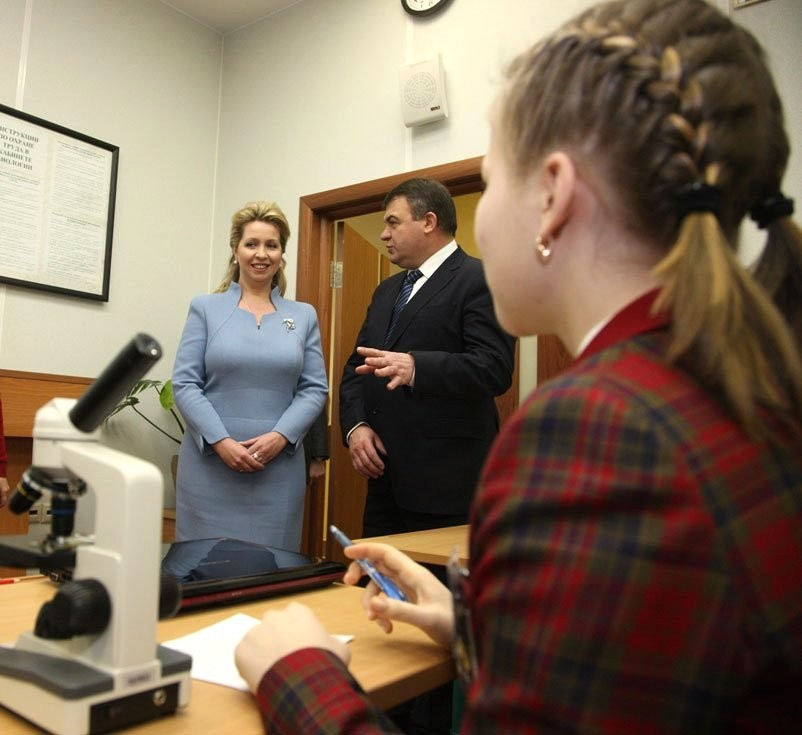
Russian First Lady Svetlana Medvedeva with Defense Minister Anatoliy Serdyukov at the school in 2008.

The school was established in 2008 as part of the Strategy for the Social Development of the Armed Forces of the Russian Federation. The daughters of servicemen are trained in the boarding school from 5th to 11th grade, annually accepting 120 girls who are of at least 11 years of age. At the end of the school year, many girls have the choice of attending military and civilian universities in Russia and abroad. At the moment, more than 50 clubs (choreographic, vocal, musical, sports, theatrical, cooking, journalism, drummers group, and others) are active in the school. After classes on weekdays, as well as on weekends and holidays, the girls together with their educators make trips to the city, visiting theaters, museums, exhibitions and parks in Moscow. The clothes that cadets wear are sewn by famed Russian stylists such as Kira Plastinina and Valentin Yudashkin, while physical education exercises are developed by the Cosmonaut Preparation Center.

== Gallery of the Boarding School ==
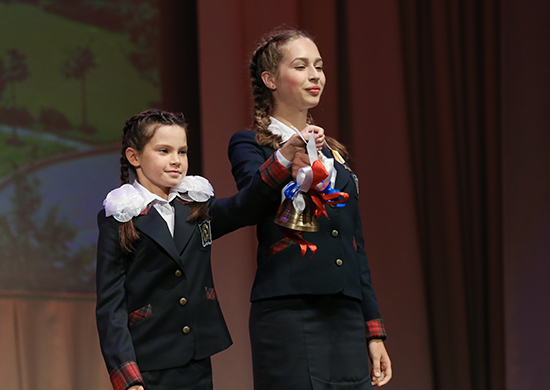

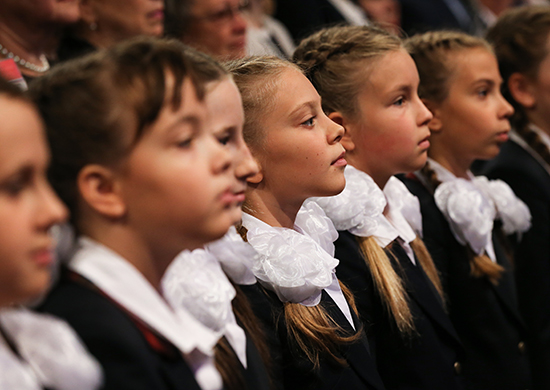

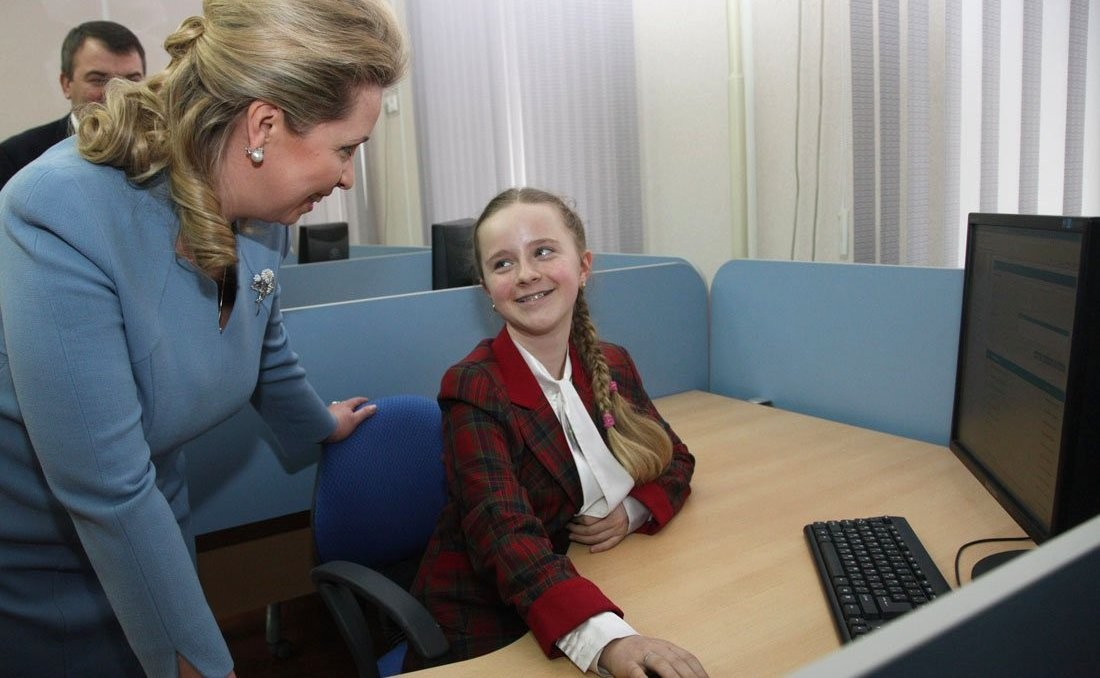

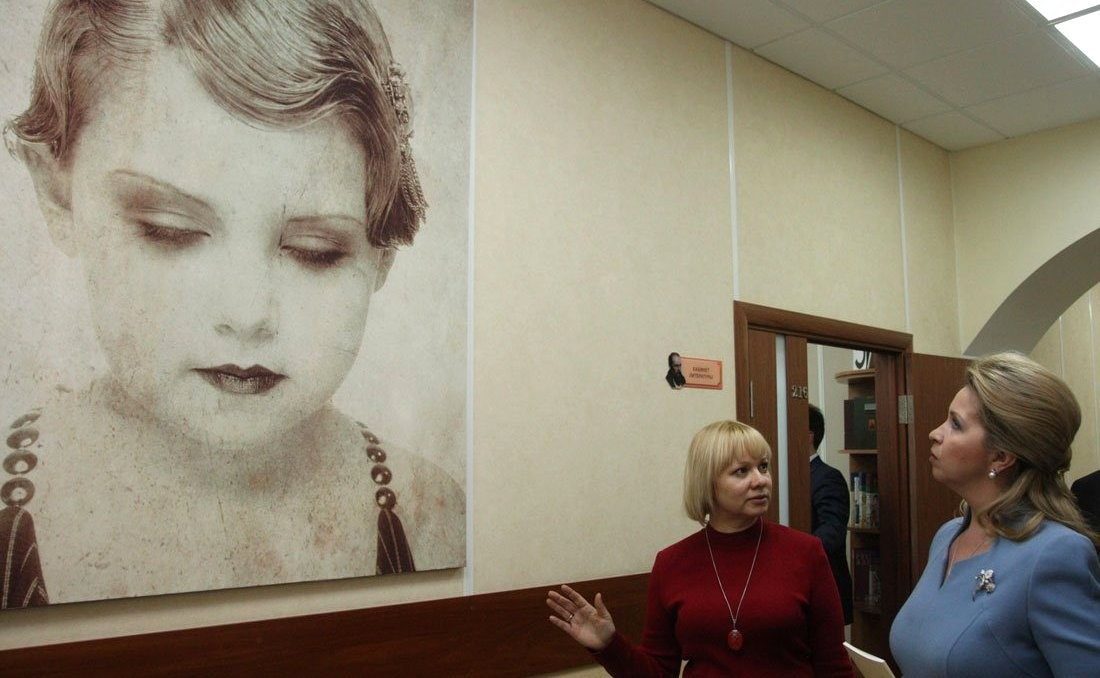

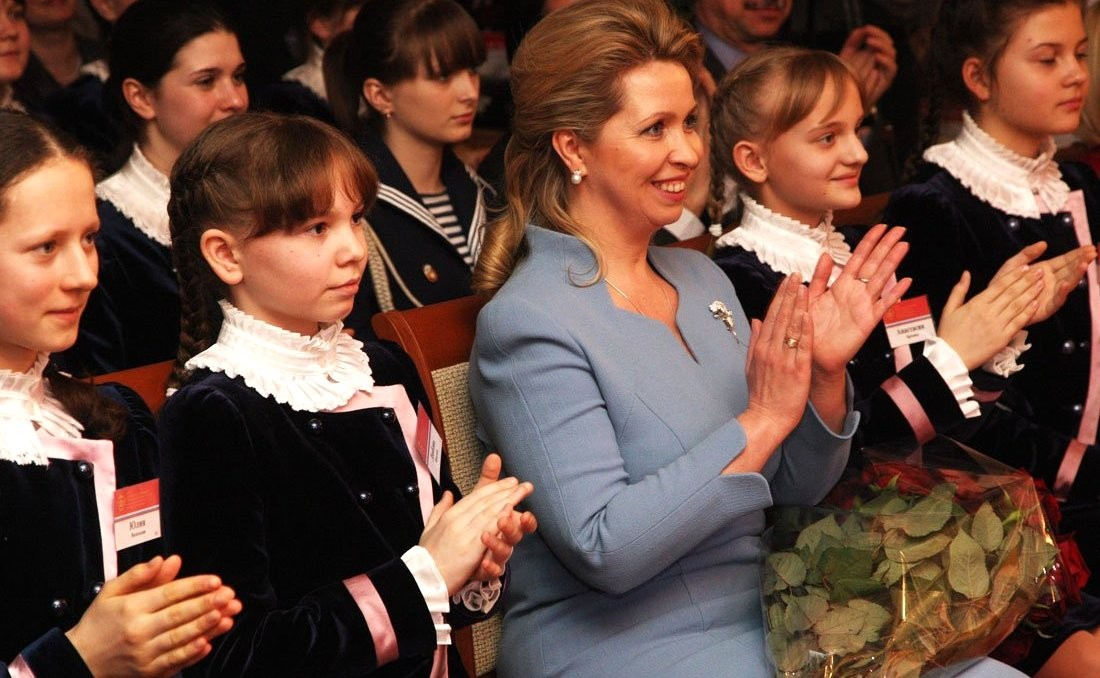

== See also ==
- Military academies in Russia
- Ministry of Defence (Russia)
- Boarding school
- Cadet Corps (Russia)
