= Vostochnaya Kollektsiya =

Oriental Collection's cover

Vostochnaya Kollektsiya (Oriental Collection) is a quarterly scientific and popular illustrated magazine published by the Russian State Library. The magazine was published between 1999 and 2015.

== History and profile ==
The first issue was published in 1999. In 2000 there were no issues. Since 2001 it has been regularly published with a revised concept. The magazine is subtitled "The magazine for all who are interested in the East" and it covers topics related to cultural, historical and religious aspects of Russia, Asia, and North Africa. It publishes articles and essays, archival documents, sketches of travels, reviews of Internet resources, and introduces museums’ collections, books collections and selected publications, including those stored in the Russian State Library.

Permanent sections are: Impressions, Letters, A Country of the East, Orientnet. There are abstracts in English.

The editor in chief is Aleksandr Aleksandrovich Poleshchuk
