= Russian Book Chamber =

Former national bibliographic agency of Russia

The Russian Book Chamber is the former national bibliographic agency of Russia. It served as the central institution for legal deposit, compilation of the national bibliography, publishing statistics, archival storage of printed works, and administration of international standard book numbers (ISBN) in addition to ISMN, and ISSN. Established in May, 1917, the Chamber's duties were transferred to the Russian State Library on 26 January 2021. It was the world's first state institution dedicated specifically to the bibliographic and statistical registration of printed publications.

The Chamber was responsible for processing mandatory copies of all publications produced in Russia, issuing a series of state bibliographic indices known as Letopisi (Chronicles), maintaining the State Archive of the Press of Russia, and providing data on the national book industry. Its work supported libraries, publishers, researcher, and the broader book ecosystem. Following reorganization, these responsibilities continue today under the Russian State Library, which now houses the former Book Chamber's collections and operations.

== History ==
The Russian Book Chamber was established on 10 May, 1917 in Petrograd by a decree of the Provisional Government of Russia titled "On Institutions for Press Affairs." The initiative came from members of the Russian Bibliological Society to reorganize the system of mandatory copies as the foundation for national biliographic and statistical accounting. Prominent scholars including A. A. Shakhmatov, S. F. Oldenburg, and S. A. Vengerov (the first director) were instrumental in its creation. It was the first governmental body worldwide created exclusively for the registration of printed works.

In 1920, following decrees by the Council of People's Commissars and the People's Commissariat of Education, it was relocated to Moscow and reorganized as the Russian Central Book Chamber. In 1936, a resolution of the Presidium of the Central Executive Committee of the USSR transformed it into the All-Union Book Chamber, which coordinated bibliographic work across the Soviet republics. After the dissolution of the Soviet Union, it was renamed the Russian Book Chamber in 1992.

In 2013, it was restructured as a branch of the Information Telegraph Agency of Russia (ITAR-TASS). On 26 January, 2021, Prime Minister Mikhail Mishustin signed Government Order No. 150-r transferring its duties to the Russian State Library. The merger aimed to eliminate duplication of cataloging and storage, streamline the legal deposit system (including digital transformation), reduce costs for publishers, and create the world's largest national collection (approximately 200 million documents). Elena Nogina (Director General of the Book Chamber) and Vadim Duda (Director General of the RSL) emphasized improved compliance with deposit laws and better support for the national book industry. The Book Chamber's collections and operations were integrated into the RSL, where it continues to function as a specialized department.

The institution marked its 105th anniversary in 2022 with publications highlighting 105 years of state bibliography.

== Functions ==
The Chamber's core tasks, established from its founding, included bibliographic and statistical accounting of all printed (and later electronic) materials produced in Russia, issuance of state bibliographic indexes, formation and maintenance of the national print archive from mandatory copies and research in bibliography and book studies.

The Chamber's key responsibilities were:

• Legal deposit: Receiving, registering, and then distributing mandatory copies under Russian federal law (including the 1994/2002 laws on mandatory copies of documents). It acted as the primary recipient and distributor to major libraries.

• National bibliography: Compiling and publishing the Letopisi series, such as Book Chronicle (Книжная летопись, later Books of the Russian Federation), Chronicle of Journal Articles, Chronicle of Newspaper Articles, Chronicle of Dissertation Abstracts, Musical Notation Chronicle, Cartographic Chronicle, and others. These indexes covered books, periodicals, articles, reviews, maps, music, and more.

• Publishing statistics: Annual reports on the Russian book industry (e.g. Print of the Russian Federation).

• Standard numbering: National agency for ISBN, ISMN, and ISSN.

• Archival storage: Maintenance of the State Archive of the Press (tens of millions of items), with digitization initiatives.

• Research and publications: Research in book studies; publication of the journal Bibliography and Book Studies (formerly Bibliography).

It processed hundreds of thousands of editions annually and maintained extensive electronic databases. A 2012 analysis by K.M. Sukhorukov detailed its legal deposit framework, publishing statistics, and bibliographic indexes.

== Current status ==
Since the 2021 transfer, the Russian Book Chamber operates as an integrated unit within the Russian State Library while preserving its traditional functions. The consolidation supports digital accuracy, reduces redundancy, and enhances service to the Russian library network. The RSL now holds one of the world's larges combined collections.

== See also ==
• Russian State Library • Legal deposit • National bibliography • National Library of Russia
