= Musa Gareyev =

Soviet Bashkir aviator (1922–1987)

Musa Gaysinovich Gareyev
- Муса Ғайса улы Гәрәев
- Born: 9 June 1922; Ilyakshidy, Ufa Governorate, RSFSR located within present day Ilishevsky District
- Died: 17 September 1987 (aged 65); Ufa, Bashkir ASSR, RSFSR, Soviet Union
- Military career
- Allegiance: Soviet Union
- Branch: Soviet Air Force
- Service years: 1940–1964
- Rank: Colonel
- Units: 505th Assault Aviation Regiment; 504th Assault Aviation Regiment; 76th Guards Assault Aviation Regiment
- Conflicts: World War II
- Awards: Hero of the Soviet Union (twice)

Musa Gaysinovich Gareyev (Russian: Муса Гайсинович Гареев, Bashkir: Муса Ғайса улы Гәрәев, Musa Ğaysa ulı Gäräyev; 9 June 1922 – 17 September 1987) was a squadron commander in the 76th Guards Ground Attack Aviation Regiment of the Soviet Air Forces during the Second World War. He was also the only Bashkir twice awarded the title Hero of the Soviet Union.

== Early life ==
Gareyev was born on 9 June 1922 to a Bashkir peasant family in the village of Ilyashidy. He and his family moved to the village of Tashchishma, and in 1937 he completed his seventh year of secondary education at a school in Bishkuraevo.

In 1940 he attended a technical school and studied at a local OSOAVIAKhIM aeroclub; after completing training at the aeroclub that same year he entered the Soviet military in December.

== World War II ==
Upon completing further training at the Engels Military Aviation School in June 1942 Gareyev was assigned to the 10th Reserve Aviation Regiment. Three months later in September he was deployed to the warfront as part of the 944th Attack Aviation Regiment. He served in that regiment until December, when he was transferred to the 505th Attack Aviation Regiment. Just a few weeks later in January he was again assigned to another regiment, the 504th Attack Aviation Regiment. In March 1943 that unit was renamed as the 74th Guards Attack Aviation Regiment, but he left the unit in April for the 76th Guards Attack Aviation Regiment, which he served in for the remainder of the war. Originally a flight commander, he rose up in the chain of command, and by the end of the war he was a squadron commander with the rank of Major, having completed an estimated 250 missions in the Il-2.

For doing completing 164 missions he was awarded his first gold star in February 1945, and he was awarded his second gold star for completing 207 missions in April 1945.

== Postwar ==
While still in the military, Gareyev became a deputy in the Supreme Soviet of the USSR, remaining in office from 1946 to 1958.

In 1946 he was placed in command of an aviation regiment based in Moscow, but was relieved of the position in 1948.

In 1950 he was promoted to the rank of lieutenant-colonel, and after graduating from the Frunze military academy in 1951 he was promoted to the rank of colonel in 1956.

After graduating from the Military Academy of the General Staff of the USSR in 1959 he was appointed as the deputy commander of the 2nd Special-Purpose Aviation Division, and in 1960 he became the deputy commander of the 10th Separate Aviation Brigade before he entered the reserve in May 1964.

As a civilian, he war chairman of the Bashkir DOSAAF Committee from 1965 to 1977.

He died of cancer on 17 September 1987 and was buried in the Ufa Victory Park.

== Awards and honors ==
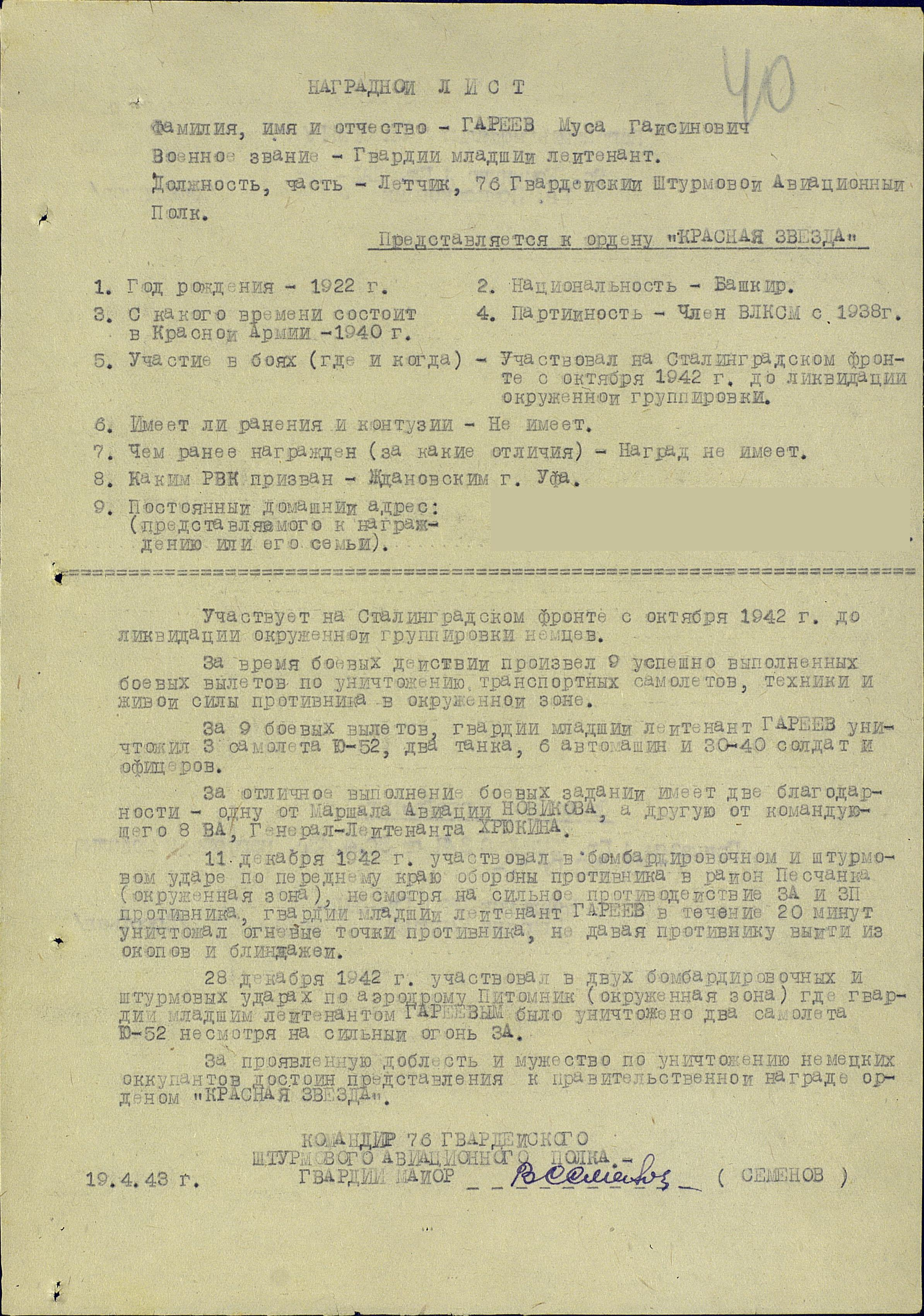
Award list of Musa Gareev

- Twice Hero of the Soviet Union (23 February 1945 and 19 April 1945)
- Order of Lenin (23 February 1945)
- Three Orders of the Red Banner (20 August 1943, 23 February 1944, and 2 November 1944)
- Order of Bogdan Khmelnitsky (2 March 1943)
- Order of Alexander Nevsky (14 July 1944)
- Two Orders of the Patriotic War 1st Class (2 April 1945 and 11 March 1985)
- Order of the Red Banner of Labour (31 August 1971)
- Three Orders of the Red Star (24 June 1943, 22 February 1955, and 30 December 1956)
- Medal "For Courage" (30 April 1943)
- campaign and jubilee medals
- honorary citizen of the city of Ufa
