= Moscow Suvorov Military School =

Military educational institution

- Московское суворовское военное училище
- Emblem of the School
- Motto: Life is for the Motherland, honor for no one!
- Type: military academy
- Established: 1944
- Rector: Lieutenant General Viktor Polyakov
- Location: Moscow, Russia; 55.879698003°N 37.66832357°E
- Language: Russian
- Building details
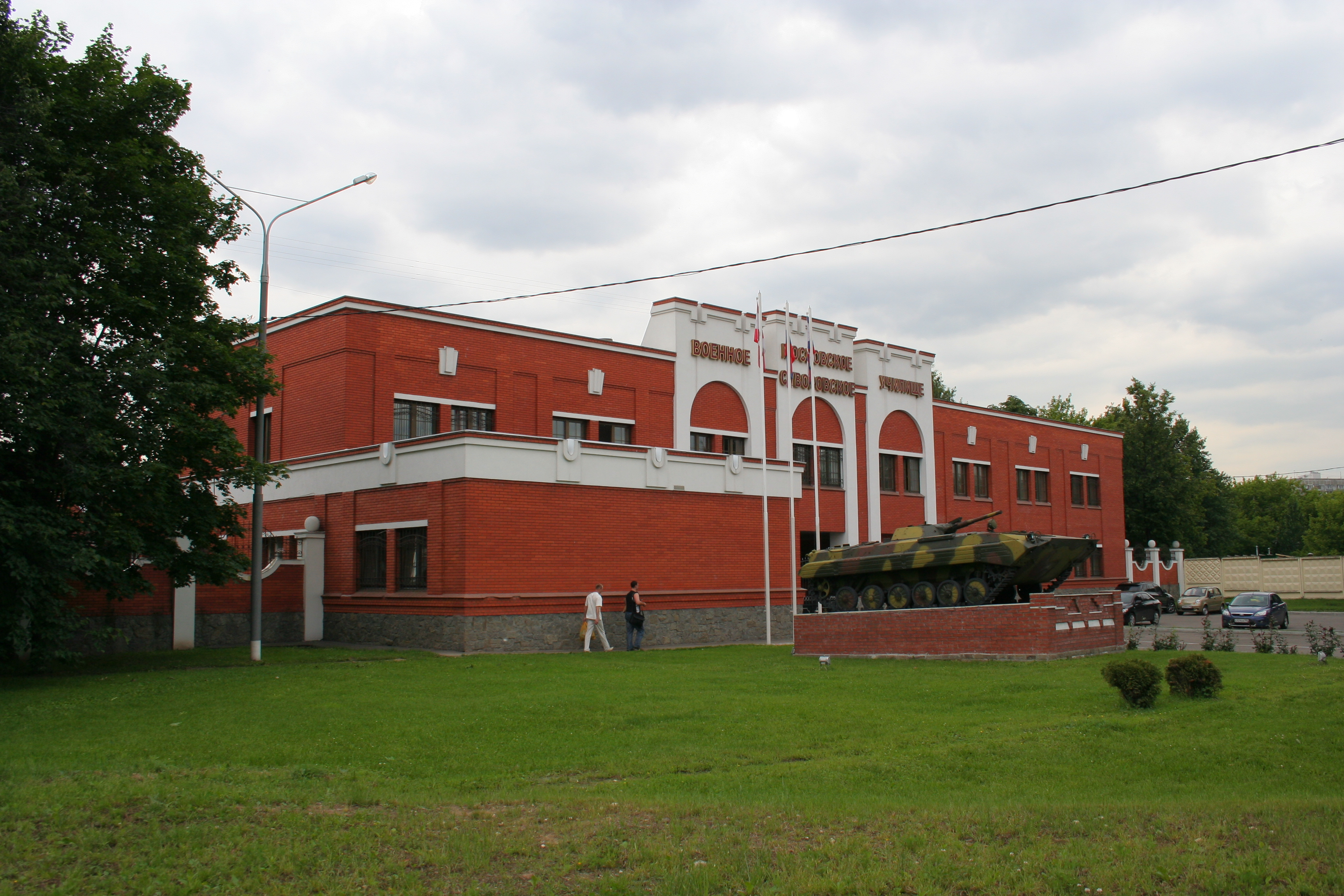

The Moscow Suvorov Military School (MsSVU) (Russian: Московское суворовское военное училище, romanized: Moskovskoye suvorovskoye voyennoye uchilishche) is a military educational institution of secondary education of the Ministry of Defense of Russia. It was the first of the Suvorov Military Schools founded in the Soviet Union. MsSVU was named after Russian military commander Alexander Suvorov (1730–1800).

== History ==
The Moscow Suvorov Military School was formed as the Gorky Suvorov Military School between 4 July 1944 and 1 October 1944. The Gorky Suvorov School was home to teachers and military officers in the Red Army. On 30 August 1956, the Gorky Suvorov Military School was relocated to Moscow. In 1964, the school switched to a three-year curriculum. They began to take boys after 8th grade at the age of 15–16 years. On 21 December 1991, the school was redeployed to Moscow.

== Location ==
In Moscow, it was originally located near the Fili metro station. In 1991, it was transferred to Winding Passage, Building 11 (Babushkinskaya), where it is located to this day. Since 2011, the graduation of Suvorovites has been carried out on Cathedral Square in the Moscow Kremlin. Opposite the school is the Moscow Border Institute of the FSB of the Russian Federation.

== Heads of the School ==
The following is a list of heads of the school since 1944:

- 1944-1950 - Major-General Karp Zheleznikov
- 1950-1953 - Major-General Guri Smirnov
- 1953-1956 - Major-General Boris Anisimov
- 1956-1961 - Major-General Leonid Vagin
- 1961-1963 - Colonel Grigory Muslanov
- 1963-1965 - Major-General Sergei Savchenko
- 1965-1973 - Major-General Vasily Fedotov
- 1973-1982 - Major-General Pyotr Kivolya
- 1982-1991 - Major-General Ivan Sumenkov
- 1991-1998 - Major-General Nikolay Kornilov
- 1998-2006 - Major-General Vyacheslav Roshchin
- 2006-2009 - Major-General Andrei Nechaev
- 2010-2011 - Colonel Alexander Tomashov
- 2011-2013 - Alexander Aglushevich
- 2013-2017 - Major-General Alexander Kasyanov
- 2017–Present - Lieutenant-General Victor Polyakov

== Alumni ==
During its existence, the school had conducted 63 graduations. Many of its pupils eventually became the Heroes of the Soviet Union and veterans of the Soviet-Afghan War. Notable alumni have included:

- Igor Ivanov — Foreign Minister of Russia from 1998 to 2004.
- Andrey Bocharov — 5th Governor of Volgograd Oblast
- Stas Namin — Leader of the Soviet music group, Tsvety and the grandson of Soviet politician Anastas Mikoyan..
- Vladimir Gruzdev — 4th Governor of Tula Oblast
- Vladimir Makarenko — Russian orientalist, linguist, lexicographer, and translator.
- Igor Sergun — Director of GRU from 2011 to 2016.

== Gallery ==
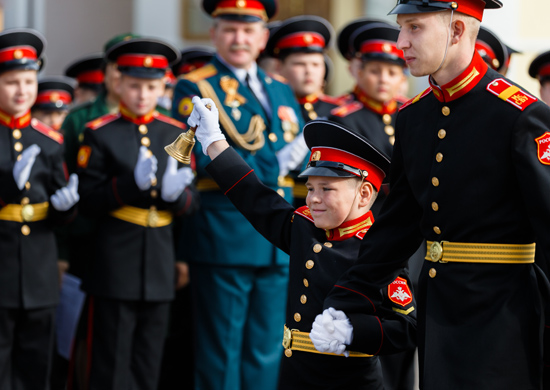

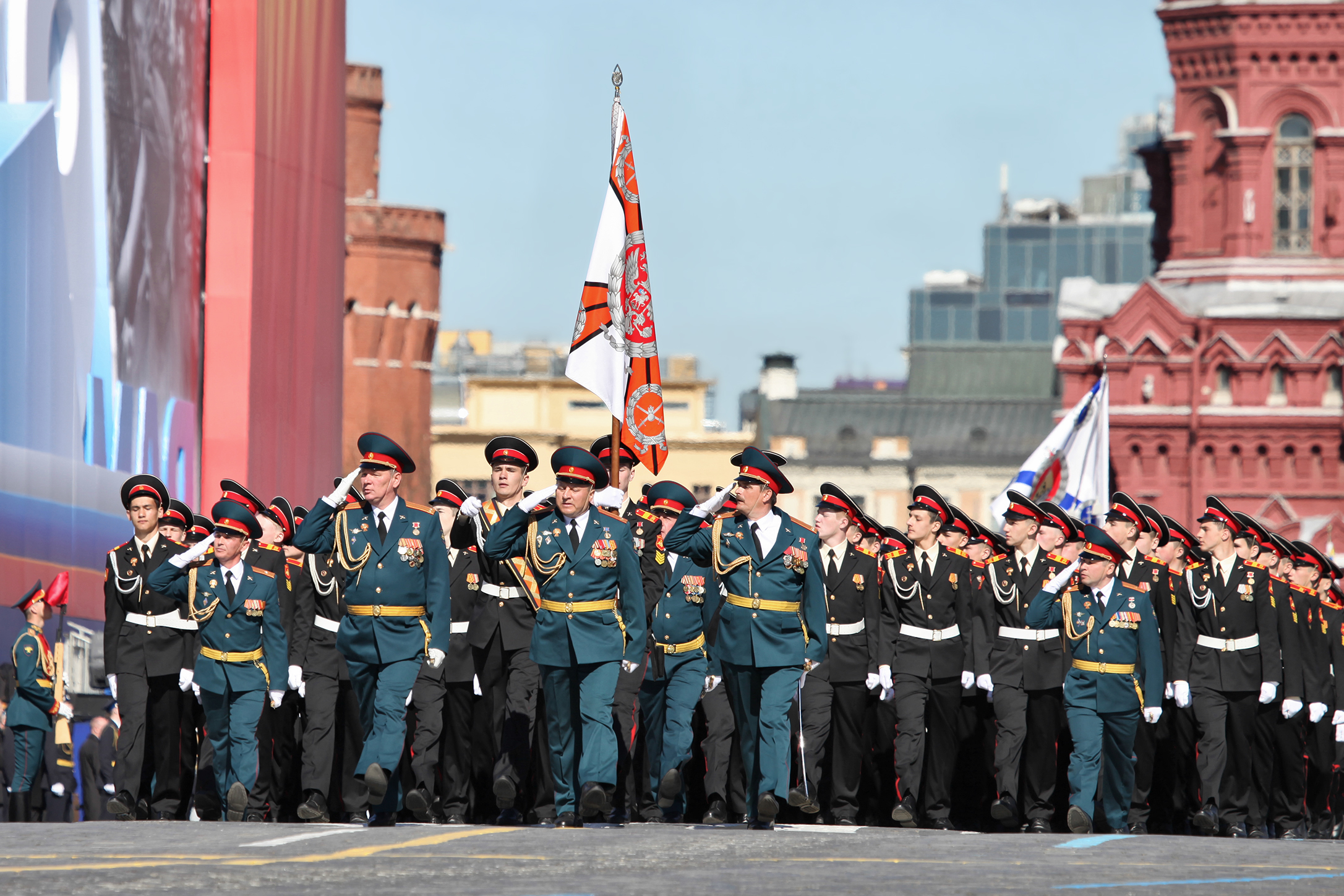

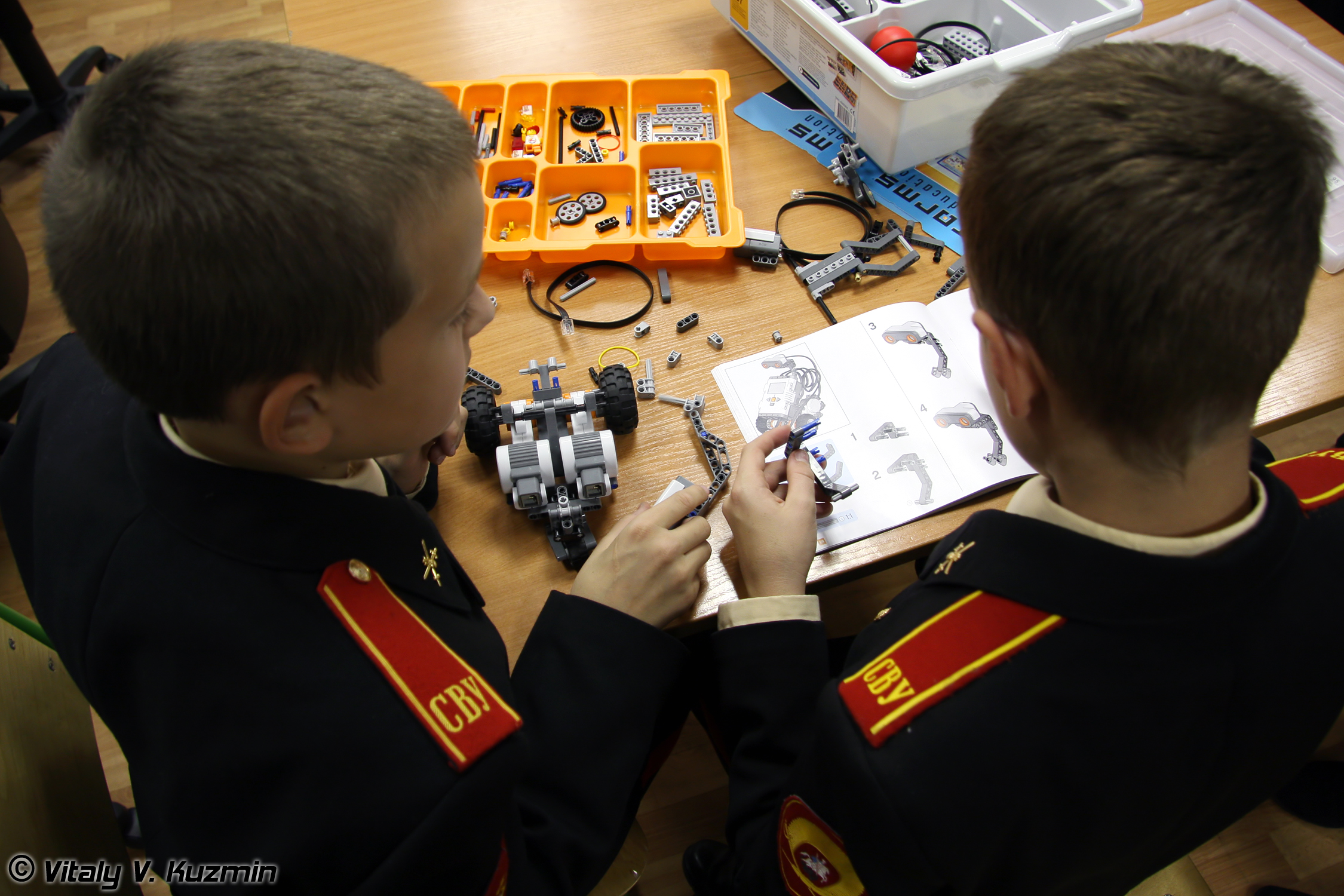

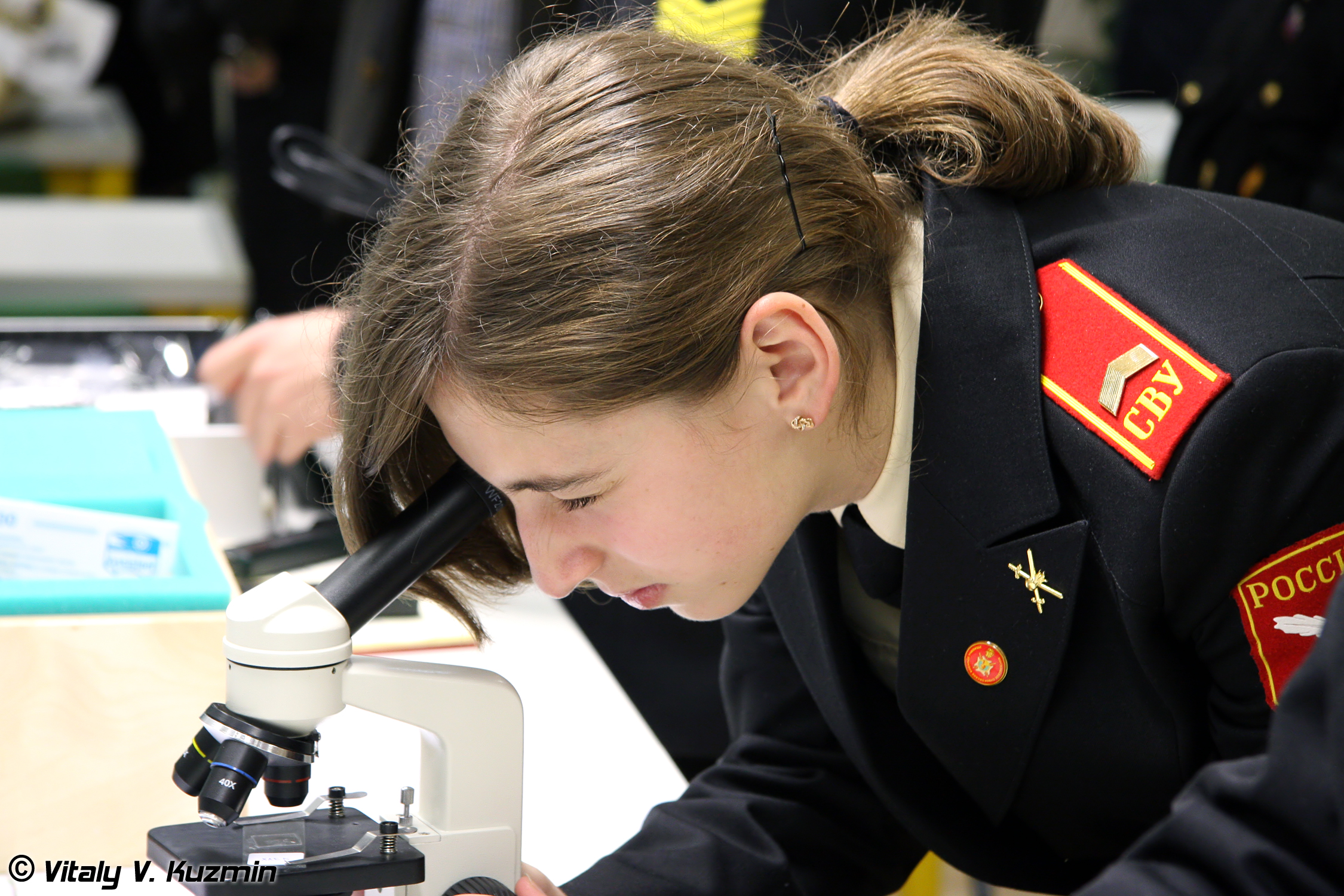

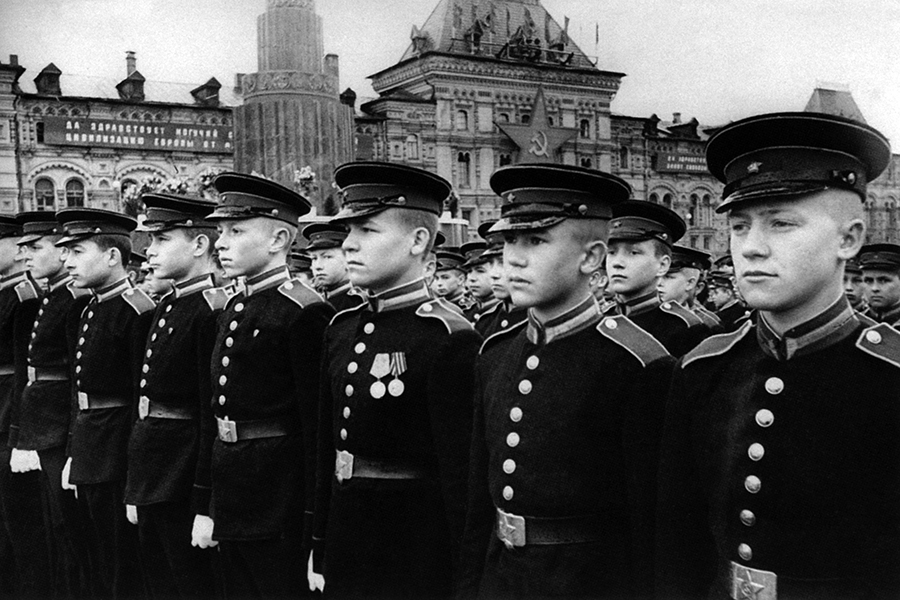

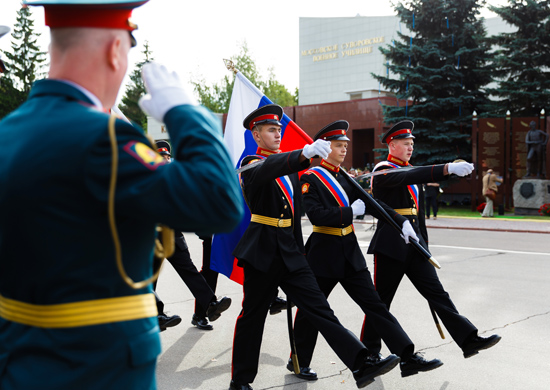
