= Military education in the Soviet Union =

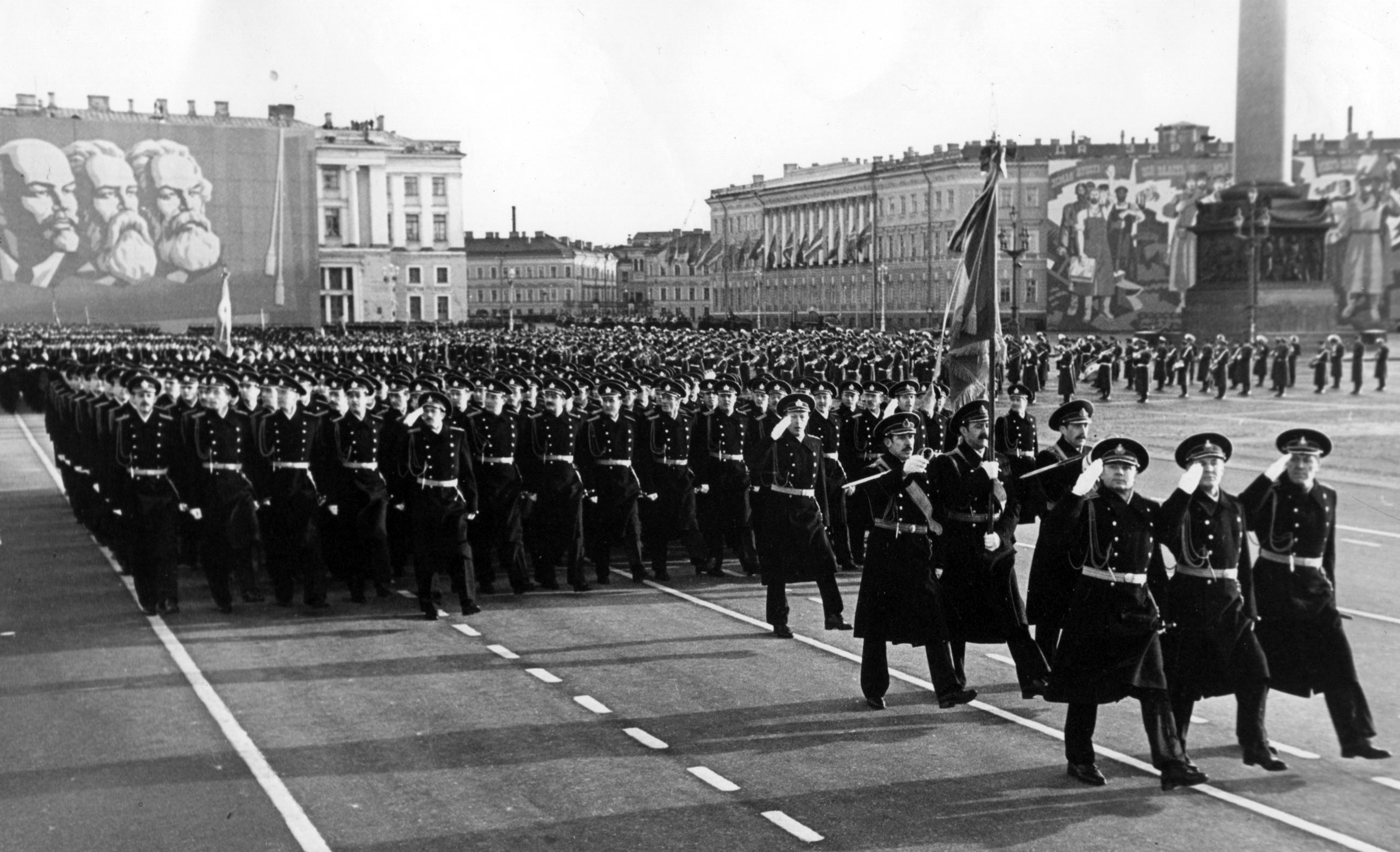
The Gretchko Naval Academy, led by Captain Anatoliy Karpenko, during a parade on Leningrad's Palace Square in 1983.

There existed an evolved system of military education in the Soviet Union that covered a wide range of ages. The Soviet Armed Forces had many tri-service educational opportunities as well as educational institutions for the Soviet Ground Forces, the Air Forces, and the Navy. The Soviet Border Troops, the KGB and the Internal Troops also maintained service academies.

== Overview ==
=== Commissioned officers training ===
Soviet military academies provided higher education to higher officers and officers of specialized kinds of armed force (engineering, medical, etc.). All able-bodied male students of civilian universities and many other institutions of higher education were subject to mandatory training at the military departments (Russian: военная кафедра) within these institutions to become reserve officers (although not all civilian institutions had military departments). Training at military departments of civilian institutions of higher education was mandatory also for all able-bodied female medical students. Soviet professional military education was also available for persons from the Soviet satellite states and from the perceived Soviet sphere of influence among the Third World countries.

Soviet military education was aimed at training of officer-specialists in narrowly defined military occupational specialties, and it differed greatly from American military education system in which newly qualified second lieutenants receive particular specialties in the framework of their "career branch" only after graduation from military academy or ROTC. Students of Soviet civilian universities having military departments could not choose military occupational specialty because each civilian specialty taught by university was attached to particular military occupational specialty taught by military department of the same university by the rector's order, and it also differed from American military education system in which student can choose between available types of ROTC.

In addition, there were 2 other ways to receive officer rank in USSR: junior officers courses and special assessment at the conclusion of conscript service. Junior officers courses were open to persons completed secondary school and finished their military service as conscripts. Persons graduated from civilian institutions of higher education without military departments and drafted into military service as soldier/sailor could pass special exams at the end of their conscript service; such persons were demobbed with officer's rank. Unlike graduates of military schools and military departments within civilian universities, persons who used these ways were promoted to junior lieutenant as first officer's rank, but not lieutenant.

After several years service, officer could get into military academy of branch of service to deepen his military occupational specialty knowledges. Graduates of such academies could be promoted to colonel/captain 1st rank and to appointed to a position of the commander of regiment/first-rate warship.

After graduating from a military academy of branch of service and several years service in relevant positions, an officer could be accepted into the Military Academy of the General Staff of the Armed Forces. This academy trained a highest ranking military officers.

Teaching staff of military academies was prepared in adjunctura established in 1938. Adjunctura was a military analogue of graduate school. Officers enrolled in adjunctura were called adjuncts. They wrote theses in the military field and got academic degree of candidate of military sciences after successful defense. Officer with such degree could be appointed to a teaching position in military academy but also he could continue to serve in military units.

=== Warrant officers training ===
Warrant officers schools were established by the Minister of defense Order of 20 December 1980 №365. Only enlisted personnel and non-commissioned officers, finished their military service as conscripts, could be accepted to enter warrant officers schools. The period of training was ten and half months.

=== Enlisted personnel and non-commissioned officers training ===
All able-bodied males obtained basic and specialized military training during obligatory 2-3 year male draft. There also existed schools for non-commissioned officers, often part of the draft service for distinguished soldiers, as a step towards the professional military career. Reservists were subject to periodic training exercises of duration 2–6 weeks once in several years.

=== Military secondary schools and pre-conscription preparatory courses ===
Suvorov Military Schools for boys of 14-17 (established in 1943) delivered education in military subjects. Nakhimov Naval Schools were similar to the Suvorov ones, specializing in Navy subjects. Civilians could receive military-related training in military-support organizations DOSAAF (initial name was OSOAVIAKHIM).

== Under the Ministry of Defense ==
=== General Staff of the Armed Forces ===
==== Academies ====
- Military Academy of the General Staff of the Armed Forces (Moscow)
- Military Diplomatic Academy (Moscow)

==== Institutes ====
- Military Institute of the Ministry of Defense

==== Engineering ====
- Voronezh Higher Military Engineering College of Radio Electronics
- Cherepovets Higher Military Engineering College of Radio Electronics

==== Special communications ====
- Shtemenko Krasnodar Military Institute

==== Specialists ====
- 8th Central Officer Refresher Courses for Officers of Mobilization Bodies of the Armed Forces (Saratov)

=== Main Directorate of International Military Cooperation ===
- Krasnodar Higher Military Aviation School of Pilots
- Odessa Higher Military Combined Command Engineering School of Air Defense
- Odessa Higher United Military School Odessa Higher Combined Arms Command School?
- Simferopol United Military School (Perevalnoye)
- 5th Central Courses for the Training and Improvement of Aviation Personnel (Kant)

=== Office of the Chief of Space Facilities ===
- A.F. Mozhaysky Military-Engineering School
- Riga Higher Military Political School (one faculty)

=== Main Political Directorate of the Soviet Army and Navy ===
==== Academies ====
- Lenin Military-Political Academy

==== Military-Political ====
- Donetsk Military Political College of Engineers and Signal Corps
- Kiev Naval Political College
- Lvov Military-Political School
- Minsk Higher Military-Political School
- Riga Higher Military Political School
- Tallinn Higher Military-Political Construction School
- Kurgan Higher Military-Political Aviation School
- Leningrad Higher Military-Political School of Air Defense named after Yuri Andropov
- Novosibirsk Higher Military-Political Combined Arms School named after the 60th anniversary of the Great October Socialist Revolution
- Sverdlovsk Higher Military-Political Tank-Artillery School named after Leonid Brezhnev
- Simferopol Higher Military-Political Construction School

=== Under other departments ===
- Military Institute of Physical Culture (under the Sports Committee)
- Military Institute of Military Conductors (under the Military Band Service)
- Leningrad Higher Military Topographic Command School (under the Military Topographical Directorate of the General Staff)
- Military Law Department of the Military Institute (under the Legal Service)

== Rear of the Soviet Army ==
=== Academies ===
- Military Academy of Logistics and Transport (Leningrad)

=== Command ===
- Moscow Higher Command School of Road and Engineering Troops (Balashikha)

=== Rear ===
- Volsky Higher Military School of Logistics
- Gorki Higher Military School of Logistics named after Ivan Bagramyan

=== Engineering ===
- Ulyanovsk Higher Military Technical School named after Bohdan Khmelnytsky

== Under the Soviet Ground Forces ==
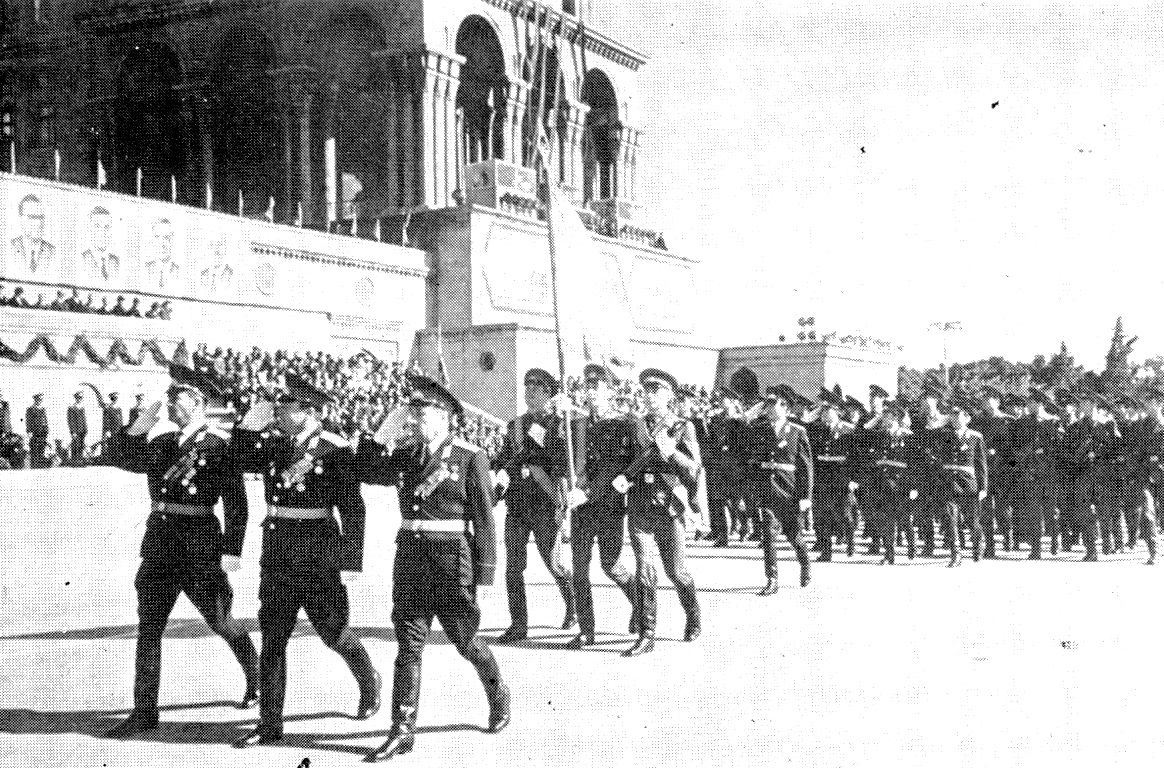
The Baku Higher Combined Arms Command School during a parade in Baku in 1970.

=== Combined Arms Institutions ===
==== Academies ====
- Frunze Military Academy

==== Command ====
- Alma-Ata Higher All-Arms Command School
- Baku Higher Combined Arms Command School
- Far Eastern Higher Combined Arms Command School
- Kiev Higher Combined Arms Command School
- Moscow Higher Military Command School
- Tashkent Higher All-Arms Command School

=== Tank Forces ===
==== Academies ====
- Malinovsky Military Armored Forces Academy

==== Command ====
- Tashkent Higher Tank Command School
- Blagoveshchenskoye Higher Tank Command School
- Kazan Higher Tank Command School
- Ulyanovsk Guards Higher Tank Command School
- Kharkov Guards Higher Tank Command School
- Chelyabinsk Higher Tank Command School

==== Engineering ====
- Kiev Higher Tank Engineering School
- Omsk Higher Tank Engineering School

=== Rocket and Artillery Forces (GRAU) ===
==== Academies ====
- Kalinin Military Artillery Academy (Leningrad)

==== Command ====
- Kolomensky High Artillery Command School (ru:Коломенское_высшее_артиллерийское_командное_училище) - disbanded September 1, 1996.
- Leningrad Higher Artillery Command School
- Odessa Higher Artillery Command School
- Sumy Higher Artillery Command School
- Tbilisi Higher Artillery Command School
- Khmelnytsky Higher Artillery Command School

==== Command-Engineering ====
- Kazan Higher Military Command-Engineering School
- Saratov Higher Military Command-Engineering School

=== Signal Troops ===
==== Academies ====
- Budyonny Military Academy of the Signal Corps

==== Command ====
- Kemerovo Higher Military Command Liaison School
- Novocherkassk Higher Military Command School of Communications (ru:Новочеркасское высшее военное командное училище связи)
- Poltava Higher Military Command School
- Ryazan Higher Military Command School of Communications
- Tomsk Higher Military Command School of Communications
- Ulyanovsk Higher Military Command School of Communications

==== Engineering ====
- Kiev Higher Military Engineering School of Communications
- Leningrad Higher Military Engineering School

=== Engineering Forces ===
==== Academies ====
- Kuibishev Military Engineering Academy

==== Command ====
- Kamenets-Podolsk Higher Military Engineering Command School
- Tyumen Higher Military Engineering Command School

==== Engineering ====
- Kaliningrad Higher School of Engineering

=== Chemical Troops ===
==== Academies ====
- Timoshenko NBC Protection Military Academy

==== Command ====
- Kostroma Higher Military Command School of Chemical Defense
- Tambov Higher Military Command School of Chemical Defense

==== Engineering ====
- Saratov Higher Military Engineering School of Chemical Defense

=== Air Defence Troops of the Ground Forces ===
==== Academies ====
- Vasilevsky Military Academy of Army Air Defence Forces

==== Command ====
- Leningrad Higher Anti-Aircraft Missile Command School
- Orenburg Higher Anti-Aircraft Missile Command School
- Poltava Higher Anti-Aircraft Missile Command School

==== Engineering ====
- Kiev Higher Anti-Aircraft Missile Engineering School
- Smolensk Higher Anti-Aircraft Missile Engineering School

=== Soviet Airborne Forces ===
==== Command ====
- Ryazan Guards Higher Airborne Command School

=== Automotive Troops ===
- Ussuriysk Higher Military Automotive Command School (ru:Уссурийское высшее военное автомобильное командное училище). The school was disbanded in June 2007, and replaced by a centre for the training of automotive service specialists, in turned disbanded 2012. After that the 70th Guards Motor Rifle Brigade (from 2018, 114th Guards MRR / 127 MRD) took over the site.
- Ryazan' Higher Military Automotive Engineering School
- Chelyabinsk Higher Military Automotive Engineering School
- Samarkand Higher Military Automobile Command School

== Under the Soviet Air Defence Forces ==
=== Academies ===
- Zhukov Air and Space Defence Academy
- Govorov Military Radio Engineering Academy

=== Command ===
- Gorky Higher Anti-Aircraft Missile Command School
- Dnepropetrovsk Higher Anti-Aircraft Missile Command School
- Ordzhonikidze Higher Anti-Aircraft Missile Command School
- Engels Higher Anti-Aircraft Missile Command School of Air Defense
- Yaroslavl Higher Military School of Anti-Aircraft Warfare
- Vilnius Higher Command School of Radio Electronics
- Krasnodar Higher Military Aviation School

=== Command and engineering ===
- Zhytomir Higher School of Radio Electronics
- Pushkin Higher School of Air Defense

=== Engineering ===
- Minsk Higher Engineering Anti-aircraft Missile School
- Kiev Higher Engineering Radio Engineering School

=== Pilots ===
- Armavir Higher Military Aviation School of Pilots
- Stavropol Higher Military Aviation School of Pilots and Navigators PVO

== Under the Soviet Air Force ==
=== Academies ===
- Gagarin Air Force Academy
- Zhukovsky Air Force Engineering Academy

=== Flying and Navigator Schools ===
- Balashov Higher Military Aviation School
- Barnaul Higher Military Aviation School
- Borisoglebsk Higher Military Aviation School of Pilots
- Yeysk Higher Military Order of Lenin Aviation School - Yeysk Airport. Full title from 1967 the Yeysk Higher Military order of Lenin Aviation School im. twice Hero of the Soviet Union Pilot-Cosmonaut V.M. Komarov (EVVAU). Viktor Pugachev graduated from the school in 1970.
- Kacha Higher Military Aviation School of Pilots
- Krasnodar Higher Military Aviation School of Pilots
- Orenburg Higher Military Aviation School for Pilots
- Saratov Higher Military Aviation School
- Syzran Higher Military Aviation School
- Tambov Higher Military Aviation School
- Ufa Higher Military Aviation School
- Kharkov Higher Military Aviation School
- Chernigov Higher Military Aviation School
- Lugansk Higher Military Aviation School of Navigators
- Chelyabinsk Red Banner Military Aviation Institute of Navigators

=== Engineering ===
- Voronezh Higher Military Aviation Engineering School
- Daugavpils Higher Military Aviation Engineering School
- Irkutsk Higher Military Aviation Engineering School
- Kiev Military Aviation Engineering Academy
- Riga Higher Military Aviation Engineering School
- Tambov Higher Military Aviation Engineering School
- Kharkov Higher Military Aviation Engineering School
- Kharkov Higher Military Aviation School of Radio Electronics

=== Medium Technical Aviation ===
- Achinsk Military Aviation Technical School
- Vasilkovskoe Military Aviation Technical School
- Kaliningrad Military Aviation Technical School
- Kirov Military Aviation Technical School (Volgograd)
- Lomonosov Military Aviation Technical School (Lebyazhye, Lomonosovsky District, Leningrad Oblast)
- Perm Military Aviation Technical School

== Under the Soviet Navy ==
=== Academies ===
- Gretchko Naval Academy (Leningrad)
- Higher Special Officer Classes (Leningrad)

=== Command ===
- M. V. Frunze Naval College (Leningrad)
- Kaliningrad Higher Naval School
- Caspian Higher Naval School (Baku)
- Pacific Higher Naval School (Vladivostok)
- Nakhimov Black Sea Higher Naval School (Sevastopol)
- Lenin Komsomol Submarine Navigation Higher Naval School (Leningrad)

=== Engineering ===
- Dzerzhinsky Higher Naval Engineering School (Leningrad)
- "V.I. Lenin" Leningrad Higher Naval Engineering School (Pushkin)
- Sevastopol Higher Naval Engineering School
- Naval Radio Electronics College "Alexander Stepanovich Popov" (Petrodvorets)

=== Secondary and primary vocational education ===
- Auxiliary Fleet (civilian specialists)
- Lomonosov Naval School

== Under of the Strategic Missile Forces ==
=== Academies ===
- Dzerzhinsky Missile Force Academy (Moscow)

=== Engineering ===
- Serpukhov Higher Military Command and Engineering School of Rocket Forces named after the Lenin Komsomol
- Krasnodar Higher Military Command and Engineering School of the Missile Forces
- Perm Higher Military Command and Engineering Red Banner School of Missile Forces
- Rostov Higher Military Command and Engineering School of Missile Forces
- Kharkov Higher Military Command and Engineering School of Missile Forces
- Stavropol Higher Military Engineering School of Communications named after the "60th anniversary of Great October"

== Under the Ministry of Internal Affairs ==
=== Internal Troops ===
==== Command ====
- Novosibirsk Higher Military Command School of the Internal
- Ordzhonikidze Higher Military Command School of the Internal Troops named after S.M. Kirov
- Perm Higher Military Command School of the Internal Troops
- Saratov Higher Military Command School of the Internal Troops named after Dzerzhinsky

=== Rear ===
- Kharkov Higher Military School of Logistics of the Internal Troops

=== Military-political ===
- Leningrad Higher Political-School of Internal Troops named after the 60th anniversary of the Komsomol

== Under the KGB ==
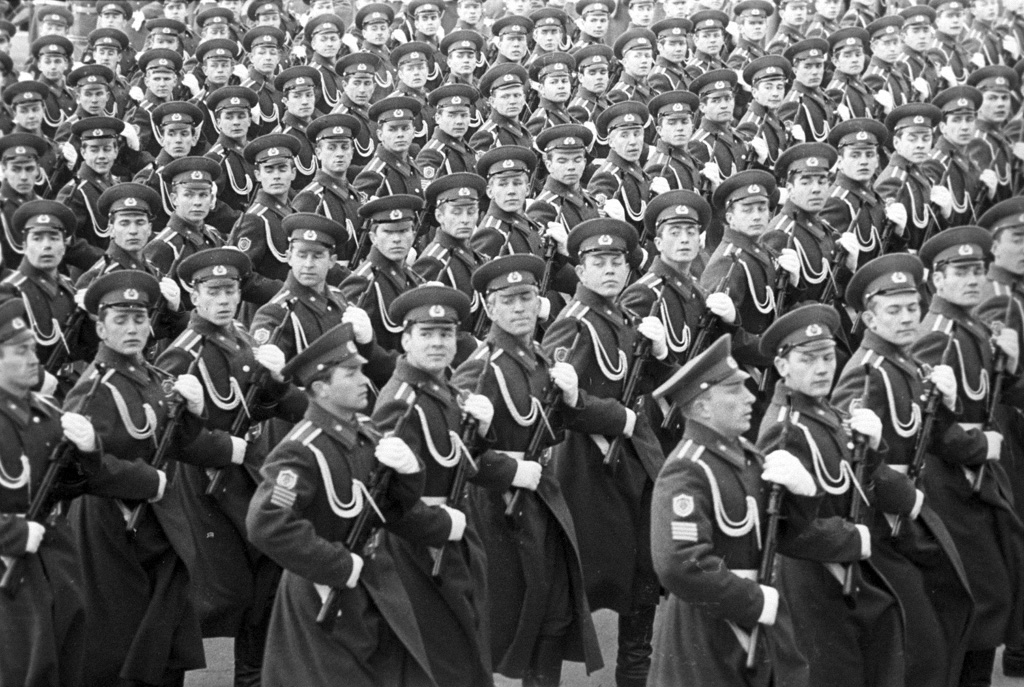
Cadets of the Moscow Border Military School of the KGB under the Council of Ministers during the 1972 October Revolution Parade.

- Dzerzhinsky Higher School of the KGB (Moscow)
- Higher Courses of the KGB (Alma-Ata)
- Higher Courses of the KGB (Gorky)
- Higher Courses of the KGB (Kyiv)
- Higher Courses of the KGB (Leningrad)
- Higher Courses of the KGB (Minsk)
- Higher Courses of the KGB of the USSR (Sverdlovsk)
- Higher Courses of the KGB of the USSR (Tashkent)
- Higher Courses of the KGB of the USSR (Tbilisi)

=== First Chief Directorate ===
- Yuri Andropov Institute of the KGB

=== Third Chief Directorate ===
- Courses of Military Counterintelligence (Novosibirsk)

=== Soviet Border Troops ===
- Higher Border Command Courses (Moscow)

==== Command ====
- Higher Border Command School of the KGB named after Dzerzhinsky (Alma-Ata)
- Moscow Border Guards Institute of the Border Defence Forces of the KGB "Moscow City Council"

==== Military-political ====
- Voroshilov Higher Border Military-Political School of the KGB (Golitsyno)

=== Government Liaison Troops ===
==== Command ====
- Oryol "Mikhail Kalinin" Higher Military Command School of Communications of the KGB

== Under the Ministry of Medium Machine Building ==
- Volga Higher Military Construction Command School (Dubna)

== Under the Ministry of Construction in the Eastern Regions ==
- Khabarovsk Higher Military Construction School

== Secondary Schools under the Ministry of Defense ==
- Suvorov Military School
  - Yekaterinburg Suvorov Military School
  - Kazan Suvorov Military School
  - Moscow Suvorov Military School
  - Moscow Military Music College
  - Leningrad Suvorov Military School
  - Kalinin Suvorov Military School
  - Ussuriysk Suvorov Military School
  - Kiev Suvorov Military School
  - Minsk Suvorov Military School
- Nakhimov Naval School
  - Nakhimov Naval School (Leningrad)

== Secondary schools under the Ministry of Higher Education ==
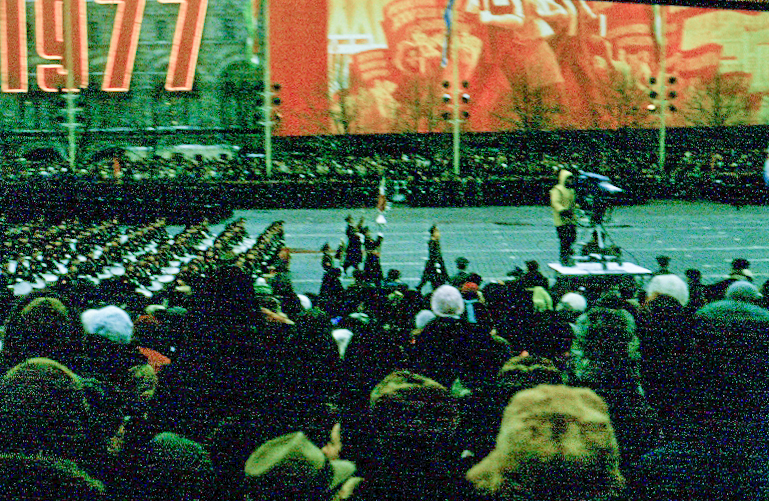
The Moscow Military Music College during the 1977 October Revolution Parade

The task of these schools were to train future officers from among the Soviet nationalities.

- Republican Special Boarding School with in-depth study of the Russian language and enhanced military-physical training named after Hero of the Soviet Union Baurzhan Momyshuly (Alma-Ata)
- Republican Special Boarding School with in-depth study of the Russian language and enhanced military-physical training (Ashgabat)
- Republican Special Boarding School with in-depth study of the Russian language and enhanced military-physical training (Chișinău)
- Republican Special Boarding School with in-depth study of the Russian language and enhanced military-physical training (Lviv)
- Republican Special Boarding School with in-depth study of the Russian language and enhanced military-physical training (Riga)
- Republican Special Boarding School with in-depth study of the Russian language and enhanced military-physical training (Tashkent)
- Republican Special Boarding School with in-depth study of the Russian language and enhanced military-physical training (Tbilisi)
- Republican special boarding school with in-depth study of the Russian language and enhanced military-physical training named after the 60th anniversary of the Communist Party of Kirghizia (Frunze)
- Special Boarding School with in-depth study of the Russian language and enhanced military-physical training (Baku)
- Special Boarding School with in-depth study of the Russian language and enhanced military-physical training (Dushanbe)
- Special Boarding School with in-depth study of the Russian language and enhanced military-physical training (Karaganda)
- Special Boarding School with in-depth study of the Russian language and enhanced military-physical training (Kryvyi Rih)
- Special Boarding School with in-depth study of the Russian language and enhanced military-physical training (Leninabad)
- Special Boarding School with in-depth study of the Russian language and enhanced military-physical training (Samarkand)
- Special Boarding School with in-depth study of the Russian language and enhanced military-physical training (Tashauz)
- Special Boarding School with in-depth study of the Russian language and enhanced military-physical training (Urgench)
- Special Boarding School with in-depth study of the Russian language and enhanced military-physical training (Fergana)
- Special Boarding School with in-depth study of the Russian language and enhanced military-physical training (Cherkessk)
- Special Boarding School with in-depth study of the Russian language and enhanced military-physical training (Shymkent)

== See also ==
- Military academies in Russia
