= 1977 October Revolution Parade =

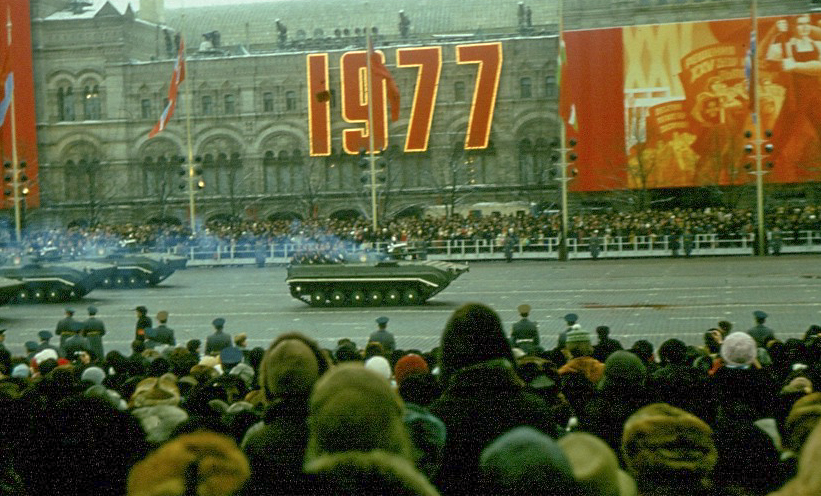
Soviet vehicles in parade

The 1977 October Revolution Parade was a military parade that took place in Red Square in Moscow on 7 November 1977 to commemorate the 60th anniversary (diamond jubilee) of the October Revolution. The annual parade marks the protest of the Bolsheviks against the Tsarist autocracy of the Russian Empire. The Soviet Communist Party General Secretary Leonid Brezhnev and Soviet Prime Minister Alexei Kosygin attended the parade, among other foreign leaders from the Warsaw Pact and allied countries who decided to fly in for the celebrations. Marshal Dmitry Ustinov delivered his second holiday address to the Soviet people on this day, right after the parade inspection that had been presided over by him and led by the commander of the Moscow Military District Colonel General Vladimir Govorov. Music was performed by the Combined Military Band of the Moscow Garrison conducted by Colonel Nikolai Mikhailov. As per tradition, 14 other Soviet Cities (including Leningrad) held their parades on this day. A folding stock version of the AK-47 appeared in the contingent of troops from the Soviet Airborne Forces. This parade included the updated anthem of the Soviet Union.

== International dignitaries ==
Country	Dignitary	Position	Photo
German Democratic Republic	Erich Honecker	President	
Mongolian People's Republic	Yumjaagiin Tsedenbal	President	
Czechoslovak Socialist Republic	Gustav Husak	President	
People's Republic of Bulgaria	Todor Zhivkov	President	
Socialist Republic of Romania	Nicolae Ceausescu	President	
Hungarian People's Republic	János Kádár	President	
Polish People's Republic	Henryk Jabłoński	President	
(Cambodia) Democratic Kampuchea	Norodom Sihanouk	President	

== Parade units ==
=== Military bands ===
- Massed Bands of the Moscow Military District under the direction of Major General Nikolai Mikhailov, Senior Director of Music of the Bands Service
- Corps of Drums of the Moscow Military Music School

=== Ground column ===
Leading the column was the limousine carrying the parade commander, Col. General Vladimir Govrov, the commanding general of Moscow Military District.

- Color Guard Unit
- Frunze Military Academy
- V.I. Lenin Military Political Academy
- Felix Dzerzhinsky Artillery Academy
- Military Armored Forces Academy Marshal Rodion Malinovsky
- Military Engineering Academy
- Military Academy of Chemical Defense and Control
- Yuri Gagarin Air Force Academy
- Prof. Nikolai Zhukovsky Air Force Engineering Academy
- Naval Engineering Institute
- Moscow Border Guards Institute of the Border Defence Forces of the KGB "Moscow City Council"
- Active military units:
  - 98th Guards Airborne Division
  - OMSDON
  - 336th Marine Regiment of the Baltic Fleet
- Suvorov Military School
- Nakhimov Naval School
- Moscow Military High Command Training School "Supreme Soviet of the Russian SFSR"

=== Mobile column ===
The parade saw the return of military tanks after a two-year hiatus. The highlight was the T-72 tank was first publicly seen at this parade. The parade also featured a full return to the iconic armor columns and missiles in the second half of the military portion of the parade.

== Gallery ==
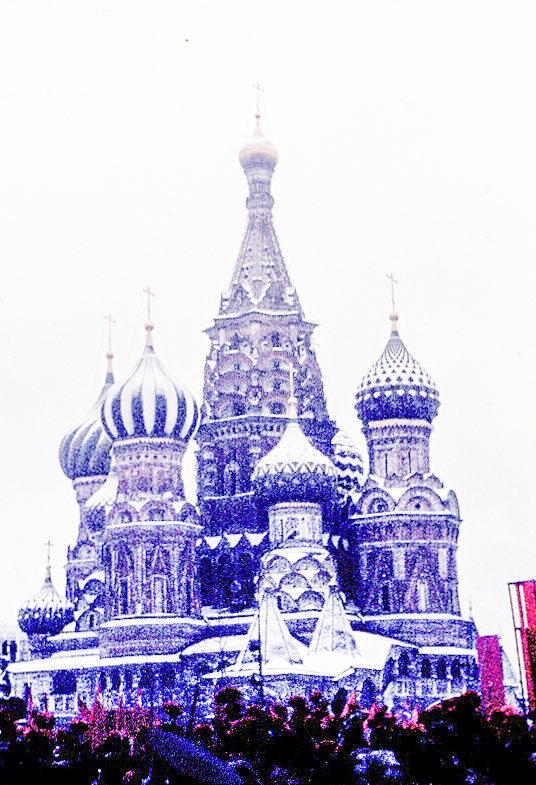
Saint Basil's Cathedral before the parade

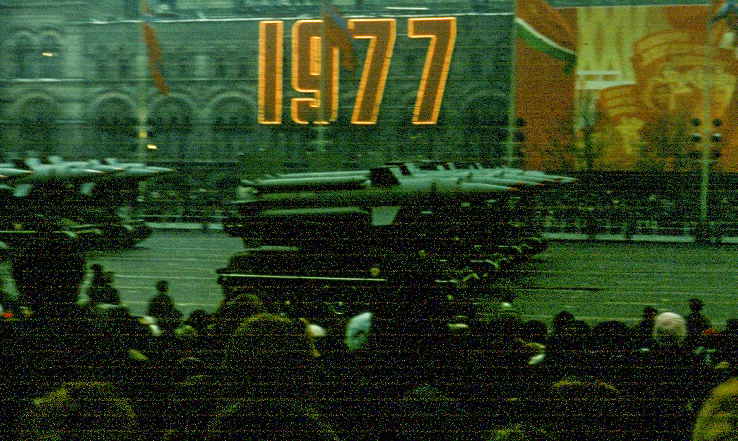
Tanks on Red Square

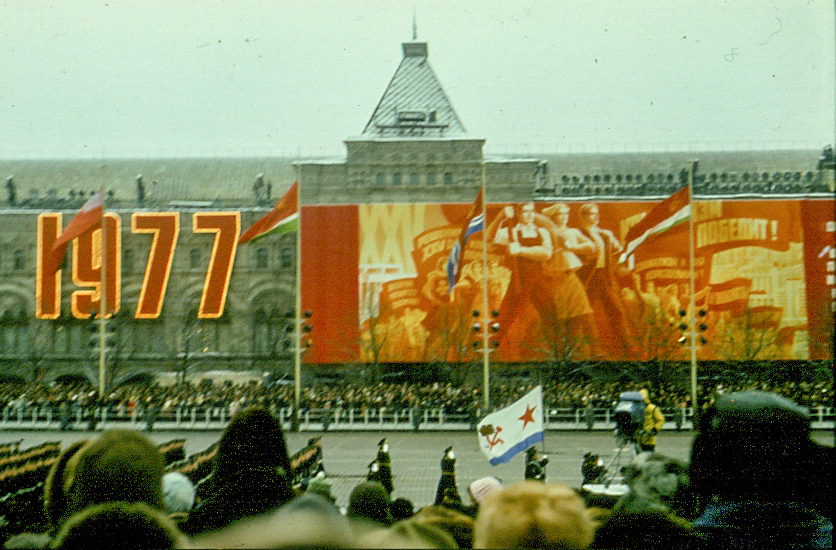
Troops of the Nakhimov Military Academy on Red Square

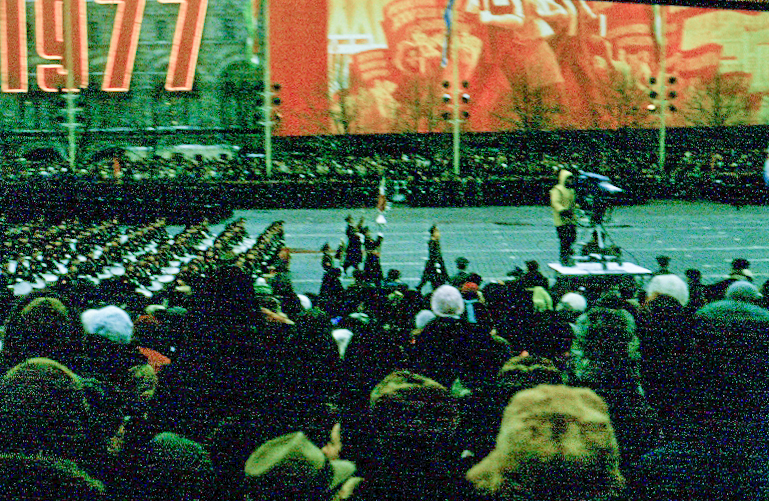
Corps of Drummers of the Moscow Suvorov Military Academy

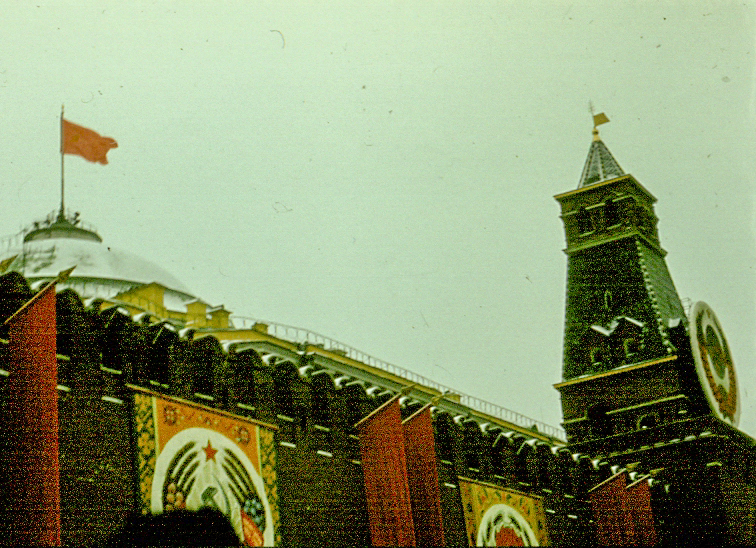
The Kremlin during the parade

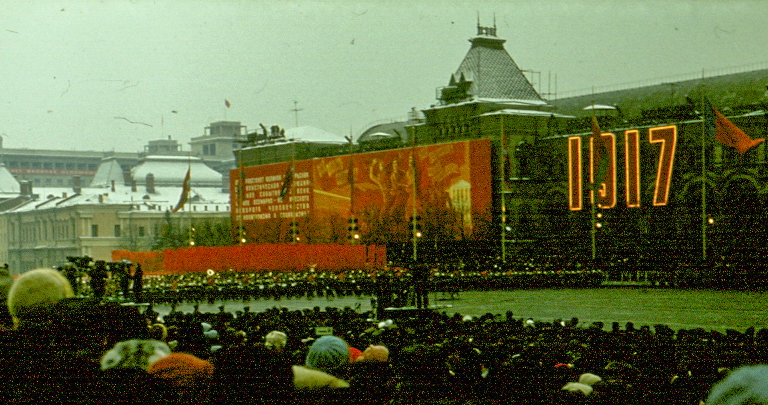
The Massed Bands during the parade finale

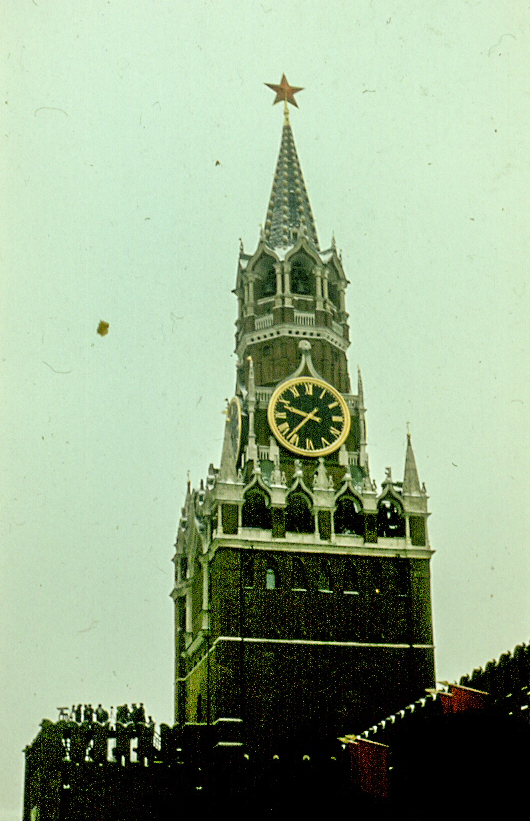
Spasskaya Tower during the parade

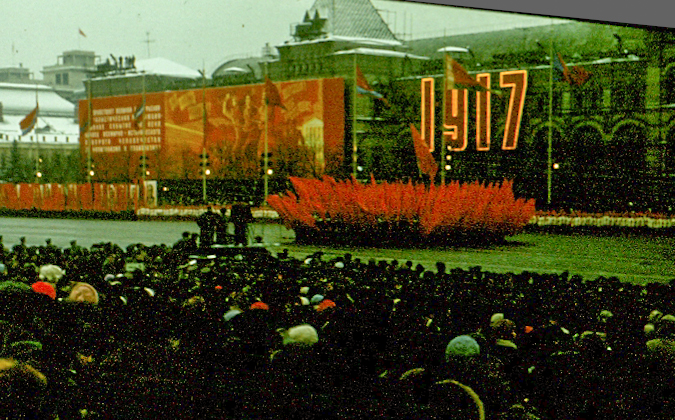
Demonstrations during the parade
