= Georgy Ivanishchev =

Georgy Stepanovich Ivanishchev
- Георгий Степанович Иванищев
- Ivanishchev, 1948
- Born: 2 April 1914; Grigoryevka Pervaya, Orenburgsky Uyezd, Orenburg Governorate, Russian Empire
- Died: 12 March 1968 (aged 53); Kharkov, Ukrainian SSR, Soviet Union
- Military career
- Allegiance: Soviet Union
- Branch: Red Army (Soviet Army from 1946)
- Service years: 1936–1964
- Rank: Major general
- Commands: 21st Guards Mechanized Division; 20th Guards Rifle Division
- Conflicts: World War II
- Awards: Hero of the Soviet Union; Order of Lenin

Georgy Stepanovich Ivanishchev (2 April 1914 – 12 March 1968) was a Soviet Army major general and a Hero of the Soviet Union.

== Early life and prewar service ==
Georgy Stepanovich Ivanishchev was born to a peasant family on 2 April 1914 in the village of Grigoryevskaya Pervaya, Orenburg Oblast. After completing middle school, he graduated from the Higher Communist Agricultural School. From his youth Ivanishchev was active in the Komsomol organization, working as head of the cultural and education department of the Oktyabrsky District Komsomol committee, and from August 1933 was a propagandist and assistant head of the political department for the Komsomol of the Krasnovostochny machine tractor station. In August 1934 he rose to become secretary of the Yekaterinovsky District Komsomol and in August 1936 became head of the political education department of the Orenburg City Komsomol Committee.

Conscripted into the Red Army on 4 November 1936, Ivanishchev was enrolled as a cadet in the regimental school of the 44th Cavalry Regiment of the 11th Cavalry Division of the Belorussian Military District. After graduating from the regimental school in September 1937 he served in the divisional separate communications squadron as a squad leader, assistant platoon commander and starshina. From January to November 1938 he studied at the Kharkov Military Communications School, before being transferred to the Kharkov Military-Political School. In August 1939 he graduated from the latter and was sent to serve as assistant head of the political department responsible for the Komsomol in the 132nd Rifle Division of the Odessa Military District. Ivanishchev entered the Lenin Military-Political Academy in Moscow in October 1940.

== World War II ==
After the beginning of Operation Barbarossa, Ivanishchev continued his studies. From 2 October, with a special group of political workers of the Main Political Directorate he was dispatched to the Western Front, where he temporarily commanded a rifle battalion of the People's Militia with the 43rd Army. Seriously wounded on 29 October, Ivanishchev was hospitalized until 1 December, then continued his studies at the academy. After graduating from the war-accelerated course there in May 1942 he was posted to the 958th Rifle Regiment of the 299th Rifle Division as regimental commissar. The division was then forming at the Kovrov camps in the Moscow Military District, and was sent to fight in the Battle of Stalingrad in late August, with the 66th Army northwest of the city. From 20 October to 13 January 1943 Ivanishchev completed further training at the Vystrel course. After graduating from the course he was sent back to the Southern Front and on 19 February took command of the 366th Rifle Regiment of the 126th Rifle Division. The 126th held positions facing the Mius-Front, a heavily fortified German defensive line that Soviet troops repeatedly attempted to break through unsuccessfully.

On 18 March, the division took up defenses on the line of Verkhny Nagolchik and the mouth of the Krepkaya river, where it remained until the end of August. Then-Major Ivanishchev transferred to command the 550th Rifle Regiment of the division on 10 June. In August and September he led it in the Donbas strategic offensive, during which it liberated Gorlovka. In October the division was relocated to the Molochansk area where it defended the west bank of the Molochna river. From 16 October, as part of the 51st Army, the division fought in the Melitopol offensive. For exemplary execution of combat missions and demonstrating valor and courage the division was awarded the Order of the Red Banner on 23 October. The soldiers and commanders of the 550th Rifle Regiment displayed mass heroism in these battles, repulsing sixteen counterattacks, inflicting significant personnel and equipment losses on the German forces. In recognition of his leadership then-Lieutenant Colonel Ivanishchev was awarded the title Hero of the Soviet Union on 1 November. During April and May the division fought with the 2nd Shock Army in the Crimean offensive. In the battle for Sevastopol on 1 May Ivanishchev was seriously wounded.

After recovering in July Ivanishchev was awaiting assignment with the 3rd Ukrainian Front, and in September became deputy commander of the 20th Guards Rifle Division, which following the Second Jassy–Kishinev offensive was placed in reserve with the 37th Army in Sliven. The division was relocated to the Sombor region to join the 57th Army in November. Ferried across the Danube near Batina on 26 November, the 20th Guards went on the offensive and advanced 140 kilometers in eleven days, capturing 130 fortified points, including the cities of Pécs, Szigetvár, Kadarkút, and the station of Szentlőrinc. Reaching the area of Marcali, south of Lake Balaton, the division went on the defensive on 9 December. On 18 December during the battles in Hungary, commanding the vanguard of the 6th Guards Rifle Corps near Kaposvár, Ivanishchev was seriously wounded and evacuated.

After months in the hospital Ivanishchev was appointed military advisor to the 10th Infantry Division of the 1st Bulgarian Army upon recovery in March 1945. Participating in the Balaton Offensive, he was awarded the Bulgarian Order of Bravery, 4th grade, 1st class on 19 May for his actions during the offensive. Ivanishchev returned to temporarily command the 20th Guards Rifle Division on 23 March, leading it in the Vienna offensive. On 29 March, the division, as part of the 6th Guards Rifle Corps, conducted an encirclement in mountainous and forested terrain, destroying a tank division on the approaches to the city of Nagykanizsa, enabling the corps to capture the oil-producing area. Subsequently, developing the offensive along the Mur river, the division captured the city of Graz in cooperation with neighboring units on 9 May.

Hero of the Soviet Union citation

Lieutenant Colonel Ivanishchev, commanding the 550th Rifle Regiment, in the battles for the liberation of the city of Melitopol, displayed great mastery in directing the battle, bravery and persistence. Despite the extraordinarily stubborn resistance of the enemy, and continuous counterattacks, the regiment of Lieutenant Colonel Ivanishchev successfully carried out the task assigned to it and cleared the enemy from the canning factory, tree nursery, and Melitopol-2. As a result of the stubborn battles of the regiment the regiment of Comrade Ivanishchev repulsed sixteen fierce enemy counterattacks and destroyed the following enemy equipment: 29 tanks, of which two were Tiger [tanks], one artillery piece, four self-propelled guns, seventeen mortars, 48 machine guns, twelve vehicles, and captured major trophies, including one tank and eight machine guns. In total up to 1,780 soldiers and officers of the enemy were wiped out and the fire of six batteries suppressed. Deserving of the award - Hero of the Soviet Union.

== Postwar ==
After the end of the war, Ivanishchev continued to command the division in the Southern Group of Forces, and from August served as its deputy commander. In January 1946 he transferred to serve as deputy commander of the 68th Guards Rifle Division. From June 1946 he commanded the 187th Guards Rifle Regiment of the 61st Guards Rifle Division, and from December, the 81st Guards Mechanized Regiment of the 25th Guards Mechanized Division. From December 1950 to November 1952 Ivanishchev studied at the Voroshilov Higher Military Academy, and after graduating was appointed chief of staff of the 23rd Tank Division of the 8th Mechanized Army in the Carpathian Military District. From February 1953 he served in the same position in the 31st Tank Division. From May 1954 he was sent to East Germany as military advisor to the commander of a National People's Army mechanized division. In December 1955 he was appointed first deputy head of the combat training department of the 4th Guards Mechanized Army in the Group of Soviet Forces in Germany. Ivanishchev then commanded the 21st Guards Mechanized Division of the 8th Guards Army from May 1956, his last combat command. His last assignment was as head of the Far Eastern Suvorov Military School in Ussuriysk from July 1958, being promoted to major general in 1959. Ivanishchev retired due to his health on 27 July 1964 and lived in Kharkov, where he died on 12 March 1968, after a serious illness.

== Decorations ==
- Order of Lenin
- Order of the Red Banner (2)
- Order of Bogdan Khmelnitsky, 2nd class
- Order of Kutuzov, 3rd class
- Order of the Red Star
- Order of Bravery (Bulgaria), 4th grade, 1st class
