= Leonid Ivashov =

Russian military and public official (born 1943)

- Леонид Ивашов
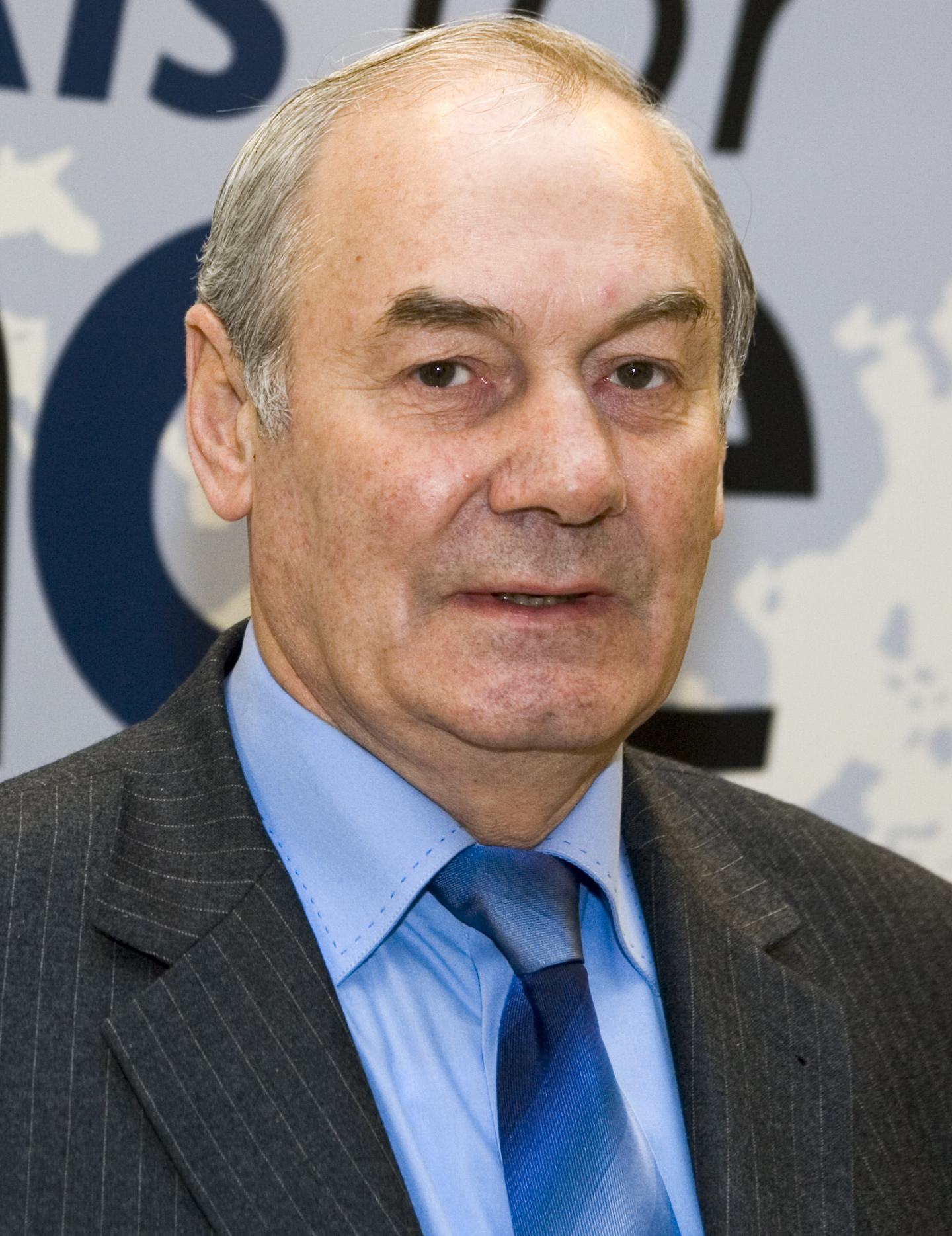
- Ivashov in 2005
- Born: 31 August 1943 (age 83); Frunze, Kirghiz SSR, Soviet Union (now Bishkek, Kyrgyzstan)
- Occupations: Colonel general, military expert
- Ivashov's voice Recorded 19 July 2011 during an interview for Echo of Moscow

Leonid Grigoryevich Ivashov (Russian: Леонид Григорьевич Ивашов; born 31 August 1943) is a Russian military and public official. He is a former President of the Academy for Geopolitical Problems and a retired colonel general.

In January 2022, as the head of the All-Russian Officers Assembly, he published a statement condemning Putin's "criminal policy of provoking a war" during the 2021–2022 Russo-Ukrainian crisis and calling for President Vladimir Putin's resignation.

== Biography ==
In 1964, Ivashov graduated from Tashkent Suvorov Military School and later in 1974 from the Frunze Military Academy. He was a platoon commander in the Soviet military forces that invaded Czechoslovakia to put down the Prague Spring in 1968.

Between 1976 and 1984, he worked as a senior aide to the Soviet Minister of Defense Dmitry Ustinov. In 1987 he became chief of the department for general affairs in the Soviet Union’s Ministry of Defense.

From 1996 to 2001, he was chief of the military cooperation department at the Russian Ministry of Defense. He was in charge of military co-operation between members of the Commonwealth of Independent States.

General Ivashov was one of the organizers of the march of Russian paratroopers to Pristina in 1999.

After his retirement in 2001, Ivashov wrote extensively on military affairs and geopolitics. Between 2004 and 2014, he was President of the Academy for Geopolitical Problems. After a year break he was reelected president of the Academy end of March 2015. He was reportedly involved in the Foundations of Geopolitics, a book by Aleksandr Dugin.

On December 5, 2011, he notified his intention to participate in the presidential race through self-nomination. But the Central Election Committee refused his nomination for administrative reasons.

In October 2016, Ivashov explained in Russian Channel One that Russia's engagement in the Syrian conflict was critical to prevent construction of the Qatar–Turkey pipeline, which would be catastrophic for Gazprom and, in turn, for the budget of the Russian Federation.

On 31 January 2022, during the prelude to the Russian invasion of Ukraine, as Chairman of the Russian Officers' General Assembly, Gen. Ivashov published a statement condemning Putin's "criminal policy of provoking a war" and calling for President Putin's resignation. Blaming Putin for risking "the final destruction of Russian statehood and the extermination of the indigenous population of the country" Ivashov stated that the real danger for Russia was not NATO or the West but "the unviability of the state model, the complete incapacity and lack of professionalism of the system of power and administration, the passivity and disorganization of society." Under these conditions "no country survives for long". According to Paul Roderick Gregory, "Ivashov believes that NATO is a hostile power, but his experience has taught him that the NATO/U.S. threat is under control and no external threat is imminent from the Western powers."

On 7 February 2022, Ivashov publicly called for Putin to resign over threats of a "criminal" invasion of Ukraine.
