= Dair Asanov =

Kyrgyz Soviet major general (1922–2009)

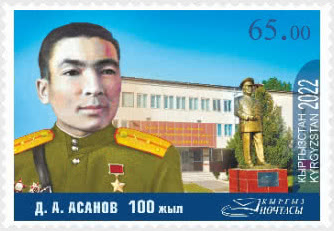
- Asanov on a 2022 stamp of Kyrgyzstan
- Born: 20 May 1922; Naryn Region, Russian SFSR (now Kyrgyzstan)
- Died: 18 September 2009 (aged 87); Bishkek, Kyrgyzstan
- Military career
- Allegiance: Soviet Union (1941–1984)
- Branch: Red Army (later Soviet Army)
- Service years: 1941–1984
- Rank: Major general
- Unit: 11th Breakthrough Artillery Division
- Conflicts: World War II
- Awards: Hero of the Soviet Union

Dair Asanovich Asanov (Kyrgyz: Дайыр Асанов; Russian: Даир Аса́нович Аса́нов; 20 May 1922 – 18 September 2009) was a Kyrgyz Soviet Army major general and a Hero of the Soviet Union.

== Biography ==
Asanov was born on 30 May 1922 in the Naryn oblast of the Kyrgyz SSR. Before enlisting in the army he worked as a teacher on a collective farm. He worked as a gunner of the 1208th Fighter Artillery Regiment. In January 1942, he was awarded for his actions when his gun direct fire ignited a tank of the Germans. He was awarded the title of Hero of the Soviet Union on 26 October 1943 for his heroic acts during World War II. After the war, Asanov graduated from the 1st Guards Ulyanovsk Tank School 1946, the Tashkent Higher Tank Command School in 1950, and the V.I. Lenin Political-Military Academy 1956. He worked as a commander commissariats in Tokmak, Chui, and the Leninsky district of the city of Frunze from 1961 to 1984. From 1985 to 1996 he was the director of the Kyrgyz State National Military Lyceum. In 1994, he retired with the rank of major general.

He died on 18 September 2009 in Bishkek at the age of 88. At the time of his death he was the last Hero of the Soviet Union from Kyrgyzstan.

== Legacy ==
The Kyrgyz State National Military Lyceum (which he commanded from 1985 to 1996) is named after Asanov. His wife Jamalbubu-Apa was awarded the Jubilee Medal "75 Years of Victory in the Great Patriotic War 1941–1945" in 2020.

== Awards ==
- Hero of the Soviet Union (Gold Star No. 2645)
- Order of Lenin
- Two Order of the Patriotic War, 1st class
- Two Order of the Red Star
- Order of the Badge of Honor
- Medal for Battle Merit (3)
