= Osavulivka =

Urban locality in Luhansk Oblast, Ukraine

Osavulivka Осавулівка
- Rural settlement
- Location of Osavulivka within Luhansk Oblast#Location of Osavulivka within Ukraine Osavulivka (Ukraine)
- Coordinates: 48°02′52″N 39°01′28″E
- Country: Ukraine
- Oblast: Luhansk Oblast
- Raion: Rovenky Raion
- Hromada: Antratsyt urban hromada
- Founded: 1777
- Elevation: 81 m (266 ft)

Population (2022)
  - Total: 1,412
- Time zone: UTC+2 (EET)
  - Summer (DST): UTC+3 (EEST)
- Postal code: 94685
- Area code: +380 6431

Osavulivka (Ukrainian: Осавулівка), formerly Yesaulivka (Єсаулівка), is a rural settlement in Antratsyt urban hromada, Rovenky Raion, Luhansk Oblast (region), Ukraine. Population: 1,412 (2022 estimate)

On 18 June 2025, the Verkhovna Rada renamed the rural settlement to Osavulivka to match Ukrainian language standards.

== Demographics ==
Native language distribution as of the Ukrainian Census of 2001:

- Ukrainian: 57.97%
- Russian: 41.97%
- Others 0.06%
