= Dubivskyi =

Urban locality in Luhansk Oblast, Ukraine

Dubivskyi Дубівський
- Rural settlement
- Interactive map of Dubivskyi
- Location of Dubivskyi within Luhansk Oblast#Location of Dubivskyi within Ukraine Dubivskyi (Ukraine)
- Coordinates: 48°04′56″N 39°09′25″E
- Country: Ukraine
- Oblast: Luhansk Oblast
- Raion: Rovenky Raion
- Hromada: Antratsyt urban hromada
- Founded: 1946
- Elevation: 186 m (610 ft)

Population (2022)
  - Total: 3,881
- Time zone: UTC+2 (EET)
  - Summer (DST): UTC+3 (EEST)
- Postal code: 94638
- Area code: +380 6431

Dubivskyi (Ukrainian: Дубівський) is a rural settlement in Antratsyt urban hromada, Rovenky Raion, Luhansk Oblast (region), Ukraine. Population: 3,881 (2022 estimate)

== Demographics ==
Native language distribution as of the Ukrainian Census of 2001:

- Ukrainian: 14.20%
- Russian: 85.54%
- Others 0.18%
