= 1972 October Revolution Parade =

55th anniversary October Revolution Parad organized in 1972

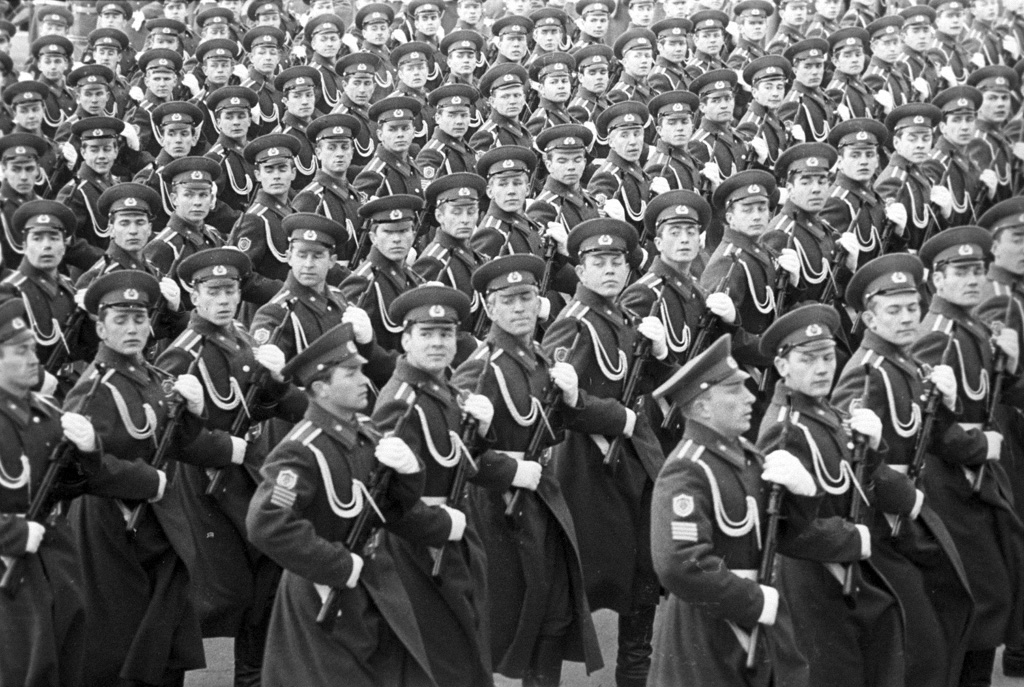
Cadets of the KGB Moscow Higher Frontier Guards Command Academy during the parade.

The 1972 October Revolution Parade was held in commemoration of the 55th anniversary of the 1917 October Revolution and the 50th anniversary of the founding of the Soviet Union in 1922. Notable attendees were Soviet General Secretary Leonid Brezhnev and Soviet Prime Minister Nikolai Podgorny. The parade's commander was Colonel General Vladimir Govorov, the Commander of Troops of the Moscow Military District, while its presiding officer was Marshal of the Soviet Union Andrei Grechko.

== Overview ==
It was the 100th Soviet military parade to be held on Red Square. The parade's de facto motto was "On Red Square under the Red Banner". Both active personnel and veterans participated in the march, with participants from various republics including Ukrainians, Moldovans, Lithuanians, Armenians and Kazakhs. Revolution Day was also celebrated in Leningrad with a military parade on Palace Square, inspected by the commander of the Leningrad Military District, Lieutenant General Ivan Shavrov. Participants received commemorative badges and special thanks Colonel General Govorov and members of the District Military Council. The badge is a gilded eight-pointed star with faceted beams, with a circle formed by the ribbon of the Order of Lenin in the center of the star. The silhouette of a modern tank is depicted in the background and in the upper right corner, there is the inscription “100th parade”. On November 3, 2007, graduates of the Kalinin (now Tver) Suvorov Military and Nakhimov Naval Schools who participated in the 100th military parade gathered for the first time on Red Square on the occasion o the parade's 35th anniversary.

== Parade Units ==
=== Massed Bands ===
- Military Bands of the Moscow Garrison under Major General Nikolai Nazarov.
- Corps of Drums of the Moscow Military Music School

=== Ground Column ===
- Parade commander holding the appointment of commanding officer of the Moscow Military District
- Frunze Military Academy
- V.I. Lenin Military Political Academy
- Felix Dzerzhinsky Artillery Academy
- Military Armored Forces Academy Marshal Rodion Malinovsky
- Military Engineering Academy
- Military Academy of Chemical Defense and Control
- Yuri Gagarin Air Force Academy
- Prof. Nikolai Zhukovsky Air Force Engineering Academy
- Black Sea Higher Naval School
- 98th Guards Airborne Division
- Moscow Border Guards Institute of the Border Defence Forces of the KGB "Moscow City Council"
- Separate Operational Purpose Division
- 336th Marine Brigade of the Baltic Fleet
- Suvorov Military School
- Leningrad Nakhimov Naval School
- Moscow Military Combined Arms Command Training School "Supreme Soviet of the Russian SFSR"

=== Mobile Column ===
The parade's mobile column exhibited military equipment, prominently including Katyusha rocket launchers.
