= Yasenivskyi =

Urban locality in Luhansk Oblast, Ukraine

Yasenivskyi Ясенівський
- Rural settlement
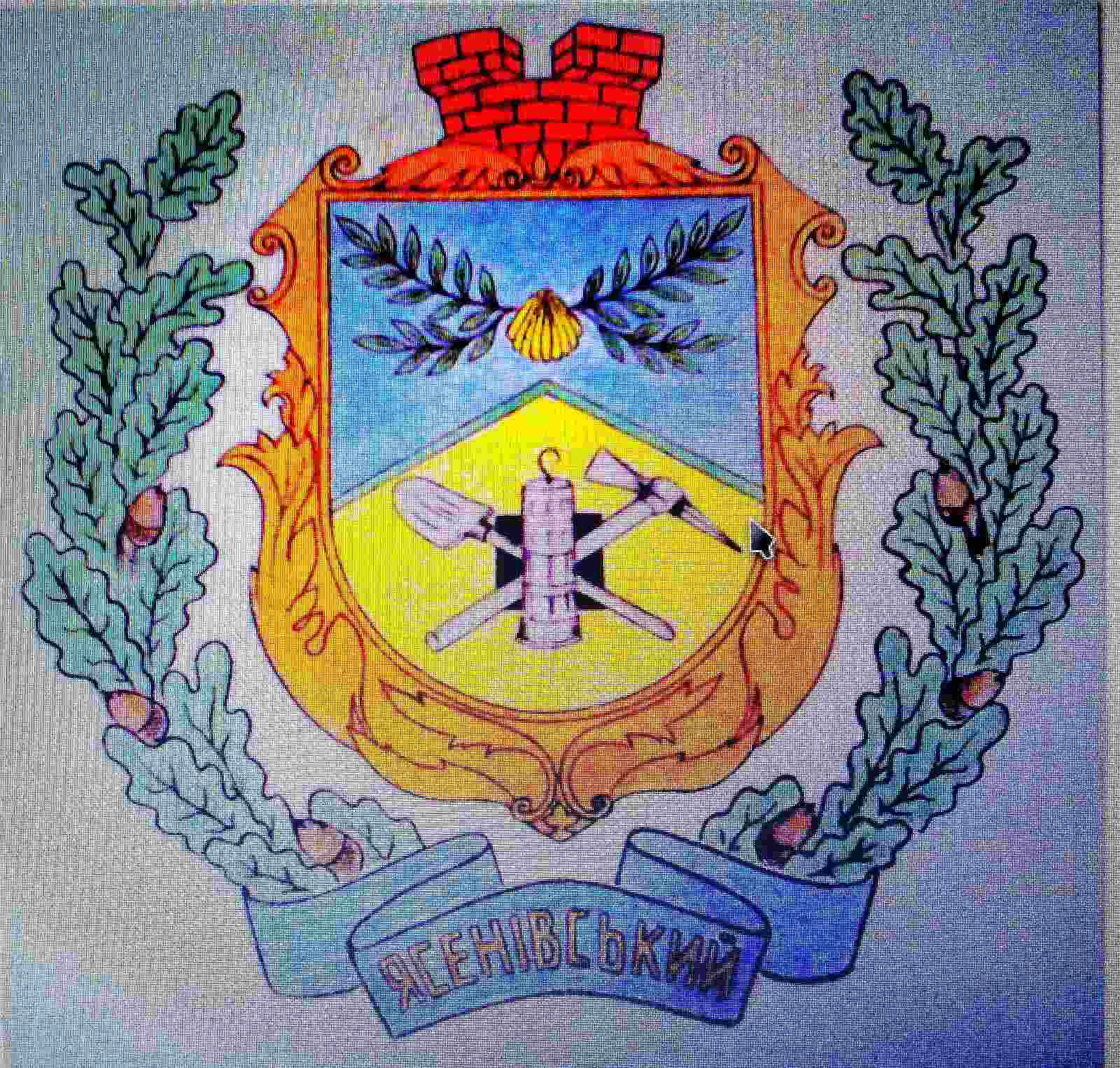
- Coat of arms

- Location of Yasenivskyi Yasenivskyi (Ukraine)
- Coordinates: 48°09′38″N 39°13′03″E
- Country: Ukraine
- Oblast: Luhansk Oblast
- Raion: Rovenky Raion
- Hromada: Antratsyt urban hromada
- Elevation: 283 m (928 ft)

Population (2022)
  - Total: 8,943
- Postal code: 94782
- Area code: +380 6433

Yasenivskyi (Ukrainian: Ясенівський; Russian: Ясеновский) is a rural settlement in Antratsyt urban hromada, Rovenky Raion, Luhansk Oblast (region), Ukraine. Population: 8,943 (2022 estimate)
