= Ussuriysk Suvorov Military School =

- Emblem of the school
- Active: 1943–present
- Country: Soviet Union; Russia
- Type: Suvorov Military School
- Location: Ussuriysk

Commanders
- Chief: Major General of the reserve Nikolay Glinin
- Notable commanders: Georgy Ivanishchev

The Ussuriysk Suvorov Military School (Russian: Уссурийское суворовское военное училище, USVU) is a secondary educational military boarding school of the Russian Ministry of Defense. Located in Ussuriysk, Primorsky Krai, the Suvorov Military School was established as the Kursk Suvorov Military School in 1943, moving to its current location in 1957, and was named the Far Eastern Suvorov Military School from then until 1964.

== History ==
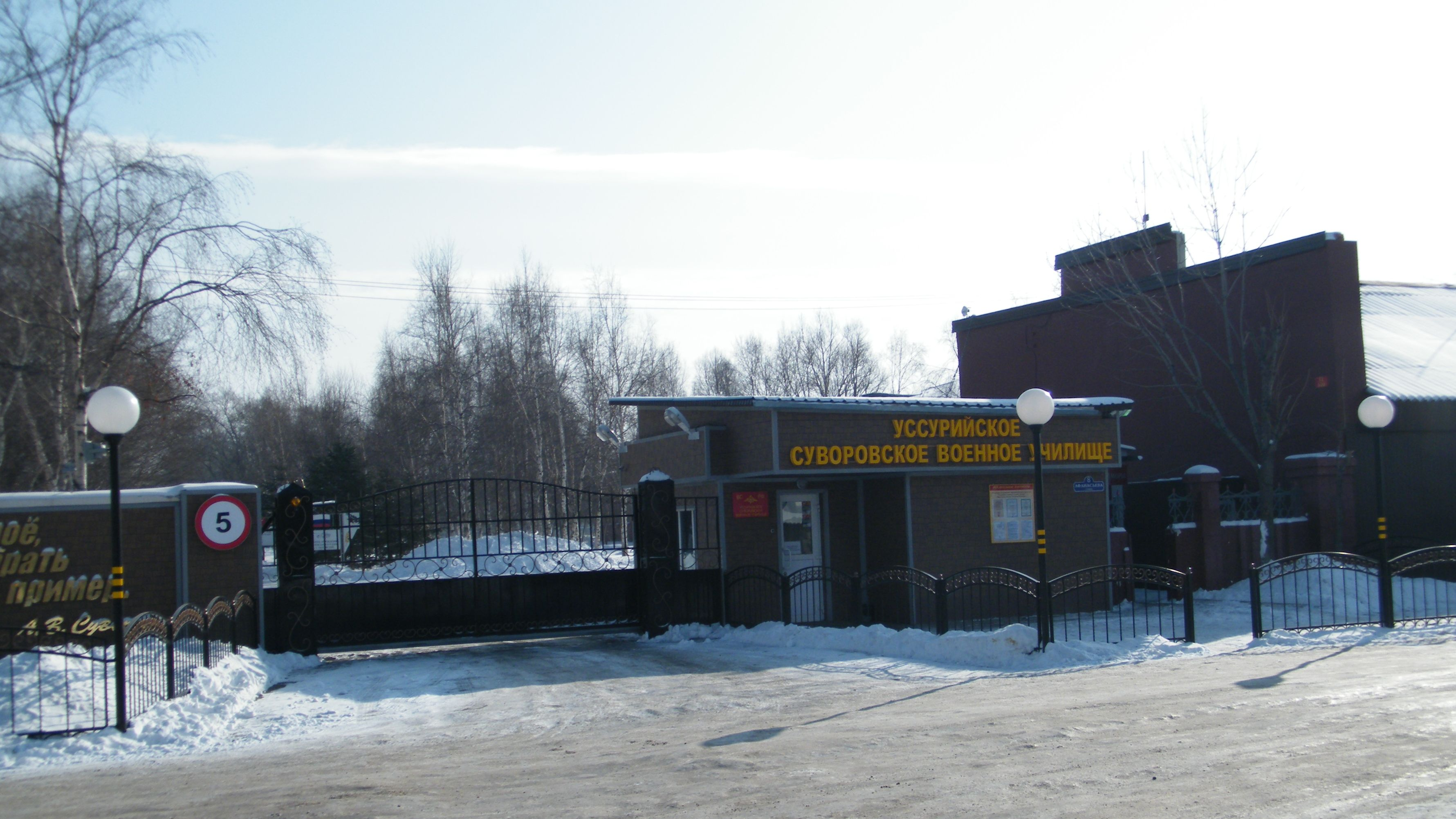
Main gate of the school

The school was formed as the Kursk Suvorov Military School in connection with the creation of nine Suvorov Military Schools in territory liberated from German occupation and finished its formation by 1 December 1943, part of the Oryol Military District. 1 December, the day the school opened, is celebrated as the school anniversary. The school accepted 504 cadets for its first class, including 222 from Kursk, 135 from Moscow, 60 from Tula, and 64 from Ryazan oblasts. In September 1945 the school accepted 53 more cadets, including ten from Yugoslavia, and another 50 in August 1946 enrolled in the senior preparatory class. Local authorities furnished three buildings and additional grounds for the school depot and gym, located in different parts of the city. The buildings were in need of major repairs. The first graduation took place in 1948, with 38 cadets. From its creation to 1957 the school trained cadets on a seven-year program. In August 1954 a new complex was built for the school on Skornyakhovskoy street, to which the school moved in 1956.

In April 1957 the school was ordered to relocate to the Far East. The 303 cadets, as well as officers, starshinas, instructors and their families, boarded trains to depart Kursk on 25 July and arrived in Voroshilov (renamed Ussuriysk) on 11 August. The school was located in the Yuzhny (southern) district of the city on grounds of 40 hectares. The school was renamed the Far Eastern Suvorov Suvorov Military School on 1 December.

Between 1957 and 1964 the training program was increased to eight years. The school was renamed the Ussuriysk Suvorov Military School in 1964. The training program was reduced to three years in 1965 and then to two years in 1970. After the collapse of the Soviet Union the school training program increased to three years in 1993, and in 2008 returned to the seven-year format. Since then, the school accepts boys aged ten to eleven who complete primary school. The 2023 graduation class included 65 cadets.

A major renovation of the school and its summer field camp was carried out during 2015 and 2016. An avenue of glory with the names of graduates killed in action was opened in 2015, including busts of Heroes of the Soviet Union and Heroes of Russia who graduated from the school. A track was added to the school in 2018, followed by an ice rink and chapel in 2020.

For its "merits in training military personnel," the school was awarded the honorary certificate of the Supreme Commander-in-Chief of the Russian Armed Forces on 1 December 2018. By 2018, more than 12,000 students had graduated from the school.

== Chiefs ==
- Major General Viktor Kozyrev (1943–1946)
- Major General Zinovy Alekseyev (1946–1951)
- Major General Nikolay Alekseyev (1951–1958)
- Major General Georgy Ivanishchev (1958–1964)
- Major General Nikolay Zharenov (1964–1968)
- Major General Pavel Chernenok (1968–1971)
- Major General Vladimir Sarvir (1971–1975)
- Major General Aleksandr Pirozhenko (1975–1985)
- Major General Valery Skoblov (1985–1991)
- Major General Aleksandr Minenko (1991–2008)
- Lieutenant Colonel Mikhail Shlyakhtov (acting, 2008–2009)
- Major General Sergey Kochan (2009–2010)
- Colonel Anatoly Retsoy (2010–2020)
- Major General of the reserve Nikolay Glinin (2020–present)
