= Kripenskyi =

Urban locality in Luhansk Oblast, Ukraine

Kripenskyi Кріпенський
- Rural settlement
- Location of Kripenskyi within Luhansk Oblast#Location of Kripenskyi within Ukraine Kripenskyi (Ukraine)
- Coordinates: 48°06′55″N 39°00′58″E
- Country: Ukraine
- Oblast: Luhansk Oblast
- Raion: Rovenky Raion
- Hromada: Antratsyt urban hromada
- Founded: 1777
- Elevation: 186 m (610 ft)

Population (2022)
  - Total: 6,713
- Time zone: UTC+2 (EET)
  - Summer (DST): UTC+3 (EEST)
- Postal code: 94635
- Area code: +380 6431

Kripenskyi (Ukrainian: Кріпенський) is a rural settlement in Antratsyt urban hromada, Rovenky Raion, Luhansk Oblast (region), Ukraine. Population: 6,713 (2022 estimate)

== Demographics ==
Native language distribution as of the Ukrainian Census of 2001:

- Ukrainian: 23.94%
- Russian: 75.72%
- Others 0.09%
