= Antratsyt urban hromada =

Antratsyt urban hromada Антрацитівська міська громада
- Hromada
- Interactive map of Antratsyt urban hromada
- Country: Ukraine
- Oblast: Luhansk
- Raion: Rovenky
- Settlements: 26
- Cities: 1
- Villages: 16
- Towns: 9

Antratsyt urban hromada (Ukrainian: Антрацитівська міська громада) is a hromada of Ukraine, located in Rovenky Raion, Luhansk Oblast. Its administrative center is the city Antratsyt.

The hromada contains 26 settlements: 1 city (Antratsyt), 9 rural settlements:

- Bokovo-Platove
- Verkhnii Naholchyk
- Dubivskyi
- Osavulivka
- Kamiane
- Kripenskyi
- Nizhnii Naholchyk
- Shchotove
- Yasenivskyi

And 16 villages:

- Diakove
- Zelenyi Kurhan
- Zelenodilske
- Illinka
- Kovpakove
- Leonove
- Leskyne
- Lisne
- Lobivski Kopalni
- Melnykove
- Orikhove
- Rafailivka
- Sadovyi
- Stepove
- Khrystoforivka
- Chervona Poliana

== See also ==
- List of hromadas of Ukraine
