= Kyrgyz State National Military Lyceum =

Kyrgyz State National Military Lyceum named after Hero of the Soviet Union Major General Dair Asanov
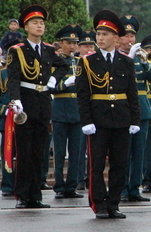
- A director's aide (right) and a fanfare trumpetist from the lyceum with the Band of the General Staff during a 2015 victory day parade on Ala-Too Square.
- Bishkek, Chuy Region; Kyrgyzstan

Information
- School type: military preparatory School
- Opened: 6 May 1994; 31 years ago
- Commandant: Dakir Uzbekov
- Grades: 9 to 12
- Gender: All male
- Enrollment: 3,000 (since its establishment)
- Colors: Black and Red
- Accreditation: Ministry of Education

The Kyrgyz State National Military Lyceum (KSNML) (Kyrgyz: Кыргыз Улуттук Аскер Лицейи; Russian: Кыргызский Национальный Военный Лицей), also known as the Suvorov School is a military boarding school in the Kyrgyz Republic that is subordinated to the General Staff of the Armed Forces of Kyrgyzstan. It trains middle-tier commanders in the Armed Forces of the Kyrgyz Republic.

== History ==
In 1983, the Republican Special Boarding School (Commonly known as the "Suvorov School") named in honor of the 60th anniversary of the Communist Party of Kirghizia was established. In July 1991, the Cabinet of Ministers of the USSR signed an order making the school into the Bishkek Suvorov Military School along with another school In Ulyanovsk. Although the school in Ulyanovsk was created, the Bishkek school was not created due to the collapse of the USSR. The Kyrgyz State National Military Lyceum was established by decree of President Askar Akayev on 6 May 1994 on the basis of the Suvorov School. In 2005, the lyceum was renamed after Hero of the Soviet Union, Major General Dair Asanov. On 16 January 2006, a government decree was signed, according to which the lyceum switched its subordination from the Ministry of Education, Science and Youth Policy to the Ministry of Defense. More than 500 of the high school's graduates ended up in high positions in the Ministry of Defense, and the Kyrgyz Frontier Force. In 2017, admission to the lyceum was canceled in an initiative that was approved as part of the reform of the Armed Forces. Significant changes to the lyceum that came as a result included the introduction of the position of a child psychologist and the revision of the payment system for teachers. The following year, they began accepting children with a ninth grade who couldn't become lyceum students the year before.

== Student life ==
The General Staff described the lyceum's duties with the following statement:

"Lyceum graduates are no different from graduates of ordinary schools, at the same time, their behavior is more disciplined and collected, and instead of traditional costumes, there is a festive military uniform. They spent three years of their life within the walls of an educational institution."

=== Controversies ===
In August 2016, 69 cadets from the military lyceum fled from rehearsals of an Independence Day parade due to be held later that month on Ala-Too Square after a conflict arose over the fact that cadets had little time to rest. Kyrgyz human rights activists suggested that the cadets could have been subjected to violence, which caused the escape. In September 2019, 56 students aged between 16-17 escaped from the lyceum's premises after they refused to fulfill the physical training standards and began to insist that "more gentle loads be applied to them as old people", which was rejected by their commanders. Upon their return to campus, the 56 cadets apologized and were disciplined.

== International cooperation ==
Graduates of the lyceum will often end up being trained in professional military institutions in Russia, Turkey, Germany, India, Kazakhstan, the United States, and Azerbaijan. In October 2018, the memorandum of understanding between lyceum and the Indian National Cadet Corps, providing cooperation in matters of vocational guidance. The following year, cadets of the lyceum spent two weeks in New Delhi as guests at the Delhi Republic Day parade.

== Heads ==
- Dair Asanov (1985-1996)
- Colonel Ravshan Abdullayev (27 January 2015 – 22 February 2018)
- Dakir Uzbekov (22 February 2018 – present)

== Alumni ==
- Almaz Dzhumakeev, Commander of the Kazakh Air Assault Forces from October 2015 to April 2018.

== See also ==
- Mastibek Tashmukhamedov Military Lyceum of the Ministry of Defense of Tajikistan
- Astana Zhas Ulan Republican School
- Jamshid Nakhchivanski Military Lyceum
- Berdimuhamed Annayev 1st Specialized Military School
