= Perevalny =

Perevalny (Russian: Перевальный; masculine), Perevalnaya (Перевальная; feminine), or Perevalnoye (Перевальное; neuter) is the name of several rural localities in Russia.

== Modern localities ==
- Perevalny, Stavropol Krai, a khutor in Perevalnensky Selsoviet of Mineralovodsky District in Stavropol Krai
- Perevalnoye, Republic of Crimea, a selo in Simferopolsky District of the Republic of Crimea
- Perevalnoye, Voronezh Oblast, a selo in Perevalenskoye Rural Settlement of Podgorensky District in Voronezh Oblast

== Alternative names ==
- Perevalny or Perevalnoye, alternative names of Perevalka, a settlement under the administrative jurisdiction of Psebaysky Settlement Okrug in Mostovsky District of Krasnodar Krai; 44°3′N 40°46′E
