= Kamiane, Luhansk Oblast =

Urban locality in Luhansk Oblast, Ukraine

Kamiane Кам'яне
- Rural settlement
- Location of Kamiane within Luhansk Oblast#Location of Kamiane within Ukraine Kamiane (Ukraine)
- Coordinates: 48°09′35″N 39°09′50″E
- Country: Ukraine
- Oblast: Luhansk Oblast
- Raion: Rovenky Raion
- Hromada: Antratsyt urban hromada
- Founded: 1787
- Elevation: 289 m (948 ft)

Population (2022)
  - Total: 2,658
- Time zone: UTC+2 (EET)
  - Summer (DST): UTC+3 (EEST)
- Postal code: 94624
- Area code: +380 6431

Kamiane (Ukrainian: Кам'яне) is a rural settlement in Antratsyt urban hromada, Rovenky Raion, Luhansk Oblast (region), Ukraine. Population: 2,658 (2022 estimate) It formerly belonged to Antratsyt Raion.

== Demographics ==
Native language distribution as of the Ukrainian Census of 2001:

- Ukrainian: 12.93%
- Russian: 87.01%
- Others 0.03%

== Economy ==
Two coal mines are located in the settlement.
