= Bokovo-Platove =

Urban locality in Luhansk Oblast, Ukraine

Bokovo-Platove Боково-Платове
- Rural settlement
- Location of Bokovo-Platove within Luhansk Oblast#Location of Bokovo-Platove within Ukraine Bokovo-Platove (Ukraine)
- Coordinates: 48°06′52″N 39°01′27″E
- Country: Ukraine
- Oblast: Luhansk Oblast
- Raion: Rovenky Raion
- Hromada: Antratsyt urban hromada
- Founded: 1796
- Elevation: 134 m (440 ft)

Population (2022)
  - Total: 2,605
- Time zone: UTC+2 (EET)
  - Summer (DST): UTC+3 (EEST)
- Postal code: 94626
- Area code: +380 6431

Bokovo-Platove (Ukrainian: Боково-Платове) is a rural settlement in Antratsyt urban hromada, Rovenky Raion, Luhansk Oblast (region), Ukraine. Population: 2,605 (2022 estimate)

== Demographics ==
Native language distribution as of the Ukrainian Census of 2001:

- Ukrainian: 13.87%
- Russian: 86.27%
- Others 0.12%
