= Mastibek Tashmukhamedov =

Major General Mastibek Tashmukhamedov
- Мастибек Тошмуҳаммадов
- Born: December 24, 1908; Gorno-Badakhshan, Emirate of Bukhara, Russian Empire
- Died: November 22, 1988 (age 79); Dushanbe, Tajik SSR, Soviet Union
- Military career
- Allegiance: USSR
- Service years: 1935–1970
- Rank: Major General
- Conflicts: World War II; Eastern Front

Mastibek Davlyatovich Tashmukhamedov (Tajik: Мастибек Тошмуҳаммадов; Russian: Мастибе́к Давля́тович Ташмухаме́дов, December 24, 1908 – November 22, 1988) was a Soviet military and political leader, who was the first Red Army general to be appointed from Tajikistan.

== Early life and career ==
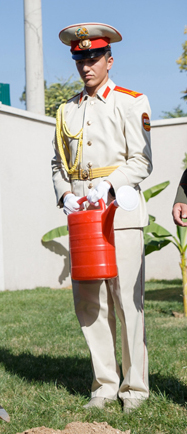
A cadet of the Tashmukhamedov Military Lyceum of the Ministry of Defense.

Tashmukhamedov was born on December 24, 1908, in the village of Porshnev (now Shugnansky District, Gorno-Badakhshan) in Emirate of Bukhara. In 1929, he was appointed secretary of the Kangurt District Committee of the Komsomol of Kulob. From 1932 to 1934, he was the First Secretary of the national Komsomol of Tajikistan. In August 1941, in connection with the outbreak of the Great Patriotic War, he served on the war front and commanded the education department of the 389th Rifle Division. From April 1943 until the end of the war, he served as deputy commander of the division's 545th Infantry Regiment for political units, effectively a political commissar.

After the war, he served in the ranks of the Turkestan Military District, graduating from the military institute in Ashgabat in 1949. In 1945, Tashmukhamedov was appointed as the commander of a regiment in the Ashgabat Commissariat of the Turkmen SSR. He also graduated from the Lenin Military-Political Academy in 1957. That year, he was rehabilitated and removed and in January of the same year, Minister of Defense Rodion Malinovsky appointed him as military commissar of Tajikistan, a position he would work in for 14 years until he retired. In 1962, he was awarded the rank of Major General. From 1957 to 1963, he was a member of the Central Committee of the Communist Party of Tajikistan as well as a deputy of the Supreme Soviet of the Tajik SSR from 1957 to 1971. In 1983, he was the only delegate from the Central Asian republics at a meeting with the General Secretary Yuri Andropov and the Soviet leadership. In 1970, Tashmukhamedov retired, and died on November 22, 1988, in the Tajik capital.

== Legacy ==
The Mastibek Tashmukhamedov Military Lyceum of the Ministry of Defense of Tajikistan is named after Tashmukhamedov. In 2008, in honor of the 100th anniversary of the birth of Tashmukhamedov, a bust was unveiled at the lyceum.

== Personal life ==
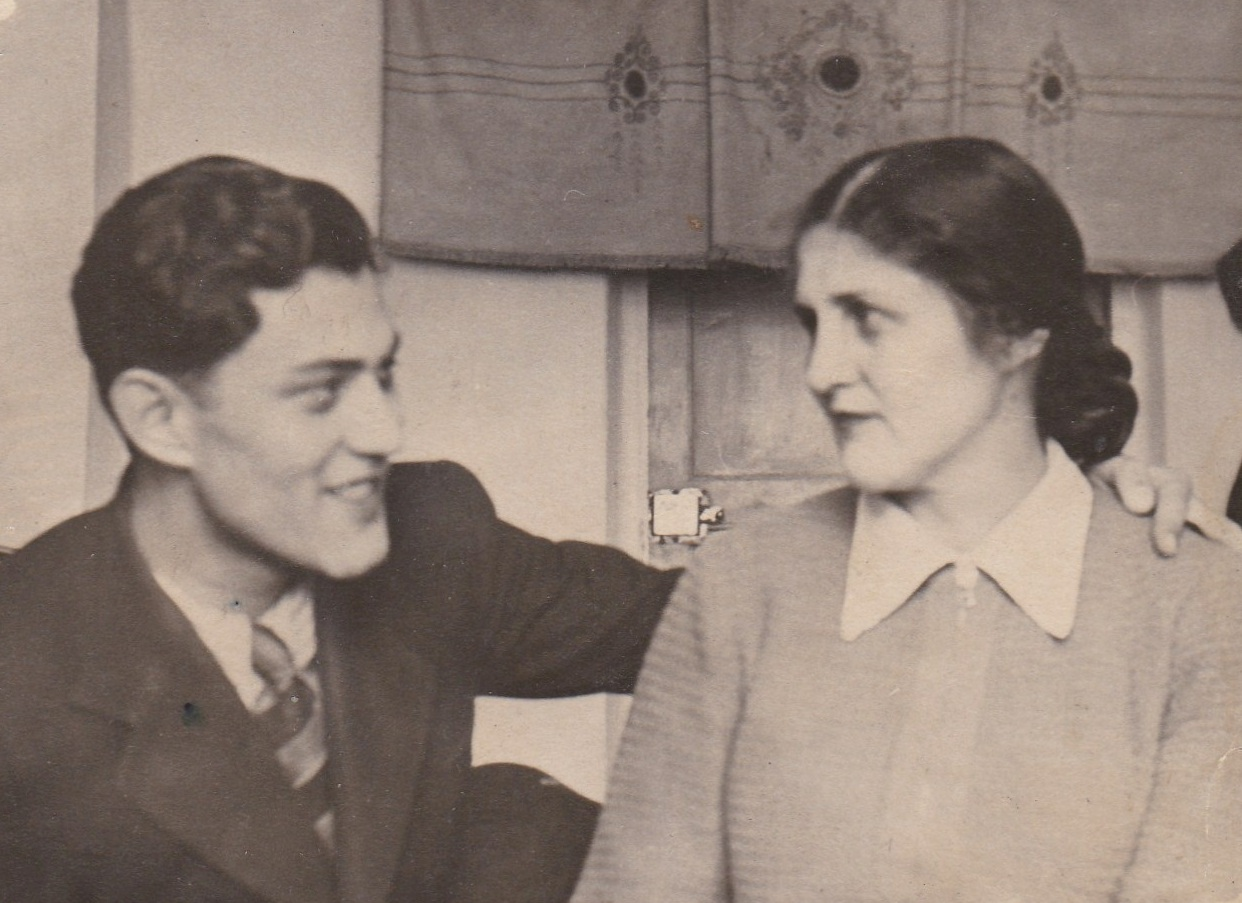
Nisso Nazarova and Felix Tashmukhamedov.

The first wife of Mastibek was Ozodakhonim "Nisso" Nazarova (Озода Абдулназаровна Ташмухамедова). She became the prototype of the image of Nisso in the novel of the same name by Pavel Luknitsky, whom Ozodakhonim met in Leningrad. Cult films based on the novel "Nisso" were filmed by directors Marat Aripov and Davlat Khudonazarov. By the time Tashmukhamedov met Ozodakhonim, she had already had a son named Felix from a previous marriage, whom he adopted. Felix Tashmukhamedov was the longtime director of the Mayakovsky Russian Drama Theater in Dushanbe. After the dissolution of the Soviet Union, he lived in Russia and Israel, dying in the latter in early 2018.

In the mid-1930s, Mastibek married Margo Mamlezade, a Lezginka by nationality, with whom he had another son, Ulugbek. During the 1948 Ashgabat earthquake, Ulugbek died when a wall collapsed on him in front of Mastibek and Margo. Upon return to Tajikistan, She and Margo adopted two-year-old Akhmadbek, the son of Mastibek's younger brother, Davlatbek.

== Awards ==
- 2 orders of the Red Banner
- 3 Orders of the Patriotic War of the 1st and 2nd degrees
- 3 Order of the Red Star
- The Order of the Badge of Honor
- Medal of Honor"
- Medal "For Military Merit"
- Honored Worker of Culture of Tajikistan
