= Verkhnii Naholchyk =

Urban locality in Luhansk Oblast, Ukraine

Verkhnii Naholchyk Верхній Нагольчик
- Rural settlement
- Location of Verkhnii Naholchyk within Luhansk Oblast#Location of Verkhnii Naholchyk within Ukraine Verkhnii Naholchyk (Ukraine)
- Coordinates: 48°4′57″N 39°5′30″E
- Country: Ukraine
- Oblast: Luhansk Oblast
- Raion: Rovenky Raion
- Hromada: Antratsyt urban hromada
- Elevation: 180 m (590 ft)

Population (2022)
  - Total: 1,706
- Time zone: UTC+2 (EET)
  - Summer (DST): UTC+3 (EEST)
- Postal code: 94631
- Area code: +380 6431

Verkhnii Naholchyk (Ukrainian: Верхній Нагольчик) is a rural settlement in Antratsyt urban hromada, Rovenky Raion, Luhansk Oblast (region), Ukraine. Population: 1,706 (2022 estimate)

== Demographics ==
Native language distribution as of the Ukrainian Census of 2001:

- Ukrainian: 46.74%
- Russian: 53.07%
- Others 0.05%
