= Tashkent Suvorov Military School =

Former military academy in Uzbek SSR (1943–60)

- Uzbek: Toshkent Suvorov Harbiy Maktabi; Russian: Ташкент Суворовское военное училище
- Emblem of the Uzbek SSR
- Other names: TshSVU
- Type: military academy
- Active: 1943–1960
- Founders: Government of the Uzbek SSR
- Affiliations: Ministry of Internal Affairs
- Academic affiliations: Suvorov Military School
- Location: 33 Stalin Street, Tashkent, Uzbek SSR, Soviet Union
- Language: Russian, Uzbek
- At the time, it was the only active Suvorov Military School in Central Asia.

The Tashkent Suvorov Military School (TshSVU) (Uzbek: Toshkent Suvorov Harbiy Maktabi; Russian: Ташкент Суворовское военное училище) was a Suvorov Military Academy in the Uzbek SSR and one of such other schools in the former Soviet Union for military cadets. It was designed on the basis of training young adults from ages 14–18 and educating them to be prepared for admission to higher education institutions and to further their knowledge and career in the Armed Forces of the Soviet Union The TshSVU was in existence from 1943 to 1960. It was under the direct command of the Soviet Ministry of Internal Affairs.

== History ==
In August 1943, the Council of People's Commissars of the USSR offered to open Suvorov military schools in Kutaisi and Tashkent. on September 4, the Government passed a resolution on the establishment of both schools. On September 27, 1943, the academy was officially established. The school was located on 33 Stalin street in Tashkent. The opening ceremony of the school was on December 1. The first graduates of the school appeared in 1945. The TshSVU was dissolved on September 19, 1960.

The following served as heads of the school since 1943:

- Major General Fyodor Mayorov (1943–1945)
- Colonel V. Andreyev (1945–1950)
- Colonel P. Yuhnovets (1950–1951)
- Colonel N. Gnedenkov (1951–1957)
- Colonel N. Sovetov (1957–1960)

== Alumni ==
- Valeri Popenchenko - Russian amateur boxer
- Vladimir Dzhanibekov - Soviet cosmonaut
- Yevgeny Sigarov - Honored Worker of Culture of Russia
