= Perevalnoye, Voronezh Oblast =

Perevalnoye Перевальное
- Selo
- Location within Voronezh Oblast Location within Russia
- Coordinates: 50°32′N 39°30′E
- Country: Russia
- Region: Voronezh Oblast
- District: Podgorensky District
- Time zone: UTC+3:00

Perevalnoye (Russian: Перева́льное) is a rural locality (a selo) in Perevalenskoye Rural Settlement, Podgorensky District, Voronezh Oblast, Russia. The population was 384 as of 2010. There are 8 streets.

== Geography ==
Perevalnoye is located 23 km northwest of Podgorensky (the district's administrative centre) by road. Goncharovka is the nearest rural locality.
