= Mastibek Tashmukhamedov Military Lyceum of the Ministry of Defense of Tajikistan =

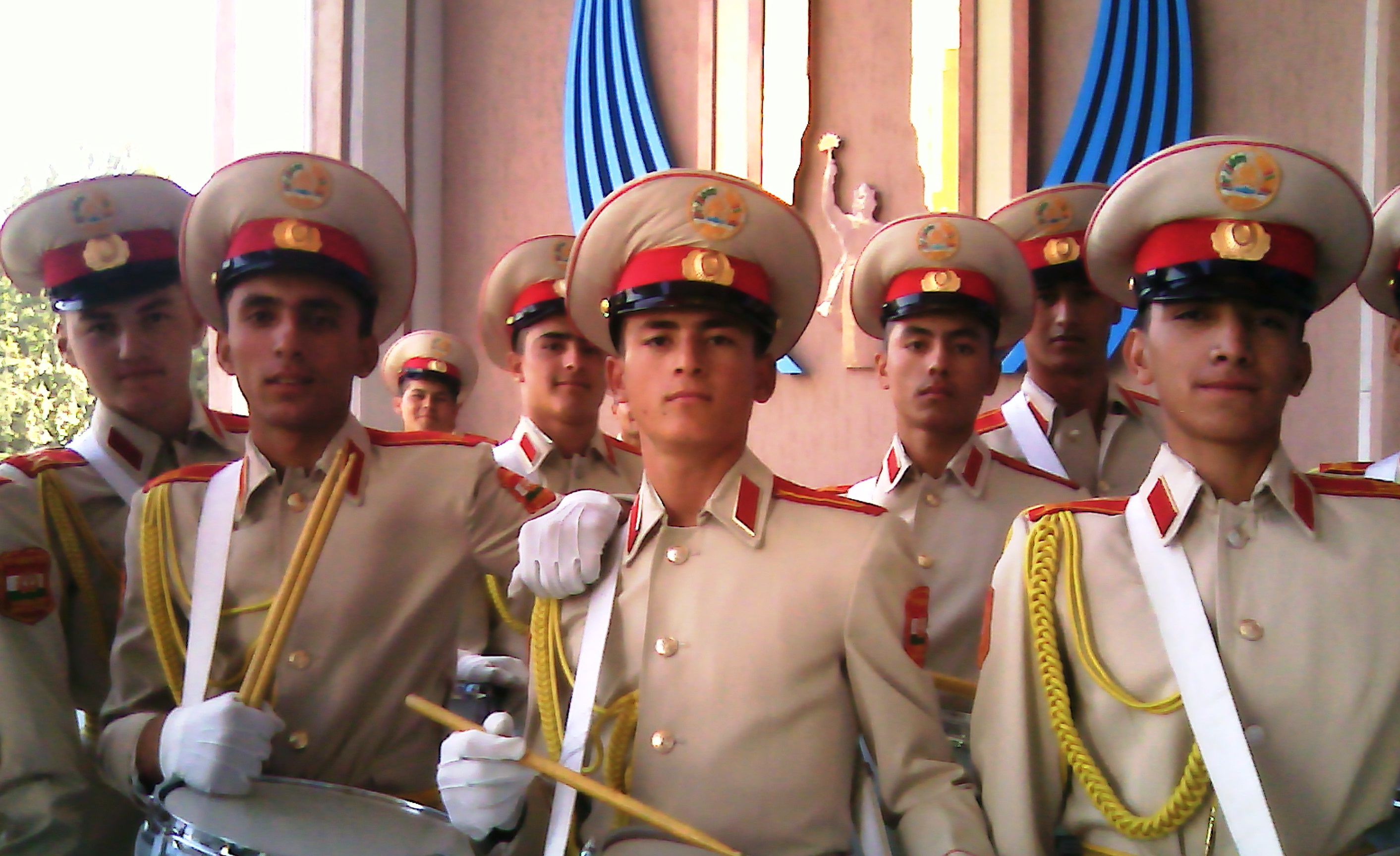
- Members of the corps of drums of the Military Lyceum
- Dushanbe; Tajikistan

Information
- Other name: Suvorov School
- Former name: Special Republican Boarding School
- School type: Military preparatory school
- Opened: 29 September 1985; 40 years ago
- Grades: 9 to 12
- Gender: All male
- Enrollment: 1,801 (since its establishment)
- Colors: White and red
- Accreditation: Ministry of Defence (Tajikistan)

Mastibek Tashmukhamedov Military Lyceum of the Ministry of Defense of Tajikistan (Tajik: Литсейи ҳарбии Вазорати мудофиаи Тоҷикистон ба номи Мастибек Ташмухамедов) is a higher military educational institution in the national education system of the Armed Forces of the Republic of Tajikistan. The lyceum is similar to Suvorov Military Schools in Russia and Belarus.

== History ==
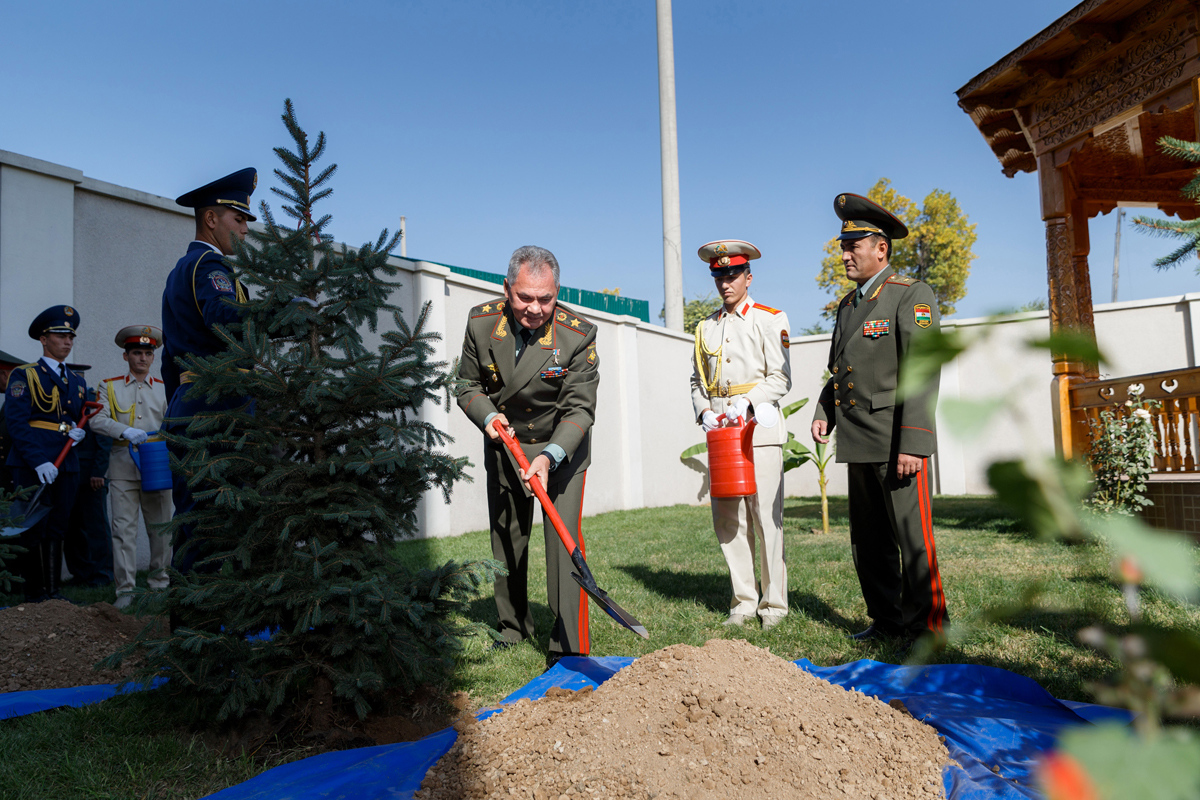
Russian Defense Minister Sergei Shoigu with cadets of the lyceum.

The Military Lyceum of the Defense Ministry was established on February 4, 1999, on the basis of the Special Republican Boarding School (Commonly known as the "Suvorov School" due to its similarities to the Suvorov Military School), which was established on September 29, 1985. The first reactor of the military lyceum was Major General Mirzo Jonov. At the time of its founding in 1985, 80 pupils were enrolled in the school, with thousands of people coming from the Russian, Ukrainian, Uzbek, Azerbaijani, and Lithuanian SSR's. In 1999, the Special Republican Boarding School was renamed in honor of Mastibek Tashmukhamedov. It has been under the control of the Tajik Defence Ministry since 2003, and since 1999, school has had over 1801 pupils.

== Aspects ==
The lyceum building has a conference hall, educational classrooms, sports halls, amusement parks and a library of over 4 thousand books. In October 2014, the Russian 201st Military Base donated more than 600 textbooks to the lyceum as a gift. In previous years, cadets have visited the base on open days and sports competitions. 400 young men between the ages of 14 and 16 are trained at the military lyceum every school year. After graduation, they go to Russian universities, then replenish the officer corps of the Ministry of Defense.

In 2008, in honor of the 100th anniversary of the birth of Tashmukhamedov, a bust was unveiled at the lyceum. Tokhir Khayrulloyev, the son of former defense minister Sherali Khayrulloyev, is a graduate of the school.
