= Moscow Border Institute of the FSB of the Russian Federation =

Coordinates: 55°52′43″N 37°40′28″E

- Московский пограничный институт ФСБ России
- Official Flag of the Border Troops
- Former names: KGB Moscow Higher Frontier Guards Command Academy
- Type: military academy
- Established: February 4, 1932
- Officer in charge: Major General Valery Kozlov
- Location: Moscow, Russia

The Moscow Border Institute of the FSB of the Russian Federation "Moscow City Council" carries out training for officers of the Border Service of the Federal Security Service of the Russian Federation.

== History ==
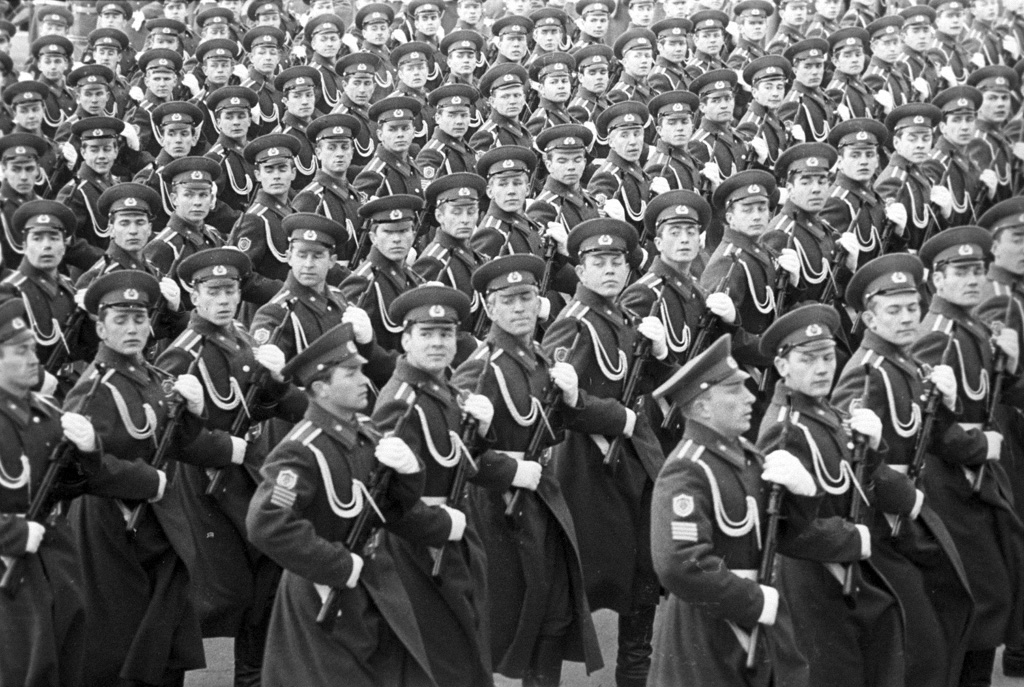
Cadets of the academy during the 1972 October Revolution Parade.

On February 4, 1932, the Third School of Frontier Guard and OGPU troops was formed. During the Second World War, the school issued 837 cadets and listeners ahead of schedule. In February 1945, the cadets of the school took part in the security of the Yalta Conference. 9 cadets of the school were awarded the title of Hero of the Soviet Union. On June 24, 1945, personnel of the school made their first appearance in the Moscow Victory Parade of 1945, and have been taking part in military parades on Red Square since then. In 1953, the school was renamed the Moscow Border Military School of the Ministry of Internal Affairs. On April 3, 1957, it was renamed to the Moscow Border Military School of the KGB under the Council of Ministers. In 1967, the school was awarded the Order of the Red Banner and on July 7, 1977, the school was given the honorary name of the Moscow City Council for its work in training officers from the national capital. In 1979, the post-graduate school for scientific and pedagogical personnel was opened at the school. In the 80s, school graduates were immediately sent to Afghanistan to serve during the Soviet–Afghan War.

=== Post-Soviet era ===
On 8 May 1992, by order of the federal government, it was transformed into the Higher Border School and was redesigned to train officers in law, with a period of training lasting for five years. On May 25, 1992, it was renamed to include the Order of the October Revolution and the Order of the Red Banner in its title. In June 1992, a special faculty was expelled from the staff of the school. In 1993, the school was transformed into the Moscow Military Institute of the Border Troops of the Russian Federation. In 1996, it was transformed into the Moscow Military Institute of the Federal Border Service. Since August 1, 1995, the institute has been organized into two groups of cadets based on gender.

== Educational and operational activities ==
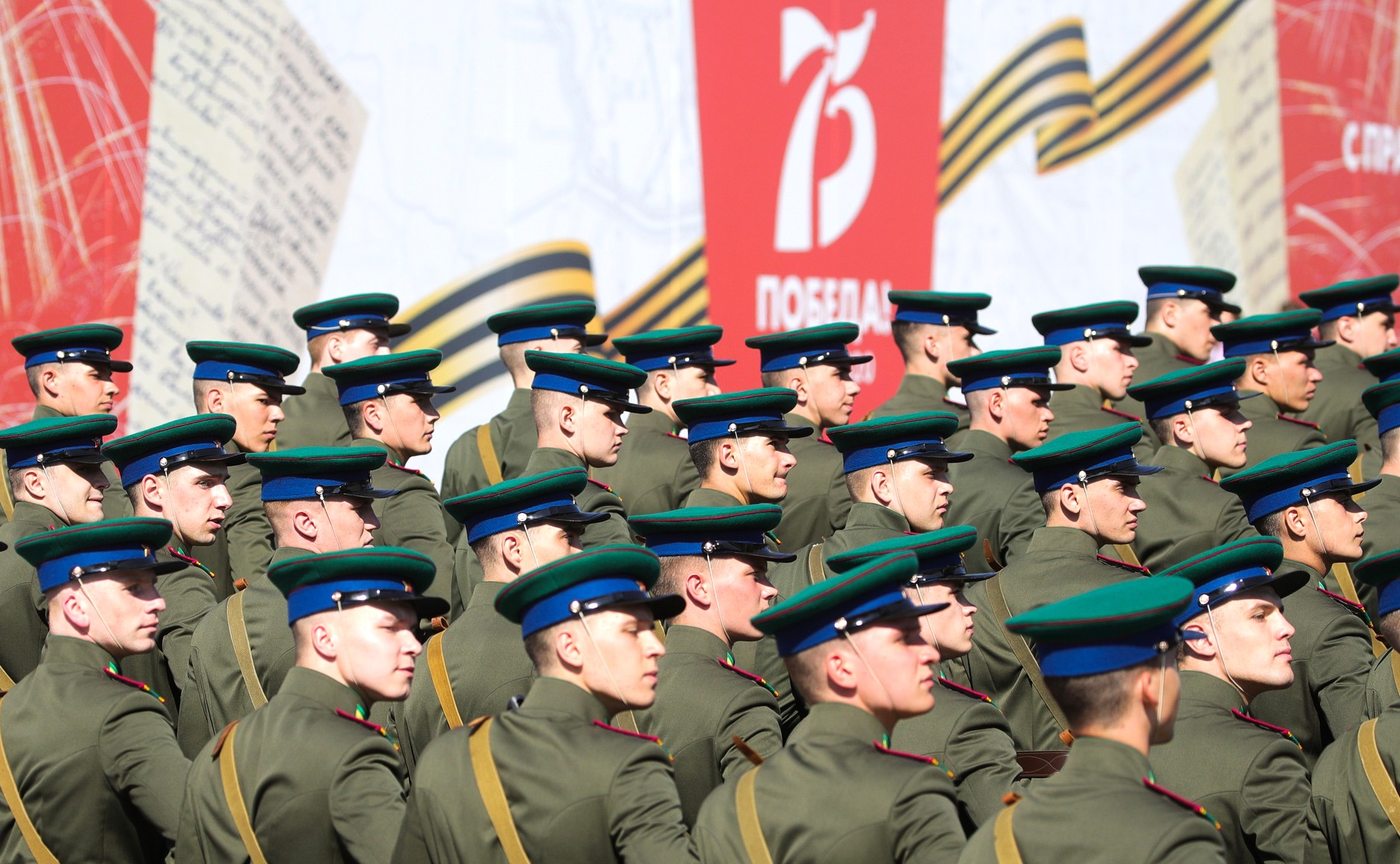
Soviet era border guard reenactors from the institute during the 2020 Moscow Victory Day Parade.

The institute provides training for officers with higher professional education, as well as military personnel under a contract with secondary professional education. The term of study is 5 years. Students who are accepted are citizens who have not completed military service and are aged from 16 to 22 years.

Cadets from the institute took part in the 2020 Moscow Victory Day Parade on Red Square, reenacting the Border Troops of the NKVD.

== Notable alumni ==
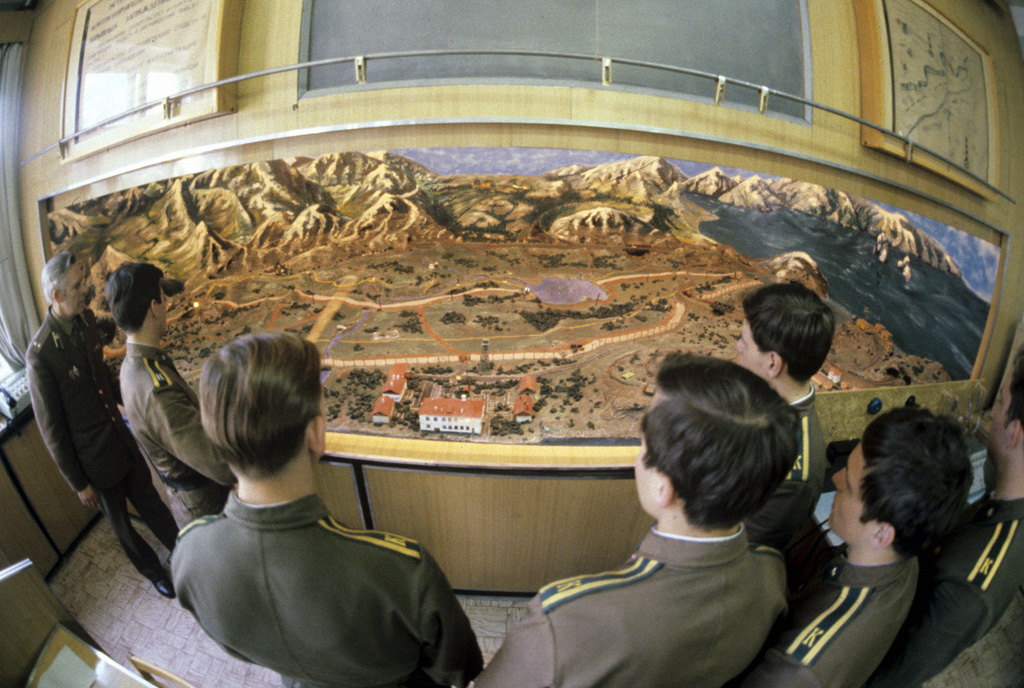
Cadets during their training in May 1982.

- Vadim Zaitsev, former chairman of the State Security Committee of the Republic of Belarus
- Oleg Safonov, Plenipotentiary Envoy to the Far Eastern Federal District
- Rayimberdi Duishenbiev, 10th Chief of the General Staff of the Armed Forces of the Kyrgyz Republic
