= Suvorov Military School =

Boarding schools in the former Soviet Union

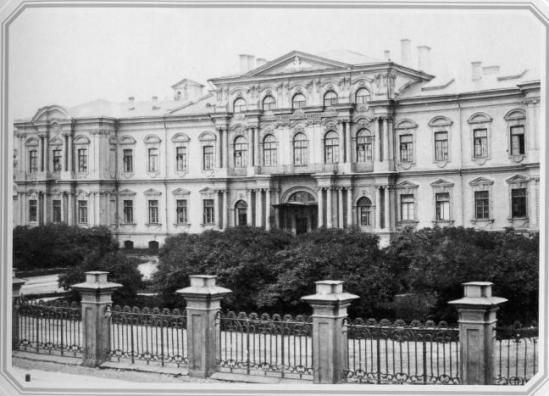
Saint Petersburg Suvorov Military School occupies the 18th-century Vorontsov Palace on Sadovaya Street

The Suvorov Military Schools (Russian: Суворовское военное училище) are a type of boarding school in the former Soviet Union and in modern Russia and Belarus for boys of 10–17. Education in these schools focuses on military related subjects. The schools are named after Alexander Suvorov, a well-known 18th century Russian general.

Their naval counterparts among Russian military schools are the Nakhimov Naval Schools. They are named after Pavel Nakhimov, the 19th century admiral.

== History ==
The Suvorov and Nakhimov school models were created during the Second World War in December 1943 to provide boys of school age, particularly those from families of military personnel, with a secondary education specializing in military (army, navy, intelligence, etc.) subjects and training. Boarding school aspect was particularly important at the time because many students were war orphans, who were either without parents or with only a surviving mother, unable to support them. A number still exist in Russia and the former Soviet Union. Other schools have existed in other Soviet republics. The former Kiev Suvorov Military School in Ukraine was reorganized in 1992 and named after Ivan Bohun in 1998. In July 1991, the Cabinet of Ministers of the USSR signed an order making the Bishkek Suvorov Military School and the Ulyanovsk Guards Suvorov Military School. Although the school in Ulyanovsk was created, the Bishkek branch was not created due to the collapse of the USSR. Carey Schofield, a British journalist with close links to the Soviet Armed Forces, wrote in 1990–91, 'it is still generally accepted that the best way for an officer to start his career is to attend one of the very smart Suvorov or Nakhimov schools, the military boarding schools.'

=== Republican Special Boarding Schools ===
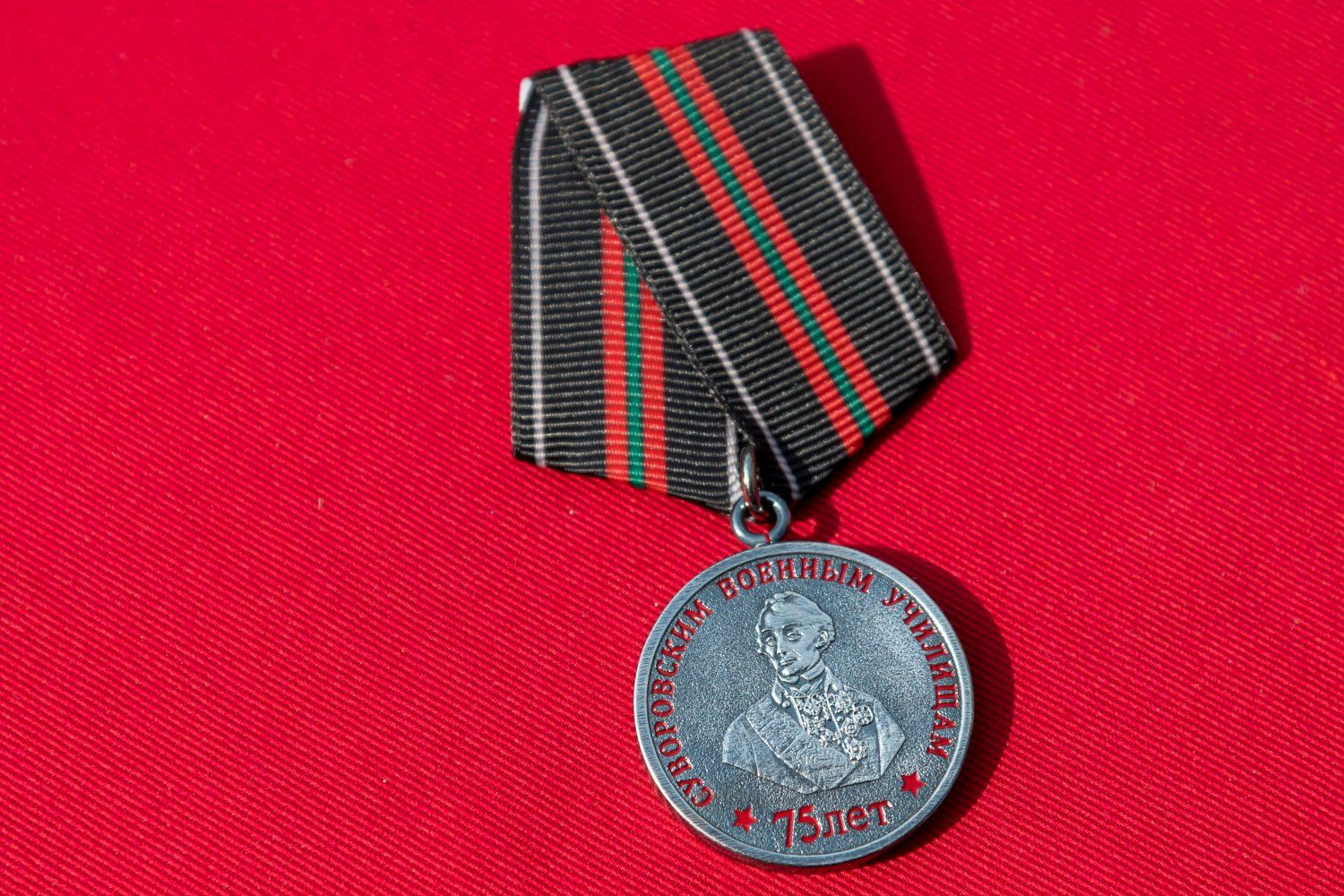
A Transnistrian medal commemorating the 75th anniversary of the founding of the first Suvorov School.

Republican Special Boarding Schools (Russian: Республиканские специальные школы-интернаты) are military schools that were created in the early 1980s on the basis of the Suvorov Military Schools. They were subordinate to the Ministry of Education of the USSR.

After the collapse of the USSR, the military lyceums/high schools in the newly formed countries in the Commonwealth of Independent States were nationalized and came under the auspices of the local defense ministries.

== Role ==
The Suvorov schools in Russia are now subordinate to the Commander-in-Chief of the Russian Ground Forces, with schools operating in cities such as Tambov, Ekaterinburg, and Kazan.

== Traditions ==
=== Corps of Drums ===
The Moscow Military Music College, which is a spin-off of the Suvorov Military School whose mission is to train future Russian military musicians, is known for its Corps of Drums. It is the oldest of these schools, opened 1937 and granted affiliation in 1944. Today, all Suvorov military schools' corps of drums have the traditional honor of opening all Victory Day Parades in their local city. Each of the Corps of Drums of the Suvorov Schools is modeled after this formation and wears identical uniforms.

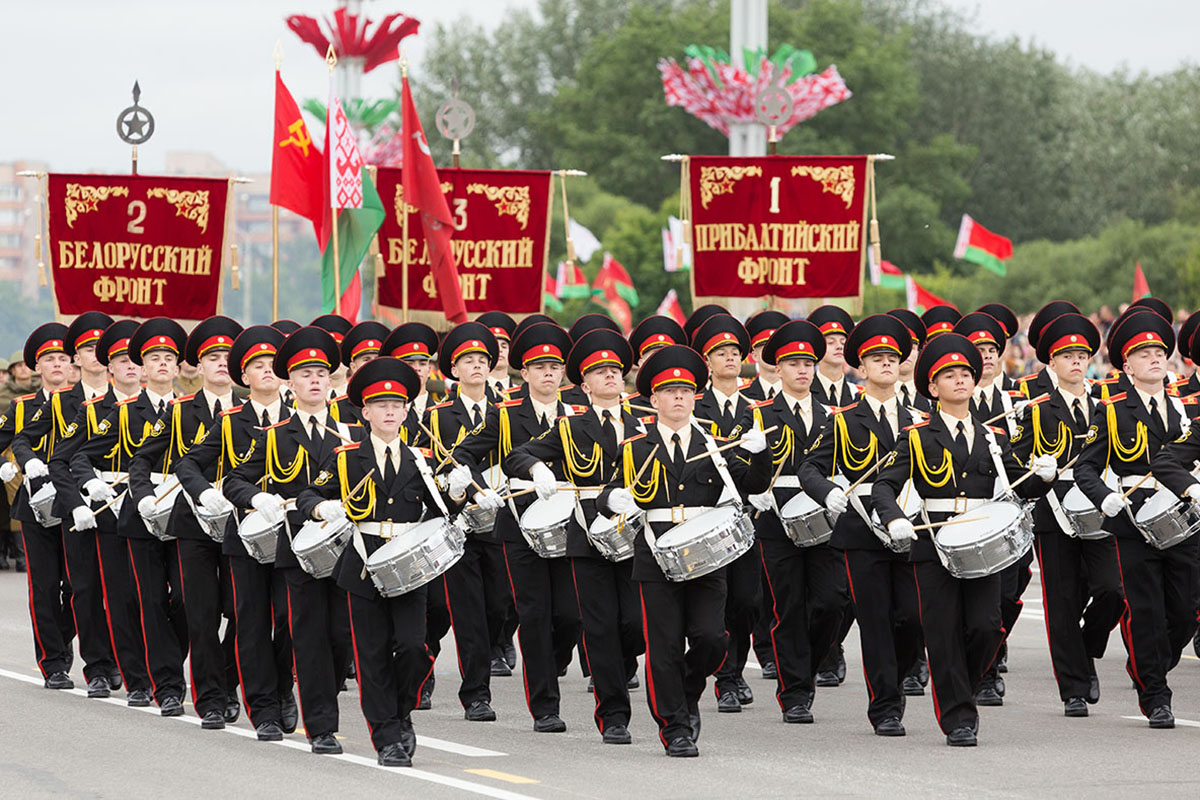
The drummers of the Minsk school during the 2017 Minsk Independence Day Parade.

=== Suvorovite military culture ===
The Military Lyceum of the Ministry of Defense of Tajikistan and the Kyrgyz State National Military Lyceum are often referred to as the "Suvorov School". In 2020, during the first Turkmen Victory Parade at the Halk Hakydasy Memorial Complex, the students of Berdimuhamed Annayev 1st Specialized Military School wore the traditional full dress uniforms of the Suvorov Military Schools.

== Active schools in Russia ==
=== Under MoD ===
Name	Location	Foundation date	Notes
Moscow Suvorov Military School	Moscow	1944	The Moscow Suvorov Military School was formed as the Gorky Suvorov Military School/ Since November 1957, it has part in all military parades that took place on Red Square. Since 2011, the graduation of Suvorovites has been carried out on Cathedral Square in the Moscow Kremlin. Opposite the school building is the Moscow Border Institute of the FSB of the Russian Federation.
Moscow Military Music College	Moscow	1937	The Valery Khalilov Moscow Suvorov Military Music College is one of the leading military music institutions in the country, founded by Major General Semyon Cherneysky. Shortly before its 80th anniversary, the "Valery Khalilov" honorific was bestowed on the college on 26 December 2016, a day after the aircrash that killed Khalilov and 91 members of the Alexandrov Ensemble while flying from Sochi.
Yekaterinburg Suvorov Military School	Yekaterinburg	1943	It is a descendant of the Oryol Suvorov Military School, which was transferred to Sverdlovsk in 1947. Since 1991, the school has been known publicly as the Yekaterinburg Suvorov Military School. In 2011, the school accepted its first foreign cadets from neighboring Mongolia.
Kazan Suvorov Military School	Kazan	1944	It descends from the Zhytomyr Military Infantry School. In 1973, the school was awarded the title of the Red Banner by the Military Council of the Volga Military District. Among its notable graduates is Valery Gerasimov (the Chief of the General Staff).
Perm Suvorov Military School	Perm	2014	
St. Petersburg Suvorov Military School	St. Petersburg	1955	
North-Caucasian Suvorov Military School	Vladikavkaz	1944	
Tver Suvorov Military School	Tver	1943	
Tula Suvorov Military School	Tula	1944/2016	This school is primarily geared to the Russian Aerospace Forces. It was conceived in March 2016, at the initiative of Alexey Dyumin, the governor of Tula Oblast and a former lieutenant general in the Russian military.
Ulyanovsk Guards Suvorov Military School	Ulyanovsk	1991	The Ulyanovsk Suvorov Military School serves cadets of the Russian Airborne Forces. It is the only active Suvorov military school that bears the honorary title of Guards. In 2015, the school received a copy of the Banner of the Simbirsk Cadet Corps (1903 sample).
Ussuriysk Suvorov Military School	Ussuriysk	1943	

=== Under the MVD ===
Name	Location	Foundation date	Notes
Astrakhan Suvorov Military School	Astrakhan		
Grozny Suvorov Military School	Grozny		
St. Petersburg Suvorov Military School	St. Petersburg		It was founded in 1976 as part of the Nakhimov Naval Academy and is considered to be one of the best schools in Russia.
Yelabuga Suvorov Military School	Yelabuga		
Novocherkassk Suvorov Military School	Novocherkassk		
Chita Suvorov Military School	Chita		
Samara Cadet Corps	Samara		

== Active schools outside of Russia ==
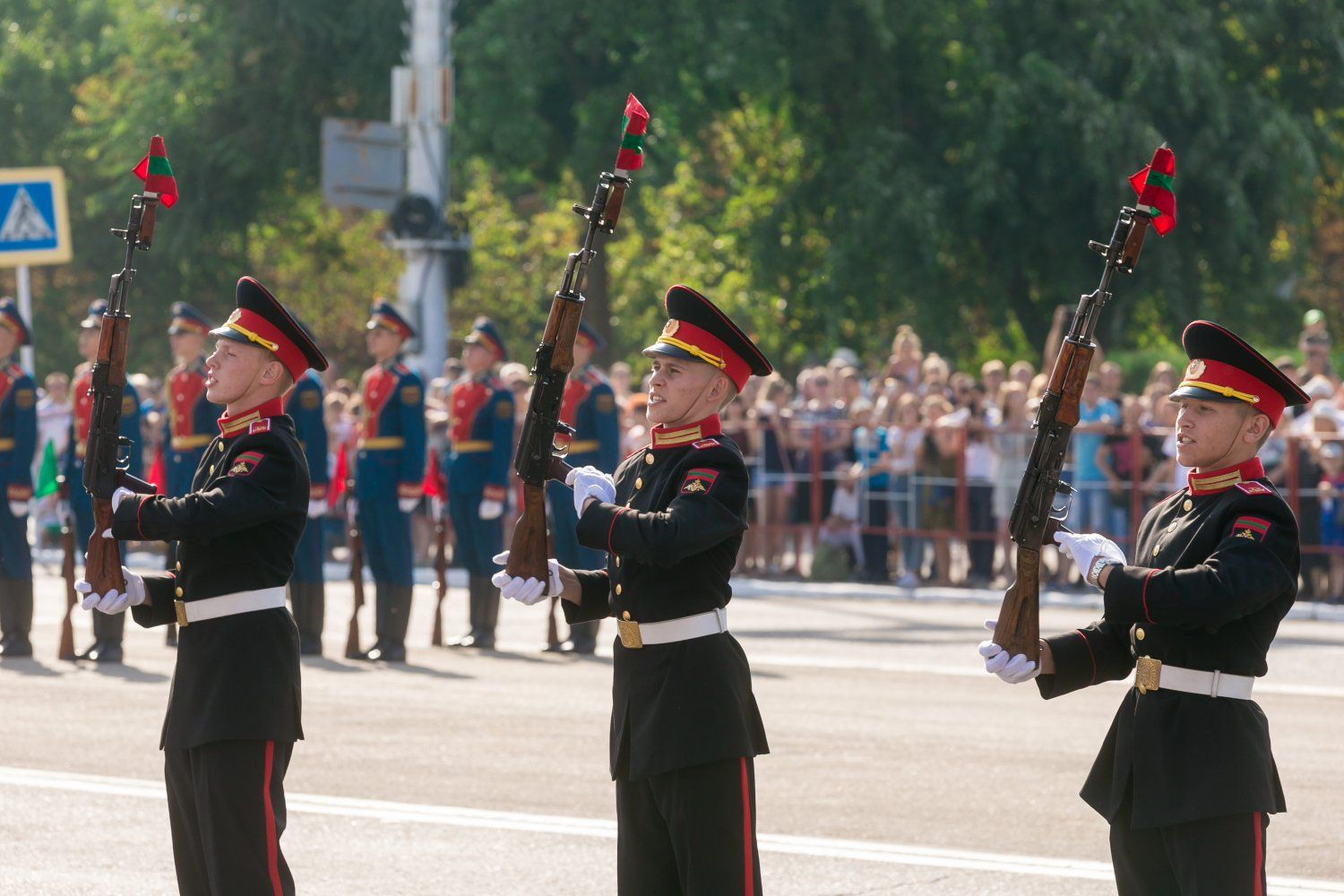
Cadets of the Tiraspol school.

Outside of the Russian Federation, there are two Suvorov Schools operating as of 2020: one each in Minsk (Belarus), and Tiraspol (Transnistria). The Minsk Suvorov Military School was established in the former building of the United Belarusian Military School on 21 May 1952. The Tiraspol Suvorov Military School is located in the partially recognized Pridnestrovian Moldavian Republic, being established on 1 September 2017.

== Former Soviet era schools ==
- Voronezh Suvorov Military School
- Kuibyshev Suvorov Military School
- Kiev Suvorov Military School
- Saratov Suvorov Military school
- Stavropol Suvorov Military School
- Stalingrad Suvorov Military School
- Tambov Suvorov Military School
- Leningrad Suvorov Military School (under the MVD)
- Tashkent Suvorov Military School (under the MVD)

== See also ==
- Nakhimov Naval School
- Cantonist

== External sources ==
- Harriet F. Scott and William F. Scott, Russian Military Directory 2004, pp. 207–208
- Association of Suvorov Military Schools
