= Mikhail Matveyevsky =

Russian military officer

- Михаил Матвеевский
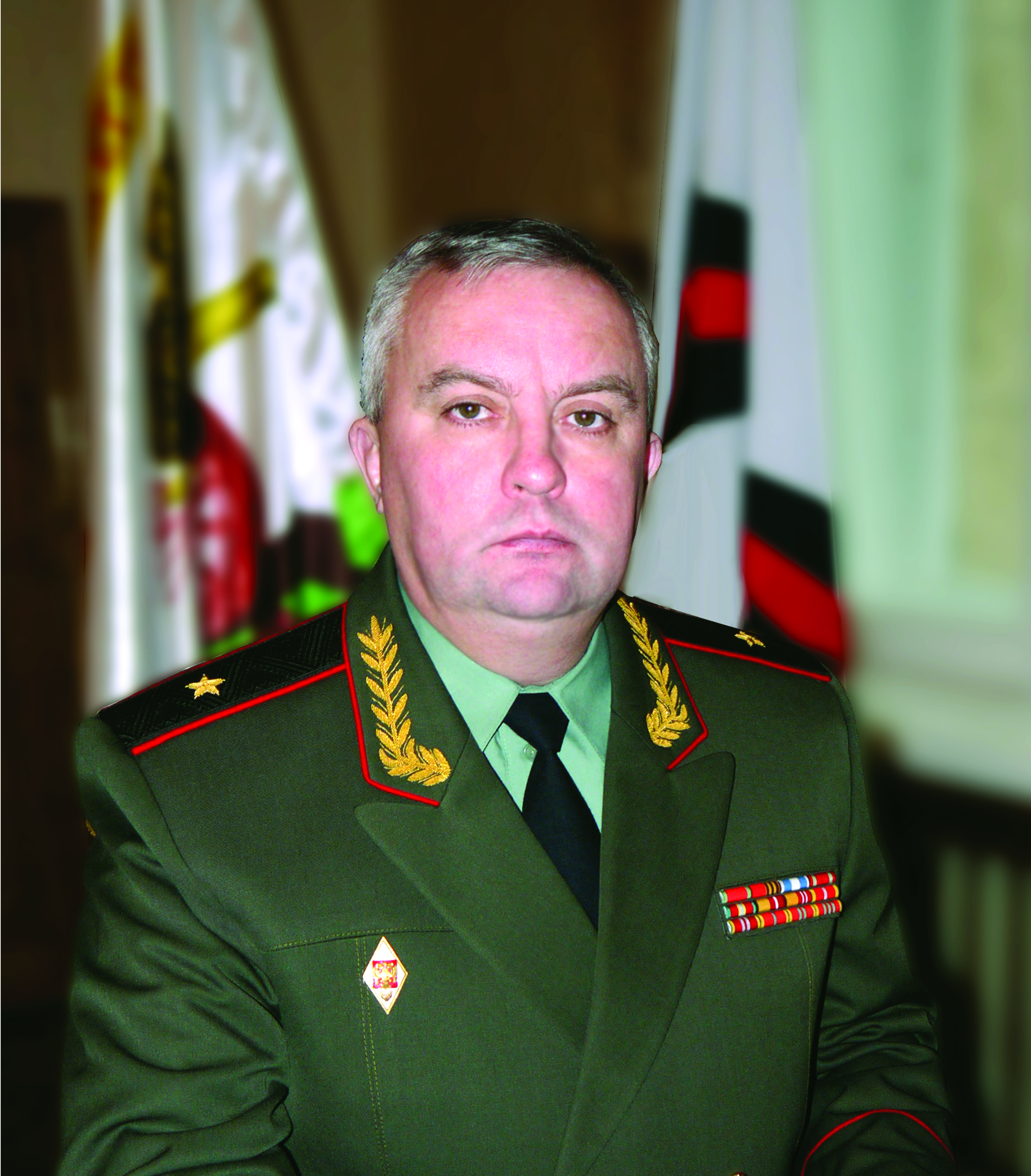
- Born: 1 January 1963 (age 63); Kichmengsko-Gorodetsky District, Vologda Oblast, RSFSR
- Alma mater: Saratov Higher Military Command and Engineering School of Missile Forces; Military Artillery Academy; General Staff Military Academy
- Military career
- Allegiance: Soviet Union Russia
- Branch: Russian Armed Forces
- Service years: 1980-
- Rank: Lieutenant general

Mikhail Mikhailovich Matveyevsky (Russian: Михаил Михайлович Матвеевский; born 1 January 1963) is a Russian military officer who served as the commander of the Russian Missile Troops and Artillery.

== Biography ==
Born January 1, 1963, in the village of Kobylsk, Kichmengsko-Gorodetsky District, Vologda Oblast. He joined the Soviet Armed Forces in 1980. He entered the Saratov Higher Military Command and Engineering School of Missile Forces, studied in the 2nd platoon of the 1st faculty. Graduated from the school in 1985. He began his service as an officer in the Murmansk Oblast. Five years later, for his success in service, in 1990 Matveyevsky was sent to study at the Military Artillery Academy in the city of Leningrad. After graduating from the academy with honors in 1993, he continued serving in the troops of the Far Eastern Military District. In the Far Eastern Military District, he rose through the ranks from the commander of a separate missile division to the first deputy chief of the missile troops and artillery of the military district. For conscientious performance of his official duty, he was awarded the rank of colonel ahead of schedule.

Matveevsky received additional education, successfully graduating from the General Staff Military Academy in 2006. In the same year, by decree of the President of Russia, Matveevsky was appointed chief of Missile Troops and Artillery of the regional command "East" in the city of Ulan-Ude. Three years later, in 2009, he was appointed to the post of chief of staff and first deputy chief of Russian Missile Troops and Artillery. From 2011 to 2023, he had been the Chief of the Russian Missile Troops and Artillery of the Russian Ground Forces. By the Decree of the President of Russia of December 13, 2012, Matveevsky was awarded the military rank of Major General. He received his next military rank of Lieutenant General in December 2015. He took direct part in the development of the Prospects for the Construction and Development of Missile Troops and Artillery, fundamental statutory documents and in the development and testing of new models of weapons and military equipment. He was replaced in 2023 by Dmitry Klimenko.

== Awards ==
- Order "For Merit to the Fatherland"
- Order of Alexander Nevsky
- Order of Military Merit
- Medal of Suvorov
- Medal of Zhukov
- Medal "For Distinction in Military Service"
- Jubilee Medal "300 Years of the Russian Navy"
- Jubilee Medal "70 Years of the Armed Forces of the USSR"
- Awards of the Ministry of Defense of Russia
- Medal "Participant of the military operation in Syria"
