= Krasnodar Higher Military School named for Army General S.M. Shtemenko =

Military academy

- Краснодарское высшее военное училище имени генерала армии С. М. Штеменко
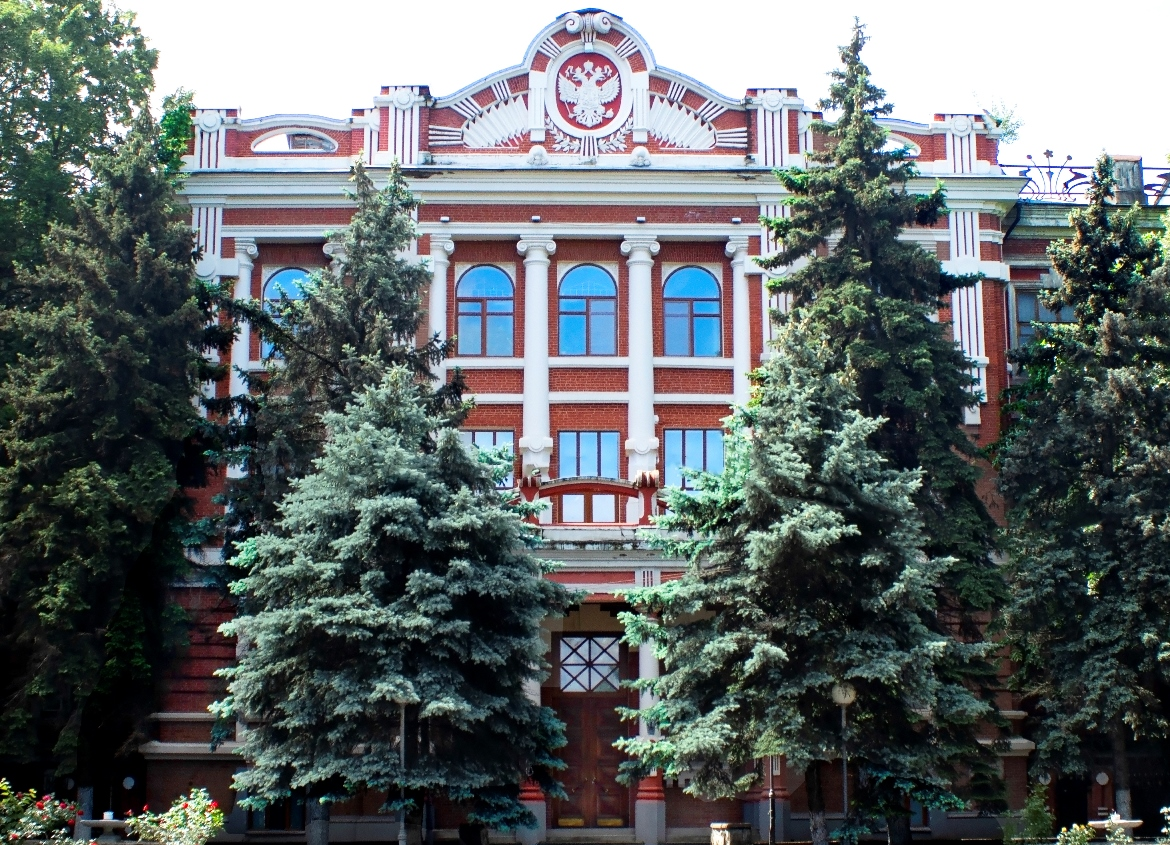
- Type: Military academy
- Established: 1929
- Rector: Major general Igor Shpyrnya
- Location: 350063, Krasin Street, 4, Krasnodar, (Russia)
- Campus: Urban
- Website: https://kvvu.mil.ru/

Krasnodar Higher Military School named for Army General S.M. Shtemenko (Russian: Краснодарское высшее военное училище имени генерала армии С. М. Штеменко, romanized: Krasnodarskoye vyssheye voyennoye uchilishche imeni generala armii S. M. Shtemenko) is a Russian military academy conducting warrant officer programmes, commissioned officer programmes (specialitet), advance training career commissioned officer programmes (magistratura), and adjunctura programmes. It is located in Krasnodar.

== History ==
The School was founded in 1929 as advanced training courses for command personnel. In 1954, courses were transformed into Military School and relocated to Krasnodar. Since 1969, it was called Krasnodar Higher Military Red Banner School. In 1977, the School was given the name of Army General Sergei Shtemenko. In 1998, the School was transformed into Krasnodar Military Institute. It was given its current name in 2015.

== Educational programmes ==
The Krasnodar Higher Military School named for Army General S.M. Shtemenko prepares information security officers for all military branches.
