= Warrant officer schools of the Russian Armed Forces =

Military training system in Russia

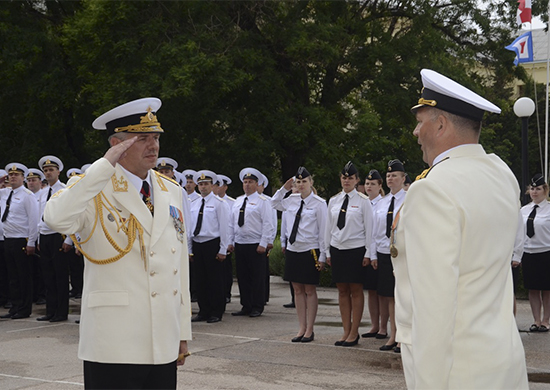
Solemn graduation of graduates of the Nakhimov Higher Naval School in 2015 (newly made warrant officers stand in the uniform with shoulder marks without longitudinal stripes down the middle)

Warrant officer schools of the Russian Armed Forces conduct warrant officer training programmes. Education acquired at such schools is vocational military education. The duration of studies is 2 years and 6–10 months.

Graduates of these schools are granted the military rank of praporshchik/michman.

== History ==
Warrant officers schools were established by Minister of Defence Order of 20 December 1980 No.365. Only enlisted personnel and non-commissioned officers, finished their military service as conscripts, could be accepted to enter warrant officers schools. The period of training was ten and half months.

The Minister of Defence Order of 20 December 1980 No.365 was replaced by the Minister of Defence Order of 27 December 2004 No.452. Only volunteer enlisted personnel and non-commissioned officers could be accepted to enter warrant officers schools.

All warrant officers schools ceased their educational activity in the framework of the Serdyukov reform. In 2013, new Minister of Defence Sergei Shoigu decided to restore the institution of warrant officers. New staff complement, which included warrant officers positions, was approved in July of the same year. Warrant officers training began to be carried out by special educational divisions within the structure of higher military schools and academies. The duration of studies extended to 2 years and 6–10 months. The admission became available not only for active duty enlisted personnel and non-commissioned officers (volunteers and conscripts) but also for civilian graduates of secondary schools who are directly commissioned into the warrant officer corps.

== List of Russian military educational institutions conducting warrant officer training programmes ==
=== General-purpose warrant officer schools ===
- Krasnodar Higher Military School named for Army General S.M. Shtemenko
- Military Institute of Physical Culture
- Military University of Radioelectronics

=== Warrant officer schools of the Ground Forces ===
- Budyonny Military Academy of the Signal Corps
- Far Eastern Higher Combined Arms Command School
- Mikhailovskaya Military Artillery Academy
- Military Academy of Field Anti-Aircraft Defense
- Military Logistics Academy
- NBC Protection Military Academy
- Tyumen Higher Military Engineer Command School named after A.I. Proshlyakov

=== Warrant officer schools of the Navy ===
- Kuznetsov Naval Academy
- Nakhimov Higher Naval School
- Pacific Higher Naval School

=== Warrant officer schools of the Aerospace Forces ===
- A.F. Mozhaysky Military-Space Academy

=== Warrant officer schools of the Airborne Forces ===
- Ryazan Guards Higher Airborne Command School
