= Yaroslavl Higher Military School of Anti-Aircraft Warfare =

Military high school

- Ярославское высшее военное училище противовоздушной обороны
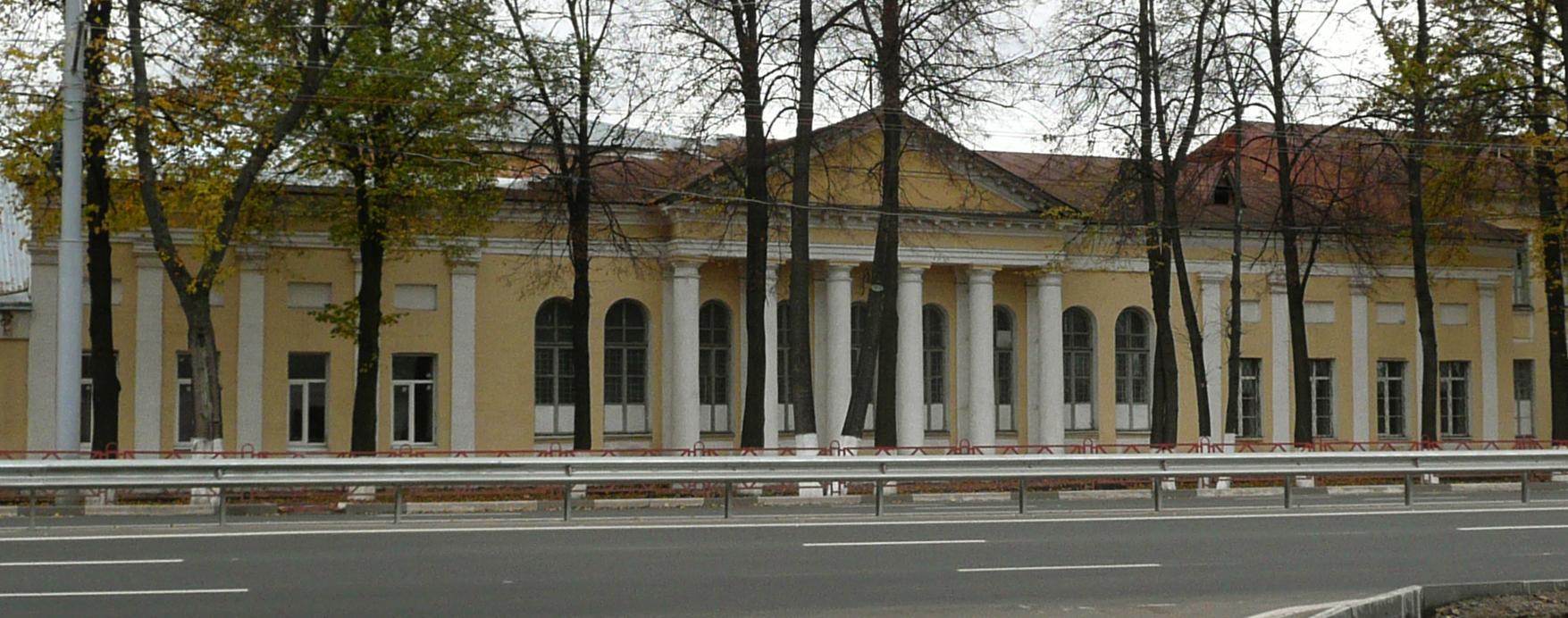
- Type: Higher military school
- Established: 1951
- Rector: Major general Alexei Poddubitskiy
- Location: 150001, Moskovsky Avenue, 28, Yaroslavl, (Russia)
- Campus: Urban
- Website: https://yavvupvo.mil.ru/

Yaroslavl Higher Military School of Anti-Aircraft Warfare (Russian: Ярославское высшее военное училище противовоздушной обороны, romanized: Yaroslavskoye vyssheye voyennoye uchilishche protivovozdushnoy oborony) is a Russian higher military school conducting commissioned officer programmes (specialitet) and adjunctura programmes. It is located in Yaroslavl.

== History ==
The school was founded on 15 October 1951 as the Yaroslavl Military-Technical School of the Air Defense Forces. It was renamed the Yaroslavl Radio-Technical School of National Air Defense in December 1965 and the Yaroslavl Anti-Aircraft Missile School of the National Air Defense Forces in April 1968. The school was raised to a higher military educational institution and renamed the Yaroslavl Higher Anti-Aircraft Missile Command School (abbreviated YaVZRKU) of the Soviet Air Defense Forces in 1971, extending its study period to four years. Cadets of the disbanded Ordzhonikidze (1990), Engels (1994), and Nizhny Novgorod (1999) VZRKUs of the PVO were merged into the school during the 1990s. Since the disbandment of the latter, the school has been the only commissioning military educational institution in Russia preparing officers for the anti-aircraft missile forces of the PVO.

During military reforms in 2009, the school was made a branch of the Zhukovsky – Gagarin Air Force Academy. The school absorbed cadets from the disbanded Tambov Higher Military Aviation Engineering School of Radio-Electronics in August of the same year and then in 2010 cadets from the disbanded branch of the Air Force Academy in Saint Petersburg, the former Saint Petersburg Higher Military Radio-Electronics School. It began training students from foreign militaries in 2010. The school became a branch of the A.F. Mozhaysky Military-Space Academy in July 2012 as a result of the reorganization of the Air Force Academy, and in August 2015 became an independent military higher educational institution again as the Yaroslavl Higher Military School of Air Defense.

== Educational programmes ==
The School prepares officers for the Air and Missile Defense Forces.
