= Military Academy of Field Anti-Aircraft Defense =

Military academy

- Военная академия войсковой противовоздушной обороны имени Маршала Советского Союза; А.М. Василевского
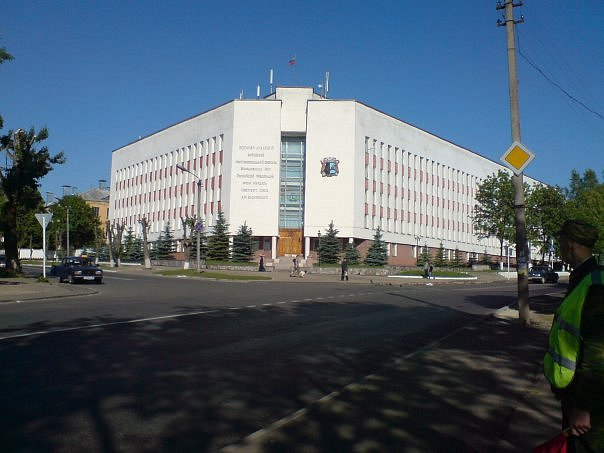
- Type: Military academy
- Established: 1970
- Rector: Lieutenant general Gleb Yeryemin
- Location: 214027, Kotovsky Street, 2, Smolensk, (Russia); 54.802°N 32.004°E
- Campus: Urban
- Website: https://vavpvo.mil.ru/

Military Academy of Field Anti-Aircraft Defense named after Marshal of the Soviet Union A.M. Vasilevsky (Note: Russian: Военная академия войсковой противовоздушной обороны имени Маршала Советского Союза А.М. Василевского, romanized: Voyennaya akademiya voyskovoy protivovozdushnoy oborony imeni Marshala Sovetskogo Soyuza A. M. Vasilevskogo) is a Russian military academy conducting warrant officer programmes, commissioned officer programmes (specialitet), advance training career commissioned officer programmes (magistratura), and adjunctura programmes. It is located in Smolensk.

== History ==
The Academy was founded in 1970 as Smolensk Higher Anti-Aircraft Artillery School. It was transformed into Military Academy of Anti-Aircraft Defense of Ground Forces by the Presidential Order of 31 March 1992 №146-RP. It was transformed into Military University of Field Anti-Aircraft Defense by the Government Order of 29 August 1998 №1009. Then it was transformed into Military Academy of Field Anti-Aircraft Defense by the Government Order of 9 July 2004 №937-R. It was given the name of Marshal of the Soviet Union Aleksandr Vasilevsky by the Government Order of 11 May 2007 №593-R.

== Educational programmes ==
The Academy prepares anti-aircraft artillery officers for the Ground Forces.
