= Military University of Radioelectronics =

Military academy

- Военный университет радиоэлектроники
- Type: Military academy
- Established: 1957
- Rector: Major general Sergei Bulygin
- Location: 162622, Sovetskiy Avenue, 126, Cherepovets, (Russia)
- Campus: Urban
- Website: https://vure.mil.ru/

The Military University of Radioelectronics (Russian: Военный университет радиоэлектроники, romanized: Voyennyy universitet radioelektroniki) is a Russian military academy conducting warrant officer programmes, commissioned officer programmes (specialitet), advance training career commissioned officer programmes (magistratura), and adjunctura programmes. It is located in Cherepovets.

== History ==
The University was founded in 1957 as Cherepovets Military School of Communications. In 1970, it was renamed the Cherepovets Higher Military Command School of Communications. In 1974, it was renamed the Cherepovets Higher Military Engineering School of Radioelectronics. In 1998, the School was transformed into Cherepovets Military Engineering Institute of Radioelectronics. In 2020, it received the current name.

== Educational programmes ==
The Military University of Radioelectronics prepares officers-specialists in radioelectronics for all military branches.
