= Richard Theremin =

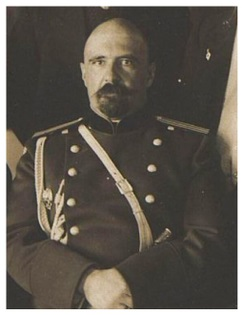
Theremin with the rank of colonel, pictured in 1912

Richard Iosifovich Theremin or Termen (Russian: Ричард Иосифович Термен; 1870–1937) was a Russian officer, diplomat, and orientalist. Educated at the Mikhailovskaya Military Artillery Academy and the Nikolaev Academy of the General Staff, he specialized in Arabic and Ottoman Turkish and served in the Caucasus and the Ottoman borderlands.

Theremin descended from a family of Huguenot immigrants. From 1905 to 1908 he was Russian vice-consul in Van, where he investigated conditions along the Iranian–Ottoman frontier and engaged with Assyrian and Armenian communities. His writings, especially the Report on the Trip to Hakkari and his 1907 Report on the Clashes on the Persian–Turkish Border, are important historical sources on Russo-Ottoman relations, frontier politics, and interethnic relations in the Ottoman-held Armenian Highlands and northwestern Iran.

During World War I, Theremin distinguished himself on the Caucasus Front, particularly in the Battle of Sarikamish, and rose to the rank of major general. After the Russian Civil War, he emigrated to Bulgaria, where he died in Sofia in 1937.

== Sources ==
- Arakelova, Victoria (2025). "Richard Theremin and His "Report on the Clashes on the Persian-Turkish Border" (1907)". Iran and the Caucasus. 29 (4–5): 491–503. doi:10.1163/1573384X-02904009.
