= Yuri Stavitsky =

- Юрий Михайлович Ставицкий
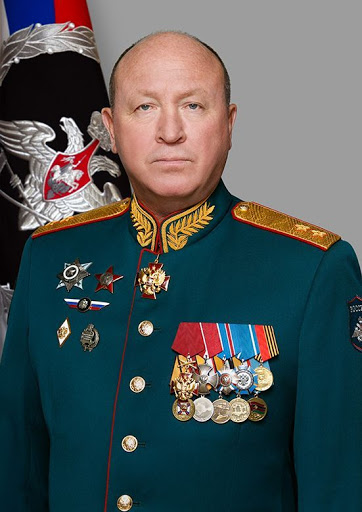
- Born: January 21, 1961 (age 65); Murmansk, RSFSR,Soviet Union
- Alma mater: Tyumen Military Engineer Command School, Military Academy of the General Staff
- Military career
- Allegiance: Soviet Union; Russia
- Branch: Soviet Army; Russian Ground Forces
- Rank: Lieutenant general
- Commands: Russian Engineer Troops
- Conflicts: Syrian Civil War
- Awards: Order "For Merit to the Fatherland", Order of Alexander Nevsky, Order of Courage, Order of Military Merit, Order of Honour, Order of the Red Star, Order "For Service to the Homeland in the Armed Forces of the USSR", Medal of Zhukov, Medal "For Distinction in Military Service", Jubilee Medal "70 Years of the Armed Forces of the USSR", Medal "Participant of the military operation in Syria", Medal "For Impeccable Service"

Yuri Mikhailovich Stavitsky (Russian: Юрий Михайлович Ставицкий; born 21 January, 1961, Murmansk Oblast, RSFSR, Soviet Union) is a Russian military officer, head of the Engineering Troops of the Russian Armed Forces since July 2010. He holds the rank of Lieutenant General (2013) and holds the title Honored Military Specialist of the Russian Federation.

== Biography ==
Born on January 21, 1961 in Murmansk Oblast.

He graduated from the Tyumen Higher Military Engineering Command School in 1982, the Military Engineering Academy, and the Military Academy of the General Staff of the Russian Armed Forces.

In the army he held all command positions from the commander of an engineering positional platoon to the commander of a separate engineering brigade, was the chief of staff of the engineering troops of the Volga–Ural Military District, and the chief of the engineering troops of the Leningrad and North Caucasus military districts.

From 1986 to 1988 he served in the Democratic Republic of Afghanistan, where he took part in the hostilities. From 1999 to 2000, he participated in the counter terrorism operation in the North Caucasus region.

Since July 2010 he serves as Chief of the Russian Engineer Troops of the Russian Armed Forces. The military rank of lieutenant general was awarded by Decree of the President of Russia on June 12, 2013.

Since 2016, Stavitsky often travelled on business trips to Syria, as part of the Russian involvement in the country's civil war. He is involved in Russia's invasion of Ukraine.

Military offices
Preceded by Vladimir Prokopchik	Commander of the Russian Engineer Troops; 2010–	Succeeded by Incumbent
