= Military commissioning schools in Russia =

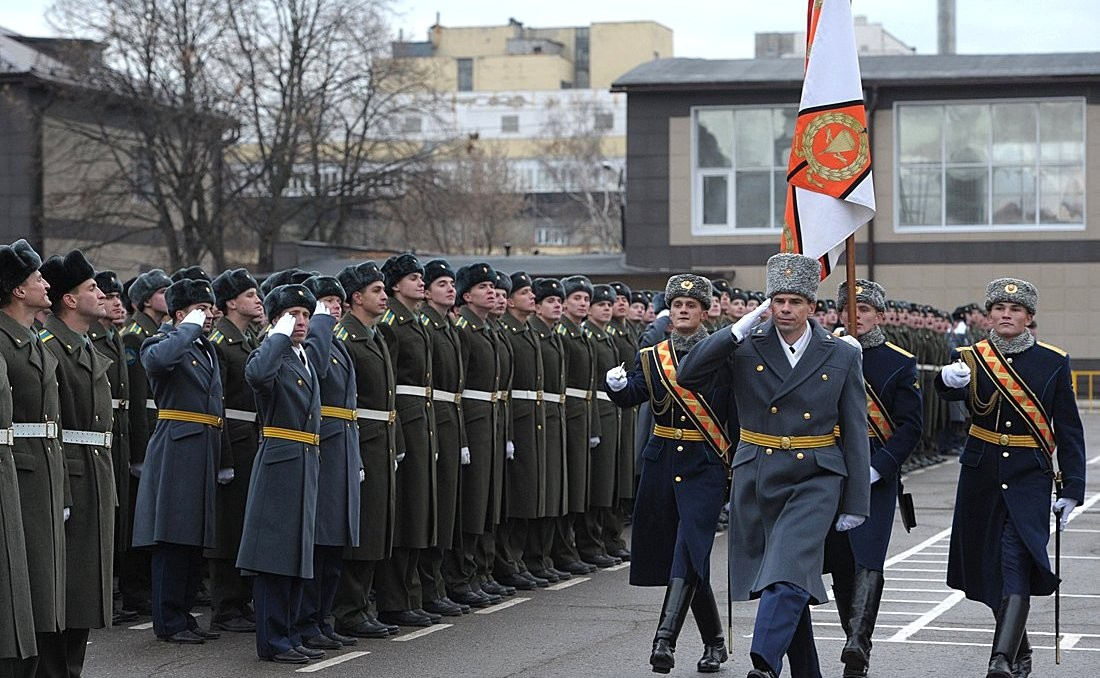
Banner group marching in front of the cadets of the Ryazan Guards Higher Airborne Command School

The military commissioning schools are educational institutions conducting career commissioned officer training programmes. Education acquired at such schools is higher military education (level 6 according to International Standard Classification of Education). These programmes are named specialitet (Russian: специалитет) and take 5 years. Graduates of commissioning schools are assigned the military rank of lieutenant.

The commissioning schools are the first (tactical) level of officer training. Their graduates are appointed as platoon/company commanders and at equivalent positions. After several years of active duty service they can entry military academy for further education.

== History ==
The Russian military education system, inherited from the Soviet Union, trains officer-specialists in narrowly defined military occupational specialties. Modern Russian military educational institutions conducting commissioning programmes may have different names (academy, institute, higher school), it stems from tradition and has no effect on the content of aforementioned programmes.

At the moment, some commissioning schools also conduct warrant officer programmes.

== List of Russian military educational institutions conducting commissioning officer training programmes ==
=== General-purpose military commissioning schools ===
- S. M. Kirov Military Medical Academy
- Krasnodar Higher Military School named for Army General S.M. Shtemenko
- Military Institute of Physical Culture
- Military University of Radioelectronics
- Military University of the Ministry of Defense of the Russian Federation

=== Military commissioning schools of the Ground Forces ===
- Budyonny Military Academy of the Signal Corps
- Far Eastern Higher Combined Arms Command School
- Kazan Higher Tank Command School
- Mikhailovskaya Military Artillery Academy
- Military Academy of Field Anti-Aircraft Defense
- Military Logistics Academy
- Moscow Higher Military Command School
- NBC Protection Military Academy
- Novosibirsk Higher Military Command School
- Tyumen Higher Military Engineer Command School named after A.I. Proshlyakov

=== Military commissioning schools of the Navy ===
- Saint Petersburg Naval Institute
- Nakhimov Black Sea Higher Naval School
- Pacific Higher Naval School
- Ushakov Baltic Higher Naval School
- Naval Polytechnic Institute

=== Military commissioning schools of the Aerospace Forces ===
- A.F. Mozhaysky Military-Space Academy
- Krasnodar Higher Military Aviation School of Pilots
- Yaroslavl Higher Military School of Anti-Aircraft Warfare
- Zhukov Air and Space Defence Academy
- Zhukovsky – Gagarin Air Force Academy

=== Military commissioning schools of the Airborne Forces ===
- Ryazan Guards Higher Airborne Command School

=== Military commissioning schools of the Strategic Rocket Forces ===
- Peter the Great Military Academy of the Strategic Missile Forces
