= Russian Engineer Troops =

Combat Arm of the Russian Ground Forces for military engineering

Engineer Troops of the Russian Federation
- Active: 1996-present
- Country: Russia
- Type: Combat Arm

Commanders
- Current commander: Lieutenant General Yuri Stavitsky

The Engineer Troops of the Russian Federation (Russian: Инженерные войска Российской Федерации) are a Combat Arm and military administrative corps of the Russian Ground Forces of the Russian Federation designed to perform military engineering operations (combat actions), requiring special training of personnel and use of means of engineer equipment, as well as for damaging the enemy through application of engineer ammunition.

== History ==
=== Imperial era ===
One of the first engineering units founded in the Russian Empire was the Pososhniye lyudi, a collective name for conscripts in the Imperial Russian Army called up for military service from each sokha unit. In the late 17th century, the first engineering training maneuvers were carried out under the patronage of Peter I. The day of the Engineering Forces is recognized as 21 January 1701, with on the opening of the School of the Pushkar Order. The first engineering schools were created in 1708 in Moscow and then in March 1719 in St. Petersburg. The terms of study at these schools ranged from 5 to 12 years. The Imperial Engineering Troops first took part in the Battle of Poltava, the Patriotic War of 1812, Crimean War from 1853 to 1856, and the First World War.

=== Soviet Engineer Troops ===
After the February Revolution and the Great October Socialist Revolution of 1917 the newly formed Red Army and Soviet Navy incorporated the sapper units of the former Imperial Russian Army and Navy in their structure. By 1919, pontoon and electrical battalions and a mine-blasting brigade were raised in time for the Civil War. 10 years later, the Engineering Troops of the USSR (Russian: Инженерные войска СССР) were in much better shape and had a much better organization. During the Second World War, ten sapper armies operated, later reorganized into brigades. From the mid-1940s to the 1970s, Engineer-Sapper Companies (ISR) were located in Soviet Army regiments, divisions, and combined-arms armies. Due to miscalculations in planning by the Ministry of Defense of the Soviet Union, there was a shortage of engineering units serving in Afghanistan during the Soviet–Afghan War. In 1986, the Engineering Troops took part in the military response to the biological effects of the Chernobyl accident. After the collapse of the USSR in late 1991, the engineering troops were dissolved and its component units were absorbed by Russia and the newly formed armed forces of nations such as Ukraine, Belarus, Kazakhstan, and Armenia.

=== Russian Federation ===
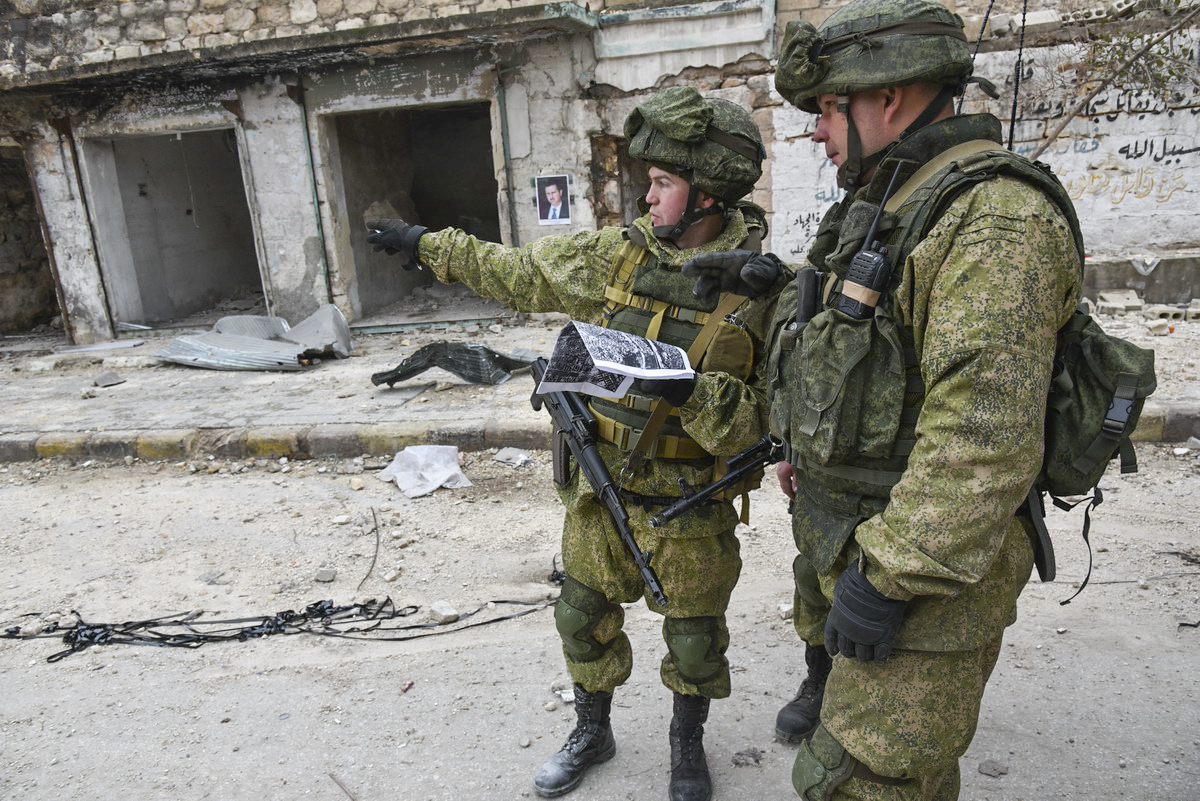
Russian Engineer Troops in a demining operation in Aleppo, 18 December 2016

The official holiday of the Engineering Troops was established by decree of President Boris Yeltsin on 18 September 1996. By order of the Minister of Defense on 23 September 1996, it was prescribed to celebrate the Day of Engineering Troops on January 21 annually.

== Mission ==
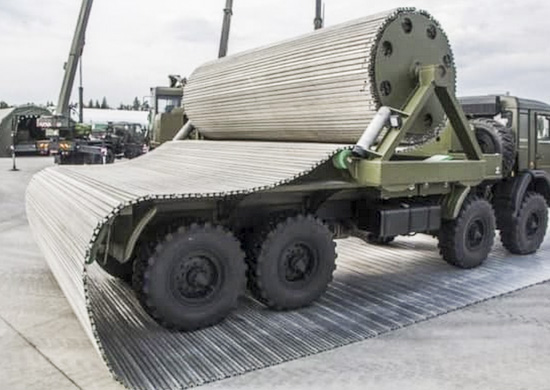
Engineering vehicle for laying temporary roads on the basis of KamAZ-63501

In preparation and conduct of combined-arms operations (combat actions) the Engineer Troops perform, among others, the following tasks:

- engineer reconnaissance of the enemy, terrain and objects;
- construction (arrangement) of fortifications (trenches, ditches and communication trenches, shelters, bunkers, dugouts, tunnels, roadblocks, wire obstacles, defensive fighting positions etc.) and organization of field deployment of troops (residential, logistical, medical);
- organisation of engineering obstacles to troop movement, including installation of mine fields, production of blasting, organisation of non-explosive anti-tank obstacles (anti-tank ditches, scarps/counterscarps, stakes, abatis etc.);
- clearance of areas and facilities;
- preparation and maintenance of traffic routes of troops;
- creation and maintenance of ferries across water barriers, including construction of bridges;
- extraction and purification of water in the battlefield

In addition, they are involved in countering the intelligence systems and homing of the enemy's weapons (camouflage), simulation of troops and facilities, providing misinformation and demonstrative actions to deceive the enemy as well as to eliminate or reduce the effects of enemy weapons of mass destruction.

In peacetime, the Engineer Troops have a number of tasks: they clean areas of explosive hazards, are involved in the response and liquidation of aftermath of man-made accidents and catastrophes, natural disasters, prevent destruction of bridges and waterworks during floating of ice, etc. According to the Russian Ministry of Defense, further development of the Engineer Troops is carried out through equipping them with new engineer equipment, built on the basis of standardized elements, blocks and modules, with a simultaneous decrease of the nomenclature samples of the same type for the intended purpose.

== Structure ==
The Engineer Troops are composed of formations, units and subdivisions for various purposes: engineering-reconnaissance, field engineering, fencing, obstacle clearing, assault-and-traffic engineering, pontoon bridge (pontoon), assault-crossing, camouflage-engineering, technology-engineering, field water supplying ones and so on.

=== Composition ===
- Directorate of the Commander of the Engineering Troops (Moscow)
- 1st Guards Engineer-Sapper Brigade (Murom, Western Military District)
- 11th Guards Engineer Brigade (Kamensk-Shakhtinsky, Southern Military District)
- 12th Guards Engineer Brigade (Ufa, Central Military District)
- 14th Guards Engineer Brigade (Vyatskoye, Khabarovsk Krai, Eastern Military District)
- 45th Guards Engineer Brigade (Murom, Western Military District)
- 28th Pontoon Bridge Brigade (Murom)
- 6th Engineer Regiment (Rostov) (1st GTA)
- 16th Engineer Regiment (Boguchar, 20th GCAA)
- 24th Engineer Regiment (Kyzyl, 41st GCAA)
- 30th Engineer Regiment (Kerro, Vsevolozhsky District, 6th CAA)
- 31st Engineer Regiment (Prokhladny, 58th GCAA)
- 32nd Engineer Regiment (Afipsky, 49th CAA)
- 33rd Engineer Regiment (Volgograd, 8th GCAA)
- 35th Engineer Regiment (Razdolnoe, Primorsky Krai, 5th GCAA)
- 39th Engineer Regiment (Kizner, 2nd GCAA)
- 40th Engineer Regiment (Ishim, 41st GCAA)
- 45th Separate Engineer-Camouflage Regiment (HQ located in Vladimir Oblast; Western Military District; in late 2020 reported at Inzhenernyy 1, 55.793785, 37.192298). Military Unit Number 58142. The regiment's formation was completed in June 2017; as well as the ability to quickly camouflage key facilities, it has "“inflatable models of tanks, guns, infantry fighting vehicles, PVO [air defense] systems, and other weapons systems."
- Training centers
  - 66th Interdepartmental Training Methodological Center of Engineering Troops (Nakhabino)
  - International Mine Action Center (Nakhabino)
  - 187th Interspecific Regional Training Center for the Engineering Troops (Volzhsky),
  - 210th Guards Interspecific Regional Training Center for the Engineering Troops (Kstovo)
- Research institutes
  - Central Research and Testing Institute of Engineering Troops (Nakhabino)
- Orthodox Choir and Engineering Troops Ensemble "For Faith and Fatherland"

== Educational institutions ==
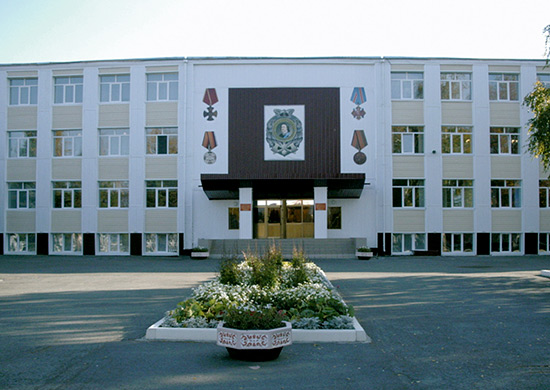
The Tyumen Higher Military Engineering Command School

- Military Engineering Academy
- Military Institute (Engineering Troops) of the Combined Arms Academy of the Armed Forces of the Russian Federation
- Military Engineering-Technical University
- Tyumen Higher Military Engineering Command School named after Marshal of the Engineering Troops Alexey Proshlyakov

== Commanders of the Engineering Troops ==
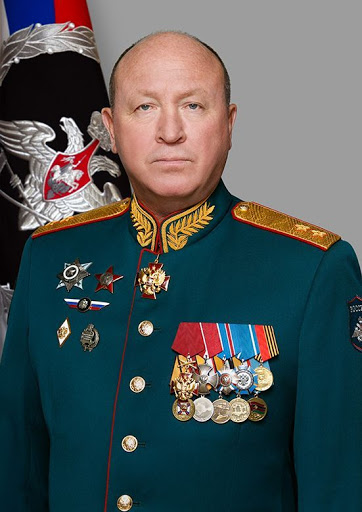
Lieutenant General Yuri Stavitsky

- Colonel General Vladimir Kuznetsov (1992–1999)
- Colonel General Nikolai Serdtsev (1999–2008)
- Lieutenant General Yuri Balkhovitin (2008–2009)
- Colonel Vladimir Prokopchik (interim) (2009–2010)
- Lieutenant General Yuri Stavitsky (since July 2010)
