= Mikhail Karatuev =

Mikhail Ivanovich Karatuev
- Born: 5 November 1945 (age 80); Potsdam, Germany
- Military career
- Allegiance: Soviet Union; Russia
- Branch: Soviet Armed Forces
- Service years: 1964–2000
- Rank: Colonel general Polkovnik
- Conflicts: Warsaw Pact invasion of Czechoslovakia; First Chechen War; Second Chechen War
- Awards: Order of Military Merit; Order of Honour
- Other work: Since 2000, he has been in the civil service of St. Petersburg

Mikhail Ivanovich Karatuev (born 5 November 1945) is a Russian military leader, government figure, and colonel general (1998).

== Biography ==
Karatuev was born into a military family. His father, Captain Ivan Pavlovich Karatuev (1922–1955), began his career as an artilleryman in World War II and after being injured, he became an operative of SMERSH in the 47th Guards Rifle Division of the 8th Guards Combined Arms Army. Mikhail's mother Mariya Efimova (born 1919) was a combat medic, and a senior lieutenant in the medical service. At the time of the birth of their son, the family lived where Mikhail's parents were serving in the Group of Soviet Forces in Germany, where Mikhail was born. Due to the fact that there were still no registry offices in the GSFG, Karatuev was registered in the registry office near his mother's residence in Klintsy, Bryansk oblast and is stated as being born there in official records. He lived in Potsdam, but after the death of his father and his mother being discharged from the army, he lived in Klintsy. He finished high school there.

He joined the Soviet Army in August 1964. He graduated from Sumy Higher Artillery Command School in 1967. He served as commander of an artillery platoon and artillery battery in the GSFG. In 1968, he participated in the Warsaw Pact invasion of Czechoslovakia. He received severe burns while rescuing a wounded conscript from an armoured personnel carrier that was set on fire by demonstrators.

In 1973, he graduated from Mikhailovskaya Military Artillery Academy. In 1973, he became commander of the missile divizion of the 8th Guards Artillery Regiment of the Leningrad Military District (Vyborg). In November 1976 he became the commander of an artillery regiment in the same district (Alakurtti, Murmansk Oblast) and head of missile troops and artillery of the 341st Rifle Division. In 1981 he became Chief of Staff of the 2nd Guards Artillery Division (Pushkin, Leningrad Oblast). He received the ranks major and podpolkovnik ahead of schedule. In March 1984, he was appointed commander of this division.

He graduated from the Military Academy of the General Staff of the Armed Forces of Russia in 1989 with a gold medal. In 1989 he became the Commander of Rocket Troops and Artillery of the 1st Guards Tank Army in GSFG (headquartered in Dresden). In February 1992 he became Deputy Chief and Chief of Missile Forces and Artillery of GSFG. In November 1993 he was moved to Commander of Rocket Troops and Artillery of the North Caucasus Military District. He became a lieutenant general on 6 June 1994.

In November 1994 he became Deputy Chief of Mikhailovskaya Military Artillery Academy. In March 1997 he became Commander of Russian Missile Troops and Artillery in the Russian Ground Forces. In May 1998, he became the head of Rocket Troops and Artillery of the Russian Armed Forces. He was a participant in the first and second Chechen Wars. Since December 2000, he has been in the reserves.

He is the author and coauthor of 46 scientific papers on the development of the Armed Forces and Missile Forces. Karatuev has three degrees. He earned a Doctor of Sciences in 1997, professor in 1999 and corresponding member of the Russian Academy of Rocket and Artillery Sciences in 1998.

Immediately after getting discharged in December 2000, he took the position of head of the territorial administration of the Pavlovsky administrative district in Saint Petersburg. After the reorganization of public administration in August 2001, he became the head of the united territorial administration of Pavlovsky and Pushkinsky District. After another reorganization in 2005 he became head of the administration of the Pushkinsky district of St. Petersburg. In these positions, he was repeatedly incentivized by Decrees from the Governor of Saint Petersburg and the Legislative Assembly of Saint Petersburg. In February 2007, he was relieved of his post for health reasons.

He lives in Pushkin. He works as chief military inspector-advisor of the Western Military District. He does a lot of social work, and leads the organizations "Bryansk Community," "Peresvet," and the "Academy of Military Historical Sciences."

== Awards ==
- Order of Military Merit
- Order of Honour (11/15/2005)
- Awards of foreign countries
- Honorable Citizen of the City of Pushkin (2006)

== Works ==
- "Особенности боевых действий войск, боевого применения ракетных войск и артиллерии в вооружённых конфликтах" ("Features of military operations of troops, combat use of missile troops and artillery in armed conflicts") (1996)
- "Современные тенденции развития военного образования" ("Modern trends in the development of military education") (1997)
- "Проблемы разведки и радиоэлектронной борьбы в интересах применения ракетных войск и артиллерии в операции (бою) и пути их решения" ("Problems of reconnaissance and electronic warfare in the interests of the use of missile troops and artillery in an operation (combat) and ways to solve them") (1998)
- "Ракетные войска и артиллерия в локальных войнах и вооружённых конфликтах" ("Missile troops and artillery in local wars and armed conflicts") (1998)
- Михаил Каратуев: «Бог войны» меняет тактику // «Независимое военное обозрение». 1999. 19 ноября. (Mikhail Karatuev: "God of War" changes tactics // Independent Military Review. 1999. November 19.)
- Каратуев М. И. Фролов М. И. 1939—1945. Взгляд из России и из Германии. — СПб.: СРП «Павел» ВОГ). — 365 с. (Karatuev M. I. Frolov M. I. 1939-1945. View from Russia and from Germany. - St. Petersburg: SRP "Pavel" VOG). - 365 p.); Pokrovskiĭ, N. I.; Покровский, Н. И. (2000). Kavkazskie voĭny i imamat Shamili︠a︡. Moskva: ROSSPĖN. ISBN 5-8243-0078-X. OCLC 44909551.

== Sources ==
- Kulikova, A. S., ed. (2014). Военная элита Российской Федерации. Краткий энциклопедический справочник [Military elite of the Russian Federation. Brief encyclopedic reference book.] (in Russian). Moscow: Veche. ISBN 978-5-4444-2015-7.
- Коллектив авторов. История отечественной артиллерии в лицах: военачальники, возглавлявшие артиллерию (ракетные войска и артиллерию) в 1700-2019 гг.. — М.: Горизонт, 2019. (Multiple authors, "The history of domestic artillery in faces: military leaders who led artillery (rocket troops and artillery) in 1700-2019. - M .: Horizont, 2019) — ISBN 978-5-6042237-3-4
- Мелуа А. И. Ракетная техника, космонавтика и артиллерия. Биографии ученых и специалистов. — 2-е изд.. — СПб.: Гуманистика, 2005. — С. 337. — 1126 с. — 1500 экз. (Melua A. I., Rocket technology, astronautics and artillery. Biographies of scientists and specialists. - 2nd ed. - St. Petersburg: Humanistics, 2005. - S. 337. - 1126 p.) — ISBN 5-86050-243-5
