= Russian Missile Troops and Artillery =

Combat Arm of the Russian Ground Forces for missiles and artillery

- Ракетные войска и артиллерия Raketny voyska i artilleriya
- Emblem of the Service

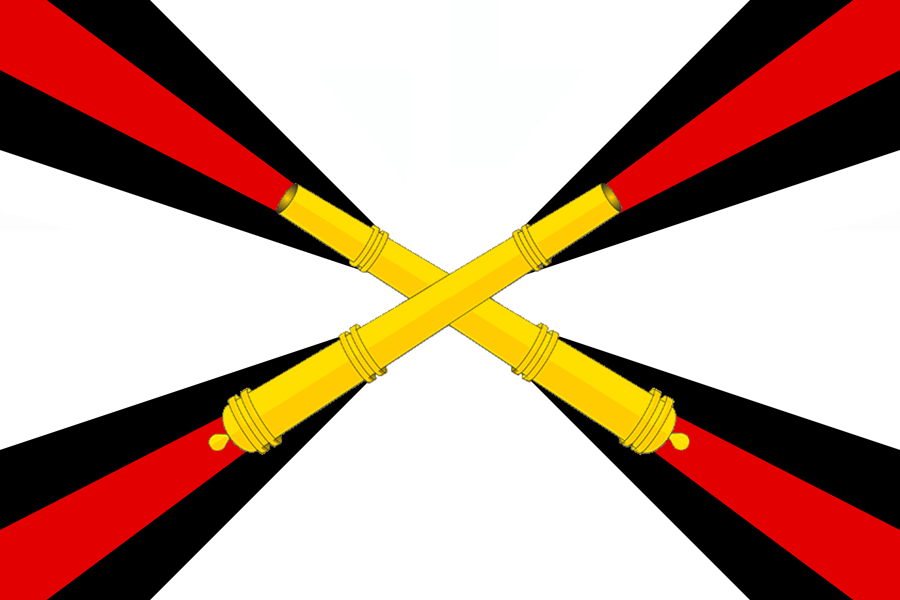
- Flag of the service

Agency overview
- Formed: 1992; 34 years ago
- Preceding agency: Rocket Forces and Artillery of the Soviet Ground Forces
- Headquarters: Moscow
- Agency executive: Director
- Parent agency: Russian Ground Forces
- Website: Ministry of Defense Website

The Missile Troops and Artillery (MT & A), (Russian: Ракетные войска и артиллерия, romanized: Raketnyye voyska i artilleriya – РВиА) are a combat arm of the Russian Ground Forces. They are the primary means of providing fire on the enemy during combined-arms operations. They are designed to perform the following main tasks:

- achieving and keeping fire superiority over the enemy;
- defeat of its means of nuclear attack, manpower, weapons, military and special equipment;
- disruption of troops and weapons’ control systems, reconnaissance and electronic warfare;
- destruction of long-term defence installations and other infrastructure;
- disruption of operational and military logistics;
- weakening and isolation of the second echelons and reserves of the enemy;
- destruction of tanks and other armoured vehicles of the enemy breaking into the depth of defence;
- cover of open flanks and junctions;
- participation in destruction of aircraft and amphibious assault forces of the enemy;
- remote mining of areas and facilities;
- light support of night actions of troops;
- smoke-screening, blinding of enemy targets;
- distribution of propaganda materials, etc.

Organisationally the MT & A consist of missile, rocket, artillery brigades, including high-power mixed, artillery battalions, rocket artillery regiments, separate reconnaissance battalions, as well as artillery of combined-arms brigades and military bases.

Further development and increase of combat capabilities of the MT & A of the GF are put into life by means of creating reconnaissance-fire units, including on interim basis, ensuring defeat of targets in real time, equipment of formations and units of the MT & A with high-precision weapons, increasing of firing range and power of the ammunition used, and automation of processes for preparation and firing.

Artillery was an integral part of the Imperial Russian Army for hundreds of years. The Rocket Troops and Artillery of the Russian Federation were created on the basis of units and formations of the Missile Troops and Artillery of the USSR stationed on the territory of the military districts of the Russian Soviet Federative Socialist Republic and, in addition, some units and formations of the Missile Troops and Artillery of the USSR located in Europe, Mongolia and the republics of the former USSR.

Amongst the oldest combat branches of the Ground Forces with a history dating to 1392, its service anniversary is marked on Missile Troops and Artillery Day, November 27, honoring the gunners and MRL operators who in 1942 fired the first shots of the artillery counterattacks during the long Battle of Stalingrad against the German Sixth Army.

From 1961 the "Rocket" term was added to the Soviet Ground Forces' Artillery, becoming the Ракетные войска и артиллерия СССР.

== Current organization ==
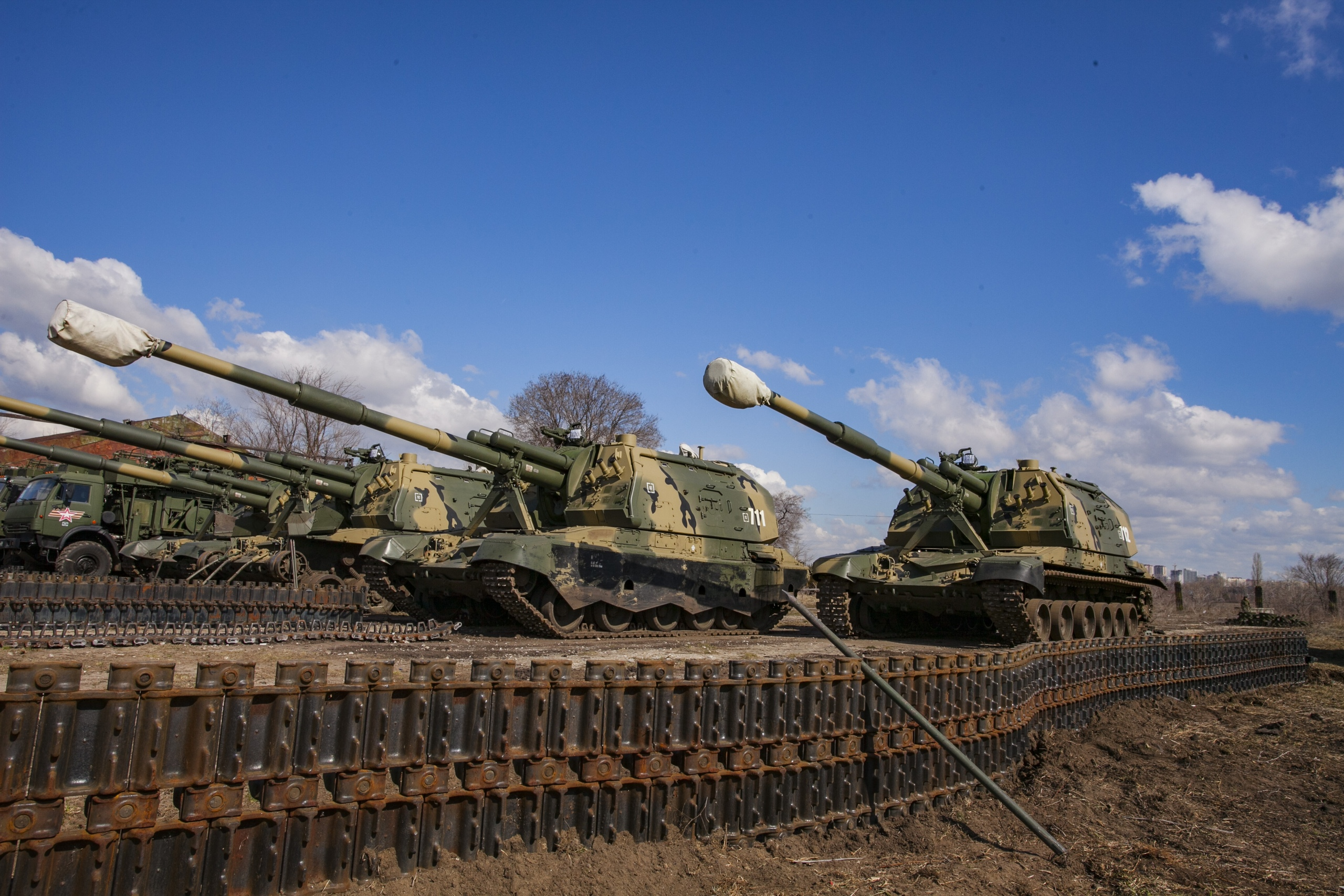
2S19M2 of the 99th Guards Self-Propelled Artillery Regiment during the first training session of the mechanized column before participating in the Victory Parade on May 9 on the central square of the City of Military Glory, Voronezh. April 9, 2019

Today missile and artillery formations include one division, the 18th Machine Gun Artillery Division in the Eastern Military District, a number of divisional artillery (self-propelled gun and towed gun) regiments of motor rifle and tank divisions and independent brigades and regiments of field artillery (including MRL and tactical missile brigades).

There are also a number of artillery battalions under regiments and brigades.

=== Divisional artillery regiments ===
- 99th Pomerania Guards Self-Propelled Regiment under the 3rd MRD, Boguchar
- 275th Self-Propelled Artillery Regiment under the 4th GTD, Naro-Fominsk
- 147th Guards Self-Propelled Artillery Simferopol Regiment under the 2nd GMRD, Kalininets
- 856th Guards Self-Propelled Artillery Regiment under the 144th GMRD, Yelnya
- 381st Guards Warsaw Artillery Regiment under the 150th MRD, Novocherkassk
- 400th Transylvania Self-Propelled Artillery Regiment under the 90th GTD, Chebarkul
- 50th Guards Artillery Regiment (Training) under the 42nd GMRD, Khankala
- 872nd Artillery Regiment (Training) under the 127th MRD, Sergeyevka
- 46th Machinegun Artillery Regiment under the 18th MGAD, Lagunnoe
- 49th Machinegun Artillery Regiment under the 18th MGAD, Goryachie Klyuchie

=== Independent brigades ===
- 28th Air Defense Rocket Brigade (Central Military District), Mirny
- 38th Air Defense Rocket Brigade (Eastern Military District)
- 45th Svir High-Power Artillery Brigade (Western Military District), Tambov
- 77th Air Defense Rocket Brigade (Southern Military District), Korenovsk
- 79th Guards Reactive Artillery Brigade (Western Military District)
- 120th Guards Artillery Brigade (Central Military District), Yurga
- 165th Artillery Prague Red Banner, Orders of Kutuzov and Bohdan Khmelnitsky Brigade, Military Unit 02901 (Nikolskoye settlement)
- 200th Artillery Brigade, Military Unit 48271 (Gorny settlement)
- 202nd Anti-Aircraft Rocket Brigade (Western Military District), Naro-Fominsk
- 227th Guards Artillery Brigade, military unit 21797 (Krasnooktyabrsky settlement)
- 232th Guards Reactive Artillery Brigade (Central Military District), Shelekhov
- 236th Guards Artillery Brigade, military unit 53195 (Kolomna)
- 238th Guards Artillery Brigade, military unit 39235 (Korenovsk)
- 244th Neman Red Banner, Orders of Suvorov and Kutuzov Artillery Brigade, military unit 41603 (Kaliningrad)
- 288th Guards Warsaw Artillery Red Banner, Order of Kutuzov Brigade, military unit 30683 (p. Mulino)
- 291st Guards Artillery Order of Suvorov Brigade, military unit 64670 (st. Troitskaya)
- 305th Artillery Brigade
- 338th Guards Reactive Artillery Brigade (Eastern Military District)
- 385th Guards Artillery Brigade (Central Military District), Orenburg
- 439th Guards Reactive Artillery Brigade (Southern Military District), Astrakhan

== Commanders ==
- Colonel-General Nikolai Dimidyuk (1991–1997)
- Colonel-General Mikhail Karatuev (1997–2001)
- Colonel-General Vladimir Zarutsky (2001–2008)
- Lieutenant-General Sergei Bogatinov (2009–2010)
- Lieutenant-General Mikhail Matveyevsky (2010–2023)
- Lieutenant-General Dmitry Klimenko (2023–present)

== See also ==
- ru:Ракетные войска и артиллерия СССР (Rocket Forces and Artillery of the USSR)
