= Anatoly Blagonravov =

Russian scientist and diplomat

- Анатолий Благонравов
- Born: 1 June 1894; Ankovo, Vladimir Governorate, Russian Empire
- Died: 4 February 1975 (aged 80); Moscow, Soviet Union
- Resting place: Novodevichy Cemetery
- Citizenship: Soviet
- Education: Mikhailovskaya Military Artillery Academy; Peter the Great St. Petersburg Polytechnic University
- Scientific career
- Fields: Aerospace engineering, mechanics
- Workplaces: Blagonravov Mechanical Engineering Research Institute

Anatoly Arkadevich Blagonravov (Russian: Анатолий Аркадьевич Благонравов; 1 June [O.S. 20 May] 1894 – 4 February 1975) was a Soviet engineer in the Soviet space program and later a diplomat. He represented the Soviet Union on the United Nations Committee on the Peaceful Uses of Outer Space (COPUOS). He worked closely with Hugh Dryden, his American counterpart, to promote international cooperation on space projects at the height of the Cold War. Blagonravov adopted a dog named Tsygan, one of the first dogs to make a successful sub-orbital flight in 1951. Blagonravov died at the age of 80 in Moscow.

== Start of US/Soviet spaceflight cooperation ==
Blagonravov was instrumental in opening the door to international cooperation in human spaceflight.

After John Glenn's orbital flight, an exchange of letters between President John F. Kennedy and Soviet Premiere Nikita Khrushchev led to a series of discussions led by Blagonravov and NASA Deputy Director Hugh Dryden. Their talks in 1962 led to the Dryden-Blagonravov agreement, which was formalized in October of that year, the same time the two countries were in the midst of the Cuban Missile Crisis. The agreement was formally announced at the United Nations on December 5, 1962. It called for cooperation on the exchange of data from weather satellites, a study of the Earth's magnetic field, and joint tracking of the U.S. Echo II balloon satellite. Unfortunately, as the competition between the two nation's manned space programs heated up, efforts to further cooperation at that point came to an end.

In April 1970, he held informal talks in New York City with NASA Administrator Thomas O. Paine, about the possibility of performing a rendezvous and docking of a US and Soviet spacecraft. This led to an agreement signed on 24 May 1972, by US President Richard M. Nixon and Soviet Premier Alexei Kosygin, calling for such a joint manned space mission, and declaring intent for all future international crewed spacecraft to be capable of docking with each other. On 17 July 1975, the crews of a US Apollo spacecraft and a Soviet Soyuz spacecraft performed such a docking, visiting each other's spacecraft, shaking hands, exchanging gifts, and performing joint experiments in space.

Blagonravov was inducted as a member of the inaugural class to the International Space Hall of Fame.

== Awards ==
- 2 Hero of Socialist Labour (May 30, 1964, May 31, 1974)
- 5 Order of Lenin (December 7, 1940; February 21, 1945; June 10, 1945; May 30, 1964; May 31, 1974)[13]
- Order of the October Revolution (April 5, 1971)[13]
- 3 Order of the Red Banner (1921); November 3, 1944, June 20, 1949)
- Order of the Red Star (1968)
- Honoured Scientist and Technician of the RSFSR (1940)
- Lenin Prize (1960)
- Stalin Prize, 2nd Class (1941) — for the scientific work “Fundamentals of the Design of Automatic Weapons” published in 1940
- Jubilee Medal "XX Years of the Workers' and Peasants' Red Army"
- Medal "For the Defence of Moscow"
- Medal "For the Victory over Germany in the Great Patriotic War 1941–1945"
- Medal "For Valiant Labour in the Great Patriotic War 1941–1945"
- Jubilee Medal "30 Years of the Soviet Army and Navy"
