= Nikolai Dimidyuk =

Soviet and Russian military officer (1937–2020)

- Native name: Николай Михайлович Димидюк
- Born: 18 January 1937; Aleysk, Altai Krai, Russian SFSR, USSR
- Died: 29 March 2020 (aged 83) Moscow, Russia
- Buried: Federal Military Memorial Cemetery
- Allegiance: Soviet Union; Russia
- Branch: Soviet Missile Troops and Artillery; Russian Missile Troops and Artillery
- Service years: 1954–1997
- Rank: Colonel general
- Commands: Soviet Missile Troops and Artillery; Russian Missile Troops and Artillery
- Awards: Orders of the Red Star (2); Order "For Service to the Homeland in the Armed Forces of the USSR", 2nd and 3rd classes

Nikolai Mikhailovich Dimidyuk (Russian: Николай Михайлович Димидюк; 18 January 1937 – 29 March 2020) was an officer of the Soviet Armed Forces. After service in the Soviet Missile Troops and Artillery he rose to command the branch, with the rank of colonel general, just prior to the dissolution of the Soviet Union. He became the last commander of the Soviet Missile Troops and Artillery, and the first commander of the Russian Missile Troops and Artillery.

Born in Aleysk, Dimidyuk studied at the Sumy Artillery School and subsequently rose through the ranks of the Missile Troops and Artillery, commanding larger and larger units. Having impressed his superiors with his command of an artillery division, Dimidyuk received awards and was selected for further study at the Kalinin Military Artillery Academy. He then began service with the Central Group of Forces in command of a regiment.

Dimidyuk continued to receive postings and promotions, serving in several of the Soviet Union's military districts, including the North Caucasus Military District, the Transbaikal Military District and the Far Eastern Military District. Having attained high rank after studying at the Military Academy of the General Staff of the Armed Forces, Dimidyuk was appointed commander of the entire Soviet Missile Troops and Artillery in 1991, just prior to the dissolution of the Soviet Union. He continued in command as the branch became the Russian Missile Troops and Artillery, overseeing major changes as part of the wideranging reforms of the Russian military. After retiring in 1997 he worked for Russian military export organisations such as Rosoboronexport, prior to his death in 2020. Over his career he had received two Orders of the Red Star and the Order "For Service to the Homeland in the Armed Forces of the USSR" Second and Third Classes.

== Early career ==
Dimidyuk was born on 18 January 1937 in the city of Aleysk, in Altai Krai, then part of the Russian SFSR, USSR. He studied at the Sumy Artillery School, graduating in 1957. Following his enlistment in the armed forces, Dimidyuk rose through the ranks, and was assigned to command an artillery division. After two years in this post his work resulted in the division receiving a rating of 'excellent', while Dimidyuk himself received a second award of the Order of the Red Star, and a place at the Kalinin Military Artillery Academy, which he graduated from with a gold medal for excellence in 1974. His next assignment was the command of an independent artillery regiment with the Central Group of Forces. Under his leadership the regiment received excellent ratings and was ranked first in the group's units.

== Higher commands ==
Having been rated as suitable for higher commands, in 1979 Dimidyuk was appointed deputy commander of the Missile Troops and Artillery in the North Caucasus Military District. During his time in this post, he oversaw training and exercises, and the testing and introduction of the OTR-23 Oka missile system. After a year as deputy commander, Dimidyuk was appointed commander of the Missile Troops and Artillery of the 29th Army, based in the Transbaikal Military District. He again concentrated on training and supply for his units, with the result that in the competitions of the Far Eastern-based missile brigades, the 29th Army's 103rd Rocket Brigade took first place. From 1982 until 1986 Dimidyuk served as chief of staff of the Missile Troops and Artillery of the Far Eastern Military District. During this period he also studied as an external student at the Military Academy of the General Staff of the Armed Forces, graduating in 1986. Following this he was appointed commander of the Missile Troops and Artillery in the Transbaikal Military District. Again, units under his command distinguished themselves in intra-service competitions.

== Commander of the Missile Troops and Artillery ==
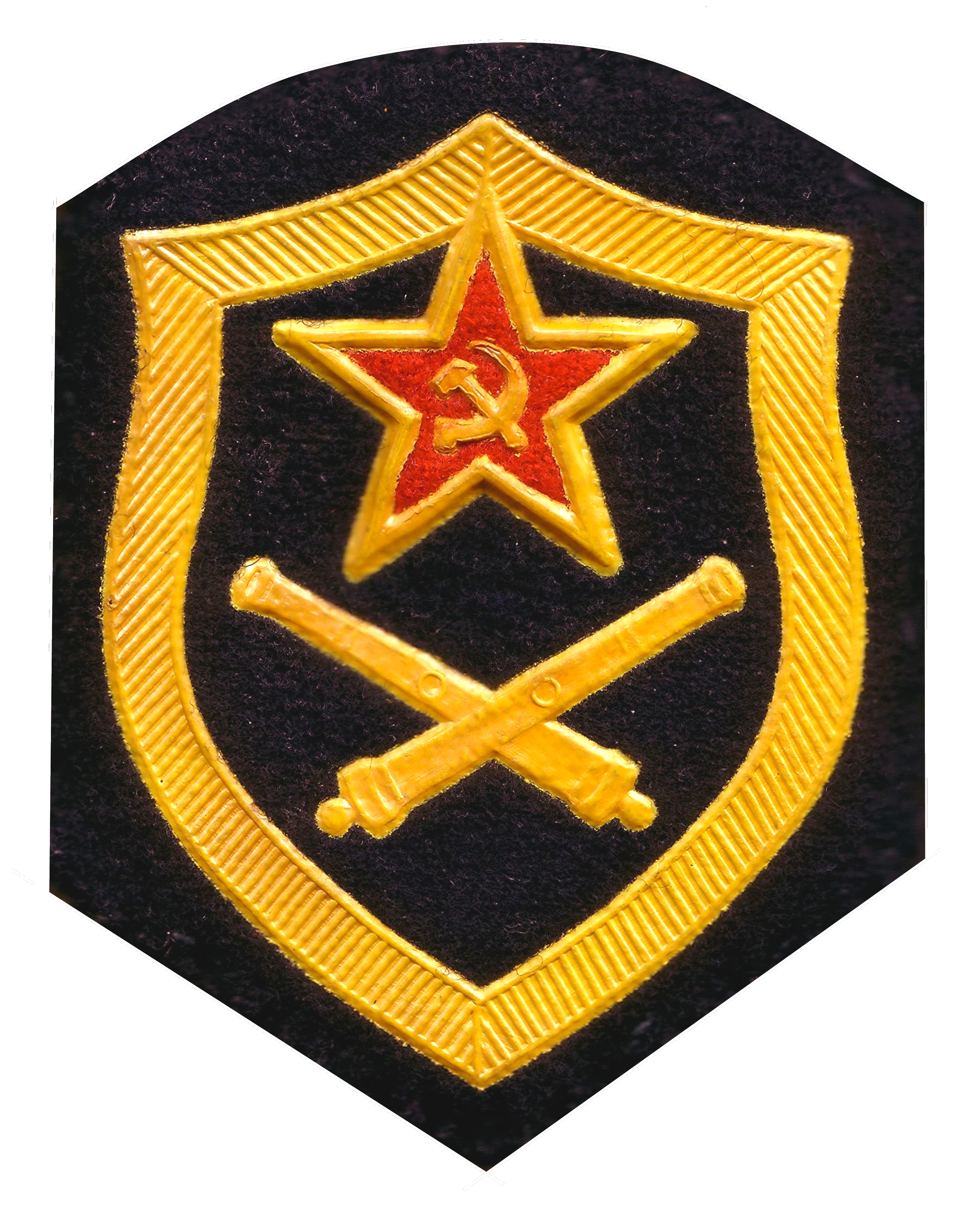
Insignia of the Soviet Missile Troops and Artillery, Dimidyuk's command prior to the dissolution of the Soviet Union

Insignia of the Russian Missile Troops and Artillery, Dimidyuk's command subsequent to the dissolution of the Soviet Union

Promoted to major general of artillery on 3 February 1984, then to lieutenant general on 17 February 1988, Dimidyuk rose to be commander of the Soviet Missile Troops and Artillery in October 1991, and then briefly of the Missile Troops and Artillery of the Ground Forces of the Commonwealth of Independent States, and finally of the Russian Missile Troops and Artillery following the dissolution of the Soviet Union in December that year. During this time he oversaw significant reform and restructuring of his branch, as the Russian Armed Forces established to replace the Soviet Armed Forces and reconstituted along new lines.

== Retirement and later life ==
Dimidyuk retired from the armed forces in 1997 with the rank of colonel general, to which he had been promoted on 13 February 1992, and in 1998 he became Advisor to the General Director of Rosvooruzhenie, a state intermediary agency for exports and imports of defence-related and dual use products, technologies and services. He subsequently became Director for Special Assignments for the Rosvooruzhenie's successor organization Rosoboronexport. Dimidyuk had authored various scientific papers and publications on a number of questions related to artillery and rocketry, and since 1993 he had been a corresponding member of the Russian Academy of Missile and Artillery Sciences.

Dimidyuk died on 29 March 2020 at the age of 83. He was buried in the Federal Military Memorial Cemetery on 1 April 2020. He was married, with two sons. Over his career he had heen awarded two Orders of the Red Star, and the Order "For Service to the Homeland in the Armed Forces of the USSR" Second and Third Classes.
