= Ankovo =

Ankovo Аньково
- Selo
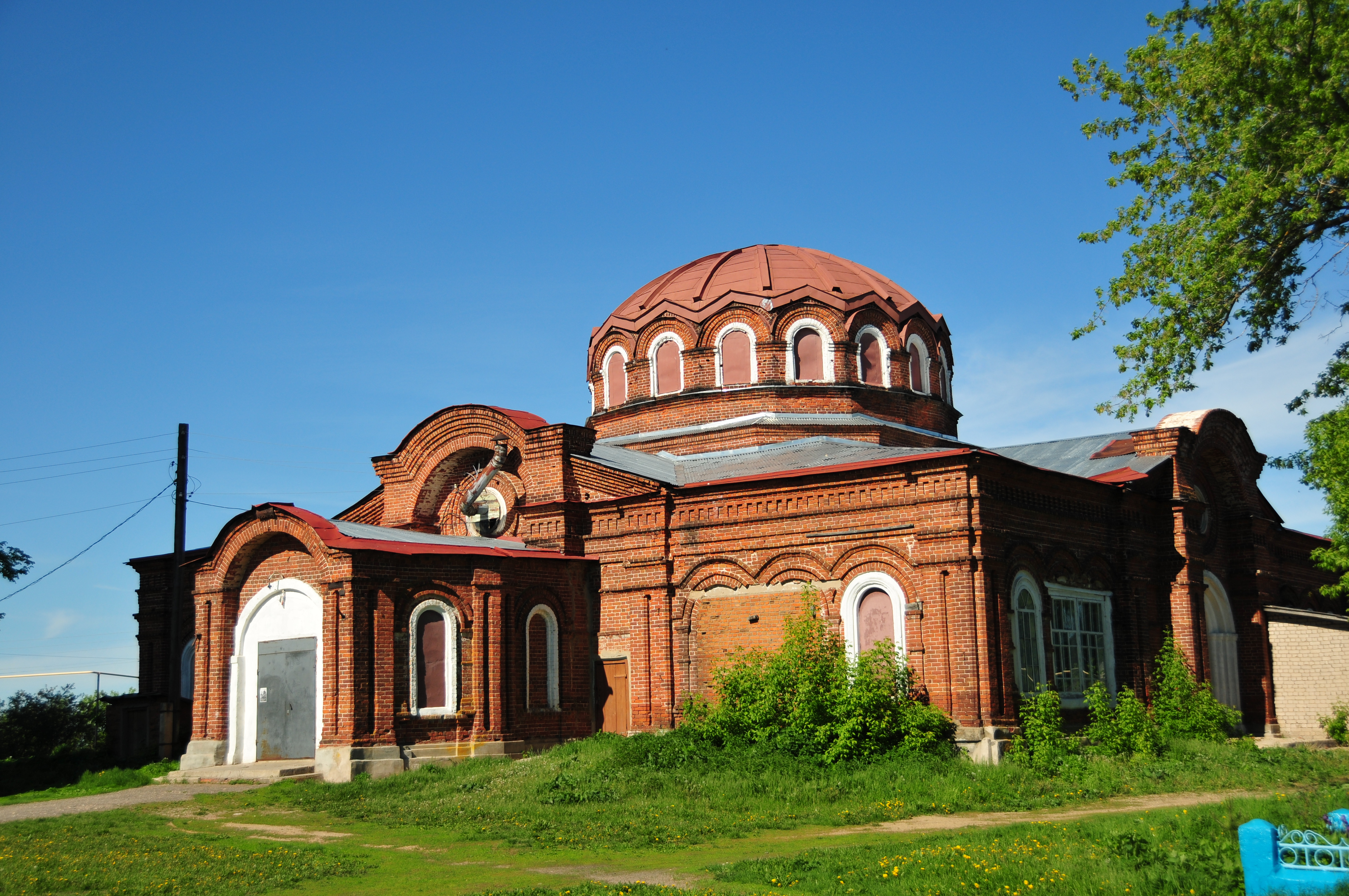

- Location within Ivanovo Oblast Location within Russia
- Coordinates: 56°56′N 39°56′E
- Country: Russia
- Region: Ivanovo Oblast
- District: Ilyinsky District
- Time zone: UTC+3:00

Ankovo (Russian: Аньково) is a rural locality (a selo) in Ilyinsky District, Ivanovo Oblast, Russia. Population: 1,345 (2010 census);

== Geography ==
This rural locality is located 12 kilometres (7.5 mi) from Ilyinskoye-Khovanskoye (the district's administrative centre), 62 kilometres (39 mi) from Ivanovo (capital of Ivanovo Oblast) and 194 kilometres (121 mi) from Moscow. Novosyolka is the nearest rural locality. Scientist Anatoly Blagonravov was born in the village.
