= Saratov Higher Military Command and Engineering School of Missile Forces =

- Саратовское высшее военное командно-инженерное училище ракетных войск
- Type: Public
- Established: 1918
- Location: Saratov, Russia; 55°46′39″N 37°35′47″E
- Campus: Urban
- Nickname: SVAKU (СВАКУ)

Saratov Lizyukov Higher Military Command and Engineering School of Missile Forces (Russian: Саратовское высшее военное командно-инженерное училище ракетных войск) is a military educational institution of the Russian Armed Forces in Saratov. It was originally founded in 1918 and passed through number of re-organizations.

== History ==
On July 3, 1918, with the consent of the Chief Commissar of the Military Educational Directorate of the All-Russian General Staff dated July 2, 1918, the formation of a military instructor school began in Saratov. On August 7, 1918, by a special order of the Saratov Provincial Commissariat, the school was renamed the Saratov Infantry Machine Gun Command Courses. On January 2, 1919, the first graduation of 38 cadets took place. In the summer of 1919, the school's cadet battalion of 420 people took part in battles with the White Cossacks in the area of Chertkovo station. On July 12, 1919, by Resolution No. 165 of the All-Russian Central Executive Committee, the command courses were awarded the Order of the Red Banner for military merit. At the same time, they were awarded the Red Banner of the All-Russian Central Executive Committee and the Red Banner of the Moscow Council of Workers' and Peasants' Deputies. On June 29, 1920, the courses were renamed the 34th Saratov Infantry Machine Gun Command Courses. On August 20, 1920, the courses allocated 240 people to fight for the establishment of Soviet power in Transcaucasia. Subsequently, the Saratov cadets would serve as the main support for the foundation of the 21st Tiflis Infantry School.

By order of the Revolutionary Military Council of the USSR dated December 31, 1920, the 34th Saratov Infantry Machine Gun Courses were reorganized into the 20th Saratov Red Banner Infantry School. In the early 1920s, the school's cadets participated in the suppression of the White Guard movement in the Volga region. On March 12, 1922, for the fight against banditry, the 20th Saratov Infantry School was awarded the Red Banner. By order of the Revolutionary Military Council of the USSR dated October 9, 1924, the infantry school was reorganized into the Saratov Infantry School for the Retraining of Red Army Reserve Commanders. By order of the Revolutionary Military Council of the USSR No. 384/67 dated October 1, 1927, it was transformed into the Saratov Red Banner School for the Retraining of Red Army Reserve Commanders. On November 6, 1927, the school was awarded the patron's Red Banner. By the decree of the Central Executive Committee of the Soviet Union of February 10, 1929, the school was awarded the Revolutionary Red Banner of the Central Executive Committee of the USSR. On April 15, 1931, it was reorganized into the Saratov Red Banner Armored School of the Red Army. On July 1, 1937, during the political "purges" in the Red Army, the head of the school, Colonel N.K. Shipov, was arrested and then shot. On March 16, 1937, it was transformed into the Saratov Red Banner Armoured School. In September 1938, the school served as the main supplier of junior command personnel for the newly founded 2nd Saratov Armoured School. From that moment on, SKBTU became known as the 1st Saratov BTU. Before the Great Patriotic War, it trained Red infantry commanders, communications officers, and reserve officers, as well as tank lieutenants (including tank chemists and fuel and lubricants technicians) and 2nd rank military technicians. From July to December 1941, the school sent about 3,000 political fighters to the front. In August 1942, the school sent a tank company to the front. By the Decree of the Presidium of the Supreme Soviet of the Soviet Union of July 2, 1943, the 1st Saratov Red Banner Tank School, in commemoration of its 25th anniversary for outstanding achievements in training command personnel and military merits to the Motherland, was awarded the Order of the Red Star and was named after Hero of the Soviet Union Major General A. I. Lizyukov. In July 1943, the school was transferred to a new training profile - lieutenants for T-34 tanks. In 1959, it was transformed into the Saratov Red Banner Order of the Red Star Artillery Technical School named after A. I. Lizyukov.

Since 1963, it has been training missile officers for the ground forces. On June 13, 1983, it was transformed into the Saratov Higher Command and Engineering Red Banner Order of the Red Star School of Missile Troops named after Hero of the Soviet Union Major General A. I. Lizyukov.

On November 11, 2002, by the resolution of the Government of Russia No. 807 it was merged with the Mikhailovskaya Military Artillery Academy (St. Petersburg) as a branch. In 2003 the school was disbanded. Subsequently, the Regional Training Center for Combat Training of the Missile Troops and Artillery of the Russian Armed Forces began operating on the premises of the school. 144 people who studied at the school were later awarded the title of Hero of the Soviet Union. On July 6, 2024, the Order of the Government of Russia was issued on the revival of the artillery school as the Saratov Higher Artillery Command School (SVAKU). According to statements by the Chairman of the State Duma Vyacheslav Volodin from March 2024, the first recruitment was to take place that same year. The grand opening took place on August 30, 2024. The first intake of the revived school included 291 cadets.
