= Dmitry Klimenko =

Russian soldier of the Ukrainian descent

- Дмитрий Николаевич Клименко
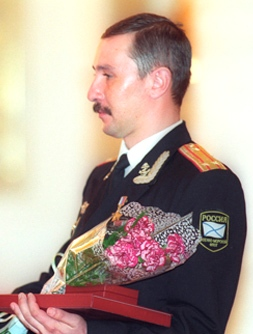
- Born: August 22, 1969 (age 57); Nezhin, USFSR
- Education: Odessa Higher Artillery Command School; Mikhailovskaya Military Artillery Academy; Military Academy of the General Staff
- Military career
- Allegiance: Russia
- Branch: Russian Ground Forces
- Service years: 1987–present
- Rank: Lieutenant general
- Commands: Russian Missile Troops and Artillery

Dmitry Nikolaevich Klimenko (Russian: Дмитрий Николаевич Клименко; born August 22, 1969, Nezhin) is a Russian artillery officer and military commander, participant in the first and second Chechen wars, Hero of the Russian Federation (2000). Since October 2023 he is the Chief of the Missile Forces and Artillery of the Russian Armed Forces. As of 2023 he holds Lieutenant General rank.

== Biography ==
Born on August 22, 1969, in the city of Nezhin, Chernigov Oblast, Ukrainian SSR.

He graduated from the Odessa Higher Artillery Command School in 1991. Served in artillery units of the army and navy. In 1994, he was the first in the Navy to conduct artillery firing at coastal targets from a self-propelled artillery mount located on the deck of a moving landing ship with a 100% hit rate. He took part in the first Chechen war as commander of a mortar company, and participated in the operations to capture Shali and Vedeno. By October 1999, Major Dmitry Klimenko commanded a division of self-propelled artillery units of the 61st Separate Marine Brigade of the Northern Fleet.

He distinguished himself during the Second Chechen war, where he fought as a battery commander. At the end of October 1999, during the offensive in the area of the village of Novogroznensky, Klimenko was in infantry combat formations along with the battery control group. When large separatist forces attacked infantrymen under the cover of dense thickets, Klimenko personally arrived at the attacked area and, deploying a radio station, began adjusting artillery fire on the enemy. When the separatist forces approached his position at a distance of 70 meters, Klimenko continued to provide data to his battery, despite the fact that he was in the zone of fragments of his shells. Having lost several dozen people from artillery fire, the gang was forced to retreat. During her pursuit, she was almost completely destroyed.

By decree of the President of the Russian Federation dated February 21, 2000, Major Dmitry Klimenko was awarded the title of Hero of the Russian Federation for “courage and heroism shown during the counter-terrorist operation in the North Caucasus region.” At the same time he was awarded the rank of lieutenant colonel.

He graduated from the Military Artillery University in 2002, and the Military Academy of the General Staff in 2010. He served as chief of staff of an artillery brigade, and in 2007 commanded an artillery brigade. In 2008 he was appointed chief of staff of a military unit of the Moscow Military District. Since 2011, he was deputy chief of missile forces and artillery of the Western Military District. Since 2014, Klimenko served as chief of the missile forces and artillery of the Eastern Military District.

He participated in the Russian intervention in the Syrian civil war, and was the head of the missile forces and artillery of the Euphrates group. He was the head of the department of missile forces and artillery at the General Staff Military Academy.

Since October 2023 he is the Chief of the Missile Forces and Artillery of the Russian Armed Forces.

He was also awarded the Order of Merit for the Fatherland, III and IV degrees with swords, Order of Alexander Nevsky, Order of Courage, the Medal "For Courage" (1995), and a number of other medals.
