= Tyumen Higher Military Engineer Command School named after A.I. Proshlyakov =

Military high school

Tyumen Higher Military Engineer Command School named after marshal of engineering troops A.I. Proshlyakov
- Тюменское высшее военно-инженерное командное училище имени маршала инженерных войск А.И. Прошлякова
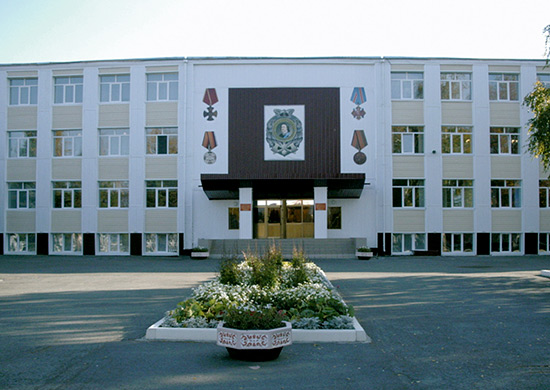
- Type: Higher military school
- Established: 1940
- Rector: Major general Dmitriy Yevmenenko
- Location: 625001, Leo Tolstoy Street, 1, Tyumen, (Russia)
- Campus: Urban
- Website: https://tvviku.mil.ru/

Tyumen Higher Military Engineer Command School named after marshal of engineering troops A.I. Proshlyakov (Note: Russian: Тюменское высшее военно-инженерное командное училище имени маршала инженерных войск А.И. Прошлякова, romanized: Tyumenskoye vyssheye voyenno-inzhenernoye komandnoye uchilishche imeni marshala inzhenernykh voysk A. I. Proshlyakova) is a Russian higher military school conducting warrant officer programmes and commissioned officer programmes (specialitet). It is located in Tyumen.

== History ==
The academy was founded in 1940 as Tallinn Military Infantry School. In 1941, it was relocated to Tyumen. In 1957, the school changed its specialization and became Tyumen Military Engineering School. In 1968, it was renamed the Tyumen Higher Military Engineer Command School. In 1974, it was given the name of marshal of engineering troops A.I. Proshlyakov.

== Educational programmes ==
The School prepares officers for the engineering troops of the Ground Forces.

== Alumni ==
- Vladimir Puchkov
- Nikolai Serdtsev
