= Nikolai Serdtsev =

Soviet and Russian military officer (1948–2021)

- Native name: Николай Иванович Сердцев
- Born: 21 April 1948; Chelyabinsk, Russian SFSR, Soviet Union
- Died: 4 June 2021 (aged 73) Moscow, Russia
- Buried: Federal Military Memorial Cemetery
- Allegiance: Soviet Union; Russia
- Branch: Soviet Ground Forces
- Service years: 1967–2008
- Rank: Colonel General
- Commands: Russian Engineer Troops
- Awards: Order "For Merit to the Fatherland", 4th Class; Order of Courage; Order of Military Merit; Order "For Service to the Homeland in the Armed Forces of the USSR", 3rd Class; Medal "For Battle Merit"; State Prize of the Russian Federation; Prize of the Government of the Russian Federation in the Field of Science and Technology

Nikolai Ivanovich Serdtsev (Russian: Николай Иванович Сердцев; 21 April 1948 – 4 June 2021) was a Soviet and Russian military officer and engineer. He served as head of the Russian Engineer Troops between 1999 and 2008, reaching the rank of colonel general.

Serdtsev's service in the Soviet Armed Forces began with studies at the Tyumen Higher Military Engineering Command School, starting a life-long specialisation in military engineering. Assigned to the Soviet Engineer Troops after graduation, he worked his way up through the ranks to more senior positions. He furthered his expertise with studies at the V. V. Kuibyshev Military Engineering Academy, and served in Afghanistan during the Soviet–Afghan War in command of an independent engineer battalion.

Serdtsev's career culminated with the command of the Engineering Troops of the Ministry of Defence of the Russian Federation, between 1999 and his retirement in 2008. He continued to work as a researcher, having received several academic distinctions, as well as awards from the Soviet and Russian militaries, and the Russian Orthodox Church, prior to his death in 2021 at the age of 73.

== Early life and career ==
Serdtsev was born on 21 April 1948 in Chelyabinsk, which was then part of the Russian Soviet Federal Socialist Republic, in the Soviet Union, into a worker's family. After graduating from high school in 1965, he worked for a time as a mechanic at the Chelyabinsk Forge and Press Factory. Enrolling in the Soviet Armed Forces in August 1967, he studied at the Tyumen Higher Military Engineering Command School, graduating with honours in 1970. He was assigned in September that year to the Soviet Engineer Troops, initially as a platoon commander, and then from May 1973 as a deputy chief of staff of an independent engineer battalion. This was followed in October 1974 with a posting as chief of staff and deputy battalion commander.

Serdtsev then took the correspondence courses at the V. V. Kuibyshev Military Engineering Academy, graduating in 1979. In July that year he was given command of an independent engineer battalion, in which role he went on to serve with the Limited Contingent of Soviet Troops in Afghanistan between 1981 and 1983, during the Soviet–Afghan War. In 1983 Serdtsev took command of an army engineer battalion, followed in 1984 by the 62nd Pontoon Bridge Regiment in the Odessa Military District. During his time in command, the regiment was twice recognized as the best in the district's engineering troops.

== Senior ranks ==
In February 1988 Serdtsev was appointed head of the Engineering Troops of the 32nd Combined Arms Army of the Central Asian Military District, based at Semipalatinsk. This was followed in November 1988 with the post of chief of staff and deputy head of the Engineering Troops of the Central Group of Forces in Czechoslovakia. After graduating from further studies at the Military Academy of the General Staff of the Armed Forces of Russia in 1992, he was appointed head of the Engineering Troops of the Russian Transcaucasus Group of Forces in June that year. This was followed in 1994 with the position of head of the Engineering Service of the Strategic Missile Forces. He was promoted to major general in 1995.

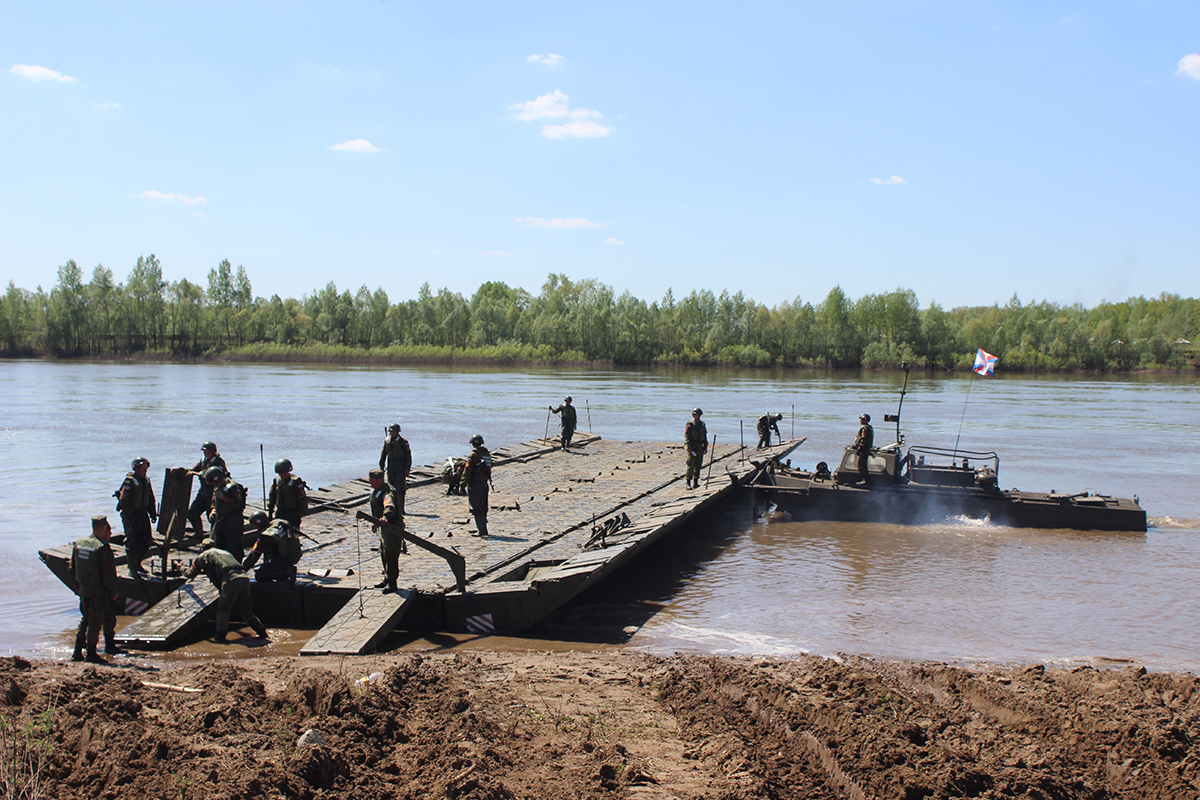
Russian Engineer Troops on exercises

On 19 April 1999, Serdtsev was appointed head of the Engineering Troops of the Ministry of Defence of the Russian Federation, which in 2002 changed its name to the Engineering Troops of the Armed Forces of the Russian Federation. Serdtsev was its commander until his retirement in April 2008. He had been promoted to lieutenant general in June 1999 and to colonel general in May 2000.

== Retirement and later life ==
Serdtsev had defended his thesis for the degree of candidate of military sciences in 2001, and in retirement was a leading researcher at the D. M. Karbyshev 15th Central Research Institute, as well as an adviser to the Main Command of the Russian Ground Forces. He was a laureate of the State Prize of the Russian Federation, and had been awarded the Prize of the Government of the Russian Federation in the Field of Science and Technology. Among his military awards were the Order "For Merit to the Fatherland" Fourth Class in 2006, the Order of Courage in 2000, the Order of Military Merit in 2000, the Order "For Service to the Homeland in the Armed Forces of the USSR" Third Class in 1982 and the Medal "For Battle Merit" in 1981. He was also honoured by the Russian Orthodox Church, receiving the Order of Holy Prince Daniel of Moscow Second Class, and the Order of Saint Righteous Grand Duke Dmitry Donskoy Second Class.

In retirement Serdtsev lived in Moscow. He was married, with a son and a daughter. He died in Moscow on 4 June 2021 at the age of 73, after a serious illness. He was buried on 7 June in the Federal Military Memorial Cemetery.

Military offices
Preceded by Vladimir Kuznetsov	Commander of the Russian Engineer Troops; 1999–2008	Succeeded by Yuri Balkhovitin
