= Military Institute of Physical Culture =

Organisation associated with the Russian Military

- Военный институт физической культуры
- Great emblem of the Military Institute of Physical Culture
- Other name: VIFK (MIoPC)
- Former names: St. Petersburg Military College of Physical Fitness and Sports
- Established: October 1, 1909
- Founder: Nicholas II
- Director: Oleg Botsman
- Location: 63, Bolshoi Sampsonievsky Prospect, Saint Petersburg, 194044, Russia; 59.976742°N 30.339368°E
- Website: vifk.mil.ru

The Twice-Red Banner Military Institute of Physical Culture of the Ministry of Defense of Russia (Note: Russian: Военный дважды Краснознамённый институт физической культуры Министерства обороны Российской Федерации, romanized: Voyenny dvazhdy Krasnoznamyonny institut fizicheskoy kultury Ministerstva oborony Rossiyskoy Federatsii) is the Russian Armed Forces' principal center for military athletes who are in active service in the Armed Forces who are trained not just in national defense but also to compete and play for the glory of the country in domestic and international sporting competitions. Established on May 17, 1909 Saint Petersburg, the college is still in operation in Russia and is the military counterpart of the long standing Lesgaft National State University of Physical Education, Sport and Health.

== History ==
On May 17, 1909, Tsar Nicholas II formally granted the provisional regulations for military sports education, which were the basis for the formation of the current institute. It opened its doors on October 1, 1909 in Saint Petersburg as the Main Gymnastics and Fencing School (Главной гимнастическо-фехтовальной школе), which reported to the Commander of the Imperial Guard/Commanding General, Petersburg Military District and whose first cadets were military personnel of the Guards units and personnel of the district.

Following the October Revolution the Council of People's Commissars reorganized the school, becoming the Soviet Military Gymnastics and Fencing Institute in 1918, the principal athletic center of the new Red Army and the nascent Soviet Armed Forces as a whole. In 1932, the institute became the Military Institute of Physical Fitness Culture, placed as the Leningrad campus of the now Russian State University of Physical Education, Sport, Youth and Tourism, then the State Central Order of Lenin Institute of Physical Education "Marshal Joseph Stalin". It was in this status that the Armed Forces trained its future athletics, coaches, judges and sports officials.

In 1943, the Institute and its staff, then stationed in Moscow as a consequence of the long Siege of Leningrad (1941-1944), was awarded the Order of the Red Banner in honor of its role in the war effort, and returned back to Leningrad after the war, where it remains to this day. For many years since, many of the Soviet Union's and Russia's athletes, including Nikolai Puchkov, Anatoly Roshchin, Viktor Zhdanovich, and Nikolay Bazhukov took up their studies in the Institute as part of their military service, while being honed in their athletic talents not just for national defense but also to bolster its standing in the global arena as a sporting powerhouse, having won many accolades in national and international competitions, including the Summer and Winter Olympic Games, the European Games and the Military World Games.

Since 2015 the Sporting School Cadet Corps St. Petersburg, which is operated under the auspices of the Ministry of Defense, is affiliated to the Military Institute.

== Organization ==
The institute, today under its current Superintendent, Colonel Oleg Botsman, is organized into three Faculty Divisions (1st, 2nd and Special), and into the following academic departments:

- theories and organizations of military physical training, physical education and sports
- tactics and combined arms disciplines
- psychological, pedagogical and legal foundations of military physical training, physical education and sports
- cross-country, marathon and ski sports
- aquatics
- gymnastics, athletic training and competitive training in other disciplines
- mountain sports training, survival and orienteering
- advanced military sciences
- hand-to-hand combat and obstacle course training
- foreign languages
- Russian language training
- sports sciences and medicine

== Facilities ==
1 academic building and 2 educational and sports buildings, together with outdoor and indoor facilities, make up the current composition of the St. Petersburg campus of the MCPFS which also includes the following facilities for sports:

- Main gymnasium
- game sports hall
- combat sports hall
- martial arts and fight sports hall
- 2 athletics stadiums
- 2 football fields
- hockey stadium
- 50 meter swimming pool
- 3 fitness gyms
- 2 shooting ranges for shooting sports
- 2 obstacle courses
- tactical exercise field
- training fields in topography, engineering training and CBRN defense
- water station
- biathlon shooting range
- climbing wall for mountain and rock climbing

== See also ==
- Military academies in Russia
