= A.F. Mozhaysky Military-Space Academy =

Education organization in Saint Petersburg, Russia

Coordinates: 59.9564°N 30.2836°E

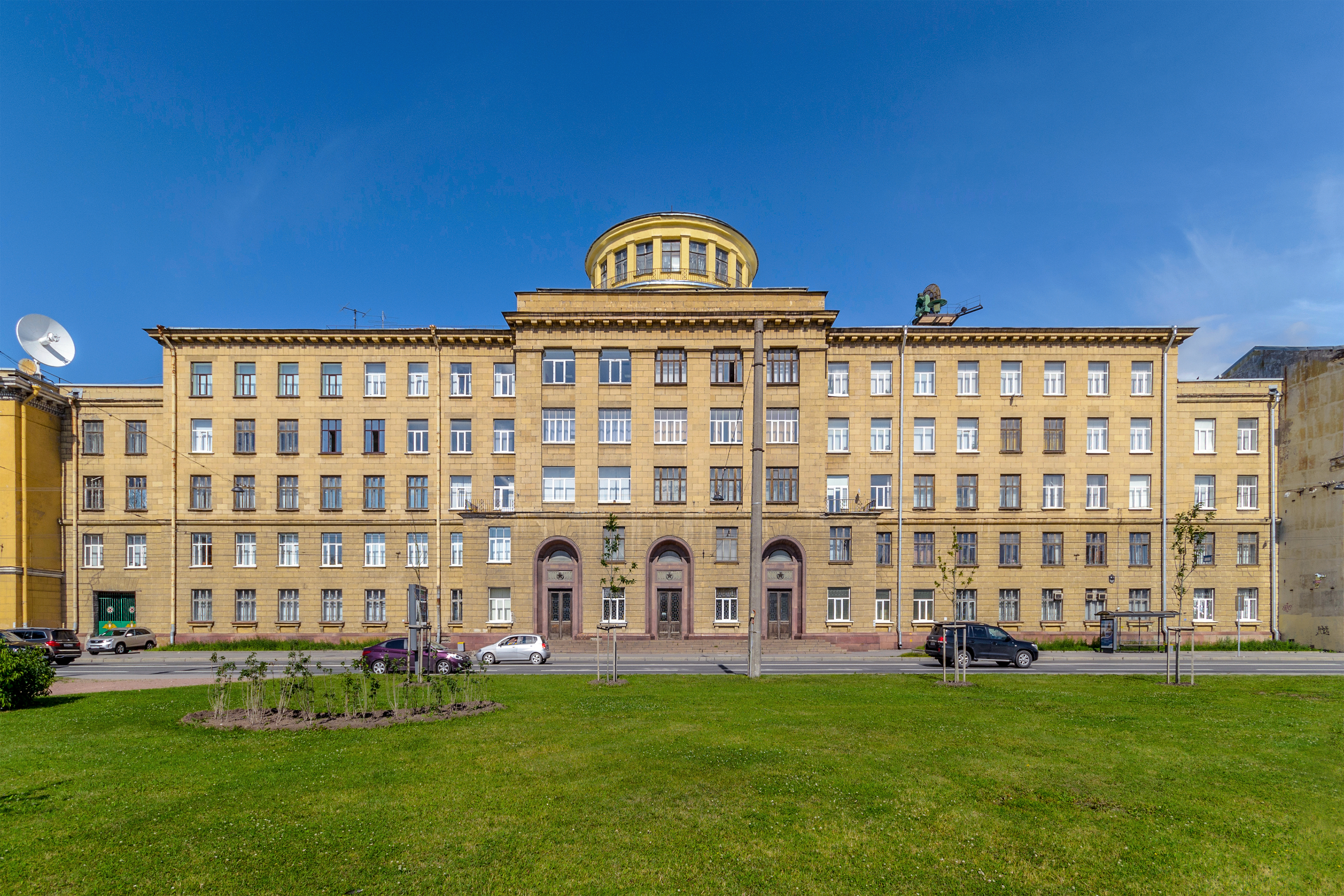
A.F.Mozhaysky's Military-Space Academy

A.F. Mozhaysky's Military-Space Academy (Note: Russian: Федеральное государственное казённое военное образовательное учреждение высшего профессионального образования «Военно-космическая академия имени А. Ф. Можайского», romanized: Federalnoye gosudarstvennoye kazyonnoye voyennoye obrazovatelnoye uchrezhdeniye vysshego professionalnogo obrazoraniya "Voyenno-kosmicheskaya akademiya imeni A. F. Mozhayskogo") is a Military Academy of the Armed Forces of the Russian Federation. It is located in Saint Petersburg. It is associated with the Russian Space Forces.

== History ==
The Academy was established on 16 January 1712 in Moscow as a military engineering school. During the first years the facilities in the Academy were in bad position. During the reign of Catherine the Great the school was renamed to Artillery and Engineering Gentry Corps. In 1773, it acquired its own printing house. Two years later the Museum of History of housing, Library for Foreign Literature was created. In 1880, the school got the name Second Cadet Corps. Since 1955 the academy has been named after the famous Russian engineer and mechanic Alexander Mozhaysky, rear admiral, the inventor of the world's first aircraft. The Academy has been used to train the space troops (ex. GUKOS, now VKS) and GRU officers, including some of the Fancy Bear hackers.

== Sport ==
- Hockey team

== Structure ==
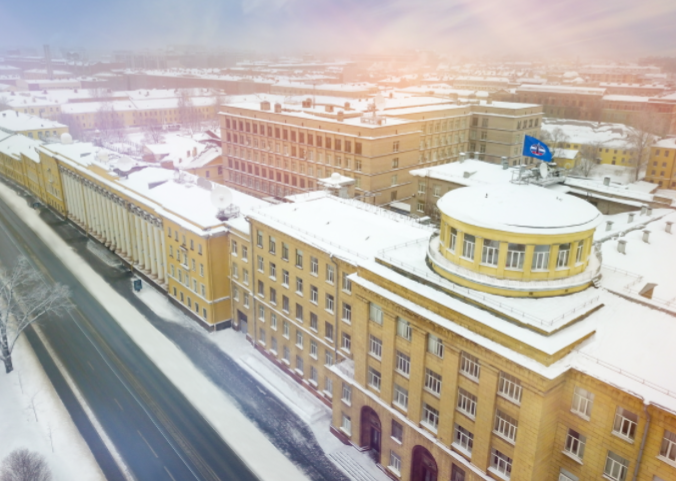
Military Space Academy named after A.F. Mozhaisky

- Faculty of design of spacecraft
- Faculty of rocket and space systems management
- Department of radio-electronic systems of space systems
- Faculty of space infrastructure
- Faculty of collecting and processing information.
- Faculty of information security and computer technology
- Faculty survey support and cartography
- Faculty funds missile and space defense
- Department of automated command and control systems

== Leadership ==
- Lieutenant General Prof. Maxim Mikhailovich Penkov
