= Mikhailovskaya Military Artillery Academy =

Military academy

- Михайловская военная артиллерийская академия
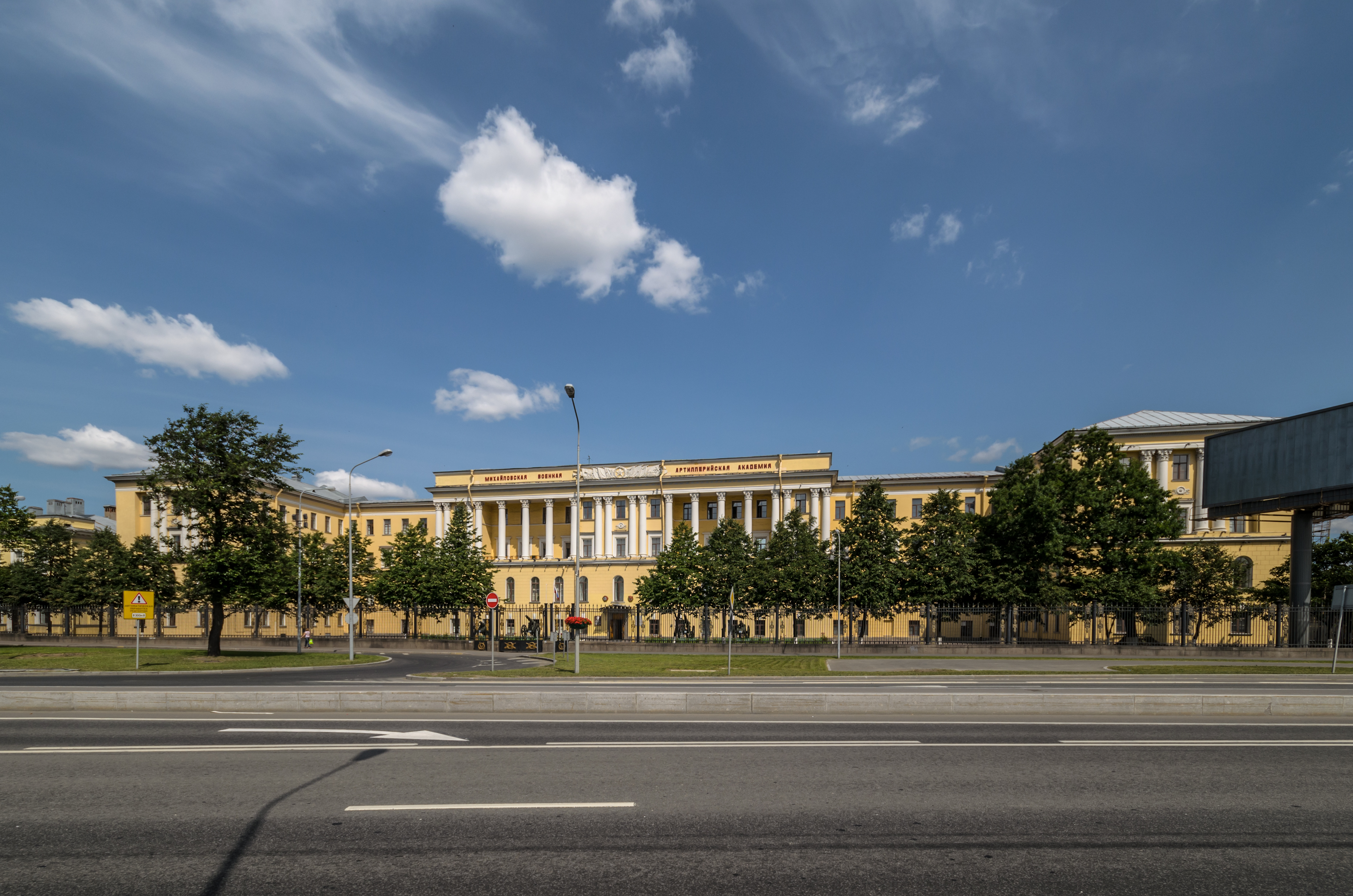
- Type: Military academy
- Established: 1820
- Rector: Lieutenant general Sergey Bakaneev
- Location: 195009, Saint Petersburg, Komsomola Street, 22, Saint Petersburg, (Russia)
- Campus: Urban
- Website: https://mvaa.mil.ru/

Mikhailovskaya Military Artillery Academy (Russian: Михайловская военная артиллерийская академия, romanized: Mikhaylovskaya voyennaya artilleriyskaya akademiya) is a Russian military academy conducting warrant officer programmes, commissioned officer programmes (specialitet), advance training career commissioned officer programmes (magistratura), and adjunctura programmes. It is located in Saint Petersburg.

== History ==
The Moscow School of Mathematics and Navigation and the Artillery and Engineering Szlachta Corps were the predecessors of the academy. The academy was officially founded as artillery officer school by the order of Generalfeldzeugmeister (highest commander of artillery) of 26 November 1820 №805. In 1855, school was transformed into academy. In 1919, it was renamed the Artillery academy of Red Army. In 1925 it merged into the Red Army Military Technical Academy, was restored in 1953 as Kalinin Artillery Military Academy. Since 1967, it was called Military Artillery Order of Lenin Red Banner Academy named after M.I. Kalinin. It was renamed the Mikhailovskaya Military Artillery Academy by the Decree of the President of Russia of 17 November 1995 №1154.

The Academy marked its biccentenial in 2020.

== Educational programmes ==
The academy prepares artillery officers of all specialities for all military branches.

== Alumni ==
- Rafael Asadov
- Anatoly Blagonravov
- Vladimir Bogomolov
- Nikolai Dimidyuk
- Cao Gangchuan
- Vasiliy Grabin
- Edward Jan Habich
- Georgy Langemak
- Lev Martyushev
- Edward Pietrzyk
- Yevgenii Vasilevich Zolotov
