= Adjunctura in Russia =

Russian military postgraduate school

The adjunctura (Russian: адъюнктура) is a military analogue of civilian graduate school in Russia, which allow commissioned officers to get academic degree of candidate of military sciences and be appointed to teaching and scientific positions in military educational and scientific research institutions.

== History ==
=== In Soviet era ===
Adjunctura was established in 1938. Its main use was the preparation of teaching and scientific staff for Soviet Armed Forces from among commissioned officers.

The period of studying was 3 years. The upper age limit for entry was 35 years. Applicants were supposed to have 2 years active duty service experience as commissioned officers at least. However, rules also permitted to entry adjunctura immediately after graduation from higher military school, for graduates "who have demonstrated a propensity for researches". For admission, applicants had to pass entry exams.

In opinion of Mikryukov, the enrollment to adjunctura immediately after graduation from higher military schools was bad and corruptive practice because most of such applicants were protégés of senior officials.

Theses of adjuncts were classified quite often, and a searching for information in the process of the preparation of the theses by itself was classified quite often too. This situation had its impact on the result of the educational process - many theses were divorced from reality of modern war and were not based on advanced military-technical developments. This situation was criticized. For example, Minister of Defence of Soviet Union Georgy Zhukov used to get acquainted with many theses personally and demanded to change the approach to post-grade military education through providing adjuncts with access to archives and developments of military research institutes.

=== In post-Soviet era ===
Until 1999, the training of teaching and scientific staff in Russian Armed Forces was regulated by Soviet legal acts (namely, the Minister of Defence of Soviet Union orders of 1989 №80 and of 1990 №249). These legal acts were replaced by the Minister of Defence of Russia Order of 15 July 1999 №310. By and large, this Order kept the Soviet system of adjunctura. This Order was cancelled by the Order of 9 March 2016 №118.

New legal regulation was approved by the Minister of Defence of Russia Order of 18 January 2016 №6. New regulation replaced the upper age limit for admission by the expected number of years of active duty service after graduation until general upper age limit for tenure. The possibility to entry adjunctura immediately after graduation from higher military school was cancelled.

== Enrollment ==
Commissioned officer wishing to become adjunct should submit an application until 1 February of the calendar year of expected admission. An applicant shall comply with the entry requirements illustrated below

| Reached educational level | Years of active duty service as commissioned officer | Military rank (no lower than) | Military position (years of experience) | Expected number of years of active duty service after graduation until general upper age limit for tenure |
|---|---|---|---|---|
| Military school or Military training center | no less than 2 years | Lieutenant | - | 5 years at least |

Eligible applicants are permitted to sit for entry exams which include exam in special discipline, exam in philosophy, exam in foreign language. Admission is conducted on the competitive basis, priority is given to applicants, ceteris paribus, achieving highest marks on special discipline. Officers passed the competitive selection are enrolled in adjunctura by the Minister of Defence of Russia order.

== Educational process ==
The classes start on 1 September of the calendar year of the admission. Each adjunct has an individual curriculum and scientific supervisor.

The program provides for studying and examinations in history and philosophy of science, in foreign language and in special discipline. Also each adjunct should prepare a thesis. The thesis defense is held on a dissertation council. Adjuncts get academic degree of candidate of sciences after successful defense.

== After finishing adjunctura ==
Officers who have successfully finished the adjunctura are appointed to positions by the Minister of Defence of Russia order.
