= Military academies in Russia =

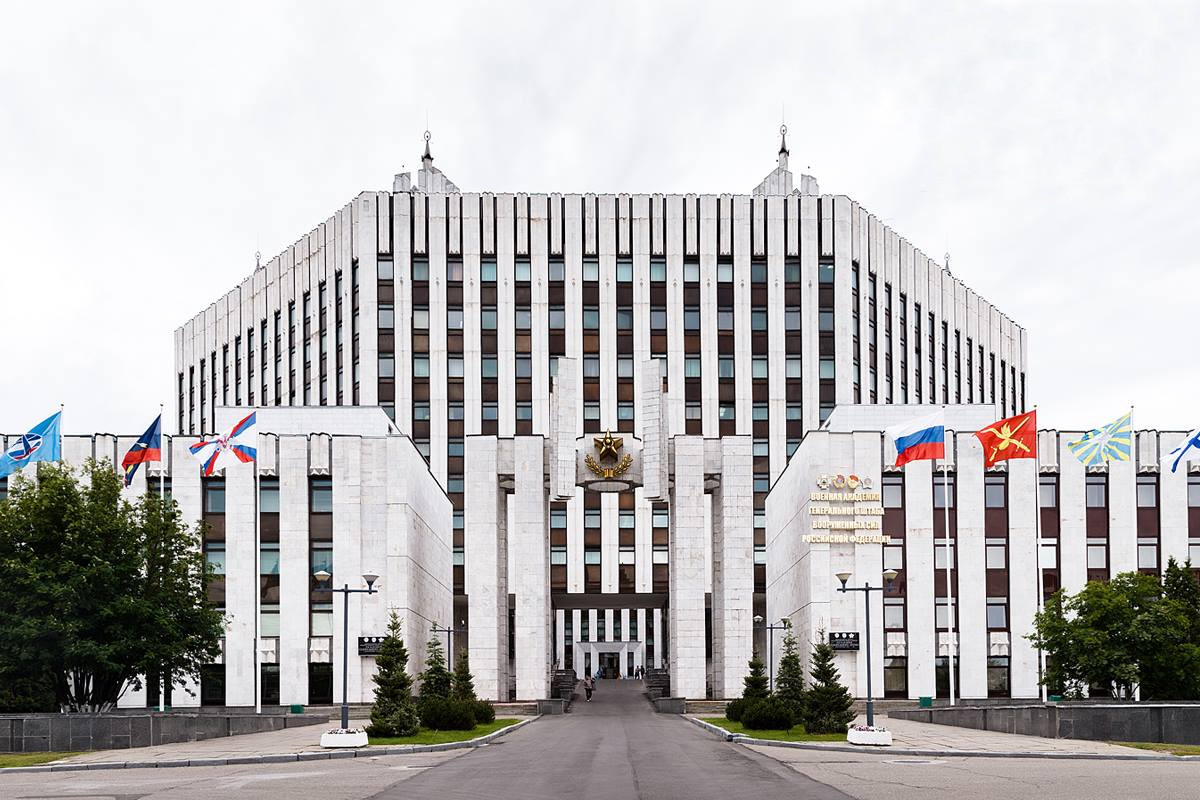
The building of the Military Academy of the General Staff of the Armed Forces of Russia

Russia has a number of military academies of different specialties. This article primarily lists institutions of the Armed Forces of the Russian Federation rather than those of the Soviet Armed Forces.

Russian institutions designated as an "academy" are post-graduate professional military schools for experienced commissioned officers who graduated from higher military school or military training center within civilian university and have some years of active duty service after graduation. Thus, military academies are educational institutions conducting the advance training career commissioned officer programmes. These programmes are named magistratura (Russian: магистратура) and take 2 years. Military academies are the second (operational-tactical) level of officer training. Their graduates can be appointed to battalion/regiment/brigade commander or equivalent positions.

At the moment, some military academies also conduct programmes for the training of warrant officers and commissioned officers .

A special case is Military Academy of the General Staff of the Armed Forces of Russia which is the third (strategic) level of officer training. This academy prepares highest-ranking military officers. The educational programme at Military Academy of the General Staff takes 2 years.

== Admission ==
=== Magistratura (operational-tactical level) ===
Officer wishing to join the program shall comply with the entry requirements illustrated below

Reached educational level	Years of active duty service as commissioned officer	Military rank (no lower than)	Military position (years of experience)	Expected number of years of active duty service after graduation until general upper age limit for tenure
Military school or Military training center (tactical level)	no less than 7 years	captain/captain lieutenant	Major/Captain 3rd rank's positions (1 year at least)	5 years at least

=== Military Academy of the General Staff of the Armed Forces (strategic level) ===
Officer wishing to join the program shall comply with the entry requirements illustrated below

Reached educational level	Years of active duty service as commissioned officer	Military rank (no lower than)	Military position (years of experience)	Expected number of years of active duty service after graduation until general upper age limit for tenure
Military academy (operational-tactical level)	-	Major/Captain 3rd rank	Colonel/Captain 1st rank's positions (1 year at least)	5 years at least

== Military Academy of the General Staff of the Armed Forces ==
In 1936, Leonid Govorov founded the current General Staff Academy in Moscow. It has been the senior Russian professional school for officers in their late 1930s. The "best and the brightest" senior commissioned officers of all forces are selected to attend this most prestigious of all Soviet military academies. Students are admitted to the Academy in the ranks of lieutenant colonel, colonel, and Major General (one star). Most are colonels or newly promoted generals. Previous names include: Marshal Voroshilov Military Academy of the WPRA General Staff; General Staff of the Armed Forces of the USSR; General Staff of the Armed Forces of the Russian Federation.

== Magistratura level military academies ==
=== General-purpose Military Academies ===
==== S. M. Kirov Military Medical Academy ====
The S. M. Kirov Military Medical Academy (Russian: Военно-медицинская академия им. С. М. Кирова) in Saint Petersburg was established in 1798. Senior medical staff are trained for the Armed Forces and conduct research in military medical services. The institution also provides advanced training for mid-career military medical doctors and trains graduate students to Ph.D. level.

==== Krasnodar Higher Military School named for Army General S.M. Shtemenko ====
The academy was founded in 1929. Since 1954, it is located in Krasnodar.

==== Military University of Radioelectronics ====
The academy was founded in 1957 in Cherepovets.

=== Military Academies of the Ground Forces ===
==== Budyonny Military Academy of the Signal Corps ====
The Budyonny Military Academy of the Signal Corps (Военная академия связи имени Маршала Советского Союза С.М. Будённого) was created in 1932 in Leningrad. It is named after Semyon Budyonny. It trains the Russian military's future signals and communications experts.

==== Combined Arms Academy of the Armed Forces of the Russian Federation ====
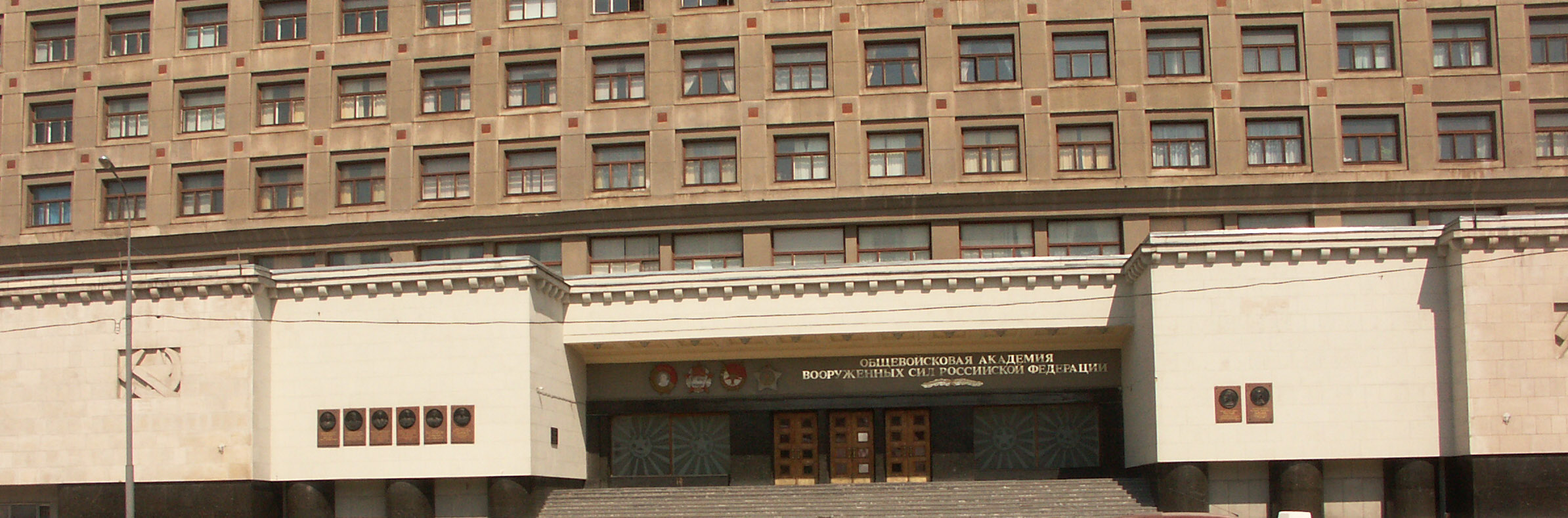
Combined Arms Academy entrance

In 1918 the Frunze Military Academy in Moscow was established as the academy of the General Staff, which became the RKKA Military Academy in 1921. It is named after Mikhail Frunze, the then USSR Minister of Defence in mid-1920s. It is roughly the equivalent of the U.S. Army's Command and General Staff College at Fort Leavenworth, Kansas or the British Army's Staff College, Camberley. Officers in their late twenties up to thirty-two years at the rank of Captain or Major enter if they pass the competitive entry examinations.

In the 1930s, higher academic courses were added to the Frunze curriculum as an advanced training program for previous graduates. Later on, this program became the basis for the "Voroshilov General Staff Academy" and the Frunze Academy refocused upon combined arms ground warfare training at the tactical level. In September 1998 the Frunze Academy and the "Malinovsky Academy" were amalgamated into the Combined Arms Academy of the Armed Forces of the Russian Federation, on the site of the former Frunze Academy, which since 2010 is known as Military Educational and Scientific Centre. The Military Educational and Scientific Centre has been the site of a number of Russian-Western joint military activities, including an IISS conference in February 2001, and U.S.-Russian exercises.

After graduation from Military Educational and Scientific Center, every graduate officer receives a diploma and a silver diamond-shaped badge which has to be worn on the right side of his uniform or civilian clothes above all other military or civilian decorations or ribbon bars.

==== Mikhailovskaya Military Artillery Academy ====
The Mikhailovskaya Artillery Military Academy (Russian: Михайловская военная артиллерийская академия) in Saint Petersburg dates back to 1698. In 1849 it was named Mikhailovskaya after Grand Duke Mikhail Pavlovich of Russia. In 1925 it merged into the Red Army Military Technical Academy, was restored in 1953 as Kalinin Artillery Military Academy (Военная артиллерийская академия им. М. И. Калинина) as a spin-off of the Dzerzhinsky Academy, and in 1995 went back to the Grand Duke's name.

==== Military Academy of Field Anti-Aircraft Defense ====
Military Academy of Field Anti-Aircraft Defense (Russian: Военная академия войсковой противовоздушной обороны имени Маршала Советского Союза А.М. Василевского) was founded in 1970 in Smolensk.

==== Military Logistics Academy ====
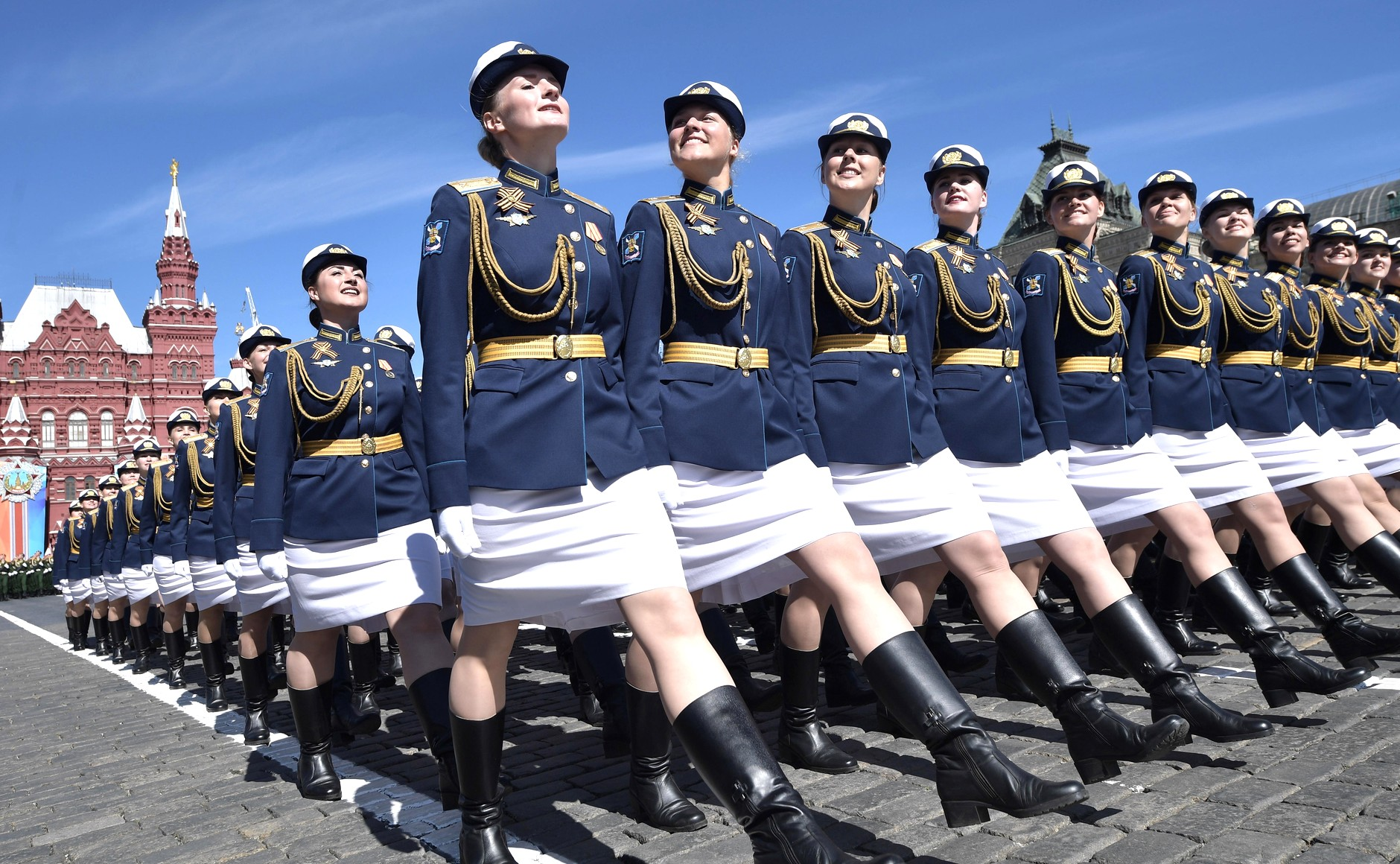
Female cadets of the Military Logistics Academy on parade in 2018.

The Military Logistics Academy (Russian: Военная академия материально-технического обеспечения имени генерала армии А.В. Хрулёва) was created in 1918 in Leningrad. It trains officers and NCO's for the various Armed Forces rear services and the Army Transportation Force, a part of the rear services. One of its graduates is Igor Levitin, a former Russian Minister of Transport.

==== NBC Protection Military Academy ====
Timoshenko NBC Protection Military Academy (Военная академия радиационной, химической и биологической защиты имени Маршала Советского Союза С.К. Тимошенко) was established in 1932 in Moscow. It is named after Semyon Timoshenko. Its duties are for the training of officers and NCOs in chemical warfare and defence. It is located in Kostroma in Kostroma Oblast and has now opened its doors to engineering cadets as well.

=== Military Academies of the Navy ===
==== Kuznetsov Naval Academy ====
Formerly known as Marshal Andrey Grechko Naval Academy, the Kuznetsov Naval Academy is located in St. Petersburg and is the Russian Navy's only senior service school. The students are lieutenants commander, commanders, and some captains, with ages from 30–35 years. All naval officers (including naval aviation) holding positions of Executive Officers, Commanding Officers, formation, fleet, or naval staff command positions are graduates of this academy. First established in 1827 as the Advance Officers' Class of the Imperial Russian Navy and later the Nikolayev Naval Academy and reorganized as the Petrograd Maritime Academy in 1917, and at various times renamed as the WPRF Naval Academy, the Marshal of the Soviet Union Kliment Voroshilov Naval Academy and the Marshal of the Soviet Union Andrey Grechko Naval Academy, it gained its current name and title in 1990.

=== Military Academies of the Aerospace Forces ===
==== A.F. Mozhaysky Military-Space Academy ====
This is the academy responsible for the training of officers of the Russian Aerospace Defence Forces, the armed forces' youngest branch of service. It was most recently renamed the Military Space Engineering Academy in November 2002.

==== Zhukov Air and Space Defence Academy ====
The academy, formed in 1956, is named after Soviet Marshal Georgy Zhukov.

==== Zhukovsky – Gagarin Air Force Academy ====
The Gagarin Military Air Academy is located at Monino, northeast of Moscow, in an area closed to foreigners, nearby the Central Air Force Museum. Almost all the senior officers in the Soviet Air Force have attended this academy. It is charged with the preparation of "command cadres of various aviation specialties and is a research center for working out problems of operational art of the Air Force and tactics of branches and types of aviation."

=== Military Academies of the Strategic Rocket Forces ===
==== Peter the Great Military Academy of the Strategic Missile Forces ====
The Academy descended from Mikhailovskaya Artillery Academy of Imperial Russia created in 1820 in St. Petersburg. The Dzerzhinsky Military Academy (Russian: Военная академия им. Ф. Э. Дзержинского) was created in 1932 as F.E. Dzerzhinsky Artillery Academy (Артиллерийская академия имени Ф. Э. Дзержинского) of the "Red Army from the "Artillery Department and the Powder and Explosives" section of the Military Technical Academy's chemistry department that was disbanded at the time.

Dzerzhinsky Academy was moved from Leningrad to Moscow in 1958, the year before the Strategic Rocket Forces were formed. Now named the Dzerzhinsky Missile Force Academy, its main facility was 'located at Kitayskiy Proyezd 9/5, within a block' of the Rossiya Hotel off Red Square. Other sources report that it was in the historical building of the Moscow Orphanage. Officers in command positions in the Strategic Missile Troops would seek admission to this academy. Information about this academy was highly classified. Its two major faculties were "command" and "engineering." The Academy was renamed after Peter the Great in 1997, and its Commandant is now Colonel General (three star) Yuriy F. Kirillov.

== Academies of other militarized agencies ==
=== Academies of the Federal Security Service ===
==== Federal Security Service Academy ====
Established on 25 December 1921 and relaunched on August 24, 1992, this training academy of the Russian Federal Security Service is mandated for the enhanced education of all FSS personnel in various fields of law enforcement. Since 2007, Colonel General Victor Ostroukhov is its commandant.

=== Academies of the Ministry of Emergency Situations ===
==== Civil Defense Academy of the Ministry of Emergency Situations ====
As part of the Ministry of Emergency Situations of Russia, this academy conducts magistratura training programmes for the service of the country's civil defence capabilities and disaster response services.

== See also ==
- Military-focused secondary schools in Russia
- Warrant officer schools of the Russian Armed Forces
- Military commissioning schools in Russia
- Reserve Officer Training in Russia
- Adjunctura in Russia
- Military education in the Soviet Union
- Academy of Foreign Intelligence
