= Russian military bands =

Musical ensembles maintained by the Russian Armed Forces

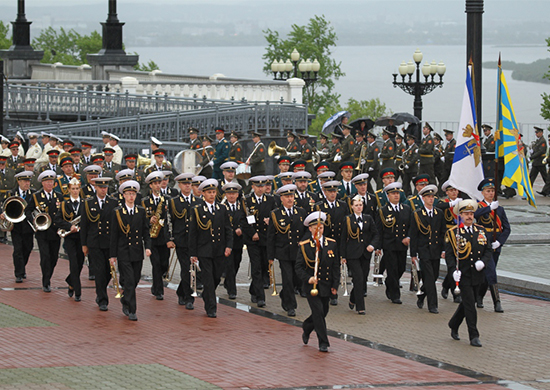
A Russian naval band

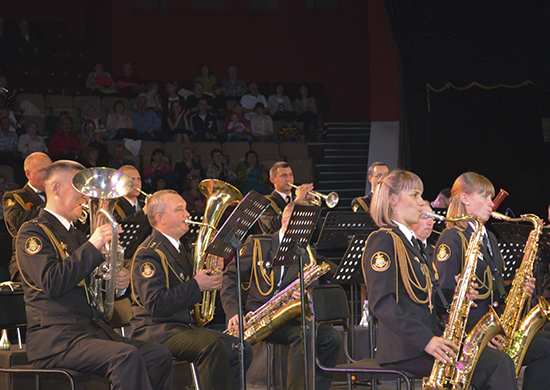
A Russian band during the Shanghai Cooperation Organization Military Tattoo in 2018

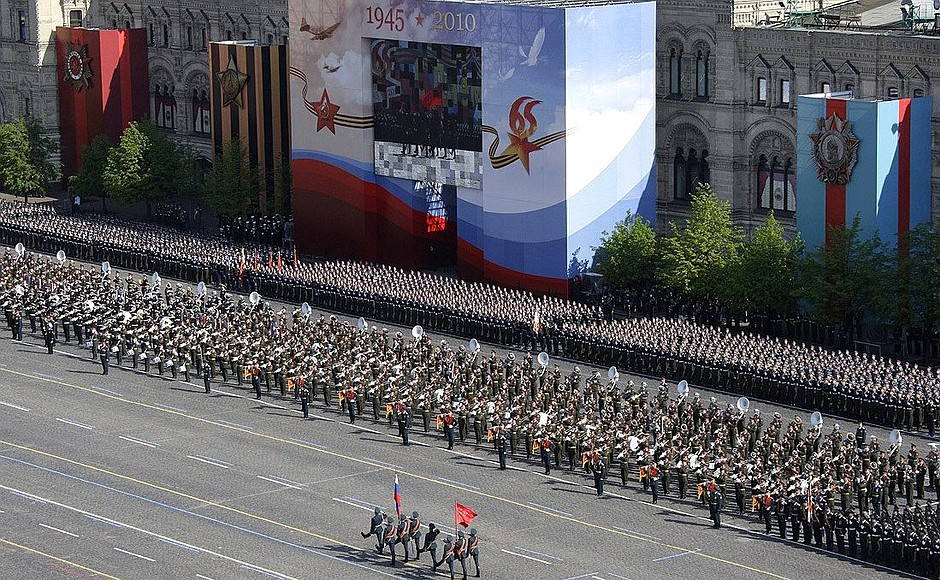
The massed bands of the Moscow Garrison in 2010

Russian military bands fall under the jurisdiction of the Military Band Service of the Armed Forces of Russia, which is the official music service for the Russian Armed Forces, and led by the Senior Director of Music, a billet of an officer with the rank of a Colonel or a general officer. There are between 200 and 300 military bands in the Russian Armed Forces that span across the military as well as all uniformed services in the country. All bands, active or reserve, are composed of graduates from the military music training centers stationed anywhere in the country, as well as of civilian conservatories. While choirs may be attached to military bands, individual staff choirs do not exist in the Russian Armed Forces, since they have attached instrumental ensembles or orchestras. As of 2009, all military musicians are paid around 13,000 rubles ($169.65) for their service in the Armed Forces and other uniformed organizations.

== Purpose ==
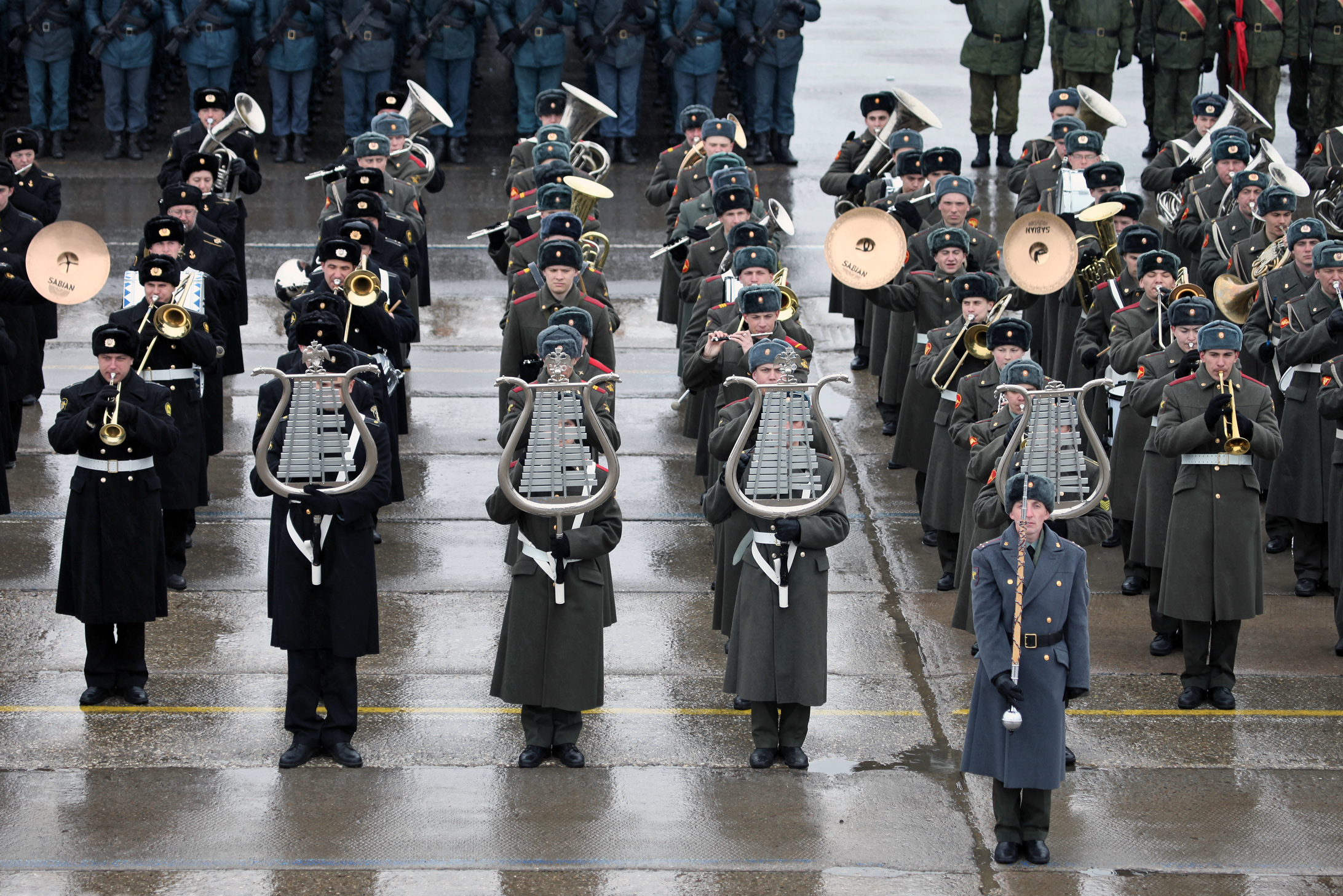
The massed bands at a parade rehearsal

The military band service is designed to provide encouragement and to increase patriotism for the military servicemen and women of the Ground Forces, the Navy and the Aerospace Forces. Former director of bands in the Russian Armed Forces Valery Khalilov described the effect these bands have in the following 2005 interview:

"Military music is incredibly important for Russians, because military music is a component of the Russian army, and the army has always played a crucially important role in protecting Russia’s great statehood and in making it a powerful nation."

== History ==
For a country that has not just one of the largest armed forces in the world but also has produced some of the greatest composers and musicians, the modern day military band tradition of Russia traces its origins to decree No. 2319 of Peter the Great enacted on February 19, 1711, which mandated the formation of military bands and field music formations within both the Imperial Russian Army and the nascent Imperial Russian Navy following the Western practices. As both the Army's two foundation regiments (the Preobrazhensky Regiment and the Semyonovsky Regiment) had their own bands and corps of drums, which would also inspire the formation of the bands and fanfare band units within the artillery and the cavalry, the age of Peter the Great, aside from laying the foundation of the armed forces, also began centuries of the Russian military band tradition, which continues until today. Russian bands have evolved in every period since then, and as parts of the armed forces military bands were utilized more in wartime and peacetime ceremonial duties during the Imperial era, bandsmen and field musicians (drummers, buglers, fanfare trumpeters and fifers) having fought in almost every military operation fought by the army and the navy. Under Catherine the Great, the number of military bands were increased. In 1804, military bands were introduced in the Baltic and Black Sea, as well as in Cossack forces in the Urals and in Orenburg.

"Peter the Great made the military bands official, he understood the importance of the rituals of military units."

— Valery Khalilov, Los Angeles Times

The Imperial Russian Army and the Imperial Russian Navy continued the practice, with composer Nikolai Rimsky-Korsakov, who was the civilian Inspector of Naval Bands from 1873 to 1884, being considered to be the pioneer of Russian naval music. By 1914, military bands had become a part of Russian daily life. The establishment of the Central Military Band of the People's Commissariat of Defense in 1927 marked the creation of the first modern professional military band in the country, after which military bands became part of Russian/Soviet culture. During the Great Patriotic War of 1941–1945, military bands flourished at the front. In 1941, the regiments of the Red Army had musical platoons, however, there were no regular bands. For example, in the 21st Division of the Narodnoe Opolcheniye, a 14-member jazz band appeared, who at the beginning of the war gave many concerts for soldiers and commanders. Close it the end of the war, Marshal of the Soviet Union Georgy Zhukov gave Order Number 071 to the directive of the Main Political Directorate of the Red Army, making regimental and divisional bands into regular units in the forces. These regular bands served during the liberation of Poland from the Wehrmacht (often performing with polka and mazurka for the local population) as well as during the Prague Offensive and the Vienna Offensive.

The reform of the bands began in 1948–1949 under the assistant director of the band service, Major General Ivan Petrov, and continued on until the 1970s. It was only in the late 1980s and early '90s was the presence of Soviet military bands available in military tattoos in the West, with the Band of the Moscow Military District and the Band of the Odessa Military District both participating in tattoos in the Netherlands in 1990.

== Repertoire ==
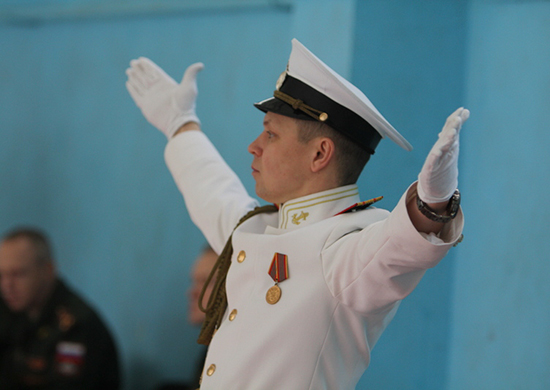
Captain Ilya Sergeev of the Military Band of the Pacific Fleet conducting

The Fanfare of President of the Russian Federation

Signal "Changing of the Guard"

The repertoire of the military band service spans across hundreds of pieces, which included ceremonial and marching music, as well as patriotic songs. Some of these musical pieces (particularly the formal ones) are used elsewhere in the militaries of the Commonwealth of Independent States. Many famous melodies such as Katyusha, Siny Platochek, and Podmoskovnye vechera have been converted into marches by military composers.

=== Ceremonial music ===
Title	Composer
Presidential Fanfare	Pavel Borisovich Ovsjannikov
Moscow Fanfare	Andrey Golovin
Ceremonial Fanfare	Nikolai Samokhvalov
Signal "Gathering!"	Vladimir Pavlov
Signal "Changing of the Guard"	Vladimir Pavlov
Petersburg Parade Fanfare	

=== Patriotic songs ===
Title	Composer
National anthem of Russia	Alexander Vasilyevich Alexandrov
Slavsya	Mikhail Glinka
The Sacred War	Alexander Vasilyevich Alexandrov
Farewell of Slavianka	Vasily Agapkin
Den Pobedy	David Tukhmanov
Song of the Soviet Army	Alexander Aleksandrov
Long Live our State	Boris Alexandrovich Alexandrov
Katyusha	Matvey Blanter
Siny Platochek	Jerzy Petersburski
Moscow Nights	Vasily Solovyov-Sedoi

=== Retired Soviet marches/songs ===
Title	Composer
Voroshilov's March	Mikhail Ippolitov-Ivanov
Song of October	
Warszawianka 1905	Józef Pławiński
The Red Flag	

=== Military marches in active use ===
==== Service marches ====
Title	Composer	Branch
Forward, infantry!	Igor Matvienko	Russian Ground Forces
Air March	Yuli Kant	Russian Aerospace Forces
14 Minutes Until Launch	Oscar Feltsman	Russian Space Forces
The Crew—One Family		Russian Navy
March of the Marines		Russian Naval Infantry
March of the Artillerymen	Tikhon Khrennikov	Strategic Missile Forces
Our 10th Parachute Battalion	Bulat Okudzhava	Russian Airborne Forces
Song of the Alarming Youth	Alexandera Pakhmutova	EMERCOM

==== Others ====
Title	Composer
March of the Preobrazhensky Regiment	unknown
Triumph of Winners	
To Serve Russia	
March of the 108th Saratov Regiment	
Hero's March	
March of the Defenders of Moscow	Boris Mokrousov
First of All, Planes	Vasily Solovyov-Sedoi
March of Nakhimovtsev	Vasily Solovyov-Sedoi
Slow March of the Guards of the Navy	Nikolai Pavlocich Ivanov-Radkevich
Jubilee Slow March "25 Years of the Red Army"	Semyon Tchernetsky
March of the Tankists	Semyon Tchernetsky
Salute to Moscow	Semyon Tchernetsky
The Red Army's Entry into Bucharest	Semyon Tchernetsky
Slow March of the Artillery	Semyon Tchernetsky
Slow March of the Tankists	Semyon Tchernetsky
Slow March of the Red Army	Semyon Tchernetsky
March "Parade"	Semyon Tchernetsky
Jaeger March	Semyon Tchernetsky
March of the 92nd Pechersk Infantry Regiment	Semyon Tchernetsky
March "Joy of Victory"	Semyon Tchernetsky
In Defence of the Motherland	Viktor Runov
Capital March	Viktor Runov
On Guard For Peace	Boris Diev
Combat March	Dmitry Pertsev
Cossacks in Berlin	Dmitry Pokrass and Daniil Pokrass
Moscow in May	Daniil Pokrass
Sports March	Valentin Volkov
Adagio	Valery Khalilov
Kant	Valery Khalilov
Afghan	Valery Khalilov
Elegy	Valery Khalilov
Cadet	Valery Khalilov
Youth	Valery Khalilov
Rynda	Valery Khalilov
Ulan	Valery Khalilov
March "The Ship's bell	Valery Khalilov
Lefortsky March	Valery Khalilov
March "Pobeda"	Albert Arutyunov

== List ==
=== Bands of military academies and educational institutions ===
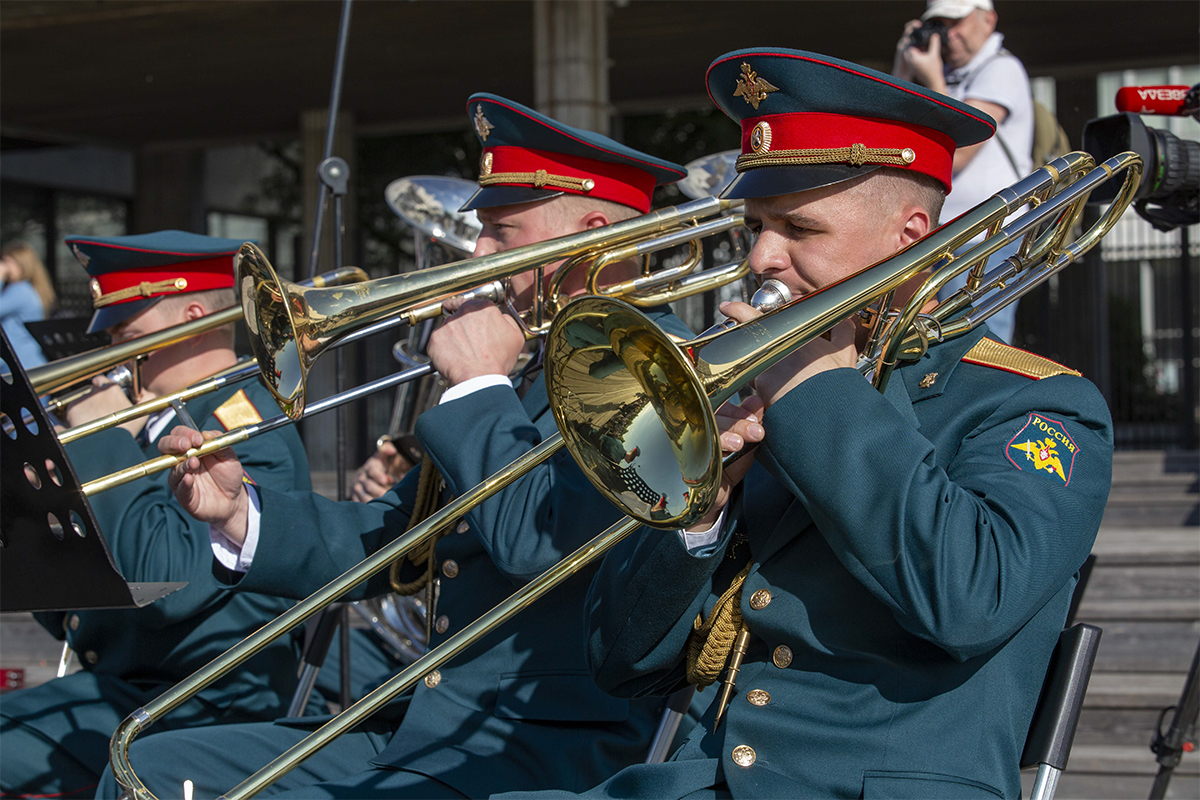
Band of the University of the Ministry of Defense

- Cadet Band of the Military Institute of Military Conductors
- Band of the Military University of the Ministry of Defense of the Russian Federation
- Training Band Wing of the Moscow Suvorov Military Music College Lieutenant-General VM Khalilov
- Youth Band of the Moscow Cadet Music Corps
- Band of the Combined Arms Academy of the Armed Forces of the Russian Federation
- Band of the Kuznetsov Naval Academy
- Band of the Peter the Great Military Academy of the Rocket Forces of Strategic Importance
- Band of the Moscow Border Institute of the FSB of the Russian Federation
- Band of the MES Civil Defense Academy
- Band of the Zhukovsky – Gagarin Air Force Academy Moscow Campus
- Band of the A.V. Khrulyov Military Logistics Academy
- Band of the Semyon Timoshenko Military University of Nuclear, Chemical and Biological Defense
- Band of the Budyonny Military Academy of the Signal Corps
- Band of the S.M. Kirov Military Medical Academy
- Band of the Moscow Higher Military Command School
- Band of the Far Eastern Higher Combined Arms Command School
- Band of the Ryazan Guards Higher Airborne Command School
- Band of the Krasnodar Higher Military Aviation School

=== Bands of military districts ===
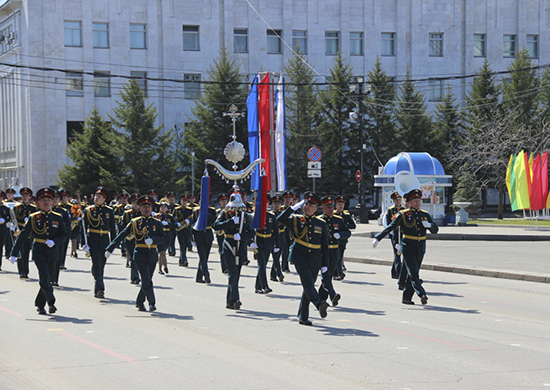
The Band of the Eastern Military District

- Military Band of the Western Military District in Saint Petersburg
- Military Band of the Southern Military District in Rostov-on-Don
- Military Band of the Central Military District in Ekaterinburg
- Military Band of the Eastern Military District in Khabarovsk
- Military Band of the Northern Fleet in Severomorsk

=== Bands of the Armed Forces ===
==== Russian Ground Forces ====
- Presidential Band of the Russian Federation - not directly under the RGF but under the direct control of the Kremlin Regiment, which reports to the Western Military District
- Special Exemplary Military Band of the Guard of Honor Battalion of Russia
- Band of the 154th Preobrazhensky Regiment
- Band of the 2nd Guards Tamanskaya Motor Rifle Division "Mikhail Kalinin"
- Band of the 4th Guards Kantemirovskaya Tank Division "Yuri Andropov"
- Band of the 25th Sevastopol Guards Motor Rifle Brigade
- Band of the 150th Rifle Division
- HQ Band of the 2nd Guards Army
- Band of the 27th Guards Motor Rifle Brigade
- Band of the 45th High-Powered Artillery Brigade
- Band of the 1st Semyonovsky Independent Rifle Regiment
- Band of the 623rd Interspecific Regional Training Center for the Communications Troops
- Band of the 39th Separate Motor Rifle Brigade

==== Russian Navy ====
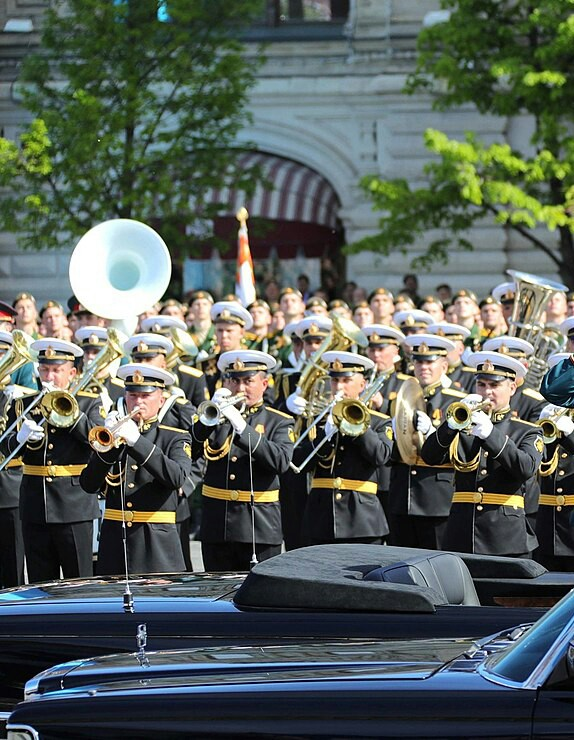
A navy band during a parade in Moscow

- Central Navy Band of Russia
- Admiralty Navy Band of Russia
- Brass Band of the Novorossiysk Naval Base
- Brass Band of the Belomorskaya Naval Base
- Military Band of the Black Sea Fleet
- Military Band of the Baltic Fleet
- Military Band of the Pacific Fleet
- Military Band of the Caspian Flotilla
- Military Band of the Northeastern Group of Troops and Forces (Kamchatka Flotilla)
- Band of the 336th Guards Naval Infantry Brigade
- Band of the 810th Guards Naval Infantry Brigade
- Band of the 77th Naval Infantry Regiment
- Military Band of the 861th Pacific Fleet Command Support Center

==== Russian Aerospace Forces ====
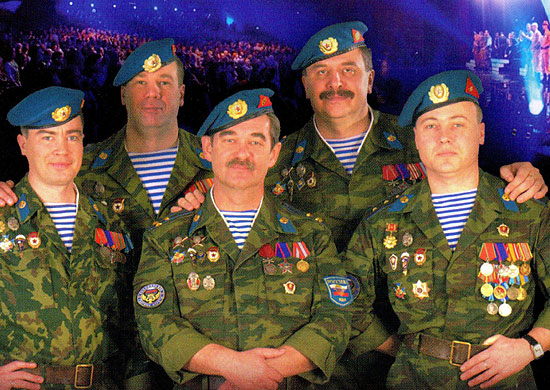
The Blue Berets

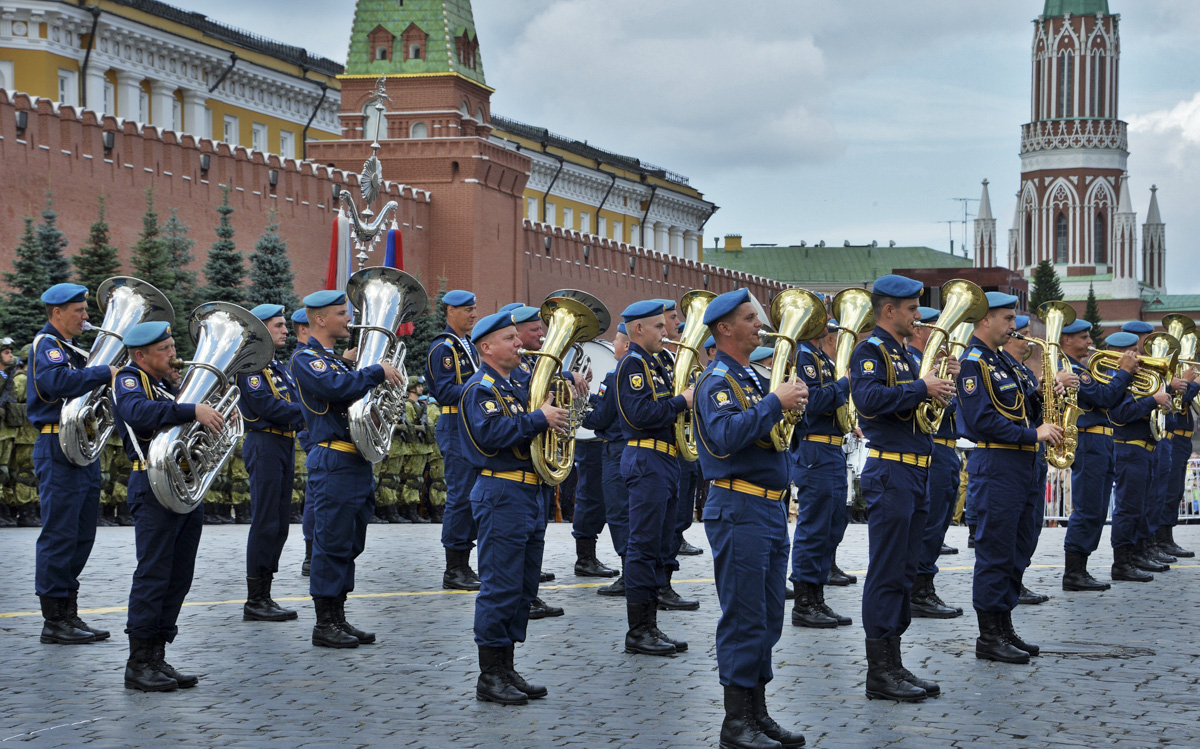
The Band of the Airborne Forces on Paratroopers' Day

- Concert Band of the Band of the 1st Aerospace and Missile Defence Forces Army
- Concert Band of the Band of the 6th Air and Air Defence Forces Army
- Concert Band of the Band of the 11th Air and Air Defence Forces Army
- Concert Band of the 14th Air and Air Defence Forces Army
- Concert Band of the 15th Aerospace Forces Army
- Central Band of the Russian Space Forces
- Brass Band of the Baikonur Cosmodrome of the Space Forces
- Band of the Main Testing Space Center

==== Other branches ====
- Strategic Missile Forces
  - HQ Band of the 33rd Guards Rocket Army
  - Band of the 62nd Rocket Division
- Russian Airborne Forces
  - Combined Band of the Russian Airborne Forces
  - HQ Band of the 98th Guards Airborne Division
  - HQ Band of the 106th Tula Guards Airborne Division
  - Band of the 31st Guards Air Assault Brigade
  - Blue Berets Band (not directly controlled by the military band service)
  - HQ Band of the 7th Guards Air Assault (Mountain) Division
  - Training Band of the 242nd Training Centre
  - Band of the Guards Airborne Assault Caucasian Cossack Regiment

==== Overseas military bands ====
- Band of the Russian 201st Military Base
- Band of the Russian 102nd Military Base
- Band of the 4th Guards Military Base
- Band of the 7th Military Base
- Band of the Operational Group of Russian Forces in Moldova
- Band of the Group of Russian Troops in Syria at Khmeimim Air Base

=== Bands of Russian Ministries and affiliate agencies ===
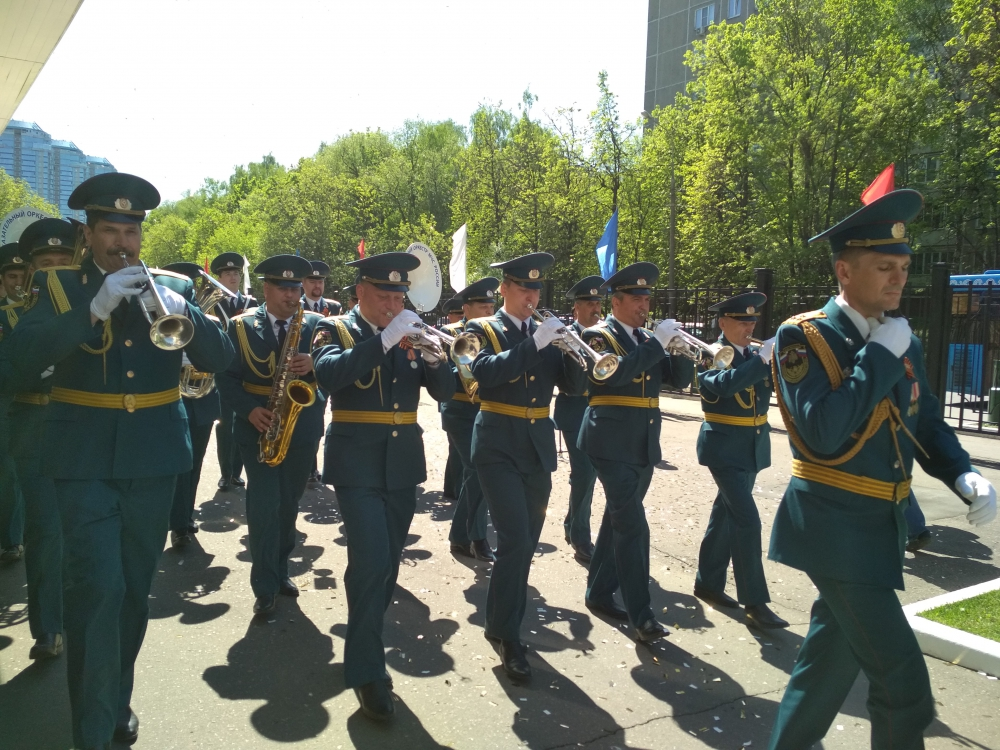
The EMERCOM Band

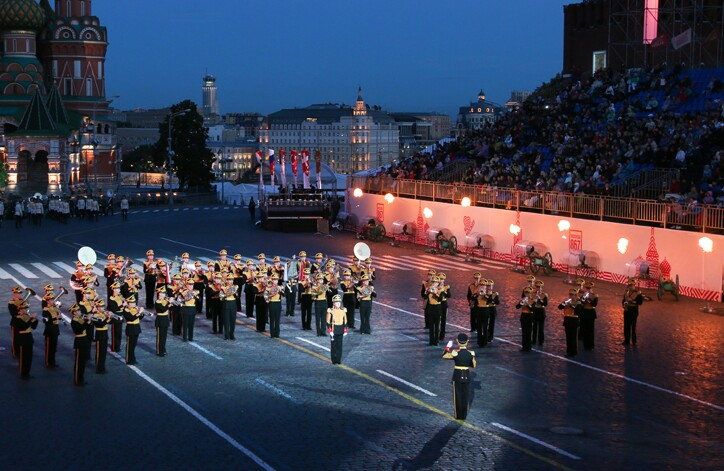
The Red Army Band

- Central Military Band of the Ministry of Defense of Russia (also known as the Red Army Band in the West)
- Band of the 147th Automobile Base of the Ministry of Defense
- Girls Corps of Drums, Boarding School for Girls, Ministry of Defense of Russia

Not under the Armed Forces but under other agencies:

- Military Band Service of the Ministry of Emergency Situations of Russia
- Military Band Service of the National Guard of Russia
- Police Band Service of the Ministry of Internal Affairs of Russia
- Central Band of the Border Guard Service of the Federal Security Service of Russia

=== Former bands ===
Under the Soviet Armed Forces and disbanded bands under the current Russian Armed Forces:

- Military Band Service of the Southern Group of Forces
- Military Band Service of the Group of Soviet Forces in Germany
- Military Band Service of the Central Group of Forces
- Military Band Service of the Northern Group of Forces
- Band of the Russian Transcaucasus Group of Forces
- HQ Band of the Far Eastern Military District
- 11th HQ Band of the Turkestan Military District
- 14th HQ Band of the Kyiv Military District
- 9th HQ Band of the Odessa Military District
- HQ Band of the Central Asian Military District
- Band of the Pushkin Air Defense Radioelectronical High School of the Soviet Air Defence Forces
- Band of the Donbass Pilot Training School
- Band of the Sevastopol College of Naval Engineering
- Band of the St. Peterburg Submarine Navigation High School

Under the Imperial Russian Army and the Imperial Russian Navy:

- Band of the Mozhansky Infantry Regiment
- HQ Band of the Imperial Life Guards and Petersburg Military District
- Band of the Preobrazhensky Life-Guard Regiment
- Band of the Semyonovsky Life Guard Regiment
- Band of the Pavlovsky Life-Guard Regiment
- Fanfare Band of His Imperial Majesty's Lifeguards Cossack Regiment
- Fanfare Section and Brass Band of His Imperial Majesty's Life Guard Horse Artillery Brigade
- Mounted Brass Band of the Life Guard Horse Regiment
- Band of the Alexander Military Institute
- Band of the Naval Cadet Corps Saint Petersburg

== Musical training ==
Musicians from the bands of the Moscow area garrison either receive their training from the Moscow Military Music College or the Moscow Conservatory.

After the 1917 October Revolution, the educational institutions of military bandmasters at conservatories in Petrograd and Moscow, as well as at the Warsaw Music Institute, were closed. In connection with the changing socio-political conditions and new ideological guidelines, a new system of musical education in the military was created.

One of the first steps of the new Soviet government was the 1921 opening of classes at the Tashkent and Petrograd Military Music Schools. A year later, the Tashkent Military Music School was transferred to Petrograd and merged into the Petrograd Military Music School before being disbanded a year later. The remaining 30 students were transferred to the 8th Petrograd Infantry School. Due to the transfer of the school to Kyiv, music conservatories became involved in the development of military music. In 1932, a bandmaster class was organized at the Frunze Military Academy with a three-year term of study was established. By the mid-thirties, with the increase in the number of the Red Army, a large number of new military educational institutions, including military faculties at civilian educational institutions, had been created for the training and preparation of senior musical personnel. Among these faculties, the Military Department of the Moscow Conservatory on the basis of order No. 183 on 28 November 1935 was created. More institutions would be established in the 40s and 50s and advanced through the 60s and 70s.

In October 1964, the first group of foreign students from the Mongolian People's Republic became enrolled in military musical institutions. In subsequent years, the number of students that came was expanded, with some coming from Bulgaria, the German Democratic Republic, Afghanistan, Burkina Faso, Yemen, Ethiopia and Vietnam. Since 1994, a special department had been operating at the Military Conducting Department, students of which come from countries of the Commonwealth of Independent States, with many graduates organizing military bands in their newly created home countries.

== Characteristics ==
=== Garrison conductors ===
The military conductor of the massed city garrison bands is responsible for providing general garrison events with military bands of military units and for the preparation, training, administration and formation of massed garrison bands in their area of responsibility.

In addition, they are, according to Article 36 of a decree by the President of Russia, responsible for coordinating the musical accompaniment of military units without military bands and assist the commanders of these military units in the training of drummers and extra musicians. They also lead instruction classes with military conductors and senior military band personnel. When on parade, they are usually referred to as the Chief Military Director (Главный военный дирижер) or Director of music as known in some Western countries. The Moscow area garrison massed bands are the country's seniormost massed bands formation, and its conductor holds the billet of Senior Director of Music of the Military Band Service.

The position of garrison conductor of massed military bands is present in many other Russian major cities.

=== Drum majors ===
In the Russian military, drum majors (Russian: Тамбурмажор) are commissioned officers who also serve as deputy band leaders and conductors. Although they are not required to be drummers, they but must have long experience as a military bandsman. The title was introduced in 1815 by the Imperial Russian Army. The Imperial uniform consisted of gold/silver galloons and a pair of epaulettes. The title was abolished in 1865 only for army regiments only to be reintroduced in the Red Army in 1918. The position was toned down following the Second World War, however the appointment of drum major was revived in the early-60s as style that could be differentiated with the Western version. All Russian drum majors are trained in military music schools and institutes like the Moscow Military Music College and the Institute of Military Band Conductors of the Military University of the Ministry of Defense. During parades, they carry maces with either their service or full dress uniform. The ceremonial maces they carry are held by their right hand and are thrusted up and down consistently to keep the band in step and on beat.

=== Fanfare trumpets ===
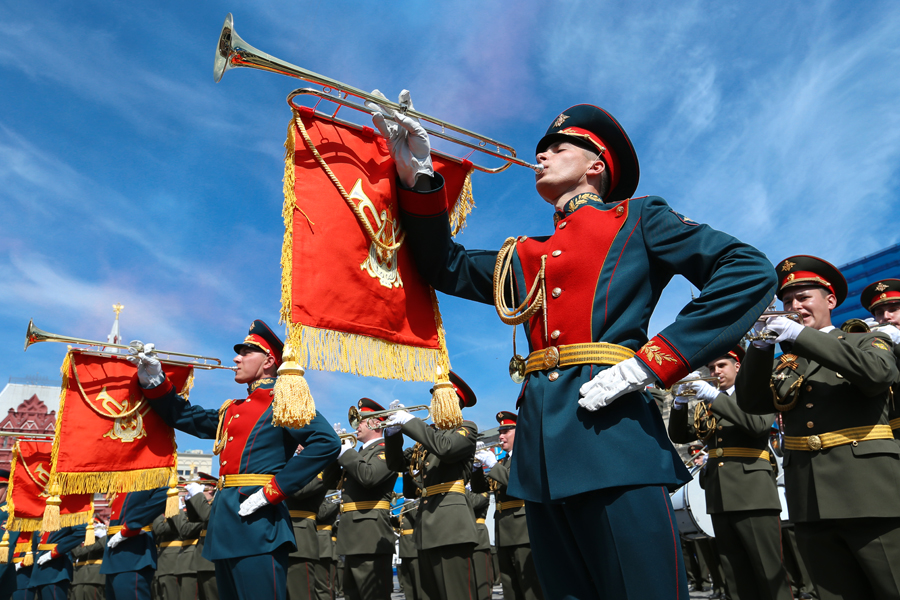
A fanfare trumpeter of the military band of the 3rd Battalion, 154th Preobrazhensky Independent Commandant's Regiment in May 2015. The regimental band's fanfare trumpeters are positioned in front of the massed bands in every major parade held in Moscow's Red Square.

Fanfare trumpets in the military band service are an important part of state events and military band culture. Usually located at the front of a single band formation or in massed bands formation, the area of expertise of fanfare trumpeters in the armed forces includes playing specially composed fanfares such as the Moscow Fanfare or the Fanfare of the President of the Russian Federation. They were first seen in modern military parades in the 1920s, equipped with an elongated bell allowing for a flag or tabard to be hung. Most soldiers who were in the position of fanfare trumpeter were dressed in slightly different uniforms than the rest of the band, usually a different color of the full dress uniform. The natural chromatic fanfare trumpet model is used in many military bands in Russia, with similar ones also being used in military styled marching bands in Germany, France and the United Kingdom. During the Imperial period and up to the early decades of the Soviet Armed Forces these fanfare trumpets were kept as an important regalia for the unit, having the same status as a regimental colour, the first such instruments were granted as battle honours in 1737 and Guards Fanfare Trumpets with the Ribbon of St. George debuted for the Imperial Guard in 1805. When a unit band was disbanded, the fanfare trumpets were transferred to the Museum of the Red Army (now the Central Armed Forces Museum). In 1944, an order to revive the practice, this time for distinguished service in the Red Army, failed to pass in the Presidum of the Supreme Soviet, but nevertheless the fanfare trumpets were given to outstanding bands of units for service to the homeland in times of war. In the ground forces and air force bands the fanfare trumpets, then as is now, have scarlet tabbards with the symbol of the Band Service on them in gold at the center and is surrounded with gold fringe, the symbol is that of two crossed natural chromatic fanfare trumpets with a lyre, symbol of military music, at the center. In the naval bands, the tabard, gold fringed, is in the form of a small version of the state naval ensign.

=== Field snare drummers of massed bands ===
The late decades of Soviet rule also saw the reintroduction of another aspect of military bands in Russia: the field snare drummers, which are a modern form of the days wherein snare drummers lead out their bands or their respective units on parade (the latter when with buglers, fifers and/or fanfare trumpeters) or when in massed bands formation. They first appeared during the October Revolution Day parade of 1981, and the Special Exemplary Military Band of the Guard of Honor Battalion of Russia pioneered the use of the drums when they first adopted them for state arrival and wreath laying ceremonies in 1978–1979. These drummers typically carry large or small sized side marching snare drums fitted with rubber or cotton slings, during the 1980s the drums were painted red and white with the red star cap badge of the Soviet Armed Forces in the center and gold borders. Today, of all select cities that have had massed bands formation for major parades during the 1980s, only five now maintain the practice for major national holidays (Moscow, Krasnodar, Sevastopol (introduced 2018), Yekaterinburg (reinstated 2020) and Khabarovsk (introduced 2017)), formerly it was standard use in the massed bands in St. Petersburg, Kazan and Rostov-on-Don, among other cities. In Moscow, the field snare drummers of the massed bands today wear the same uniforms as the fanfare trumpeters to honor their Imperial predecessors.

=== Corps of drums ===
Most military academies and cadet schools, as well as a number of HQ and support units of military formations and commands, maintain a corps of drums (known locally as rota barabanshchiki) that are specifically brought out during military parades. These formations too are of Imperial origin. Corps of drums are always made a separate part of military bands and are usually led by a drum major in the place of the director of music of a certain band and are the first formation to march past the saluting grandstand in parades, with its drummers first sounding a drumbeat cadence that keeps the parade on the beat before they march past. If possible, the corps of drums of the local Suvorov or Nakhimov Naval School would be used during events of national importance. The most famous of these special units in the international sphere would be the Corps of Drums of the Valery Khalilov Moscow Military Music College, first unveiled during the Moscow Victory Parade of 1945 and has since been regular participant in the October Revolution Day (1938 to 1990), May Day (1938 to 1968) and Victory Day (1965, 1985, 1990, 1995–2008, 2012-) parades on Red Square. A Turkish crescent for the college was used as its unit symbol during the Soviet era until it was replaced in 1995 by a colour guard squad. Most of these corps have an instrumentation that includes snare drums, fifes, trumpets, glockenspiels and on occasion, chromatic fanfare trumpets and trombones, and its musicians wear the service or full dress uniform of their respective unit or educational institution. Until 1969 the corps of drums, following its march past in front of the parade grandstand, would be positioned near the massed bands to provide additional support in parades. It has been resumed only in Moscow beginning in 2010, but only on Victory Day during the mobile column segment.

=== Uniform ===
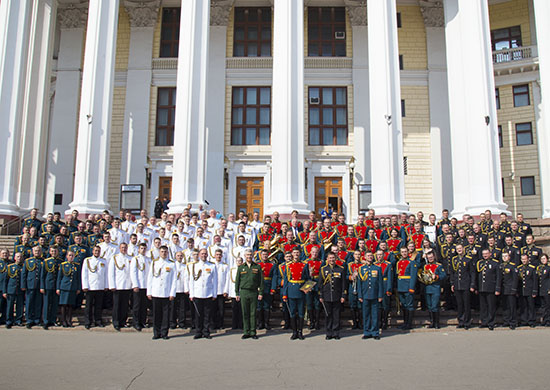
The bands of the Western Military District in their various uniforms

The uniforms of Russian military bands vary depending on the unit. Most unit bands utilize the standard dress uniform with the closed collar of the Russian Army (updated in 2017), although the everyday service uniform can also be worn. The Exemplary Band of the Honor Guard has from 1958 to 1971 and since 2013 worn the full dress uniform of the 3rd Honor Guard Battalion, 154th Preobrazhensky Independent Commandant's Regiment (known in the Soviet era as the M-1955), which consists of a closed collar uniform with a red plastron with golden piping. From 1971 to 2013, the band wore the standard dress uniform of the armed forces. The Central band of the defence ministry wears uniforms similar to the Imperial-style uniforms of the Kremlin Regiment. The Presidential Band performs in all white dress uniforms with blue epaulettes on the sides. The Central Navy Band and all Navy bands wear standard naval uniforms, including those of the Naval Infantry, which wear their signature black berets.

=== Size and composition ===
There are 4 variant sizes of military bands. The size depends on the status of the unit/institution of which it is attached. For example, a band of a regiment/brigade formation may only have 18 people (they are usually referred to as полковом оркестре, meaning regimental bands), whereas a band of a military academies may have 26 people. Bands of district of headquarters and fleets have 44 people, recruiting personnel from all over their area of responsibility. The largest ones are the bands of service branches and specialized units called Exemplary Bands, numbering around 63 people each. Most military bands are filled with a variety of different types of soldier, whether it be conscripts, cadets or recently civilian musician graduates of civilian conservatories who serve in the bands.

=== Formation of city massed bands for military parades ===
The Red Square military parade films from the 1920s and 1930s and photographs from these decades would often feature the massed military bands of the Moscow Military District formed up in a form that had been used many times during the Imperial era during major military parades: the percussion, glockenspiels and Turkish crescents being at the front ranks behind the senior director, lead bandmasters and the drum major/s together with the chromatic fanfare trumpeters and the trombonists, with the trumpeters and clarinet players behind in front of the conductors and bandmasters followed by the remainder of the bandsmen, with the tubas, euphoniums, wagner tubas and helicons in the rear ranks. This was an adapted form of the German parade formation of individual military bands to suit the Russian tradition since the late 19th century of having massed bands. This had been the arrangement seen during the 1945 Victory Parade in a modified form that had begun in the 1930s under Major General Tchernetsky, the founding Senior Director of Music of the Armed Forces. Similar formations were present in a number of cities in the Soviet Union and is the basis of the modern day massed bands formation in Kyiv under the Military Music Department of the General Staff of the Ukrainian Armed Forces. The modern arrangement of massed bands in many parts of Russia today began in the 1951 May Day Parade under the senior director of music, Major General Ivan Petrov, which has been modified many times with the current arrangement having been used within Moscow since 2021, which is a mix of the old and new traditions. In Moscow and several other cities (like Khabarovsk, Rostov-on-Don and Yekaterinburg), the form is that the chromatic fanfare trumpeters and field drummers, as well as glockenspiel players, are at the front ranks of the massed bands (composed of around 1,600 musicians from within the Moscow area), followed by the trumpeters, trombonists, the percussion battery, French horns, woodwinds and the bass section (tubas, euphoniums, tenor horns, sousaphones and wagner tubas). Similar formations are present in other major cities with massed bands formations available even without the drummers and fanfare trumpeters, having an estimated 200 to 450 in minor cities up to more than 800 in cities like St. Petersburg and Rostov-on-Don. In the 2019 Victory Day parade in Ufa, Bashkortostan, a modified form of the Imperial and early Soviet massed bands formation was used.

=== Performances ===
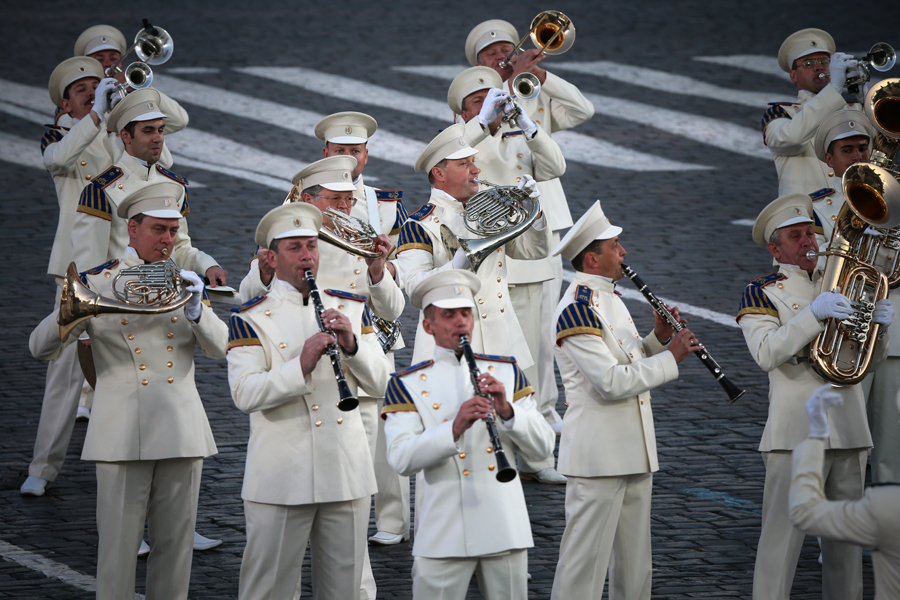
Presidential Band of the Russian Federation at Spasskaya Tower

- The combined bands of the Moscow Garrison (usually composed of over 1,100 musicians) are required to take part in the annual Moscow Victory Day Parade on Red Square under the leadership of the Senior Director of Music of the Military Band Service of the Armed Forces of Russia.
- The Central Military Band of the Ministry of Defense of Russia is also required to take part in the Russian Honor Parade on Red Square on November 7.
- The Special Exemplary Military Band of the Guard of Honor Battalion of Russia performs with the 154th Preobrazhensky Independent Commandant's Regiment during the welcoming of foreign delegations to Russia.
- Being the host of the festival, the senior director of music of the military band service requires Russian military bands to take part in the Spasskaya Tower military tattoo. He serves as the lead co-organizing chairman of the festival and its executive producer.

== Notable current and former musicians in the Russian/Soviet Armed Forces ==
- Lieutenant General Valery Khalilov – Considered to be the last great conductor to be educated in the Soviet era, he was notable for his policy of promoting Russian military bands on the world stage and his reorganization of the military band service and the massed bands of the Moscow Garrison.
- Captain Alexei Karabanov – Current conductor of the Central Navy Band of Russia and longtime director of the Admiralty Navy Band of Russia from 1985 to 2008.
- Vasily Agapkin - composer and author of Farewell of Slavianka (written 1912)
- Colonel Armen Poghosyan – Director of the Band of the General Staff of the Armed Forces of Armenia from 1992-2022
- Major General Volodymyr Derkach – Senior Military Director of the Military Music Department of the General Staff of the Ukrainian Armed Forces from 1995 to 2014
- Major General Yusif Akhundzade – Director of the Central Band of the Ministry of Defense of Azerbaijan from 1992-2024.
- Ilya Shatrov - Former bandmaster of the Mokshansky Regimental Orchestra
- Dmitry Pertsev - Director of the Military Band of the Leningrad Military District in the 1970s
- Michael Yaaran - Director of the Israel Defense Forces Orchestra from 2003 to 2013.

== Performance gallery ==
The massed bands performing the National anthem of Russia at a Victory Day Parade in 2010

The presidential band performing the national anthem at the Inauguration of Dmitry Medvedev in 2008

== See also ==
- Military Band Service of the Armed Forces of Russia
- Corps of drums
- Fanfare band
- Canadian military bands
- United States military bands
- List of marching bands
- March (music)

== Video sources ==
- "Central Military Band of Russia Documentary Фильм о Военном Оркестре России". Youtube (in Russian).
- Военно-оркестровая служба Вооруженных Сил Российской Федерации. Mil.ru (in Russian).
- "March of Life Guards Preobrazhensky regiment". Youtube.
- Военный оркестр вч 80847 ГСВГ. Youtube (in Russian).
- قيادة الفرق الموسيقية العسكرية بعصى القيادة. Youtube (in Arabic).
- "Massed Bands of the Soviet Army plays march "The Stars and Stripes Forever" by Sousa". Youtube.
- "Сводный оркестр Санкт-Петербургского гарнизона исполняет военные марши". Youtube.
- "Музыкальное оформление воинских ритуалов. МО СССР 1982 год". Youtube.
