= 1990 Moscow Victory Day Parade =

Russian military parade

The 1990 Moscow Victory Day Parade was held on May 9, 1990 to commemorate the 45th anniversary of the Victory of the Soviet Union in the Great Patriotic War. The parade was inspected by the USSR Minister of Defense Marshal Dmitry Yazov, and was commanded by the Commander of the Moscow Military District Colonel general Nikolai Vasilyevich Kalinin.

== Overview ==
12.5 thousand people and 429 units of equipment took part in the parade. It was the last parade in the USSR on Red Square, dedicated to the victory in the Great Patriotic War. This is the first Victory Day parade which did not depict Vladimir Lenin's portrait on the Red Square and this practice continues to the present. This parade also featured a float featuring the Soldier-liberator Statue, the first-of-its-kind for a Soviet Victory Day Parade. On the eve of the parade, Gorbachev laid a wreath at the Tomb of the Unknown Soldier. A small parade featuring the Waltham American Legion Band was also held on Red Square following the massive parade, becoming the first American Band to ever play in Moscow.

== Full order of the marchpast ==
=== Military bands ===
- Massed Military Bands of the Moscow Military District

=== Ground column ===
- Corps of Drums of the Moscow Military Music College
- Victory Banner Color Guard
- Front Standards
- Colour guard battalion of regimental, brigade and division colors of the Soviet Army
- Veterans regiment
  - Heroes of the Soviet Union
  - Recipients of the Order of Glory
  - Veteran participants of the Moscow Victory Parade of 1945
  - Partisans
  - Civil awardees of the Order of Labour Glory
- Historical regiment
- M. V. Frunze Military Academy
- V. I. Lenin Military Political Academy
- Military Artillery Academy "Felix Dzerzhinsky"
- Military Armored Forces Academy Marshal Rodion Malinovsky
- Military Engineering Academy
- Military Academy of Chemical Defense and Control
- Yuri Gagarin Air Force Academy
- Professor Nikolai Zhukovsky Air Force Engineering Academy
- M. V. Frunze Naval College
- Airborne Division
- Moscow Border Guards Institute of the Border Defence Forces of the KGB "Moscow City Council"
- OMSDON Ind. Motorized Division of the Internal Troops of the Ministry of Internal Affairs of the USSR "Felix Dzerzhinsky"
- Suvorov Military School
- Nakhimov Naval School
- Moscow Military High Command Training School "Supreme Soviet of the Russian SFSR"

During the transition period from the ground to mobile columns, 30 cadets from the Suvorov and Nakhimov schools marched to the grandstand to bring flowers to the Soviet leadership who attended.

=== Mobile Column ===
- Historical column
  - T-34
  - ZIL-157
  - ZIL-131
  - Katyusha rocket launchers
  - BRDM-2
- Modern column
  - BTR-80
  - BMP-2
  - BMP-3
  - BMD-2
  - T-72
  - T-80
  - 2S9 Nona
  - 2S1 Gvozdika
  - 2S3 Akatsiya
  - BM-21 Grad
  - BM-27 Uragan
  - 2A36 Giatsint-B
  - 9K35 Strela-10
  - 9K33 Osa
  - S-300 missile system
  - 9K52 Luna-M
  - OTR-21 Tochka
  - R-17 Elbrus

=== Music ===
The military band of the Armed Forces of the Soviet Union was commanded by Major General Nikolay Mikhailov.

Inspection and address

- Jubilee Slow March "25 Years of the Red Army" (Юбилейный встречный марш "25 лет РККА) by Semyon Tchernetsky
- Slow March of the Tankmen (Встречный Марш Танкистов) by Semeon Tchenertsky
- Slow March of the Guards of the Navy (Гвардейский Встречный Марш Военно-Морского Флота) by Nikolai Pavlocich Ivanov-Radkevich
- March of the Life Guards Sapper Rifle Battalion
- March of the Preobrazhensky Regiment (Марш Преображенского Полка)
- Slow March of the Officers Schools (Встречный Марш офицерских училищ) by Semyon Tchernetsky
- Slow March (Встречный Марш) by Dmitry Pertsev
- Slow March of the Red Army (Встречный Марш Красной Армии) by Semyon Tchernetsky
- Slow March Victory (Встречный Марш «Победа») by Yuriy Griboyedov
- Slow March (Встречный Марш) by Severian Ganichev
- Slow March of the Guards of the Navy (Гвардейский Встречный Марш Военно-Морского Флота) by Nikolai Pavlocich Ivanov-Radkevich
- Slow March (Встречный Марш) by Viktor Sergeyebich Runov
- Glory (Славься) by Mikhail Glinka
- Moscow Parade Fanfare (Московская Парадная Фанфара) by Unknown
- State Anthem of the Soviet Union (Государственный гимн Советского Союза) by Alexander Alexandrov
- Fanfare (Фанфара)

Infantry Column

- Long Live Our State (Да здравствует наша держава) by Boris Alexandrov
- "The Sacred War" (Священная война) by Alexander Alexandrov
- Farewell of Slavianka (Прощание Славянки) by Vasiliy Agapkin
- We Need One Victory (Нам Нужна Одна Победа) by Bulat Shalvovich Okudzhava
- Victory Day (День Победы) by David Fyodorovich Tukhmanov
- March Victory (Марш Победа) by Albert Mikhailovich Arutyunov
- In Defense of the Homeland (В защиту Родины) by Viktor Sergeyevich Runov
- On Guard for the Peace (На страже Мира) by Boris Alexandrovich Diev
- Combat March (Строевой Марш) by Dmitry Illarionovich Pertsev
- Leningrad (Ленинград) by Viktor Sergeyeich Runov
- We are the Army of the People (Мы Армия Народа) by Georgy Viktorovich Mavsesyan
- Sports March (Спортивный Марш) by Valentin Volkov
- Victory Day (День Победы) by David Fyodorovich Tukhmanov
- Long Live our State (Да здравствует наша держава) by Boris Alexandrov

Mobile Column and Conclusion

- My Dear Capital/My Moscow (Дорогая Моя Столица/Моя Москва) by Isaac Dunayevsky
- We Need One Victory (Нам Нужна Одна Победа) by Bulat Shalvovich Okudzhava
- Salute to Moscow (Салют Москвы) by Semyon Tchernetsky
- March of the Tankmen (Марш Танкистов) by Semyon Tchernetsky
- Song of the Soviet Army (Песня о Советской Армии) by Alexander Alexandrov

== Other parades held in other cities ==
For many republics, this was the last parade held before the independence day of their republic. Among these was the Latvian SSR, whose parade of the Baltic Military District took place on the bank of the Daugava in Riga, being received by Colonel General Fyodor Kuzmin, the commander of the district's troops. Parades were also held in cities such as Minsk (Belarusian SSR) and Kyiv Ukrainian SSR).

== See also ==
- Moscow Victory Day Parade
