= Amur Waves International Military Bands Festival =

Annual military music event in Khabarovsk, Russia

Amur Waves International Military Bands Festival Международного Фестиваля «Амурские Волны»
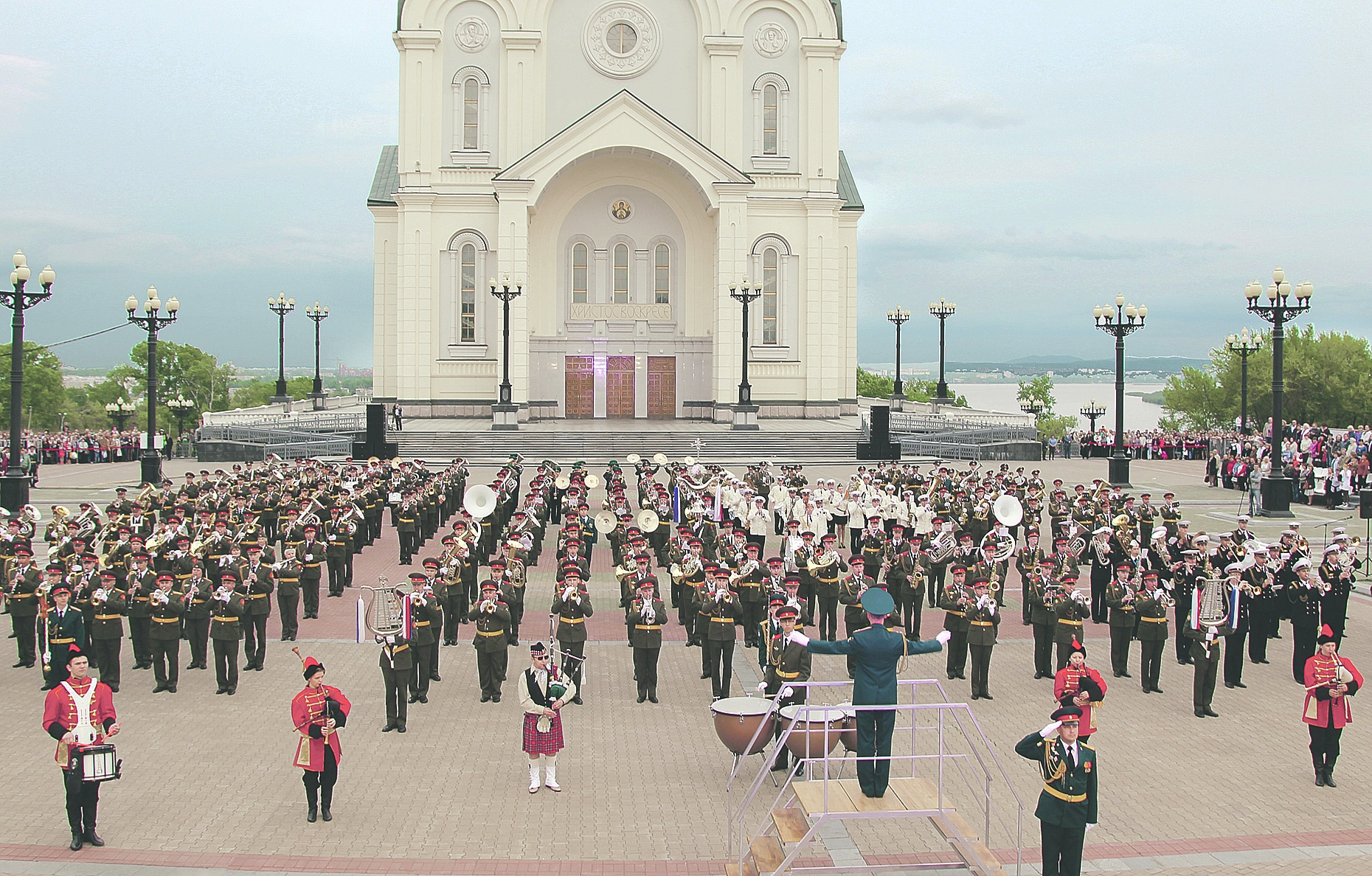
- The festival in 2017
- Genre: Concert band, military, marching
- Dates: Early summer each year
- Locations: Khabarovsk, Russia
- Years active: 2012–present

The Amur Waves International Military Bands Festival is an annual military music event and military tattoo held in Khabarovsk on Komsomolskaya Square, Glory square, Erofey arena etc.. Participating in the festival are Russian and foreign military bands, folk groups, and honor guards. The festival is considered to be one of the most significant events in the cultural life of the capital of the Russian Far East. Oleg Fedoseev is the current director of festival.

== History ==
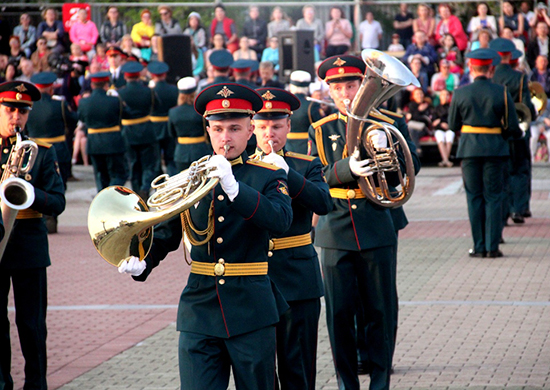
Members of the Military Band of the Eastern Military District

The idea of a military tattoo in Khabarovsk came from Lieutenant General Valery Khalilov, then in his position as director of the Military Band Service of the Armed Forces of Russia, during his visit to the city in 2009 as one of the judges for the Nikolai Mikhailov Massed Bands Contest. Seeing the potential in the contest, Khalilov saw an opportunity to create a festival similar to the Spasskaya Tower Military Music Festival and Tattoo in Moscow. The idea was endorsed by the Khabarovsk Krai government, and the Khabarovsk City Administration, and the Ministry of Culture of the Khabarovsk Krai. It was officially founded in 2012 by the Khabarovsk city administration. Since then, the festival has become hugely popular with spectators and participants. Sixteen military bands have taken part in the Festival in the since its foundation.

== Events by year ==
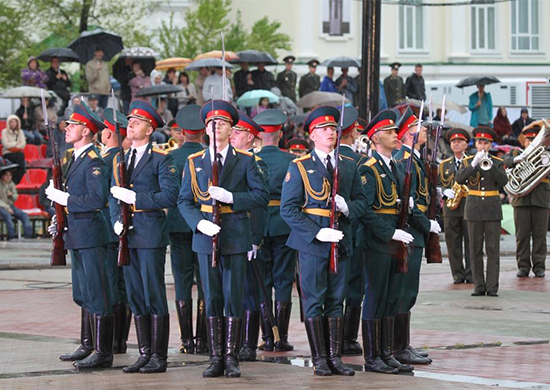
The Khabarovsk Honour Guard

- 2012 – The inaugural festival was devoted to the bicentennial of Russia’s victory in the Patriotic War of 1812 (commonly known as the French invasion of Russia).
- 2013 – Eleven foreign military bands participated in the festival in 2013, which was devoted to 155th anniversary of the founding of Khabarovsk and the 75th anniversary of Khabarovsk Krai. Among the groups was the National Folk Group of Kandong-gu district of Seoul, South Korea. For the first time the festive opening of the Festival took place in front of the Transfiguration Cathedral.
- 2015 – The festival took place in Komsomolsk-on-Amur, instead of Khabarovsk this year. The event honored the 70th anniversary of the end of the Second World War. Invitations to the festival were sent to more than 30 countries, including China, Mongolia and North Korea.
- 2016 – The festival celebrated its 5th anniversary in 2016.
- 2018 – The main performance was to honor the 160th anniversary of city and the 80th anniversary of the region, with the closing ceremony being attended by Governor Vyacheslav Shport. Transneft Far East became the general sponsor of the festival.

== Notable performers ==
=== Domestic bands ===
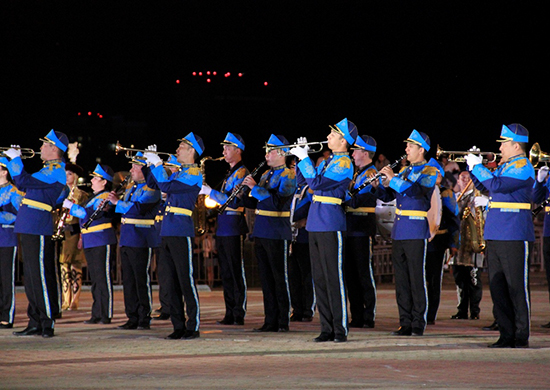
The Band of the National Guard of the Republic of Kazakhstan

- Military Band of the Eastern Military District
- Military Band of the Central Military District
- National Guard Exemplary Symphony Orchestra
- Band of the Cultural Centre of the Altai Krai Police
- Headquarters Band of the Northeast Group of Troops and Forces
- Fiesta Drum Corps of the Moscow Military Music College
- Band of the Far Eastern Higher Combined Arms Command School

=== Foreign bands ===
- Brass Band of the Military Music College of the National Defence University of Mongolia
- (United Nations) International Celtic Pipes and Drums
- (North Korea) Central Military Band of the Korean People's Army
- Band of the National Guard of the Republic of Kazakhstan
- Singapore Armed Forces Band
- Japan Ground Self-Defense Force Northern Army Band
- (China) Women's Wind Ensemble of Daxing'anling
