= Military Band of the Southern Military District =

Military band unit of the Russian Armed Forces's military band service

- Военный оркестр штаба Южного военного округа
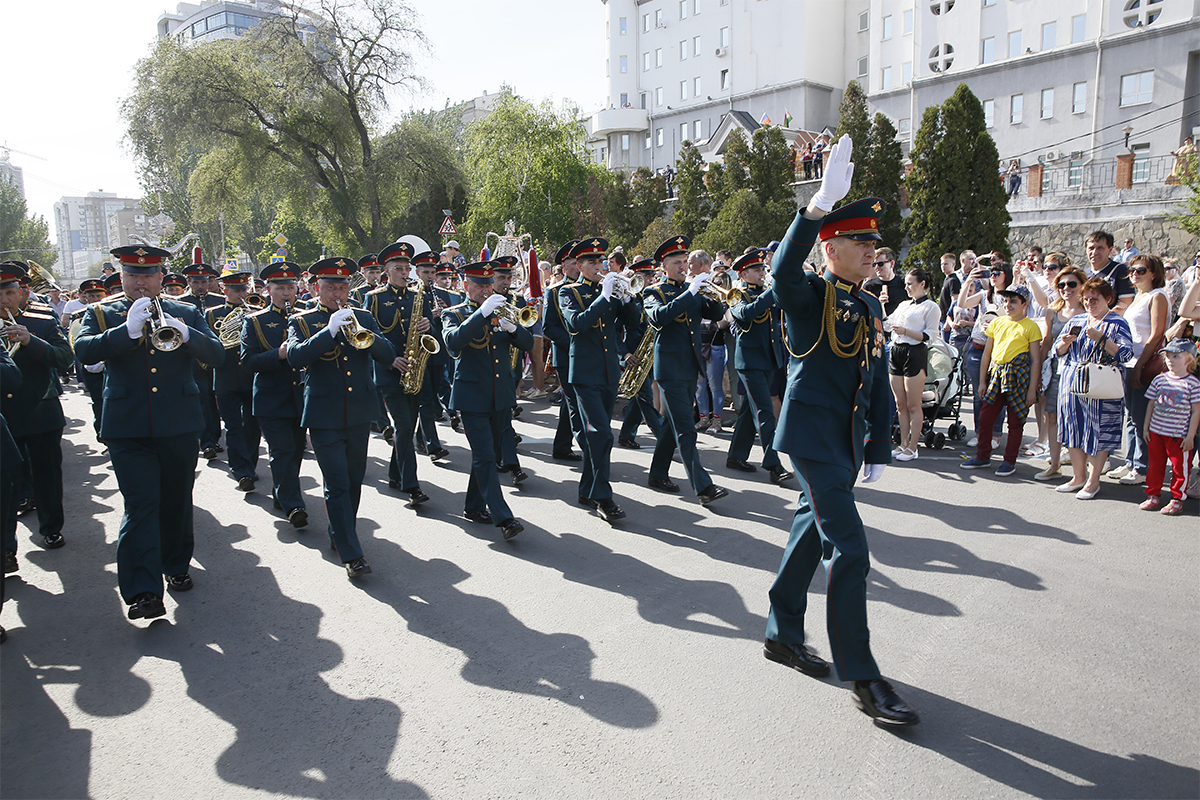
- Active: August 2, 1962 – present
- Country: Soviet Union; Russia
- Branch: Russian Armed Forces
- Type: Military Band
- Part of: 175th Luninets-Pinsk Headquarters Brigade
- Garrison/HQ: Aksay, Rostov Oblast

Commanders
- Director of Music: Andrey Golovin

Insignia

Military Band of the Southern Military District is a military band unit of the Russian Armed Forces's military band service. Currently the band serves under the headquarters of the Southern Military District based in Rostov-on-Don.

== Overview ==
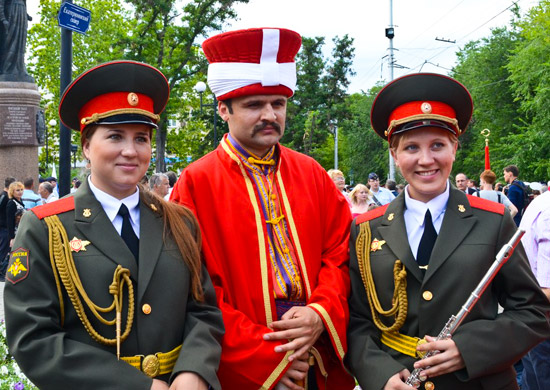
Members of the band with a member of an Ottoman military band at the Sevastopol Military Tattoo in 2013.

The Military Band of the Southern Military District was formed on August 2, 1962 on the basis of a military band in the 106th Communication Regiment with a permanent residence in Rostov-on-Don. In 2012, the band came under the command of the 175th Luninets-Pinsk Headquarters Brigade of the Southern Military District. The band has taken part in many international tattoos including the Sevastopol Military Festival in 2013, the Spasskaya Tower Military Music Festival and Tattoo in 2015 and The Amur Waves International Military Bands Festival in 2018. The band also takes part in national events in Russia such as Victory Day, Defender of the Fatherland Day and the anniversary of the Liberation of Rostov-on-Don.

== See also ==
- Military Band Service of the Armed Forces of Russia
- Military Band of the Eastern Military District
- Military Band of the Western Military District
- Military Band of the Central Military District
- Military Band of the Northern Fleet
