= Police Band Service of the Ministry of Internal Affairs of Russia =

- оркестр службы полицейский МВД России
- Active: 1918–present
- Country: USSR; Russia
- Branch: Police of Russia
- Type: Police band
- Garrison/HQ: Moscow
- Nickname: Russian Police Bands
- Agency responsible: Ministry of Internal Affairs

Commanders
- Notable commanders: Lieutenant Colonel Oleg Plotnikov

The Police Band Service of the Ministry of Internal Affairs of Russia is the official police band service of the Police of Russia, a directly reporting agency of the Ministry of Internal Affairs. The PBS-MIA-RF serves as the primary ceremonial music component of the Police of Russia, which provides bands for each of the regional and city police departments that compose this institution, together with its educational and training establishments.

== History and activities ==
The present-day Police Band Service is the heir and successor of the bands of the Imperial Police Department of Russia and traces its origins to 1918 when the bands of the Militsiya were founded by order of the then People's Commissar for Internal Affairs of the Russian SFSR, Grigory Petrovsky, who envisioned the Militsiya as a paramilitary people's national police mandated to protect the law and public security in the young republic and the bands stated to be the primary musical unit for ceremonial activities involving the service and thus were to be modeled primarily on the military bands of the then Red Army and the Soviet Navy. In January 2009, Minister Rashid Nurgaliyev approved an order which allowed pupils of music schools to join military band in the MVD. The present form of the bands was assumed in 2011 as part of the Russian police reform, which brought the police services in line with those of other countries in the world.

Currently, the police bands of the MVD take part in similar events that are conducted by the bands of the armed forces. The municipal bands commonly take part in the funeral ceremonies of police officers at the police departments. Its personnel are made up of sworn officers and agents who are trained in both military and civil music schools and conservatories.

== Composition ==
- Headquarters Band, Ministry of Internal Affairs of Russia
- Central Concert Band of the Russian Police
- Bands of Police Training and Educational Institutions of the Ministry of Internal Affairs
  - Band of the Moscow Internal Affairs University
  - Band of the Saint Petersburg Internal Affairs University
  - Band of the Krasnodar Internal Affairs University
  - Band of the Omsk Internal Affairs Academy
  - Band of the Moscow Command Academy of the MVD
  - Band of the Volgograd Internal Affairs Academy
  - Band of the All-Russia Police Staff and Developmental College of the MVD
  - Band of the Tyumen Police Institute of the MVD
  - Band of the Eastern Siberia Police Institute of the MVD
  - Band of the Kazan Police Institute of the MVD
  - Band of the Krasnodar Police Institute of the MVD
- Bands of Regional Police Directorates
  - Band of the Moscow Oblast Police
  - Band of the Volgograd Oblast Police
  - Band of the Saint Petersburg Police
  - Band of the Khabarovsk Krai Police
  - Band of the Tatarstan Police
  - Band of the Karelian Police
  - Band of the Crimean Police
  - Band of the Dagestan Police
  - Band of the Chechenya Police
  - Band of the Bashkortostan Police
  - Band of the Stavropol Krai Police
  - Band of the Novgorod Oblast Police
  - Band of the North Ossenia-Alana Police
  - Band of the Kabardino-Balkarian Police
  - Band of the Krasnodar Krai Police
  - Band of the Buryatian Police
  - Band of the Tuvan Police
- Bands of City Police Directorates
  - Central Band of the Red Banner Moscow City Police
  - HQ Band of the Sevastopol Police
  - HQ Band of the Krasnodar City Police
  - HQ Band of the Kazan Police
  - HQ Band of the Sochi Police
  - HQ Band of the Samara Police
  - HQ Band of the Volgograd City Police
  - HQ Band of the Grozny Police
  - HQ Band of the Rostov-on-Don City Police
  - HQ Band of the Ulan-Ude Police
  - HQ Band of the Simferopol City Police
  - HQ Band of the Makhachkala Police
  - HQ Band of the Novgorod Police
  - HQ Band of the Dimitrovgrad Police
  - HQ Band of the Ivanovo Police
- Bands of Municipal Police Departments and District Police Commands

The Bands of City Police Directorates, such as the Moscow Police Band, are provided by the Cultural Center of that specific directorate.

=== Band of the Ministry of Internal Affairs of Tatarstan ===
The Band of the Ministry of Internal Affairs of Tatarstan was established in 1995 under Captain Marat Kadyrov. On 17 April 1996, the first performance of the band took place in front of employees of the Ministry. In 2000, the orchestra participated in the international festival of brass bands in France, giving concerts in 16 French cities. It is one of the leading military brass bands not only in Kazan and the republic, but also in the entire Volga Federal District.

=== Band of the Altai Krai Police ===
The Band of the Altai Krai Police was organized in May 1999. At that time, members of the military band of the Barnaul Higher Military Aviation School of Pilots formed the basis of the ensemble, which was under the direction Captain Ivan Sursyakov. In 2002, the band toured the entire Altai Krai with a concert program dedicated to the 200th anniversary of the MVD. In 2003, the band was attached to the Cultural Centre under the Main Directorate and has since 2007 been directed by Vladimir Lozin. In 2012, the band won the "Silver Tunes of Fanfares" festival of Russian law enforcement agencies in Seversk.

== See also ==
- Military Band Service of the Armed Forces of Russia
- Military Band Service of the National Guard of Russia
- Police band (music)
