= Military Band of the Western Military District =

- Военный oркестр штаба Западного военного округа
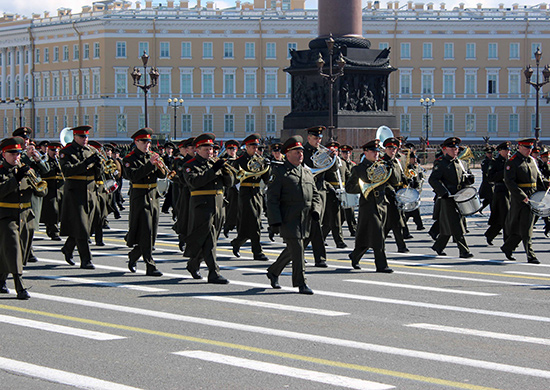
- The band on Palace Square
- Active: 1882 – present
- Country: USSR; Russia
- Branch: Western Military District
- Type: Military Band
- Size: 60
- Garrison/HQ: 54 Gorokhovaya Street, Saint Petersburg

Commanders
- Director of Music: Colonel Sergey Vovk
- Conductor: R. Plotnikov
- Notable commanders: Dmitry Pertsev

Military Band of the Western Military District is a ceremonial band unit of the Russian Armed Forces's which currently serves in the headquarters of the Western Military District. The band is one of the oldest military bands in Russia.

== History ==
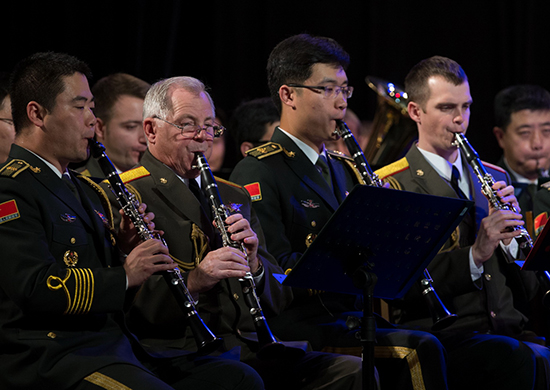
The band with musicians of the PLA Band in 2018.

Its history dates back to 1882, when Emperor Alexander III signed a decree on the establishment of the Court Brass Band. On October 1, 1917, an order was issued to disband the band due to the Russian Revolution. It was recreated in February 1918 only to be disbanded again three years later in 1921. The Petrograd city government attempted to recreate another band for the city in 1926, which only be active for four years until November 1, 1930, when a garrison band was created with Abram Genshaft becoming its first leader. During the Siege of Leningrad, the band took part in the performance of the Dmitri Shostakovich's Symphony No. 7 in 1942. After the war, the band was renamed to the Band of the Leningrad Military District in 1946. The band in its current form has been active since September 2010, when the Leningrad and Moscow military districts, and the Northern and Baltic fleets were merged.

== Gallery ==
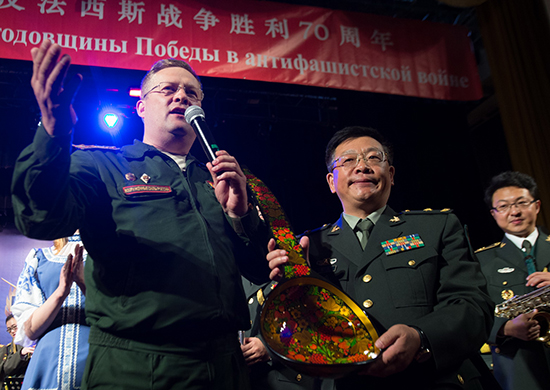
A Chinese military official with the Director of the Band of WMD, Colonel Sergei Vovk.

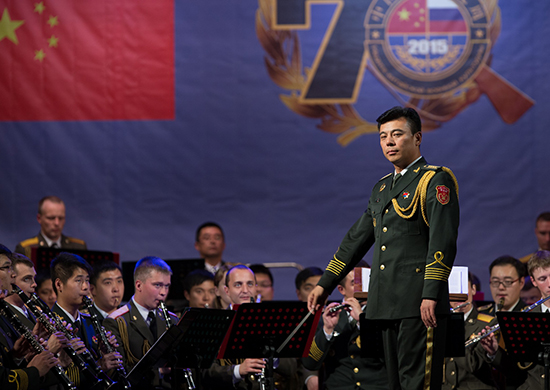
The Director of the PLA Band, Colonel Zhang Haifeng conducting members of the PLA Band and the Band of the WMD.

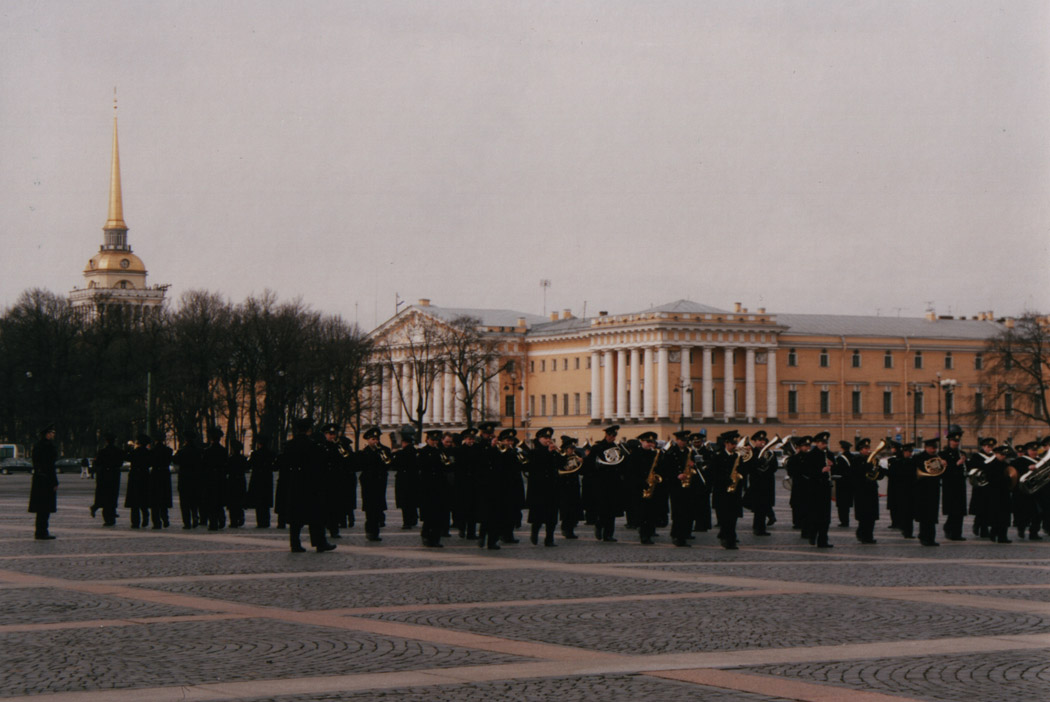
The band in their rehearsal uniform.

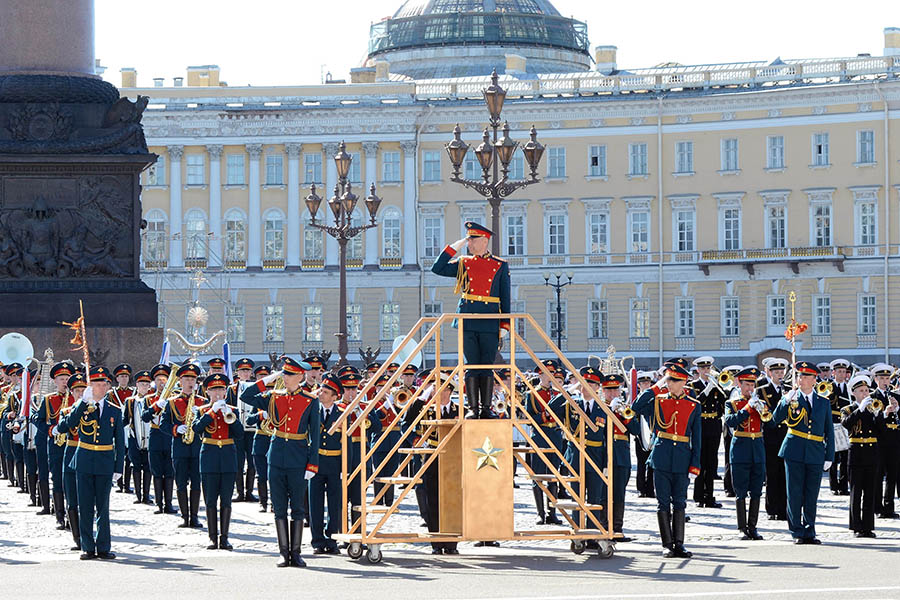
The band in their ceremonial uniform.

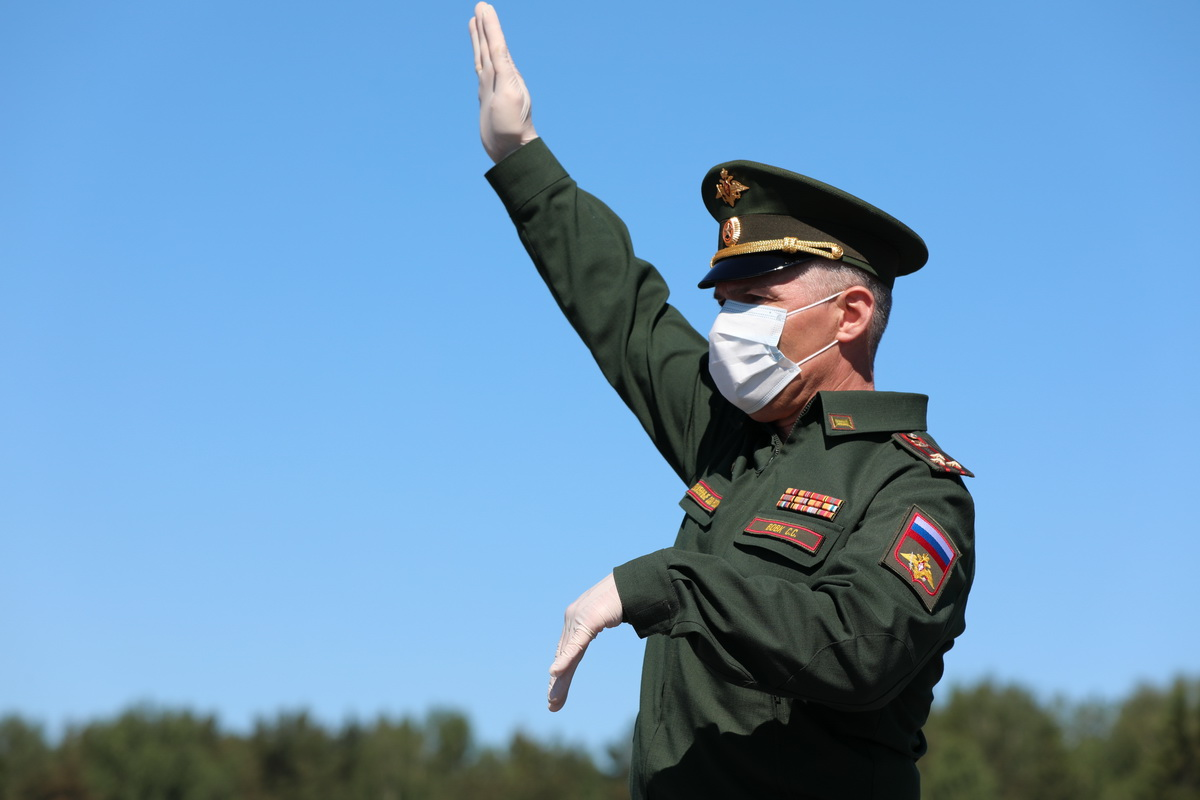
Colonel Sergei Vovk

== See also ==
- Military Band Service of the Armed Forces of Russia
- Military Band of the Southern Military District
- Military Band of the Central Military District
- Military Band of the Eastern Military District
- Military Band of the Northern Fleet

== External Media ==
- Military Band of the Leningrad Military District, 1968 Documentary
- Tchaikovsky "Festival Coronation March"
- Concert of Russian Western Military District Headquarters Band, 2014
- Autumn Dream - Western Military District Headquarters Band
- The United States Coast Guard Band and HQ Band of the Leningrad Military District performing Hands Across the Sea in 1989
