= Military Band of the Pacific Fleet =

Russian naval unit band

- Военный оркестр Тихоокеанского флота
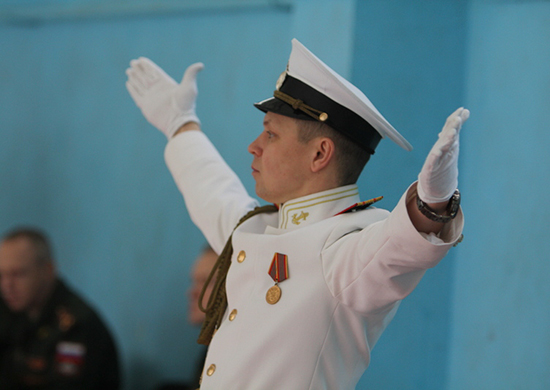
- Captain Ilya Sergeev
- Active: May 6, 1860 – present
- Country: Soviet Union; Russia
- Type: Military Band
- Size: 25
- Part of: Pacific Fleet (Russia)
- Garrison/HQ: Vladivostok

Commanders
- Director of Music: Major Andrey Popov
- Bandmaster: Captain Ilya Sergeev

Insignia
- Russian Pacific Fleet sleeve insignia

Military Band of the Pacific Fleet is a military band unit of the Pacific Fleet (Russia). It is a branch of the Military Band Service of the Armed Forces of Russia. The Band of the Russian Pacific Fleet was established on May 6, 1860, as a result of an order issued by the Russian Naval Department. The band participates in many military ceremonies, national and religious parades.

== Activities ==
Today the navy band is one of the main musical symbols of the city of Vladivostok.

The band takes part in goodwill visits of Russian warships to foreign nations in the Pacific. The band has most notably worked with the navies of the United States, China, South Korea, Vietnam, India, and Japan. Their repertoire includes overtures, rhapsodies, martial music, and songs featuring prominently original jazz, symphonic, and popular music.

== Gallery ==
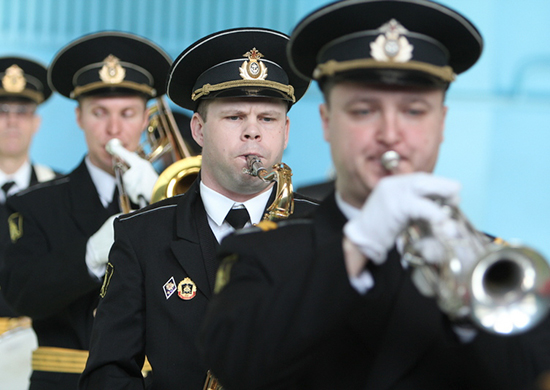

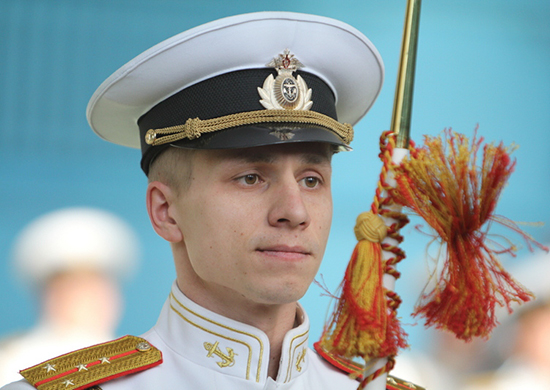

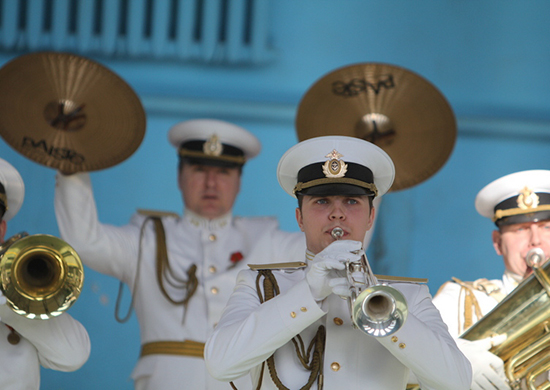

== See also ==
- Military Band Service of the Armed Forces of Russia
- Military Band of the Black Sea Fleet
- Pacific Fleet Band
