= Central Military Band of the Korean People's Army =

Ceremonial musical unit in North Korea

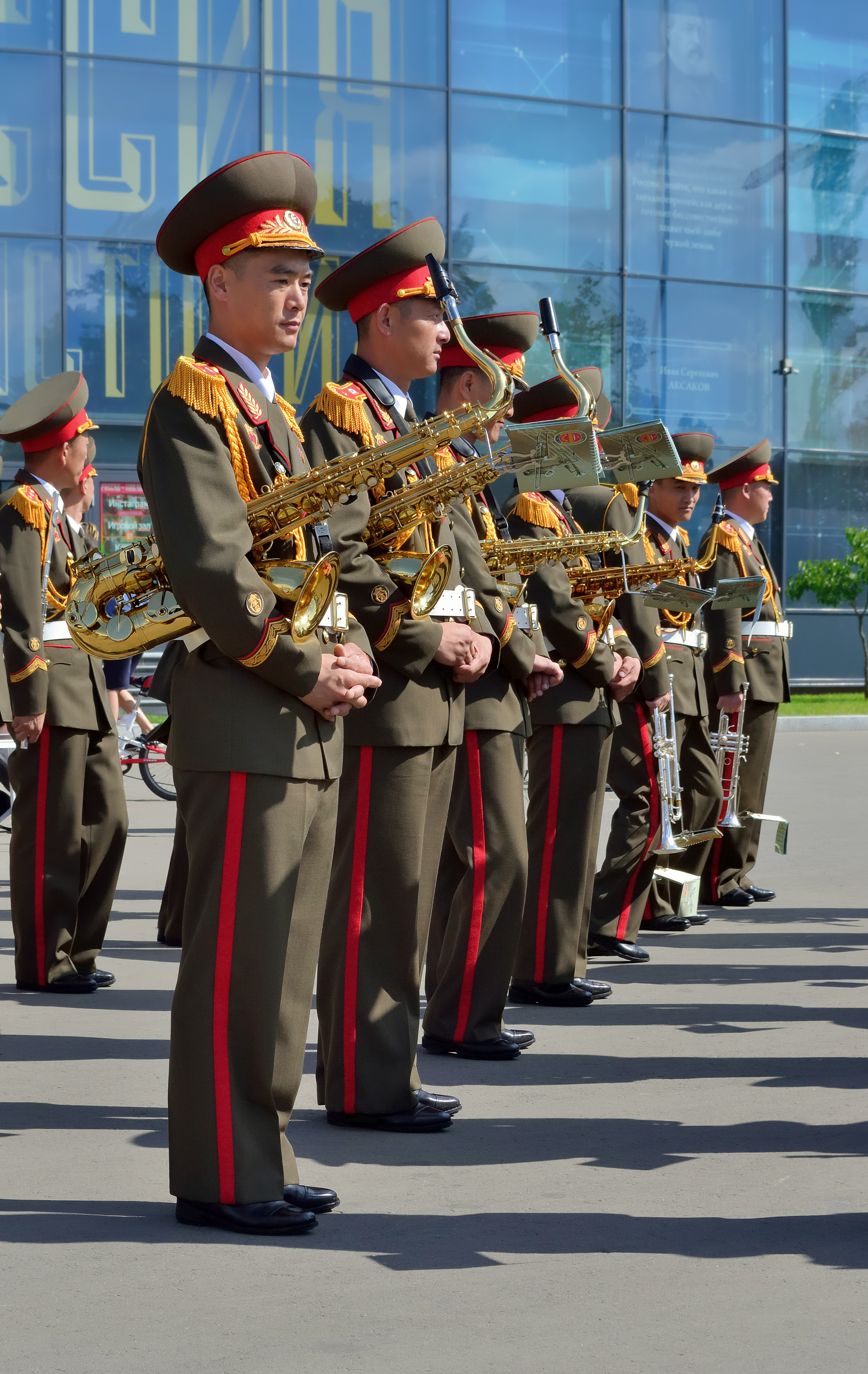
- Saxophonists of the Military Band of Korean People's Army.
- Nickname: Korean People's Army Marching Band; DPRK Army Orchestra
- Location: Pyongyang, North Korea
- Founded: February 23, 1946
- Members: over 200

- Central Military Band of the Korean People's Army
- Hangul: 조선인민군군악단
- Hanja: 朝鮮人民軍軍樂團
- RR: Joseon inmingun gunakdan
- MR: Chosŏn inmin'gun kunaktan

The Central Military Band of the Korean People's Army (Korean: 조선인민군군악단), also sometimes known as the Korean People's Army Marching Band or DPRK Army Orchestra is a North Korean musical group/marching band based in Pyongyang and is the sole military band of the Korean People's Army. The Women's Military Marching Band of the Ministry of People's Security of the DPRK is the all-female unit of the central band.

== History ==
On February 23, 1946, the Military Band of the Pyongyang Military School was created, which became the predecessor of the Band of the Korean People's Army. Its first performance was at the inaugural ceremony of the Pyongyang Institute founded by President Kim Il Sung. In June 1950, it became the Band of the Ministry of People's Security, and later that year, the band became attached as a unit of the Supreme Guard Command's Honor Guard Battalion. By September 1954, full control of the band was given to the Ministry of Public Security, serving for the remainder of the Cold War and the 1990s before being reorganized into a separate entity in June 1998 as a directly reporting unit of the General Political Bureau of the Korean People's Army, tasked as the primary unit for the military music activities throughout the whole KPA.

== Activities ==
The CMB-KPA, as the premier and principal band of the whole KPA, presides over all garrison and unit bands within the KPA's service branches and the Worker-Peasant Red Guards. North Korean leader Kim Jong Un has described the band as one that is "instilling revolutionary enthusiasm and fighting spirit into all the service personnel and people."

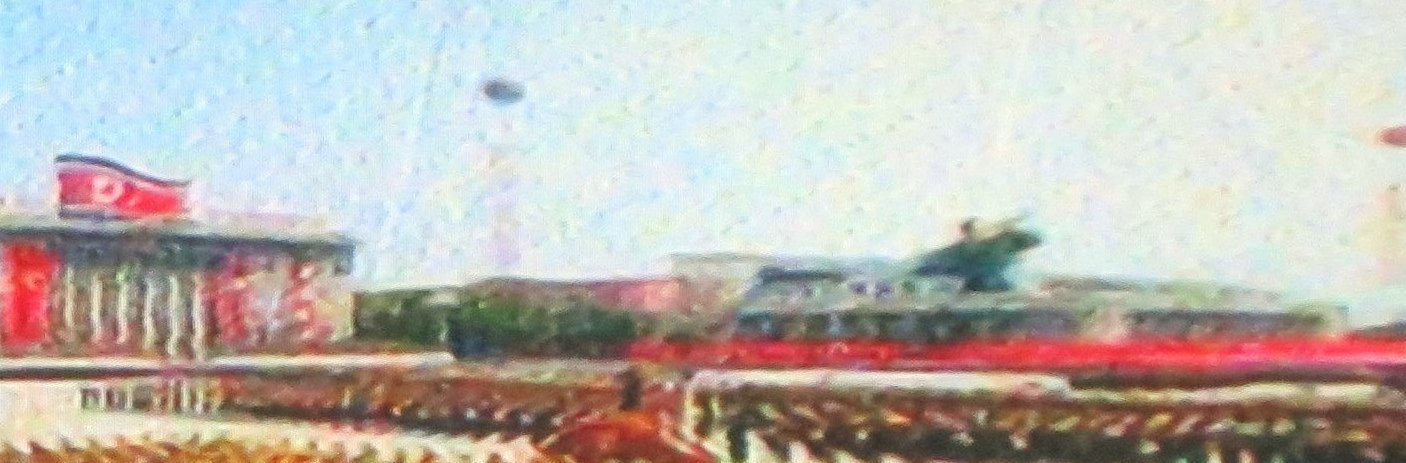
The band on Kim Il Sung Square

The band is similar to United States college marching bands in that they both solely specialize in military style marching, notably during ceremonial parades and public performances. The band has been known to play pop, brass & military music during many of its performances.

=== Parades and ceremonies ===
- Military parades in North Korea
  - Party Foundation Day (parades on jubilee years)
  - Military Foundation Day (parades on jubilee years)
  - Day of the Foundation of the Republic (parades on jubilee years)
  - Day of the Sun (2012, 2017, 2022 parades)
- State funeral of Kim Il Sung
- State funeral of Kim Jong Il

=== Performances ===
==== Notable concerts ====
- Concert for the state visit of Russian President Vladimir Putin (2000)
- Joint concert with the Central Military Band of the People's Liberation Army of China in honor of the 60th anniversary of the Korean Armistice (2013)
- Joint concert with the Central Military Band of the Ministry of Defense of Russia in Pyongyang (2014)
- 70th anniversary concert (2016)

==== Festivals ====
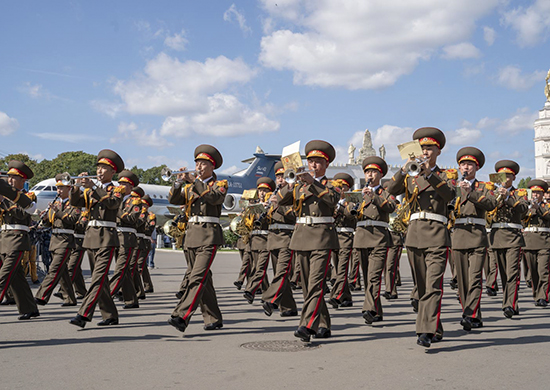
The band in Moscow in August 2019.

- The Amur Waves International Military Bands Festival (2012 and 2015)
- Spasskaya Tower Military Music Festival and Tattoo (2019)

== See also ==
- Korean People's Army
- Korean People's Army State Merited Chorus and Symphony Orchestra
- Music of North Korea
