= Military Band of the Eastern Military District =

Military band unit of the Russian Armed Forces

- Военный оркестр штаба Восточного военного округа
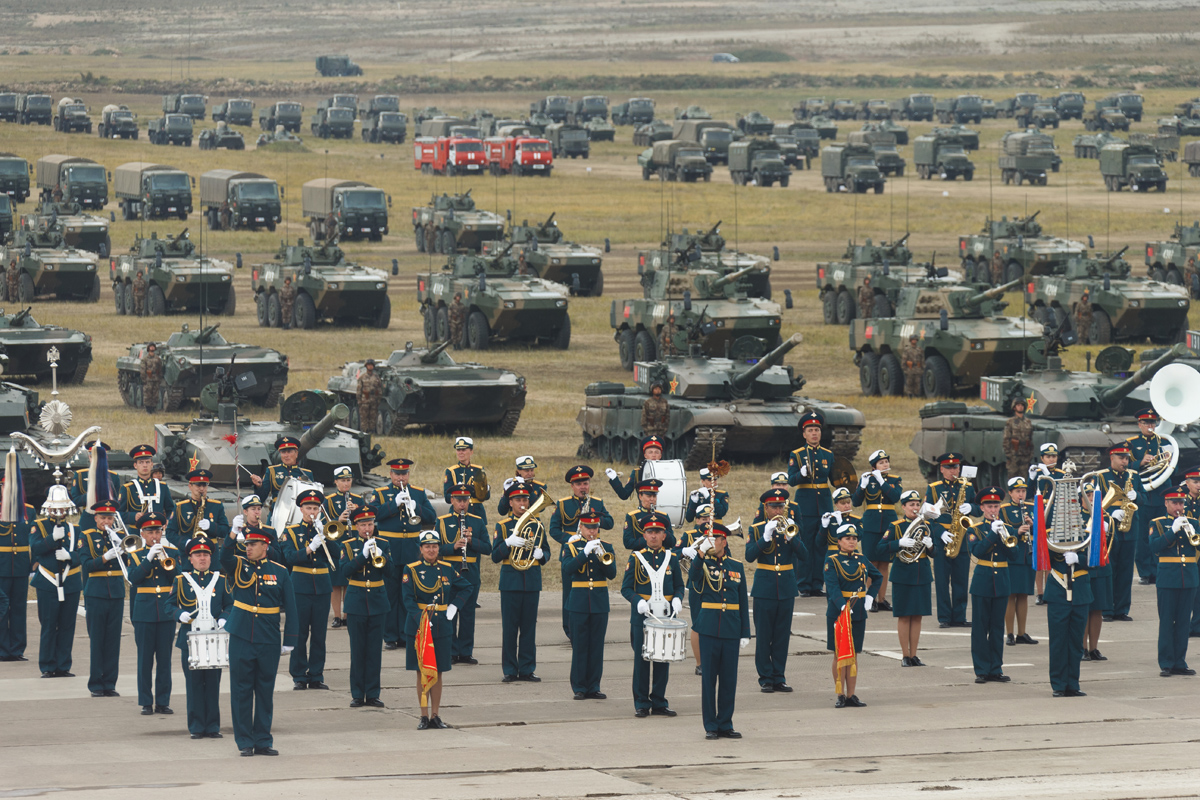
- The band at the Vostok 2018 maneuvers.
- Active: 1946 – present
- Country: Soviet Union; Russia
- Branch: Russian Armed Forces
- Type: Military Band
- Part of: Eastern Military District
- Garrison/HQ: Khabarovsk

Commanders
- Current commander: Colonel Vadim Pakhamov

The Military Band of the Eastern Military District is a military band unit of the Russian Armed Forces. It is a branch of the Military Band Service of the Armed Forces of Russia. The band mainly performs in Khabarovsk and in cities in the Eastern Military District. It is the oldest creative collective in the Russian Far East.

== History of bands in the Far East ==
By order of the Emperor and the decision of the State Council in January 1884, a district copper music choir was formed in the city of Khabarovsk under the Directorate of Troops of the Amur Region. It performed duties outlined by military regulations. During the Russo-Japanese War, military musicians took part in combat battles for the Imperial Russian Army. The modern military band was founded in 1946 by order of Marshal of the Soviet Union Rodion Malinovsky, to represent the military of the newly formed district in neighboring China. At that time, there was military band in Khabarovsk, with military musicians being seconded on this from the city of Chita, where the district administration headquarters was based.

== Overview of activities ==
It performs on holidays such as Victory Day (9 May) and Defender of the Fatherland Day (23 February). Over the years, the band has performed throughout the Far East: visited cities like Sakhalin and Kamchatka, in Primorye. The band participated in the First International Festival of Wind Orchestras in Beijing in 1995 and the International Festival of Military Orchestras in Wonju in 2004 and 2011. It has also participated in the Spasskaya Tower Military Music Festival and Tattoo. Since 2012, it has opened the Amur Waves International Military Bands Festival. The band is a laureate of many international competitions and festivals both abroad and in Russia. In 1981, the band was awarded the title "Laureate of the Khabarovsk Komsomol Prize". In September 2019, it took part in a review of military bands in Moscow front of Major General Timofey Mayakin as well as an exhibition on Red Square. The creative achievements of the band were marked with certificates of honor from the leadership of the Khabarovsk Territory, the Minister of Defense and the district commander. The band currently numbers more than fifty performers.

== Gallery ==
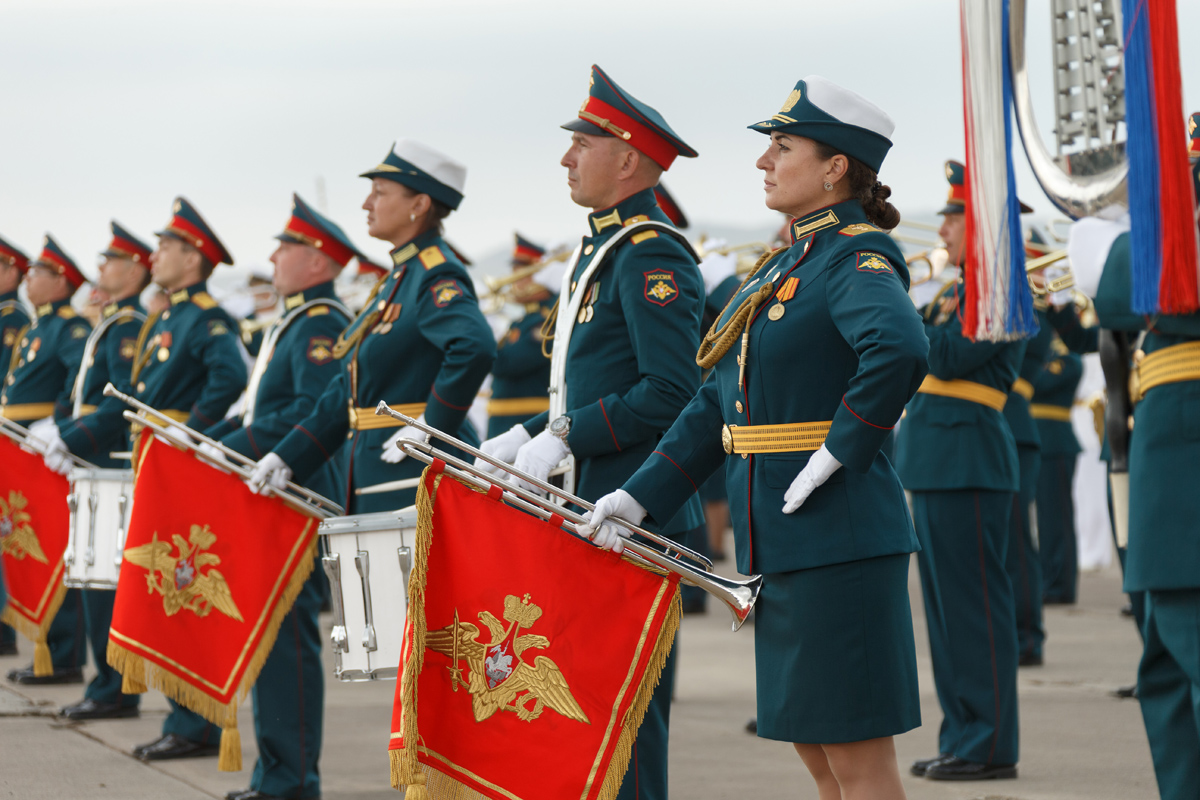
Female trumpists from the band.

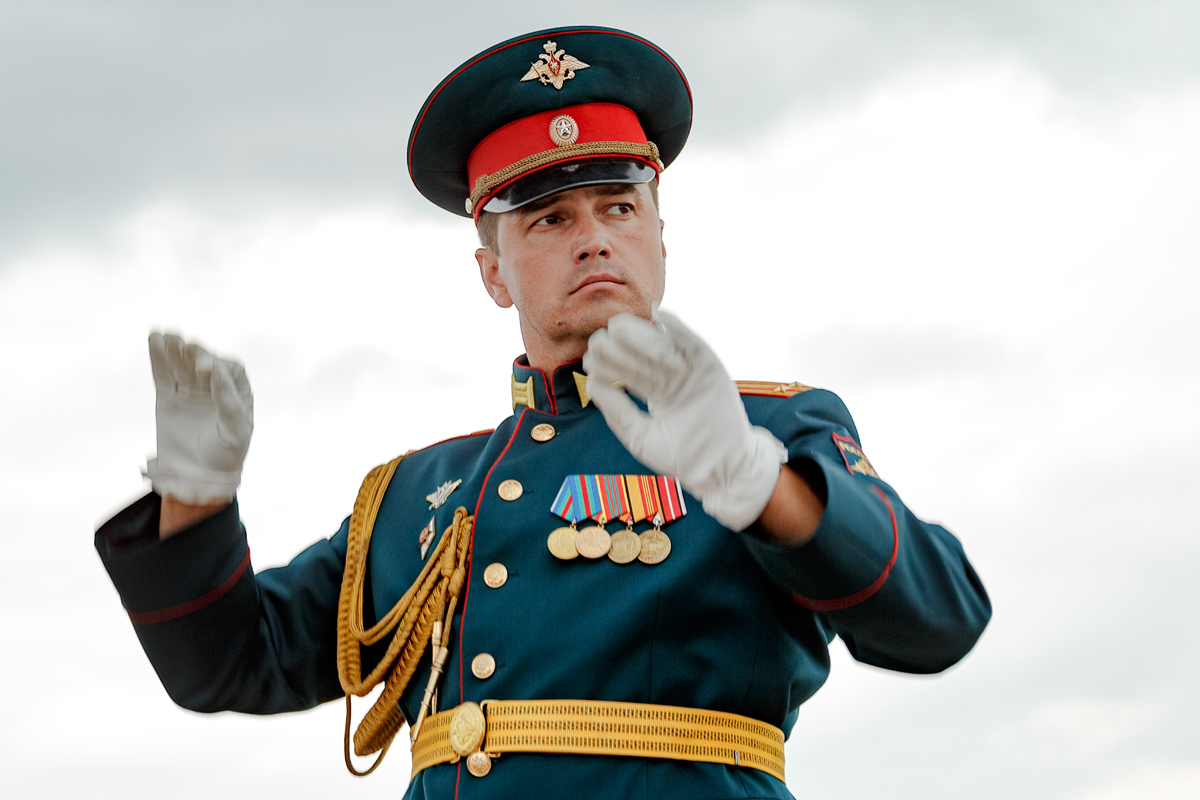
Lieutenant Colonel Vadim Pakhamov, Director of the band.

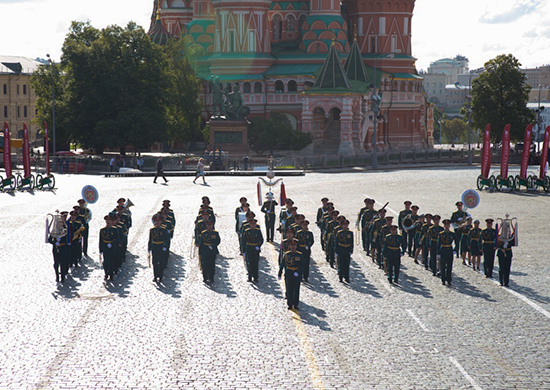
The band on Red Square.

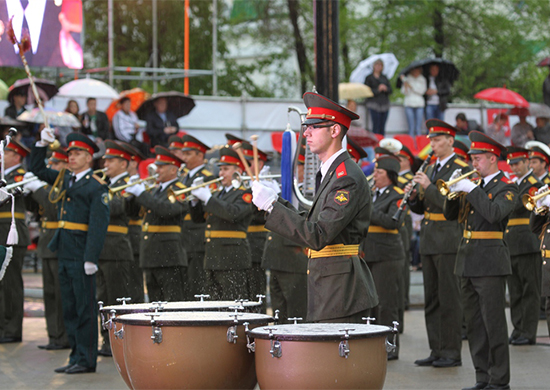
A bandmember at Amur Waves International Military Bands Festival.

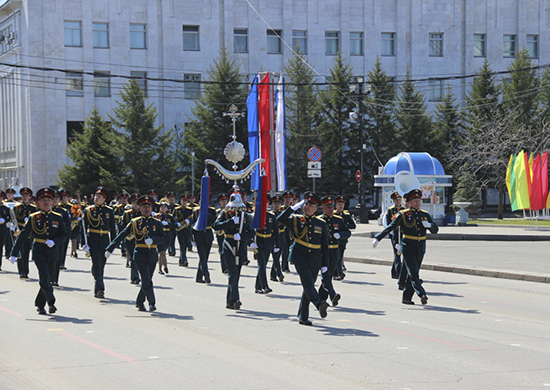
The band during a Victory Day Parade.

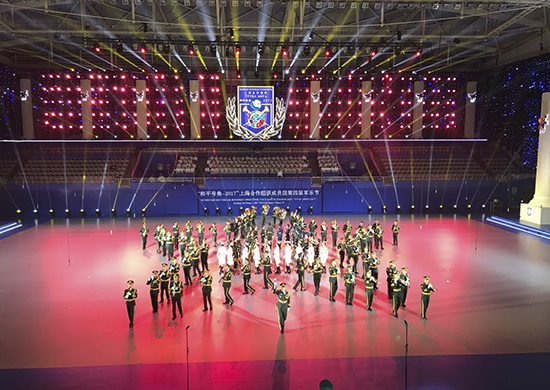
The band performing at the International Peace Trumpet-2017 Festival in China.

== See also ==
- Military Band Service of the Armed Forces of Russia
- Military Band of the Western Military District
- Military Band of the Southern Military District in Rostov-on-Don
- Military Band of the Central Military District
- Military Band of the Northern Fleet
