= Semyon Chernetsky =

Soviet military composer (1881–1950)

- Семён Чернецкий
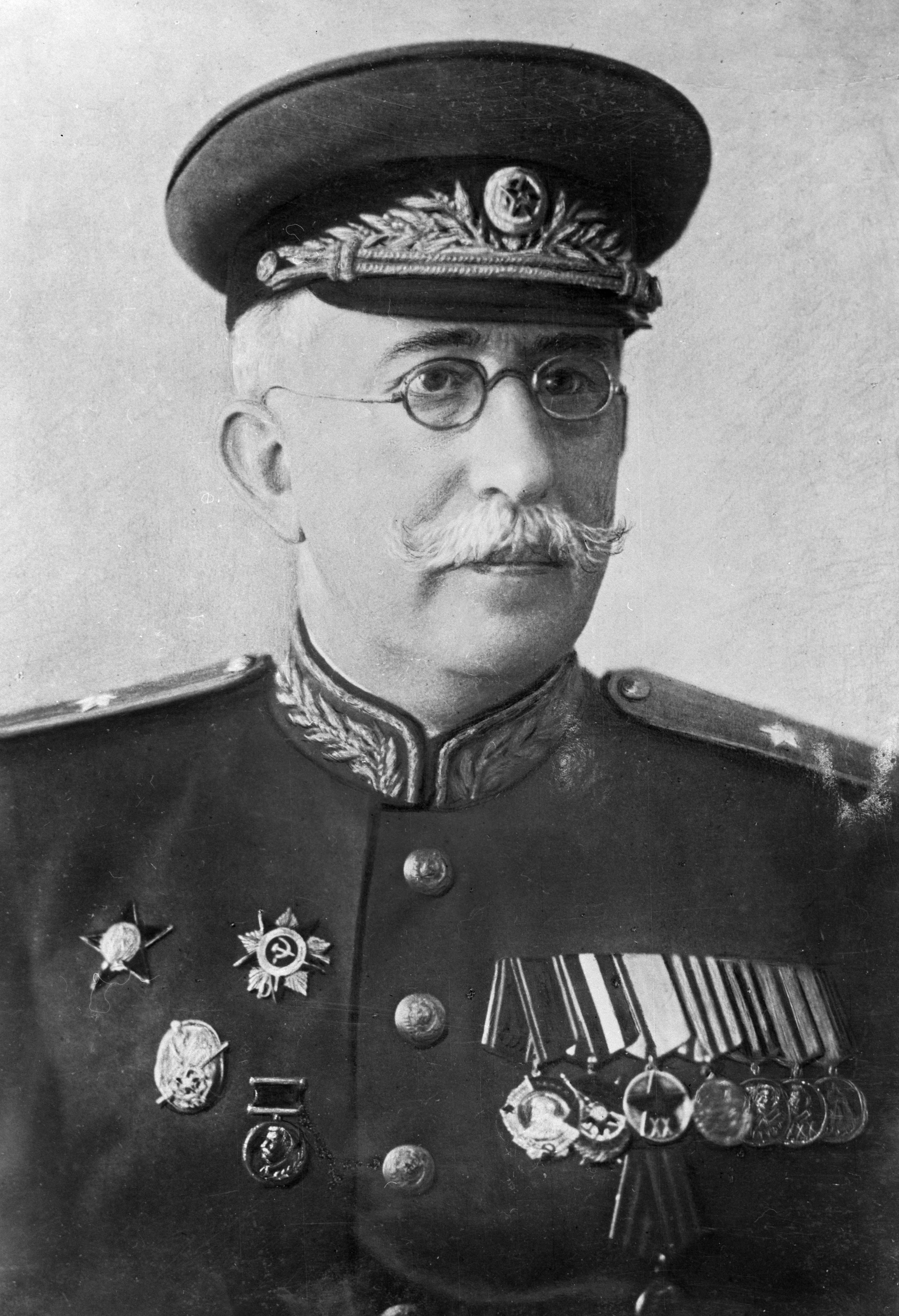
- Born: Solomon Isayevich Chernetsky; 24 October 1881; Odessa, Russian Empire (now Ukraine)
- Died: 13 April 1950 (aged 68); Moscow, RSFSR, Soviet Union
- Burial place: Novodevichy Cemetery
- Military career
- Allegiance: Russian Empire; Soviet Union
- Branch: Imperial Russian Army; Red Army
- Service years: 1924–1946
- Rank: Major General
- Commands: Central Military Orchestra of the People's Commissariat of National Defense

Semyon Aleksandrovich Chernetsky (Note: Russian: Семен Александрович Чернецкий) (born Solomon Isayevich Chernetsky; (Note: Russian: Соломон Шаевич Чернецкий) 23 October [O.S. 11 October] 1881 – 13 April 1950) was a Soviet military composer and conductor. He is credited as the founder of modern Russian military bands. He served as the Senior Director of the Central Military Band of the People's Commissariat of National Defense of the USSR from 1924 to 1950.

== Early life and family ==
Tchernetsky was born on 24 October 1881 in Odessa to a musical family. He was born Solomon Isayevich Chernetsky, a Jewish name which he russified in 1917 to Semyon Aleksandrovich. His father, Isay Aleksandrovich Shtember, was a violinist and violin teacher. His mother, Dora Isayevna Chernetskaya, was a piano teacher. His cousin Lev would later become the bandmaster of the 8th Don Cossack Regiment of the 8th Cavalry Division based at Odessa.

== Early musical career ==
From 1892-1893, Chernetsky studied the trombone in the orchestra of the 24th Dragoon Lubny Regiment (later the 8th Lubny Hussar Regiment, 2nd Brigade, 8th Cavalry Division) in Kishinev, Bessarabia Governorate (now Chișinău, Moldova), where his uncle Issac was the conductor. In 1900, due to the difficult financial situation of the family, after the death of his father and without graduating from college, he was sent to Kishinev to live with Issac. In Kishinev, he graduated from the music classes of the local branch of the Imperial Russian Musical Society and decided to devote himself to military music. At first he tried his hand as an assistant to his uncle, and in 1903 he himself became bandmaster of the 14th Artillery Brigade (part of the 15th Infantry Division of the Imperial Russian Army). In the same year, during the Kishinev pogrom, he participated in the organization of self-defense, and as a result was seriously wounded and lost his left eye. In 1911 he entered the Saint Petersburg Conservatory, which he graduated in 1917.

== Leadership of Red Army bands ==
In 1918, Chernetsky joined the Red Army and was appointed as the head of the military bands of the Petrograd military district. He quickly rose through the ranks, eventually being appointed as the director of the Military Band of the Workers and Peasants Red Army in 1924. After more than 10 years in this position, he formed the Central Military Band of the People's Commissariat of National Defense, which later became the first military band to be formed in modern Russia. In 1935, together with professor Heinrich Neuhaus at the Moscow Conservatory, he created the Military Faculty of the Moscow State Conservatory, where music students get a curriculum based on the conducting and combat repertoire. On 1 August 1937, Cherneysky founded the Moscow Military Music College as a means of building and enhancing the knowledge of potential military musicians in the Red Army. On 24 June 1945, Chernetsky led the massed bands during the Moscow Victory Parade of 1945 on Red Square.

== Later life ==
In 1946, he suffered from a paralysis, which resulted in his retirement from active service after 25 years in the armed forces. Tchernetsky died on 13 April 1950 in Moscow. He is buried at Novodevichy Cemetery.

== Legacy ==
Chernetsky is highly regarded in the Russian military music sphere and one of the most outstanding Russian military composers in the 20th century. Depending on sources, he wrote between 100-200 marches, patriotic songs and other works in his lifetime. In addition to military marches, he also wrote some socio-political ones such as Glory to the Motherland, Lenin's Call and the March of Moscow Pioneers. Many of his military marches are the most famous and common ones used by the Russian Military Band Service, some of which have been used during Victory Day Parades and November 7 Parades on Moscow's Red Square for decades.

== Compositions ==
Marches

- Marcia Solenne (1915), Festive March for Mandolins;
- Ceremonial March of the Red Army (1922), compiled and arranged, consists of the songs: Nagaechka, Stenka Razin, Dubinushka, The Sun Rises, Boldly, Comrades, Varshavyanka, Internationale;
- Lenin's Call (1924), for symphony and brass band, also known as March for a ceremonial march, dedicated to K. E. Voroshilov;
- Counter march No. 1 (1927), for rifle units, dedicated to M.I. Kalinin;
- Meeting march of universities (1928), dedicated to I. E. Yakir;
- Counter march No. 2 (1930), dedicated to L. P. Malinovsky;
- Counter march No. 3 (1930), dedicated to V.N. Levichev;
- Industrial with anvils, dedicated to the mechanized and motorized units of the Red Army;
- March of collective farmers, processing;
- GTO (1933), processed, recorded June 28, 1936;
- Birobidzhan March (1934), for symphony orchestra, recorded in 1939 by the NKO brass band;
- Moscow Pioneers (1937), based on the themes of the songs: Krasnoarmeyskaya Physical Culture, Pervomayskaya, Konnoarmeyskaya, arrangement and orchestration, dedicated to the Moscow House of Pioneers;
- March of the Timurites;
- Taranga (1937), for symphony orchestra;
- Cossack March (1936), Cossack song from the opera Virgin Soil Upturned by I. Dzerzhinsky, dedicated to the Red Cossacks, based on the themes of songs by I. Dzerzhinsky, recorded by the NKO Orchestra in 1937;
- Georgian March (1936), arrangement and orchestration;
- Bessarabian March (1940), also known as Soviet Moldova, in memory of the hero G. I. Kotovsky;
- Red Banner Komsomol (1936), for symphony orchestra;
- Ukrainian March No. 1 (1936), for symphony orchestra;
- Ukrainian March No. 2 (1936), on Ukrainian folk themes, arrangement and instrumentation;
- Ukrainian March No. 3 from Ukrainian Folk Songs (1936–1937), arrangement and instrumentation;
- Life has become more fun (1936–1937), arrangement based on the song by A. V. Alexandrov Life has become better;
- Column March (1937), together with F. Keneman, dedicated to the Moscow Proletarian Division;
- Georgian Column March (1937);
- Youth (1937), from the songs of M. Blanter Youth and Partizan-Zheleznyak, arrangement and orchestration;
- Cavalry lynx (1937), arrangement of the Ukrainian folk song Gandzia and Songs of Past Campaigns by 3. Kompaneets;
- Red Banner Ensemble (1937);
- March of Osoaviakhim (presumably 1937);
- Marching march (march by S. N. Vasilenko) (1938), arrangement and orchestration;
- Our Homeland (1938), from songs by I. Dunaevsky and L. Revutsky, arrangement and instrumentation;
- Under the Flag of the People's Commissar (1938), from songs by Y. Khait, arrangement and instrumentation;
- March-Parade (1940);
- Ceremonial march (1940), together with Z. Feldman, for the 20th anniversary of the First Cavalry Army;
- Anatoly Krokhalev (1940);
- March of the First Ukrainian Front (1941), recorded 1945;
- March of the 84th Guards Order of Suvorov Division (1944), also known as the March of the Leningrad Guards Rifle Divisions since 1947;
- Meeting march of the military schools of the Red Army (1941);
- March of the Special Cavalry Brigade of the People's Commissariat of Defense (1941), also known as Counter March No. 2;
- Counter march of the First Guards Cavalry Corps (1942);
- Counter march of the Second Guards Cavalry Corps (1942);
- Counter march of the Third Guards Cavalry Corps (1942);
- March of the 8th Guards Rifle Division named after General Panfilov (1942);
- Slavic March (1942);
- Victory is ours (1942), dedicated to the heroic Red Army;
- Fanfare March of the Guards Divisions (1942);
- March of the First Guards Rifle Division (1942);
- March of the First Guards Moscow Motor Rifle Division (1942);
- For a Just Cause (1942);
- March of military topographers (1942);
- March of Bomber Aviation (1942);
- Guards No. 4 (1942);
- March of the Tankmen (1943);
- March of the Mortar Guards (1943);
- Heroes of Stalingrad (1943);
- Hero of Azerbaijan (1943);
- Jubilee counter march of the Red Army (25 years of the Red Army) (1943), also known as Suvorov's Counter March;
- Native Donbass (1944);
- March of the 53rd Guards Rifle Division (1944);
- March of the 3rd Guards Rifle Division (1944);
- Salute to Moscow (1944);
- Victory march (fanfare) Glory to the Motherland (1944);
- The entry of the Red Army into Bucharest (1944);
- The entry of the Red Army into Budapest (1945);
- Victory Day (May 9, 1945) (1945), dedicated to the Soviet occupation forces in Germany;
- Heroic March 'Victory Feast', dedicated to Marshal Georgy Zhukov (1946);
- Russian March (1945);
- Free Bulgaria (1945);
- March of the Frunze Academy (1945);
- Marshal Rokossovsky (1945);
- Greetings to the Red Navy sailors (1945);
- USSR - England - USA (1945);
- March of the Labor Reserves (1945);
- Counter march of artillery (1945);
- Tankers' counter march (1945);
- March of the Artillerymen (1945);
- March of the Guards Artillery (1945);
- Meeting of the victors (1945);
- March Moscow (1947);
- Eastern fantasy, march Friendship of the Peoples of the USSR;
- March of the Paratrooper, recorded in 1948;
- Dosarm (presumably 1948), Concert march;
- Counter Marches 1, 2, 3 (1949), instrumentation for symphonic (G. Yu. Cherny) and brass (B. G. Miller) orchestras.

== Awards ==
- Honored Artist of the RSFSR (1936)
- Stalin Prize (1946)
- Order of Lenin
- Order of the Red Banner
- Order of the Patriotic War
- Order of the Red Star
- Medal "20 Years of the Red Army" (1938)

== See also ==
- Military Band Service of the Armed Forces of Russia
