= Dmitry Pertsev =

Soviet military music composer

- Born: 24 February 1913; Izmalkovsky, Oryol, Russia
- Died: 24 March 1996 (aged 83); Russia
- Military career
- Allegiance: Soviet Union
- Branch: Soviet Armed Forces
- Service years: 1941–1978
- Rank: Lieutenant colonel

Dmitry Illarionovich Pertsev (Russian: Дмитрий Илларионович Перцев) was a Soviet military officer, conductor, and composer. He served as director of music for the Military Band Service of the Leningrad Military District from 1965 to 1977.

== Early life and career ==
Between 1934 and 1937 he studied at the Kiev Conservatory. Upon graduation, he immediately transferred to the Military Faculty of the Moscow Conservatory in the conducting class of S. A. Chernetsky and M. M. Bagrinovsky, where he would graduate in 1941. Over the 24-year period that followed, he served in various military band positions throughout the country, having served as the director for the Moscow and Volga Military Districts, the Central Group of Forces and a teacher at a Rostov school of military musicians in the mid 50s. In 1964, he was awarded the title of Honoured Artist of the RSFSR. A year later, he became the director of music of the Military Band Service of the Leningrad Military District and the artistic director of the Headquarters Band of the LenVo. During his time as director, he presided over the massed bands during the last International Workers' Day military parade in the city in 1968 and was featured in a documentary that sane year on Soviet military music. He retired in 1977 from this post and became a teacher a year later at the Leningrad Institute of Culture (now the Saint-Petersburg State University of Culture and Arts), which he would stay at until his death in 1996.

== Compositions ==
In order by year:

- Slow March (1952)
- Phalanx March (1956)
- March "Leningrad" (1958)
- On Guard of the Homeland (1960)
- Solemn Overture "Feat" (1964)
- Column March (1970)
- Anniversary March (1973)

Many of his military marches (particularly Slow March and Phalanx March) are common pieces that are used by the used by the bands of the Military Band Service of the Armed Forces of Russia as well as the band services of countries in the former Soviet Union (such as Belarus, Armenia, the breakaway Republic of Abkhazia and until 2014, Ukraine) for grand military parades or as a general purpose marching song.

== See also ==
- Russian military bands
