= Military Band of the Black Sea Fleet =

Russian naval unit band

- Военный Оркестр Черноморского Флота
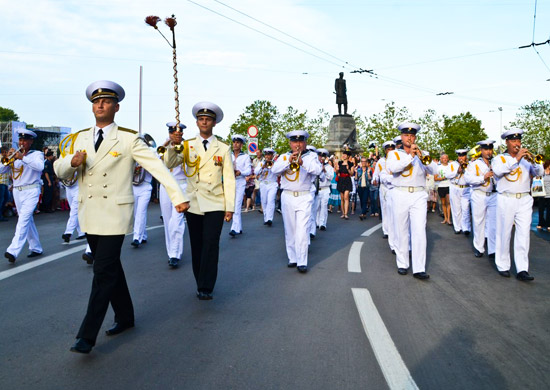
- Active: February 24, 1947 – present
- Country: Soviet Union; Russia
- Type: Military Band
- Garrison/HQ: Sevastopol

Commanders
- Director: Senior Lieutenant Mikhail Khalilov
- Ceremonial chief: Captain 3rd Rank Alexander Sviridenko

Military Band of the Black Sea Fleet is a military band unit of the Russian Armed Forces. It is a branch of the Military Band Service of the Armed Forces of Russia. It has performed tasks assigned during official visits of the ships of the Black Sea Fleet to countries with diplomatic with Russia since 1980. Since December 2009, the orchestra has been led by Senior Lieutenant Mikhail Khalilov.

== History ==
It was formed on February 24, 1947 in the city of Sevastopol. In 1966, the orchestra was reorganized as the Headquarters Military Band of the 34th Black Sea Fleet.

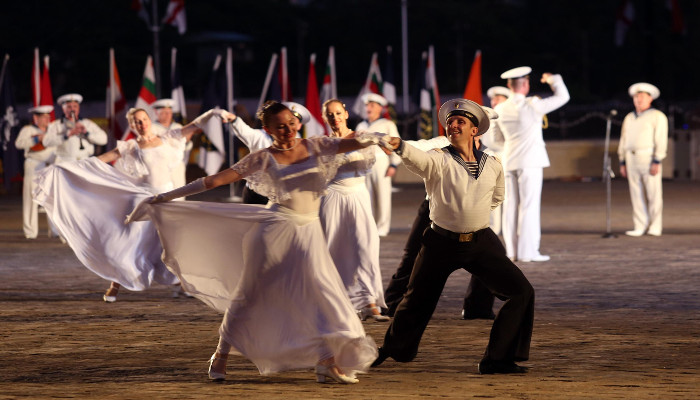
The band at the Indian Navy Day celebrations in 2019.

In 2001, the Ministry of Culture of Russia granted the Orchestra the honor of opening the Festival of Russian Culture in the city of Cannes, France. On February 9, 2012, the 34th Military Band of the Black Sea Fleet was given its current name.

== See also ==
- Military Band Service of the Armed Forces of Russia
- Military Band of the Eastern Military District
