= Altai Krai Police =

Russian police agency

Main Directorate for Internal Affairs of Altai Krai ГУ МВД России по Алтайскому краю
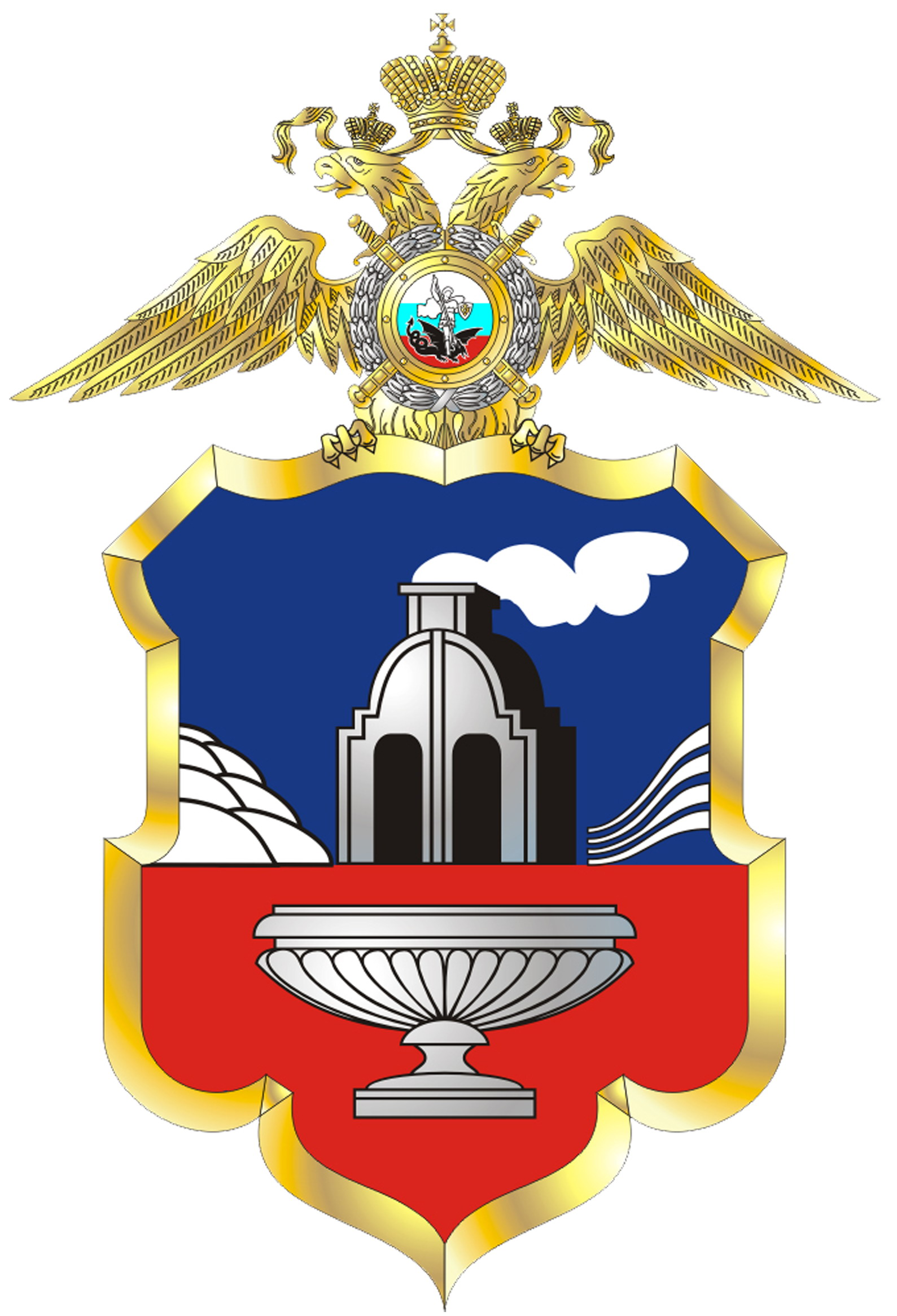
- Abbreviation: ГУ МВД России по АК
- Motto: Служа закону, служим народу By serving the law, we serve the people

Jurisdictional structure
- Operations jurisdiction: RUS
- Governing body: MVD
- General nature: Local civilian police

Operational structure
- Agency executive: Aleksander Laas, Head of Police
- Parent agency: MVD
- Child agency: Politsiya

Website
- Official Website

The Main Directorate for Internal Affairs of Altai Krai (Russian: Главного управления Министерства внутренних дел Российской Федерации по Алтайскому краю) or the Altai Krai Police is the main law enforcement agency in the Government of Altai Krai in Southern Russia.

The central headquarters are in Barnaul.

== History ==
The Altai Police was formed by decree in 1782.

In May 1785, the head of police was Ivan Tersky, who led the policing reform in 1785–1787. In those years, a mountain battalion of the Barnaul Police was formed.

Until 1919, the Barnaul Police was the central law enforcement in Altai Krai. In 1919, the Czarist police was renamed the People's and Workers' Militia. In 1920, the police was a part of the local NKVD and they took part in the repression of dissidents. During the second half of 1937, 13,534 people were arrested, with 7,437 of them sentenced to death by shooting.

After World War II and during the Cold War, the police suffered extensive cuts and major reforms.

In 1991, the Ministry for Internal Affairs of Altai was established as the main policing body, with Felix Trotsenko as its first minister. After a few years, the Ministry become Main Directorate. In 1992, the Directorate against Organized Crime (GUBOP) was created to deal with this growing problem. Under the new ministry were formed the police special forces: Special unit for rapid reaction (SOBR), and the OMON units in Barnaul and Biisk.

Since September 2005, the headmaster of the police is Lieutenant-General Alexander Oldak. The police is divided into 72 regional and municipal departments. In 2006, the aviation detachment for special purposes was formed, having armed with Mi-8AMT.

The police car fleet was only updated in 2007, at the expense of regional and federal budgets, with the police purchasing more than 100 cars and buses.

On 13 May 2013, Alexander Laas was appointed by the Federal Minister for Internal Affairs as the new head of the Altai Krai Police.

== Structure ==
- Central Investigation Department
- Department of organization of the Spetsnaz
- Directorate for public order
- Zonal dog service center
- Department for records and mode
- Center for licenses and permits
- Department of inquiry
- Department for regional departments
- Office for Combating Economic Crimes
- Directorate for private security
- Main Directorate for Traffic Safety (GAI)
- The Personnel Office
- Department of Internal Security
- The Center for Combating offenses in the consumer market and the implementation of administrative law
- Forensic Center
- Audit Division
- Center for Information Technology, Communications and Information Protection (TsITSiZI)

=== Band of the Altai Krai Police ===
The police band of the Cultural Center of the Altai Krai Police was first organized in May 1999. At that time, members of the military band of the Barnaul Higher Military Aviation School of Pilots formed the basis of the ensemble. It was originally under the direction Captain Ivan Sursyakov. In 2002, the band toured the entire Altai Krai with a concert program dedicated to the 200th anniversary of the Russian MVD. In 2003, the band was attached to the Cultural Centre and has since 2007 been directed by Vladimir Lozin. In 2012, the band won the "Silver Tunes of Fanfares" festival of Russian law enforcement agencies in Seversk.
