= Military Band Service of the National Guard of Russia =

Official musical department of the National Guard of Russia

- Военный оркестр службы Национальной гвардии России
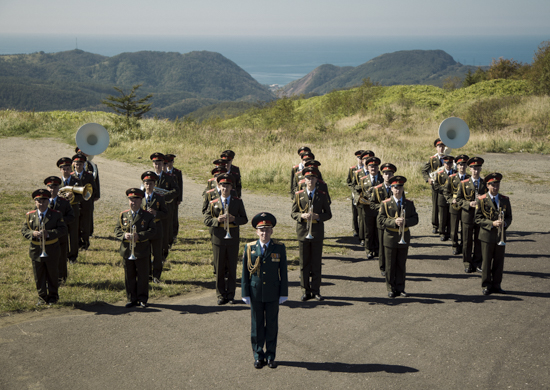
- The HQ Band of the Northwestern District Command in 2014
- Active: 1956 – present
- Country: Soviet Union; Russia
- Branch: National Guard of Russia
- Type: Military Band
- Garrison/HQ: Moscow
- Nickname: Rosgvardia Band

Commanders
- Head of the Band: Colonel Vladimir Vasyak

Military Band Service of the National Guard of Russia is the official musical department of the National Guard of Russia or the Rosgvardia. It has bands that perform commonly during many Russian national holidays such as Victory Day (9 May) on May 9 or Russia Day on June 12, as well as military holidays such as Defender of the Fatherland Day on February 23 and National Guardsmen's Day on March 27.

== History ==
The band service's principal band, the Exemplary Band of the National Guard (Russian: Образцово-показательный оркестр войск национальной гвардии Российской Федерации), was established as the Band of the Separate Operational Purpose Division of the Ministry of Internal Affairs of the Soviet Union on 6 December 1956. 15 years later, it was turned into a direct unit of the Soviet MVD's Internal Troops and was renamed the Exemplary Band of Internal Troops of the USSR. In 2016, following the creation of the National Guard of Russia the band service was renamed to the Military Band Service of the National Guard of Russia.

During the Soviet era, the band commonly performed in outside of the RSFSR, performing for the last time as a soviet band in the Uzbek SSR in 1989. The band took part in the 1980 Summer Olympics in Moscow, the Friendship Games and the 12th World Festival of Youth and Students in 1985. In its travels, it has performed with groups such as the Cyprus Youth Symphony Orchestra. The band notably took part in the Amur Waves International Military Bands Festival in Khabarovsk in 2018. The band most recently participated in a tour of China and Vietnam in November and December 2019 respectively.

== Composition ==
=== Ensembles of the Central Band ===
- Brass Band
- Symphony Orchestra
- Wind Band
- Big Band – The Big Band of the national guard usually performs popular Russian and foreign jazz music, as well as pop music. It usually works with artists like Malika Razakova and Olga Babayeva.

=== Bands of National Guard Forces Command ===
- Band of the Separate Operational Purpose Division (Dzerzhinsky Division)
- Band of the National Guard Naval Service Corps
- Band of the 46th Independent Operational Brigade of the North Caucasian District (Grozny)
- Military Band "North Star" (Kirov)
- Military Band of the Snezhinsky Regiment
- Military Band of the Zheleznogorsk Regiment
- Combined Military Band of the 55th Division of the Central District Command
- Military Band of the Krasnodar Region Chief Department

==== Bands of National Guard Directorates ====
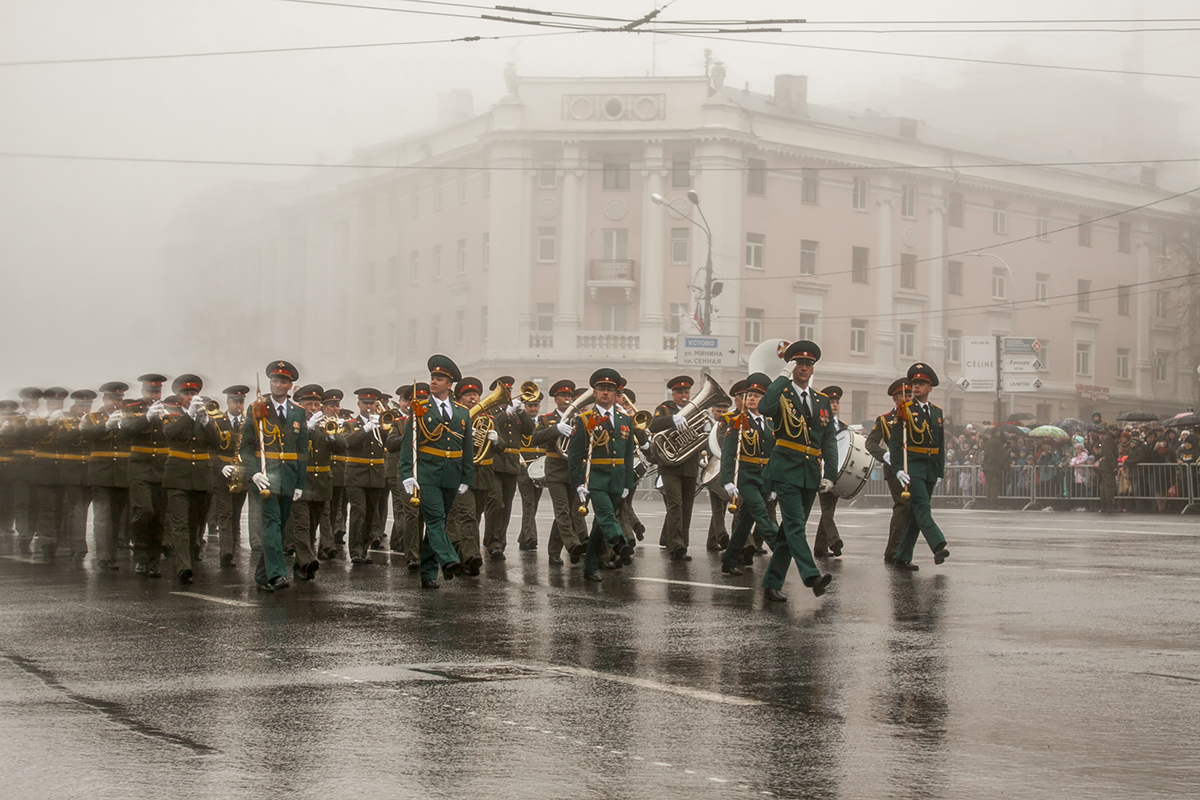
The military bands of the National Guard and the Nizhny Novgorod Garrison during a victory day parade on Minin and Pozharsky Square in 2017.

NGF regional commands are located in all major Russian cities. In all of these commands, there is a military band associated with the central band that serves its broader mission regionally. The following is a list of regional bands which are affiliated to the Central Band:

- HQ Band of the Northwestern District Command
- HQ Band of the Central District Command
- HQ Band of the North Caucasus District Command
- HQ Band of the Volga District Command
- HQ Band of the Ural District Command
- HQ Band of the Siberian District Command
- HQ Band of the Eastern District Command

=== Rosgvardiya educational institutions ===
- Band of the St. Petersburg National Guard Forces Command Military Institute
- Band of the Saratov Institute of the National Guard
- Band of the Perm Military Institute

== See also ==
- Military Band Service of the Armed Forces of Russia
- National Guard of Russia
- Military band
- National Guard
