= Military Band of the Central Military District =

Military band unit of the Russian Armed Forces

- Военный оркестр штаба Центрального военного округа
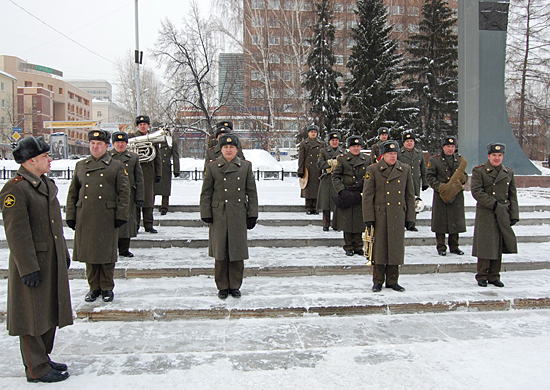
- Active: 1960 – present
- Country: Soviet Union; Russia
- Branch: Central Military District
- Type: Military Band
- Garrison/HQ: Yekaterinburg
- Nickname(s): "The Dancing Orchestra"

Commanders
- Director of Music: Major D. Anichkov

Military Band of the Central Military District is a military band unit of the Russian Armed Forces, based in Yekaterinburg. It is part of the Military Band Service of the Armed Forces of Russia as well as the Central Military District. It is one of the leading creative musical groups in the Urals, Volga Region and Western Siberia in terms of brass music. Especially famous are its musical numbers, accompanied by synchronous dance movements, for which the military musicians have been commonly nicknamed the "dancing orchestra."

== History ==
It was founded in November 1960 by Major Evgeny Matyushkin, who served as its first director and invested a lot of effort in the formation and popularization of the band. He later became a professor at the Urals Mussorgsky State Conservatoire and was conferred the title of Honoured Cultural Worker of the RSFSR. Notable soloists that have performed with the band have included: Svetlana Komaricheva, Yury Yakovlev, Yuri Devin, and Sergei Belov. On 3 March 2011, the band celebrated its golden jubilee in the local House of Officers. The band has participated in festivals in Budapest, Almaty, Tyumen, Surgut, and Khabarovsk. In 2011, the band took part in the 20th International Brass Band Festival in Chiayi (Taiwan) and the WASBE World Congress. It regularly takes part in Russian national events such as Victory Day and Defender of the Fatherland Day. It has also taken part in Russian Orthodox prayer processions from the City's Holy Trinity Cathedral.
