= 1976 October Revolution Parade =

Parade in the Union of Soviet Socialist Republics

The 1976 October Revolution Parade was a parade on Moscow's Red Square on November 7, 1976, dedicated to the 59th anniversary of the October Revolution. The parade marked the last appearance of Politburo member Nikolai Podgorny. Newly appointed Soviet Defense Minister Dmitry Ustinov greeted armed battalions while the parade was commanded by Moscow Military District, Colonel General Vladimir Govorov. Nikolay Mikhaylov conducted the Combined Orchestra of the Moscow Garrison which provided the music for the parade. General Secretary of the Communist Party of the Soviet Union Leonid Brezhnev and other high-ranking officials within the Communist Party of the Soviet Union spectated the parade from the grandstand of Lenin's Mausoleum. Although military vehicles were present, there was no display of tanks.

== See also ==
- October Revolution
