= Viktor Afanasyev =

Viktor Afanasyev may refer to:

- Viktor Afanasyev (cosmonaut) (born 1948), Russian cosmonaut
- Viktor Afanasyev (politician) (1922–1994), Soviet politician and editor
- Viktor Afanasyev (military musician) (1947–2020), Soviet and Russian military conductor
