= Valery Khalilov =

Uzbek-Russian military band conductor and composer (1952–2016)

- Валерий Михайлович Халилов
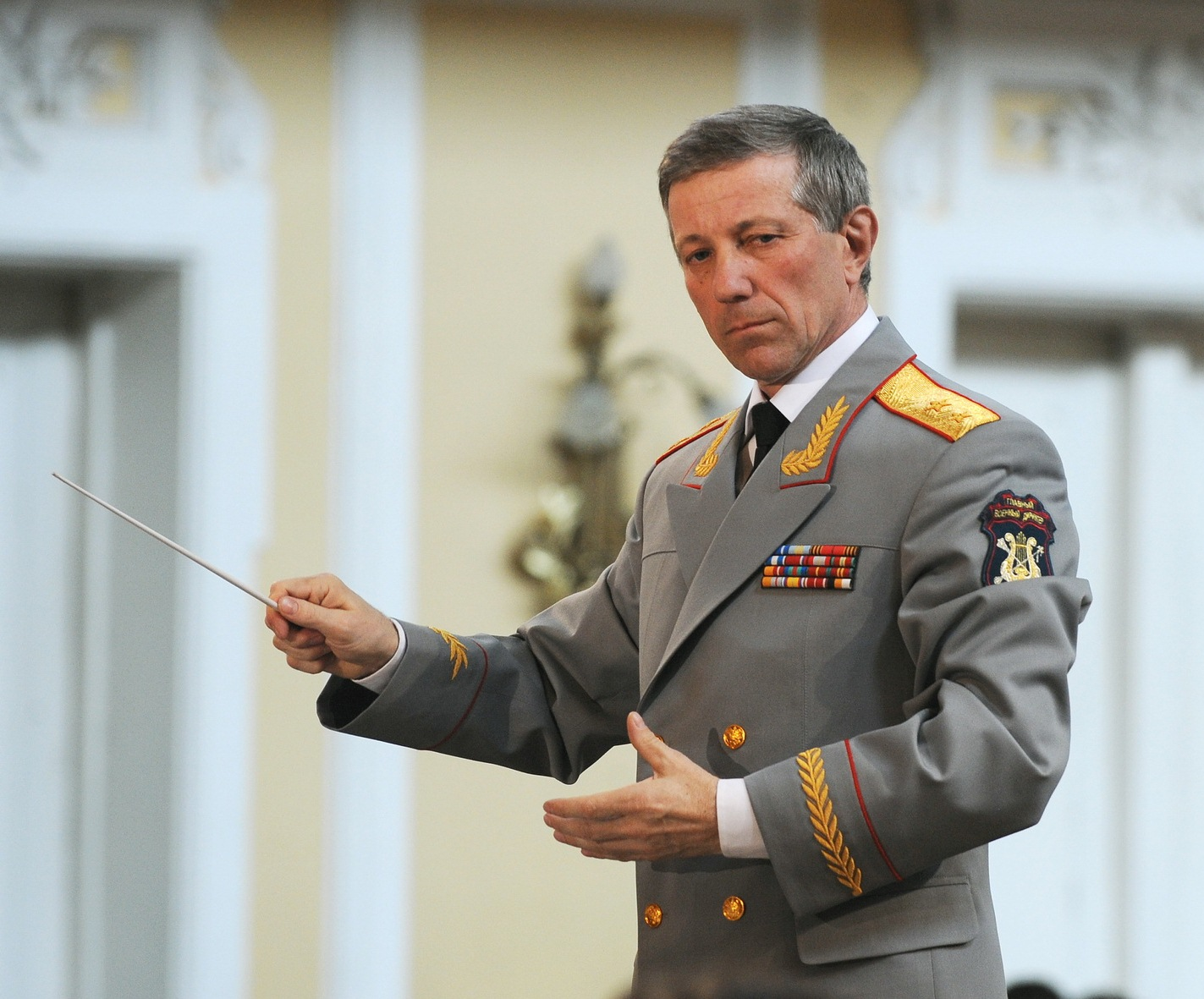
- Khalilov in 2010
- Born: Valery Mikhailovich Khalilov; 30 January 1952; Termez, Uzbek SSR, Soviet Union
- Died: 25 December 2016 (aged 64); Sochi, Russia
- Cause of death: Plane crash
- Burial place: Kirzhach, Russia
- Alma mater: Moscow Military Music College
- Spouse: Natalia Khalilova
- Military career
- Allegiance: USSR; Russia
- Branch: Russian Ground Forces
- Service years: 1970-2016
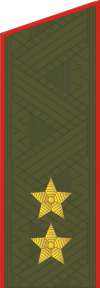
- Rank: Lieutenant General
- Commands: Military Band Service of the Armed Forces of Russia
- Awards: People's Artist of Russia

Valery Mikhailovich Khalilov (Russian: Валерий Михайлович Халилов; 30 January 1952 – 25 December 2016) was an Uzbek-born Russian military band conductor and composer. A lieutenant general in the Russian military, he was the Senior Director of Music of the Military Band Service of the Armed Forces of Russia and Chief Military Conductor, most famously conducting the massed Russian military bands at the annual "Victory Day" parade held in the Moscow's Red Square a record 14 times. He died when the plane he was on, en route to Syria, crashed into the Black Sea off Sochi, Russia.

== Early life and education ==
Khalilov was born on 30 January 1952 into a family famous for producing military conductors in the city of Termez, located in what is now Uzbekistan. His mother Klavdiya Vasilievna Vinogradova and father Mikhail Nikolayevich Khalilov was a career officer serving as a military conductor in the Soviet Border Troops. He later on was accepted into the Moscow Military Music College where he studied and played the clarinet among many other instruments, he often described it as a hard environment and that he missed home, he graduated at the age of 23. From 1970 to 1975 he was on the conducting faculty of the Moscow State Tchaikovsky Conservatory (class of Professor GP Alyavdin).

== Career ==
Khalilov's first posting was being a conductor at the Pushkin Higher School of Radioelectronics of Air Defense under the Soviet Air Defence Forces, before being a teacher at the Moscow military conductor's faculty in 1981. As conductor of the Pushkin Higher School military band he won first place in the competition of military bands of the Leningrad Military District in 1980 and gained the attention of the chief conductor of the Moscow Military District Military Band, Major General Nikolai Mikhailov, who brought him into that band as deputy conductor in 1984. He subsequently transferred to the governing body of the Military Band Service of the Armed Forces of the USSR that same year, marking his first national television appearance at that year's Revolution Day Parade and at the Victory Day Parade the following year as one of the deputy directors leading the massed bands that year, under his superior officer Major General Mikhalilov.

Khalilov rose through the ranks and eventually became the chief conductor and Senior Director of Music of the Military Band Service of the Armed Forces of Russia in 2002, with his first national TV appearance as chief conductor of the combined band in the 2003 Victory Day Parade. In May 2015, Khalilov became a member of the Board of Trustees' Academy festive culture. He served as chief conductor of the Moscow area massed military bands and emeritus director of music and conductor for the Central Military Band of the Ministry of Defense for a record 14 years.

In that capacity, Khalilov organised many festive theatrical events in Moscow which were attended by Russian military bands and groups from many countries. Events included international military tattoos "The Kremlin Zorya", and "Spasskaya Tower". He toured with the leading bands of the Russian Armed Forces in Austria, Sweden, United States, Germany, Hungary, North Korea, Mongolia, Poland, Finland, France, Switzerland, and Belgium.

== Later life and death ==
In April 2016, Khalilov became the artistic director of the Alexandrov Ensemble, known worldwide as the Red Army Choir. Khalilov retired from the Moscow Garrison Orchestra on 22 August 2016, and conducted Russian civil war song White Army, Black Baron on the Red Square as his last major performance with the massed bands. He was replaced by Colonel Timofey Mayakin, a Merited Artist of Russia, in his role as Senior Director of Music of the Military Band Service.

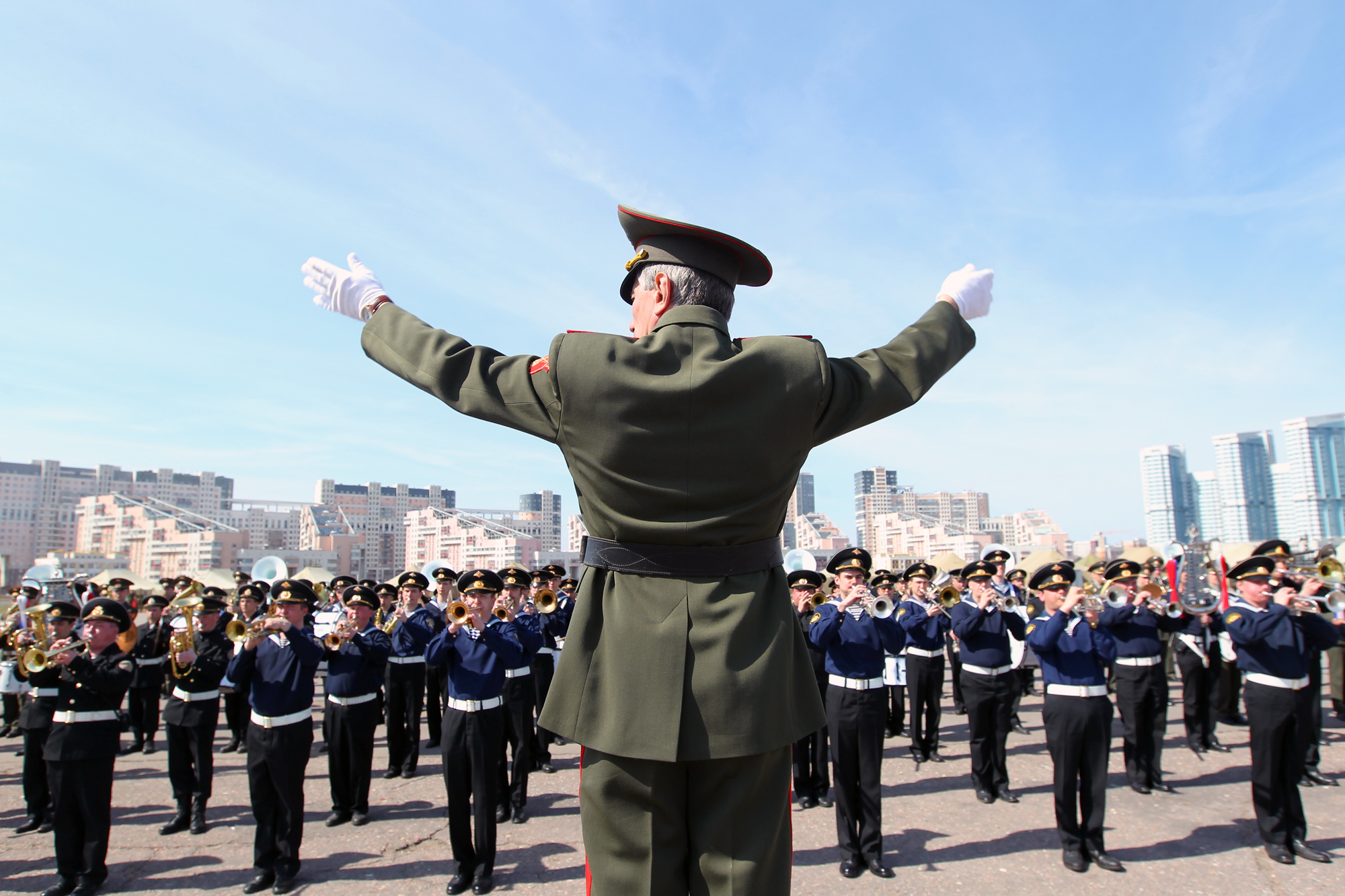
Khaliliov repetition 2011

Khalilov toured the Hugh Hodgson School of Music of the University of Georgia in November 2016, where he gave musical instruction to the students, performed with the UGA Symphony Orchestra and Hodgson Wind Ensemble. He also attended a Georgia-Auburn football game with directory George Foreman, where he, according to Foreman, started composing a new march called "The Redcoat March", in honor of the Georgia Redcoat Marching Band.

Khalilov died in the crash of the RA-85572 Tupolev TU-154 plane that went down in the Black Sea off Sochi on 25 December 2016 with the choir and dance arm of the ensemble, scheduled to perform for Russian troops stationed in Syria as part of New Year celebrations. The crash was believed to have been caused by a problem with the plane's flaps though recently reports suggest pilot disorientation was the cause. At a makeshift memorial set up for him, hundreds of mourners left flowers and candles.

Khalilov was buried on 16 January 2017 at the Tracts the Archangelsk churchyard of the Kirzhachskiy district, Vladimir region. He was given a military funeral that was attended by many of his past and former colleagues and students, and eulogies were given by many including his successor as senior director of music, Colonel Mayakin. The Nowinki Village in that district, which is located near the Khmelevo and the Archangel churchyard, is the birthplace of the ancestors of Khalilov. This village was his childhood home and Khalilov carried his love for Nowinki and its picturesque surroundings throughout his life and as such, he was buried here instead of in Moscow. He last spent time in this village on 11 December 2016, two weeks before his death.

Prior to his death, Khalilov was still actively writing music for various occasions including a piece for a Russian film.

== Legacy ==
Khalilov was an accomplished musician and conductor, able to play many types of musical instruments, including the piano, with proficiency, and to conduct both choirs and bands. He conducted the thousand-strong massed military bands during Victory Day parades including the band's closing performance for the parade. Notably, he conducted the massed bands during the 60th, 65th and 70th Victory Day parades. These performances were of greater length than normal and the endings were somewhat unusual.

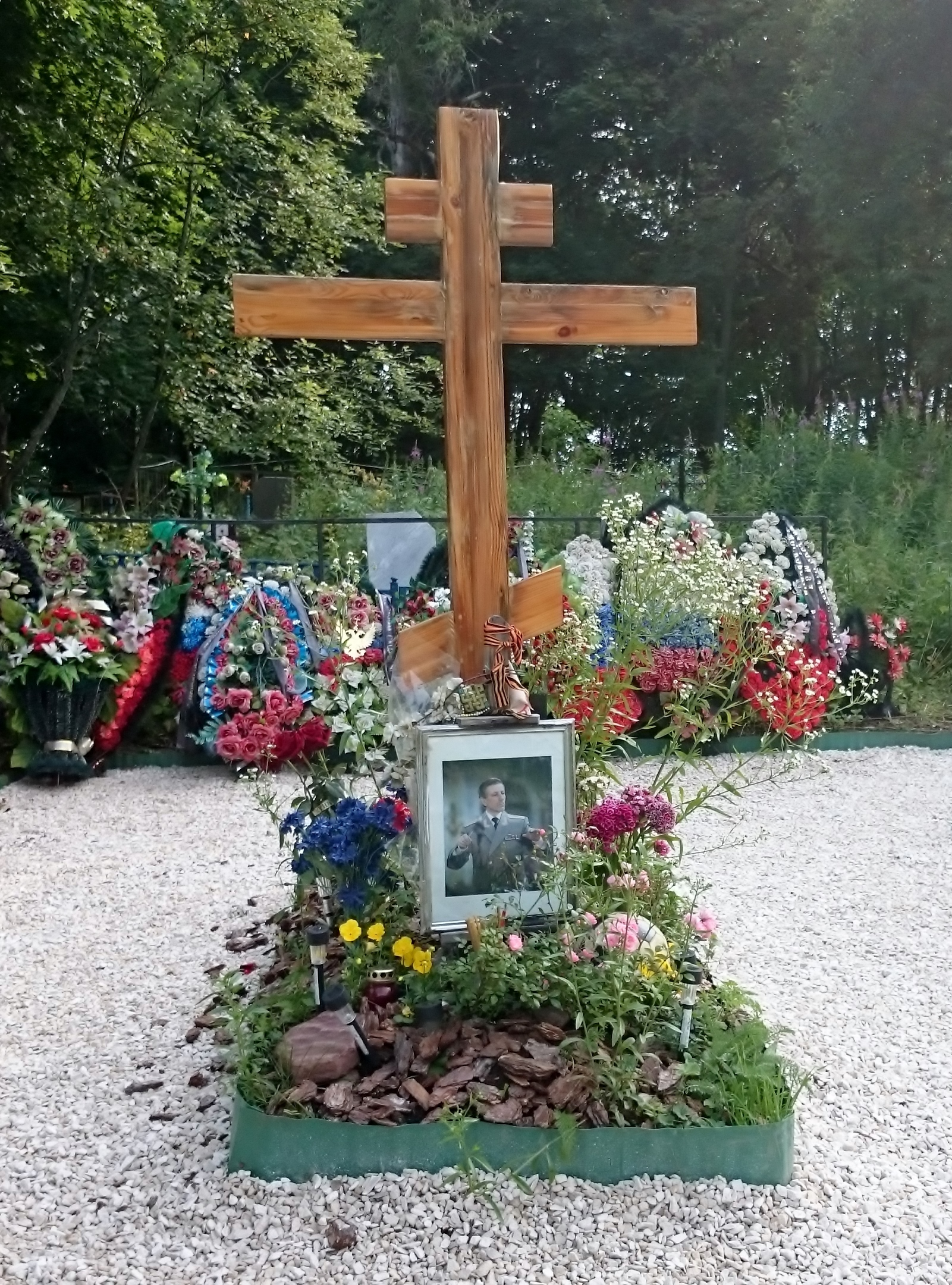
General Khalilov's gravesite

Khalilov was the last of the great conductors educated in Soviet times. After the fall of the Soviet Union, the band, along with the rest of the army, was in disarray. When he was appointed conductor of the Massed Bands of the Moscow Garrison, he worked hard to reorganize and rebuild it, to the point that it had a more prominent feature than before in the Victory Day parades. In 2003 the band fielded less than 400 musicians for the Victory Day parade but by the 2016 Victory Day parade, the massed bands had more than a thousand musicians led by more than 20 deputy directors, with 12 drum majors and 2 senior drum majors (for a total of 16, plus another 12 at the rear). In the 2010 Victory Day parade, Khalilov successfully conducted a huge combined band consisting of both Russian and foreign military bands. During the Spasskaya Tower Military Music Festival and Tattoo, Khalilov would sometimes conduct all the participants as they played the final song during the closing ceremony.

Khalilov described the effect these bands have in the following 2005 interview with the Los Angeles Times:

"Military music is incredibly important for Russians, because military music is a component of the Russian army, and the army has always played a crucially important role in protecting Russia’s great statehood and in making it a powerful nation."

Khalilov was also an accomplished music composer apart from being a military conductor, and wrote many pieces for the brass band including "Adagio", "Kant", "Afghan", "Elegy", marches such as "Cadet", "Youth", "Rynda", "Ulan", his most famous being " General Miloradovich ", as well as romances and songs. He composed many new military marches and songs, some of which he used in the Victory Day parades he conducted. It was announced on the third anniversary of his death in 2019 that a military tattoo titled the Valery Khalilov International Music Festival would take place between 29 January and 2 February 2020, specifically timed to honour Khalilov's birthday on 30 January.

The University of Georgia Hodgson Wind Ensemble honored Khalilov shortly after his death by performing one of his pieces, March Bodrii, with an empty podium to represent the empty space he left in the world of music. He died less than two months after conducting and touring with the band.

== Awards ==
In his career, he earned many awards including the Order of Honor, Order "For Service to the Homeland in the Armed Forces of the USSR" 3rd Class, the Medal for Military Merit 1st Class, and the titles of Honoured People's Artist of Russia and Honoured Art Worker of Russia. In his lifetime, he had conducted many interviews and appeared in programmes about Russian military bands, making him relatively popular and well known among the public for a military conductor. The Moscow Military Music College was renamed the Moscow Military Music College Lieutenant-General VM Khalilov. Valery Khalilov Square in Kirzhach is named after him in his memory and according to a Russian news commentary, the square "is a lovely park - the same age as the deceased conductor". Social activists of the city have also decided to establish a festival of brass bands in memory of Khalilov, which is to be held in the newly opened Alexander Garden. The first festival is planned for July 2017 and the park has been described as "a beautiful place and a suitable place."

One of the streets in the city was renamed after him and officials renamed the various places and institutions by 30 January, Khalilov's birthday.

Political offices
Preceded by Viktor Afanasyev	Senior Director of Music of the Military Band Service of the Armed Forces; 2002 – 2016	Succeeded by Timofey Mayakin
