= Moscow National Guard Presidential Cadets School =

- Московское президентское кадетское училище
- Motto: Долг. Честь. Отечество. Польза
- Motto in English: Duty. Honor. Fatherland. Benefit
- Established: September 8, 2002
- Director: Dmitry Kovalenko
- Students: 378
- Location: 55.696889°N 37.757500°E
- Language: Russian

The Moscow National Guard Presidential Cadets School named after Mikhail Sholokhov (Note: Russian: Московское президентское кадетское училище имени М. А. Шолохова войск национальной гвардии Российской Федерации, romanized: Moskovskoye prezidentskoye kadetskoye uchilishche imeni M. A. Sholokhova voysk natsionalnoy gvardii Rossiyskoy Federatsii) is a pre-university specialized educational institution of secondary education of the National Guard of Russia (Rosgvuardia). It is a Cossack, sponsored school, with Cossack traditions often being implemented. It is located on Marshal Chuykov Street in the Kuzminki District of the South-Eastern Administrative Okrug. The current director of the school is Colonel Nikolai Perepecha.

== History ==
The idea of opening a Cossack cadet corps in Southwestern Moscow cane from Vladimir Borisovich Zotov. Support and assistance for the creation of the school was provided by Deputy of the State Duma and Supreme Ataman of the Union of Cossacks Alexander Martynov. It was originally opened on 2 September 2002. It was founded by the Moscow Department of Education. On 5 March 2004, by order of the Government of Moscow, it was given the honorific of Mikhail Sholokhov, honoring the novelist's work in writing about the lives of Don Cossacks during the Russian Revolution and the Russian Civil War. To help create a basis for the future military leadership of this branch, the school was subordinated to the Rosgvardia on 1 January 2016, acting as the equivalent to the Suvorov Military School in the Ministry of Defense of Russia.

== Activities ==
The cadet corps of the school consists of 370 pupils, divided into fifteen study groups, whose overall term of study is seven years. In 2007, two museums were opened in the cadet corps: a room-museum in honor of Mikhail Sholokhov and a museum on the history of the Cossacks. In addition to the traditional school curriculum, students also learn combat training, horseback riding, shooting, and Cossack traditions. Its first major national appearance was at the 2018 Moscow Victory Day Parade on Red Square. It marched with the military banner that was awarded to the school earlier that year on 28 February. Members of the school have participated in the Immortal Regiment march.

== Building ==
The building consists of two four-story dormitories with 380 beds for cadets. It also hosts a four-story educational building, and a four-story cultural and health building, which houses a ballroom and a dining room that can seat 380 people as well as a 400-seat assembly. There are two parade grounds, sports towns, as well as a walk fame of Russian military leaders, graduates and Russian government officials. There is a Russian Orthodox Church located near the building.

== Directors ==
The following is a list of directors of the school:

- Colonel A. Voloboev (2002–2003)
- Colonel Mikhail Shpinkov (2003–2012)
- Lieutenant General Vladimir Chaynikov (2012–2013)
- Colonel V. Chernov (May–July 2013)
- Colonel Nikolay Perepecha (since July 2013)
