= Military Band Service of the Armed Forces of Russia =

Music organization in the Russian military

Military Band Service of the Armed Forces of the Russian Federation
- Военно-оркестровая служба Вооружённых Сил Российской Федерации
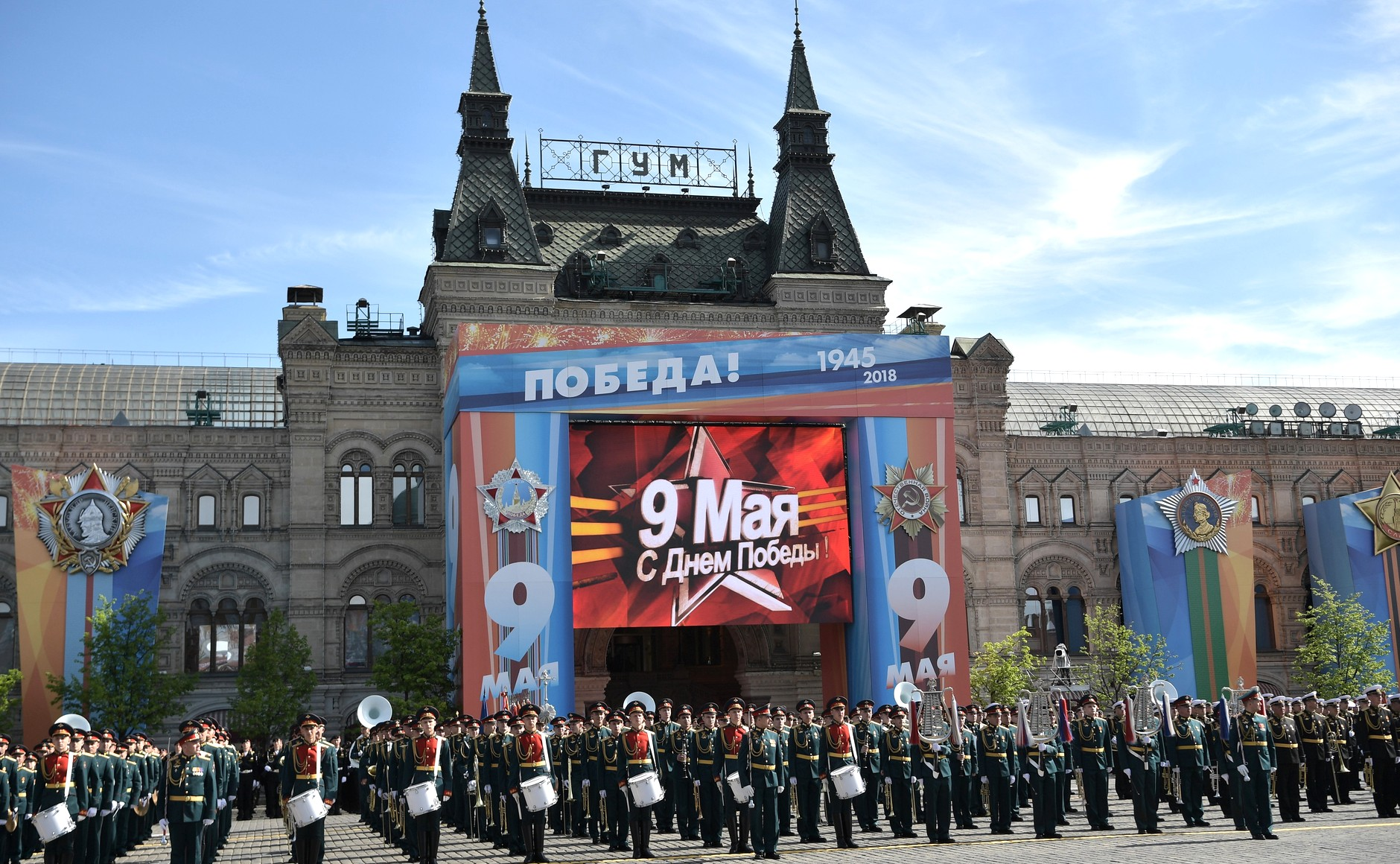
- The massed bands of the Moscow Garrison during the 2018 Moscow Victory Day Parade.
- Active: 1711; 315 years ago
- Country: Russia
- Branch: Ministry of Defense
- Type: Administrative service
- Role: The organization of military bands belonging to the Russian Armed Forces
- Size: 1000+ musicians divided between 200-300 bands
- Part of: Military Band Service Directorate
- Headquarters: Moscow
- Anniversaries: February 19 (Day of the Band Service)

Commanders
- Senior Director of Music of the Armed Forces: Major General Timofey Mayakin
- Chief Inspector: Lieutenant Colonel Igor Shevernev
- Notable commanders: Major General Semyon Tchernetsky (1924–1949); Major General Nikolai Mikhailov (1976–1993); Lieutenant General Valery Khalilov (2002–2016)

Insignia
- Emblem (1991-Present)

The Military Band Service of the Armed Forces of the Russian Federation serves as the official service of military bands in active service within the Russian Armed Forces and formerly the Soviet Armed Forces. It is part of the Military Band Service Directorate of the General Staff of the Armed Forces of the Russian Federation.

== Senior Directors ==
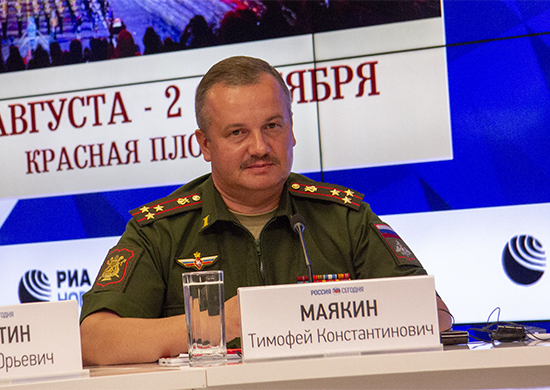
Timofey Mayakin

- Major General Semyon Tchernetsky (1924–1949)
- Major General Ivan Petrov (1950–1958)
- Major General Nikolai Nazarov (1958–1976)
- Major General Nikolai Mikhailov (1976–1993)
- Lieutenant General Viktor Afanasyev (1993–2002)
- Lieutenant General Valery Khalilov (2002–2016)
- Major General Timofey Mayakin (2016–Present)

== History ==
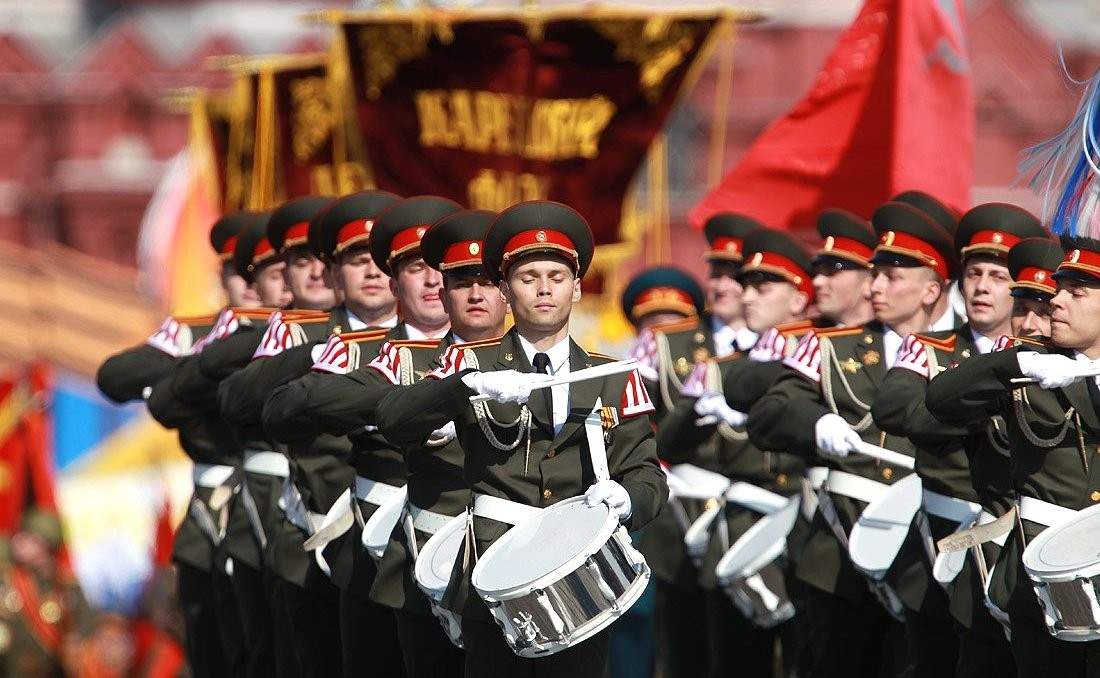
Drummers of the band service during the 2010 Moscow Victory Day Parade.

For a country that has not just one of the largest armed forces in the world but also has produced some of the greatest composers and musicians, the MBS-AFR is one of the oldest institutions of military music in Europe and the world, founded by Peter the Great as per Ukaz № 2319 enacted on Feb. 19, 1711, which mandated the formation of military bands and field music formations within both the Imperial Russian Army and the nascent Imperial Russian Navy following the Western practices. As both the Army's two foundation regiments (the Preobrazhensky Regiment and the Semyonovsky Regiment) had their own bands and corps of drums, which would also inspire the formation of the bands and fanfare band units within the artillery and the cavalry, the age of Peter the Great, aside from laying the foundation of the armed forces, also began centuries of the Russian military band tradition, which continues until today. In the 1870s, a post called the Inspector of Naval Bands, held by composer Nikolai Rimsky-Korsakov until its abolishment, became the starting point for the official organized arrangement of military bands. In 1922, the Inspectorate of the Military Bands of the Red Army and Navy was formed, renamed in 1955 as the current Military Band Service. In October 1924, the post of Inspector of Military Bands of the Red Army. As of 1947, Inspectorate of Military Bands reported directly to the head of the 3rd Division of the Combat Training Department of the Soviet Army Headquarters, where it was transferred to on 1 December 1931. Its modern functions and duties were established in an order signed by the Chief of the General Staff Viktor Samsonov on 22 November 1996. In November 2007, by the approval of President Dmitry Medvedev, the band service created a charter for the conductors of garrison bands to have more authority over their events and activities. In 2011, the service celebrated 300 years of Russian military music.

== Activities ==
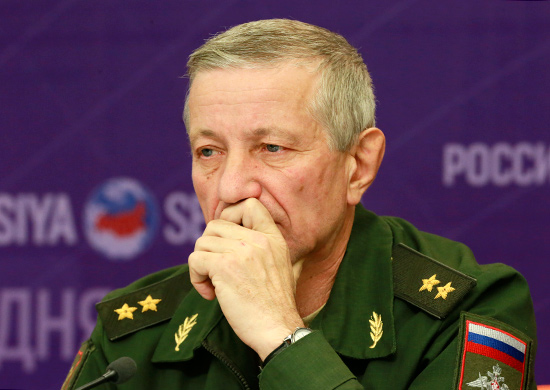
Valery Khalilov in June 2016. Khalilov was regarded positively due to his successful efforts reorganize and rebuild the military band service in the early 2000s.

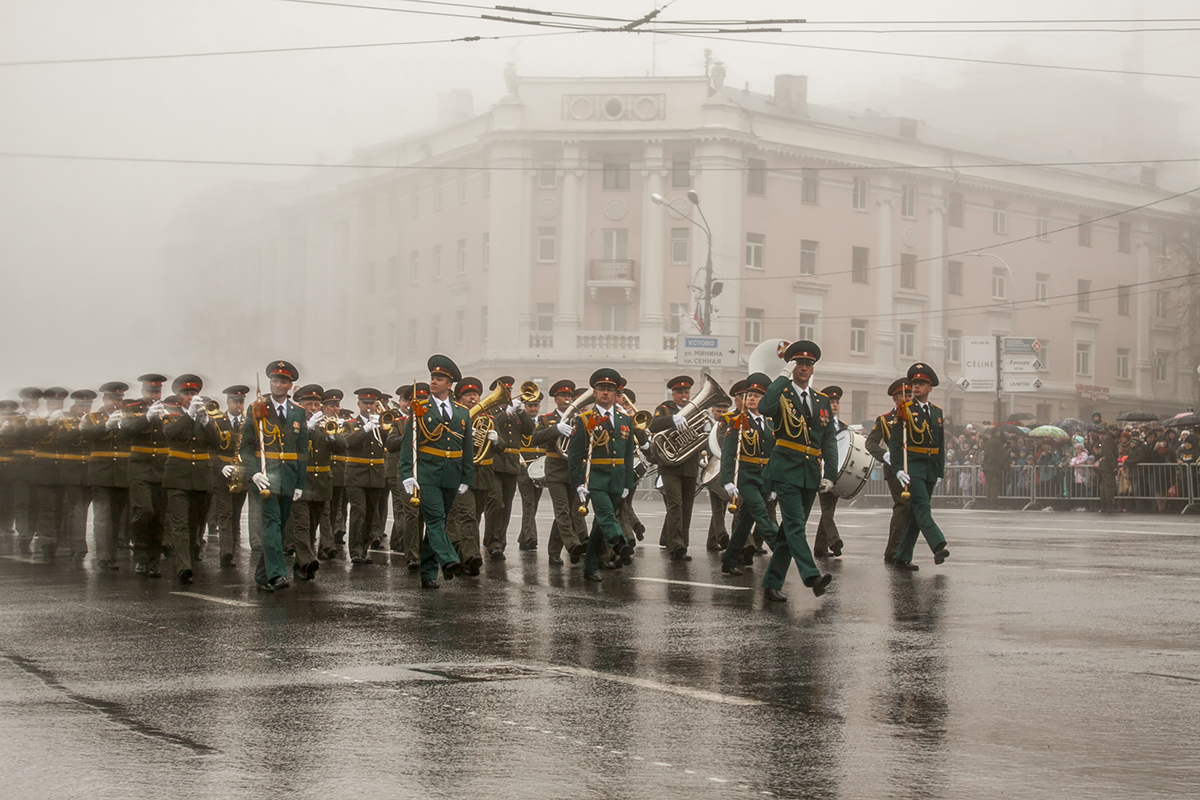
Massed Bands of the Nizhny Novgorod Garrison during a victory day parade in 2017.

Annual concert activity of the military band service began inside the hall of the Philharmonic Society of St. Petersburg in November 1813.

=== Senior Director of Music and regional directors ===
The office of Senior Director of Music of the Military Band Service is the operational and administrative leader of the service. His/her role is laid out in a decree from Soviet Defence Minister Rodion Malinovsky dating back to July 1963. Local military bands of military garrisons and units are managed by the chiefs of the military bands services of the military districts, with their appointment being as the Senior Director of Music. As such, local conductors report to the director and are accountable to him/her only.

=== Mass service-wide events ===
Over 1,000 musicians of the service divided into 40 bands participate in the annual Victory Day parades and before 1991 the October Revolution and May 1 parades as well. The service is an active sponsor of the annual Spasskaya Tower Military Music Festival and Tattoo in Moscow. Joint military concerts are commonly held between the bands of the service and foreign military bands on Russian and foreign soil. Mass events were held on the service's tricentennial in 2011. Every couple of years, officials from the service conduct contests to identify the best bands in the service as well as inspections to identify those that retain the standard for bands. In 1928, the first national competition of military bands being held.

=== Individual bands ===
The military band service provides military bands for the Kremlin Regiment and the 154th Preobrazhensky Independent Commandant's Regiment during special occasions and state visit.

== Composition ==
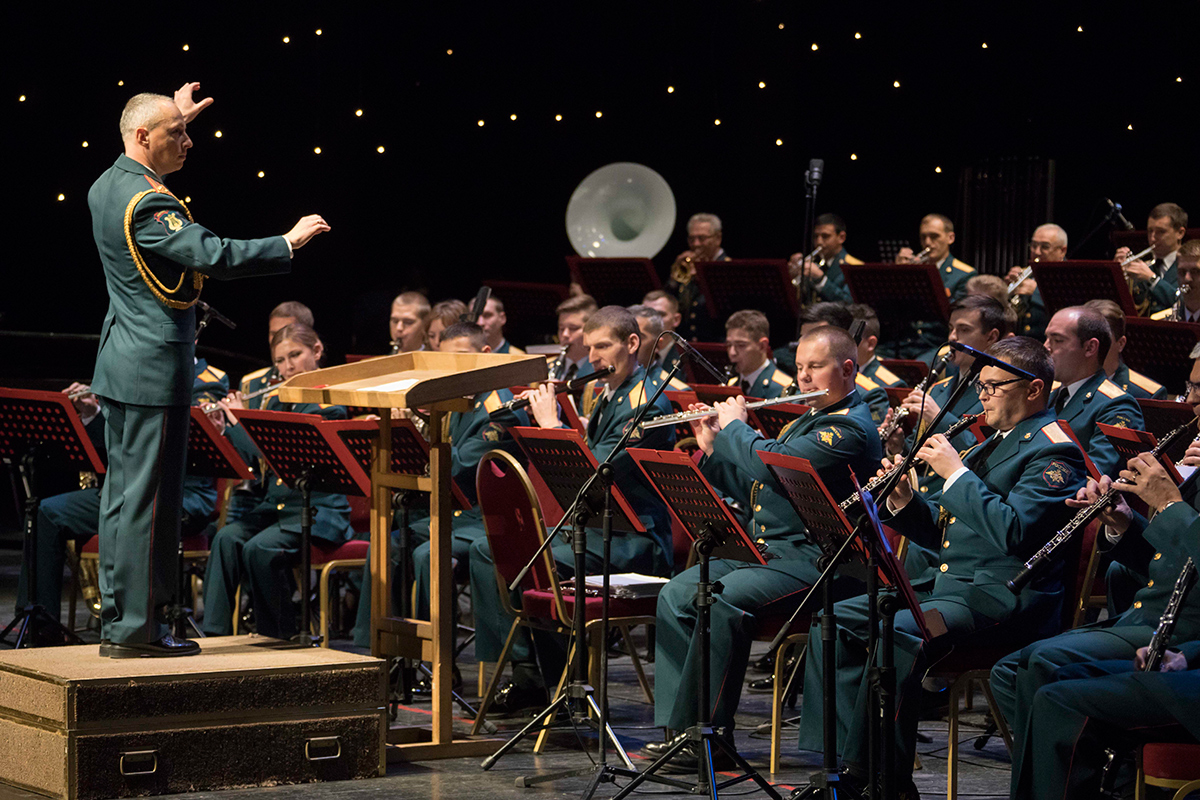
The band under the direction of Colonel Sergey Durygin during its 90th anniversary concert in 2017.

The composition of the Military Band Service of the Armed Forces of the Russian Federation include:

- General Office of the Military Band Service of the Russian Defense Ministry
- Exemplary Bands (bands that have specific duties and representative activities that therefore make them the seniormost in the armed forces)
  - Central Military Band of the Ministry of Defense of Russia
  - Central Navy Band of Russia
  - Exemplary Military Band (Honor Guard)
- Training Schools
  - Institute of Military Band Conductors of the Military University (formerly the Military Bandmaster department of the Moscow State Tchaikovsky Conservatory)
  - Moscow Suvorov Military Music College Lieutenant-General VM Khalilov
- Regional Bands
  - Headquarters bands of military districts
  - Unit bands
  - Bands of groups of forces and separate armies
  - Bands of naval fleets and marine bases
- Bands within military units and formations and in military schools

Not under the armed forces but affiliated to the Band Service:

- Presidential Band of the Russian Federation – under the Kremlin Regiment of the Federal Protective Service
- Military Band Service of the National Guard of Russia
- Military Band Service of the Ministry of Emergency Situations of Russia
- Central Band of the Border Guard Service of the Federal Security Service of Russia
- Police Band Service of the Ministry of Internal Affairs of Russia

The Band of the Moscow Garrison is in that it consists of the 190 quality musicians who come together from different exemplary bands throughout the former Moscow Military District. At one time, it included the Headquarter Band of the MVO, the Combined Band of the Internal Troops, the Band of the Military Institute of Military Conductors, the Band of the Military Academy of the Strategic Rocket Forces, the Band of the Moscow Higher Military Command School, and the Band of the 147 Automobile Base of the Ministry of Defense. The support all important state events and special events in the Russian capital, including military parades on Red Square and international music festivals.

== Current Formation of Massed Bands ==
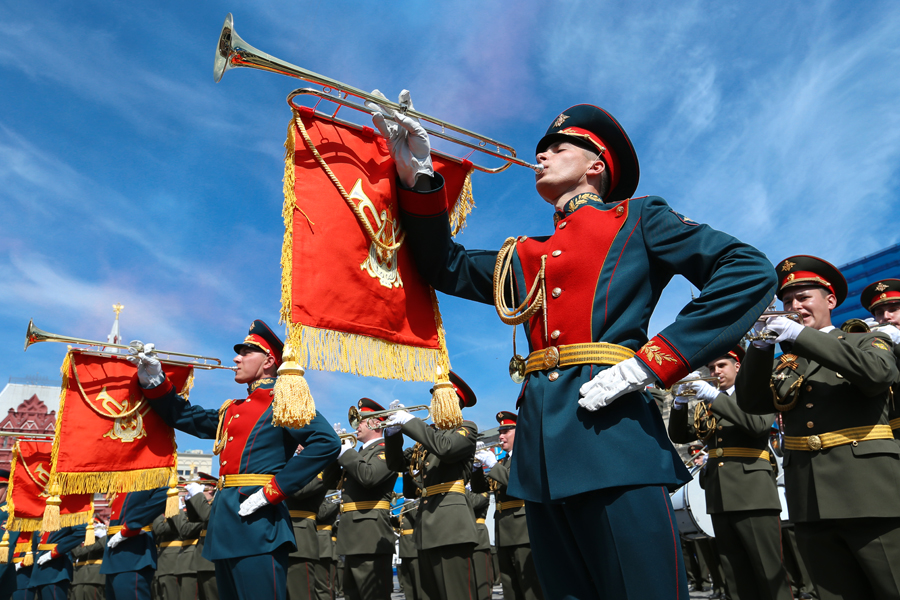
A chromatic fanfare trumpeter of the 3rd Battalion, 154th Preobrazhensky Independent Commandant's Regiment participating in a parade on Red Square.

Formation in Moscow

- Chromatic Fanfare Trumpets, Field Drums, 1st Glockenspiels
- Trumpets, Cornets, Flugelhorns
- 1st Trombones
- 1st and 2nd Marching Percussion
  - Snare drums
  - Bass drums and Cymbals
  - Turkish crescents
  - 2nd Glockenspiels
- 2nd Trombones
- Horns, Mellophones
- Clarinets, Oboes, Saxophones, Bassoons, Flutes and Piccolos
- Baritone horns, Tenor horns, Saxhorns
- Euphoniums, Wagner Tubas, Tubas, Sousaphones

Formation in St Petersburg

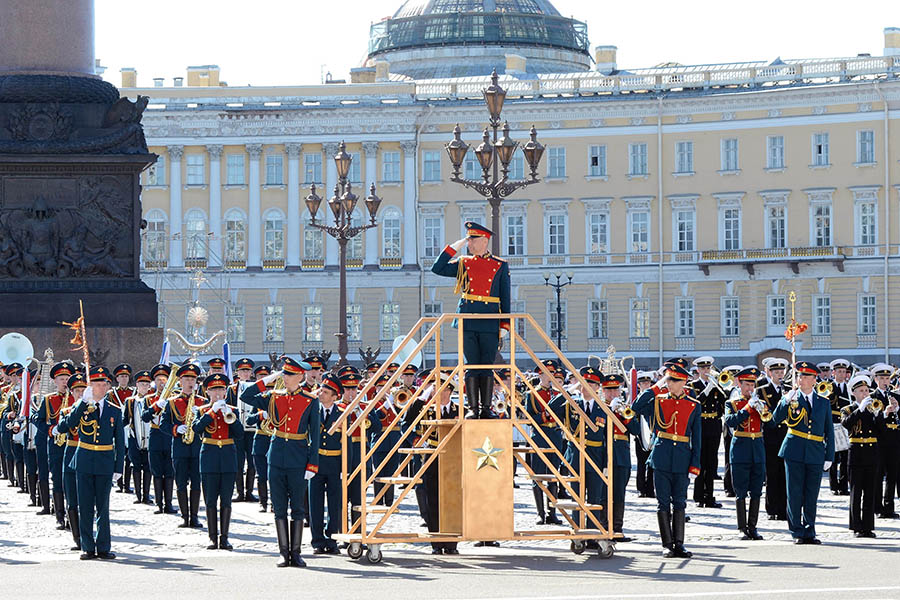
The band of the St. Petersburg Garrison.

- Chromatic Fanfare Trumpets (optional)
- Field Drums (optional)
- Trumpets
- 1st Trombones, Horns and Woodwinds
  - Clarinets, Saxophones
- Marching Percussion
  - Snare Drums
  - Bass drums
  - Cymbals
  - Turkish crescent (since 2011)
  - Glockenspiels
- 2nd Trombones and Horns
- 2nd Woodwinds
  - Clarinets, Oboes, Bassoons, Flutes, Piccolos
  - Saxophones
- Saxhorns, Baritone and tenor horns, Euphoniums, Wagner tubas
- Tubas, Sousaphones (optional)

Formation in Yekaterinburg

- Chromatic Fanfare Trumpets
- Field Drums (optional)
- Trumpets, Cornets
- Trombones and Horns
- Saxophones
- Clarinets, Oboes, Bassoons, Flutes, Piccolos
- Marching Percussion
  - Snare Drums
  - Bass drums
  - Cymbals
  - Turkish crescent
  - Glockenspiels
- Saxhorns, Baritone and tenor horns, Euphoniums, Wagner tubas
- Tubas, Sousaphones (optional)

== Symbols ==
Emblem

Variant Emblem

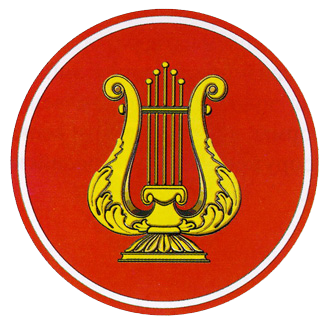
Shoulder patch

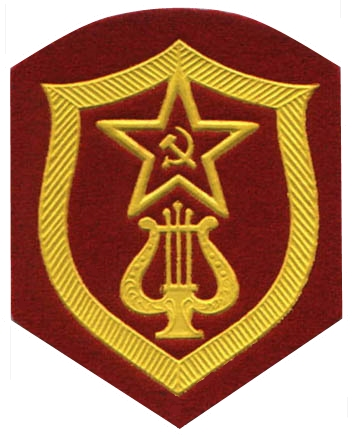
Shoulder Patch (1960-1991)

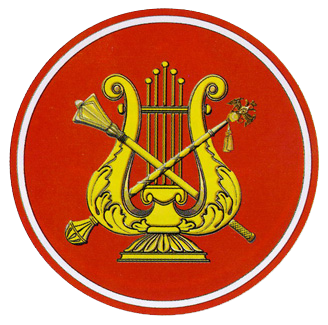
Patch for Organs of the Military Band Service Directorate

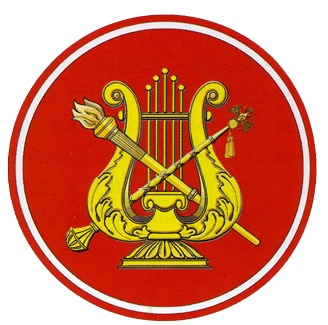
Patch of the Moscow Military Conservatory

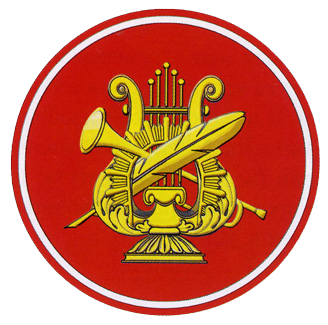
Patch of the Moscow Military Music College

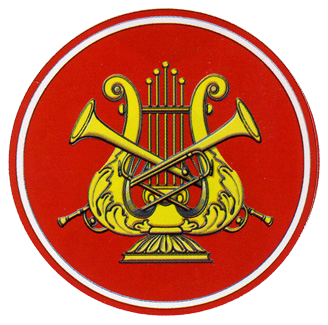
Patch of the Band of the Ministry of Defence

The emblems and patches of the band service were adopted by order of Defence Minister Sergei Ivanov on 7 February 2005.

Common elements of military band symbols include:

- Lyre (traditional emblem of military musicians worldwide)
- Red color (traditional color of the instrument cloth of military personnel in military bands)
- Emblem of the Russian Armed Forces
- Oak wreath

== See also ==
- Russian military bands
- Music Branch (Canadian Forces)
- Royal Corps of Army Music
- Military Music Center of the Bundeswehr
- Australian Army Band Corps
- Military Band Service (Kazakhstan)
- Swedish Armed Forces Music Corps
