= Moscow Military Music College =

Military music college in Russia

- Московское военно-музыкальное училище
- Academy coat of arms
- Other names: MsVMU (МсВМУ)
- Former names: Moscow Red Army School of Music
- Motto: "Life for the Fatherland is an honor to anyone"
- Type: military academy
- Established: August 1, 1937
- Founders: Semyon Tchernetsky
- Parent institution: Military Band Service of the Armed Forces of Russia
- Affiliations: Moscow Suvorov Military School
- Director: Colonel Alexander Gerasimov
- Students: 200
- Location: Zavoda Mosrentgen, Moscow, Moscow Region, Russia
- Language: Russian
- Website: MVMU

The Valery Khalilov Moscow Suvorov Military Music College is a military music institution in Russia. It is a branch of the Suvorov Military Schools in Russia, and the oldest of them all (opened 1937).

== History ==
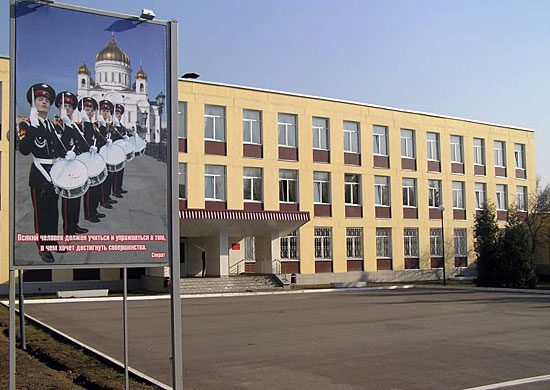
The entrance to the building

On August 1, 1937, the conductor and director of music of the Central Military Band of the People's Commissariat of National Defense Major General Semyon Cherneysky founded the college, which was built as a boarding school for potential military musicians in the Red Army.

In 1944, as an acknowledgement of the service of its alumni, affiliation to the then young Suvorov Military School's Moscow campus was announced, with the corresponding privilege to wear its iconic black and red full dress on parades, which continues to this day.

== Traditions ==
Shortly before its 80th anniversary the "Valery Khalilov" honorific title was bestowed on the college on December 26, 2016, by Ministry of Defence General of the Army Sergey Shoygu - a day after the aircrash that killed Valery Khalilov and 91 others off Sochi while the Alexandrov Ensemble was on its way to perform for Russian troops deployed in Syria.

== Special units ==
=== Band ===
The school maintains a Marching Band (Russian: Марширующий оркестр) that is employed in ceremonial events hosted by the college, mostly made up of the musicians of the training band wing. The Suvorov College Band performs at the country's leading venues, including the Great Hall of the Moscow Conservatory, the Moscow International House of Music, and the State Kremlin Palace. The central training band wing of the college plays not only in Russia, but also in military tattoo events in Switzerland, Germany, France, Italy, England, Poland, and the Czech Republic. It has been a regular participant in the Spasskaya Tower military tattoo festival since 2006.

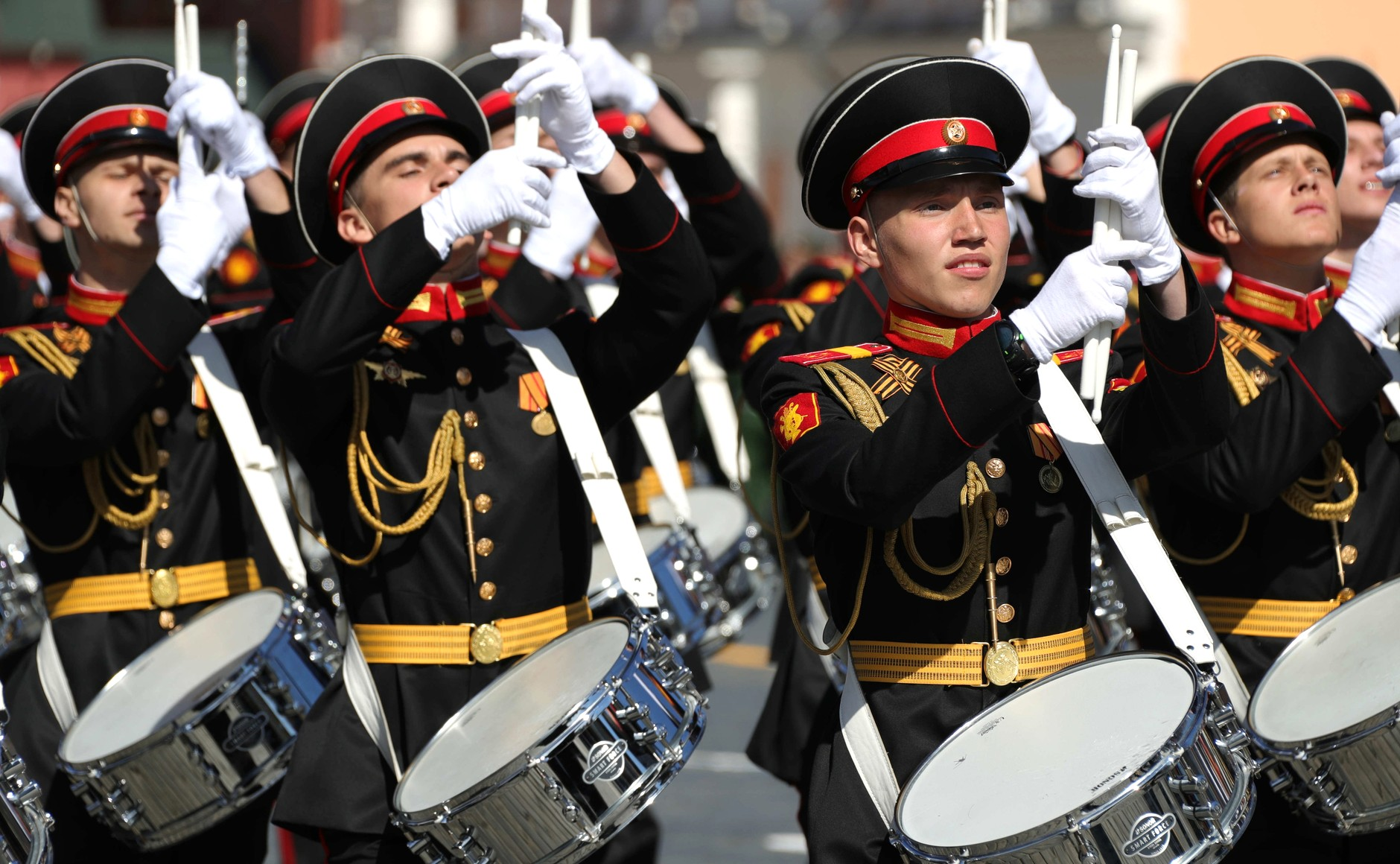
The cadets of the college at the 2018 Moscow Victory Day Parade.

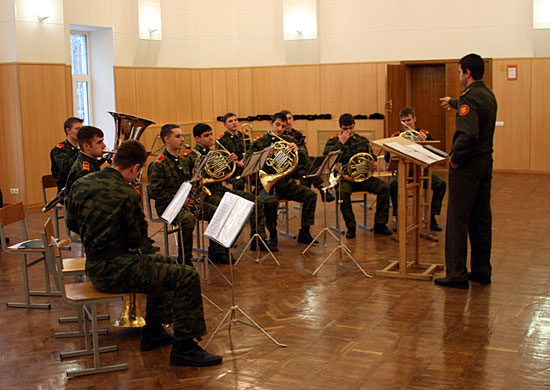
The cadet band

=== Corps of Drums ===
The college is more famous internationally for its Corps of Drums, a participant in the Moscow Victory Parade of 1945 and a regular participant in Revolution Day (1938 to 1990), Victory Day (1965, 1985, 1990, 1995–2008, 2012-), and until 1968 May Day military parades. The corps is led by a Drum Major and has been, for about 8 decades, the formation that has been beating the drum cadences that precede the march past segment of all the parades held on Red Square of national importance. The Corps's instrumentation includes snare drums, fifes, trumpets, trombones, glockenspiels and during occasions, bass drums, tenor drums and chromatic fanfare trumpets. A Turkish crescent from the college was used as its symbol in the Revolution Day and Victory Day parades from 1975 to 1990, later replaced in 1995 by the college's colour guard squad carrying the collegiate Regimental Color (a new color was granted to the institution in 2008), preceded in parades by the Commandant of the College.

=== Fiesta Drummers' Ensemble ===
The Fiesta Drummers' Ensemble (Russian: Ансамбль барабанщиков «Фиеста») of the school was created in 2005. Its current leader is Mikhail Melnik, a teacher of additional education at the school. Over the years of its existence, the ensemble has been a participant in the Eurovision Song Contest 2009 and the International Festival of Military Orchestras "Tattoo on Stage" in Lucerne, Switzerland. In 2014, the ensemble took part in the closing ceremony of the Winter Olympics at Fisht Olympic Stadium in Sochi.

== Commandants of the College ==
- Lieutenant Colonel Leonid Bank (1937-1939)
- Boris Lvovich (1939-1940)
- Colonel Vladimir Zlobin (1940-1957)
- Colonel Nikolai Nazarov (1957-1958)
- Colonel Konstantin Kamyshov (1958-1960)
- Colonel Arkady Myakishev (1961-1970)
- Colonel Vladimir Volkov (1970-1975)
- Colonel Vladimir Detisov (1975-1982)
- Colonel Konstantin Romanchenko (1982-1986)
- Colonel Arkady Dzhagupov (1986-1993)
- Colonel Gennady Afonin (1993-2005)
- Colonel Alexander Gerasimov (2005–Present)

== Notable alumni ==
- Nikolai Mikhailov
- Alexander Sladkovsky
- Valery Khalilov
- Sergey Kostiuchenko

== Gallery ==
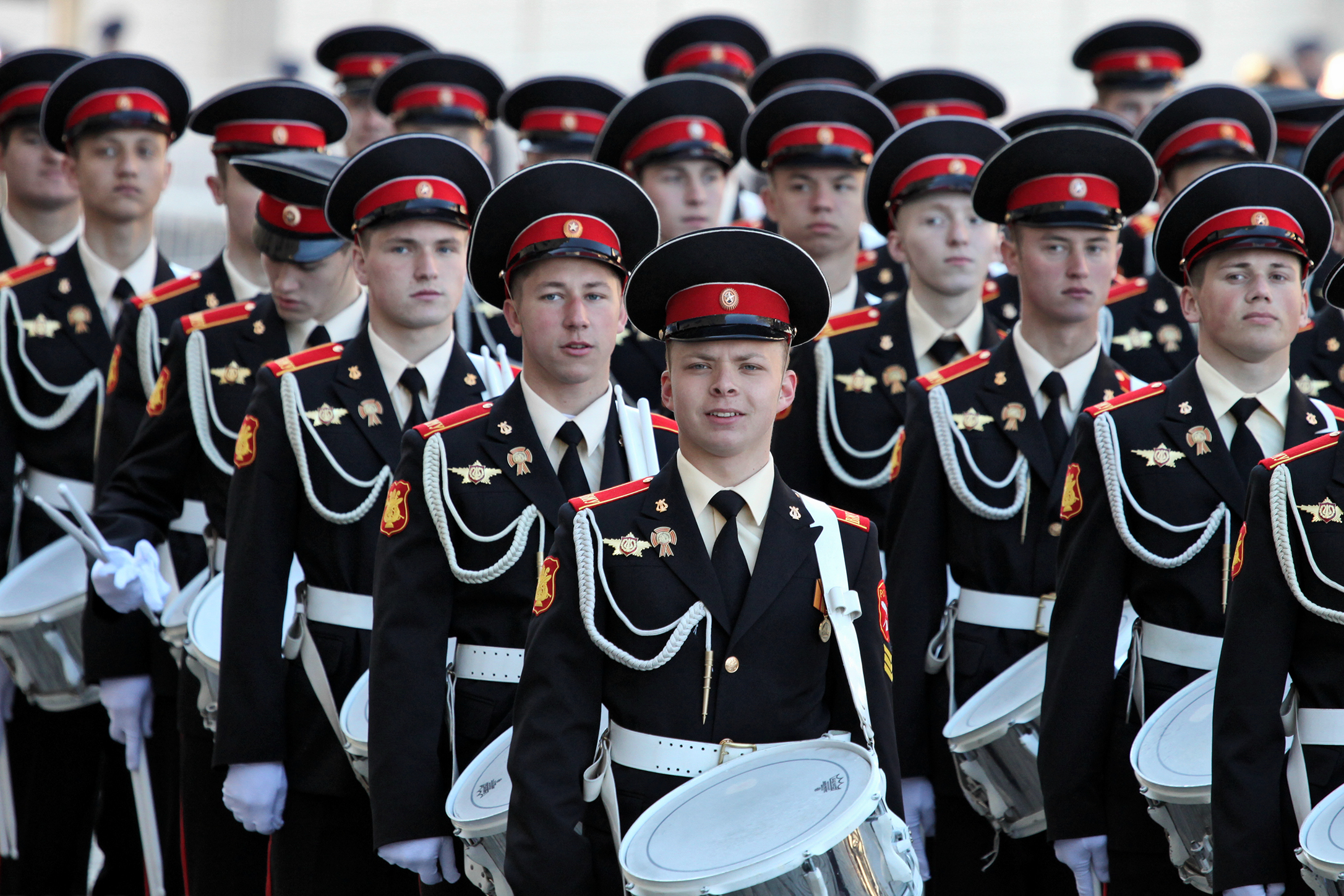
Corps of Drums during the Moscow Victory Day Parade.

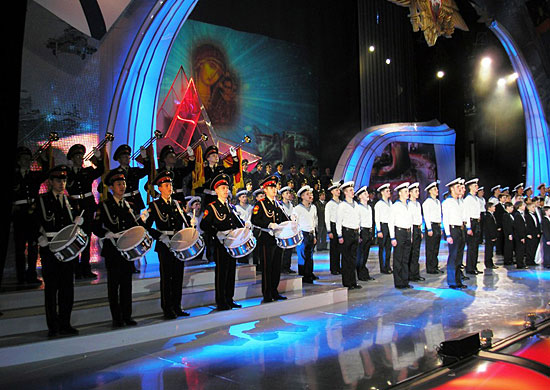
During a concert in Moscow.

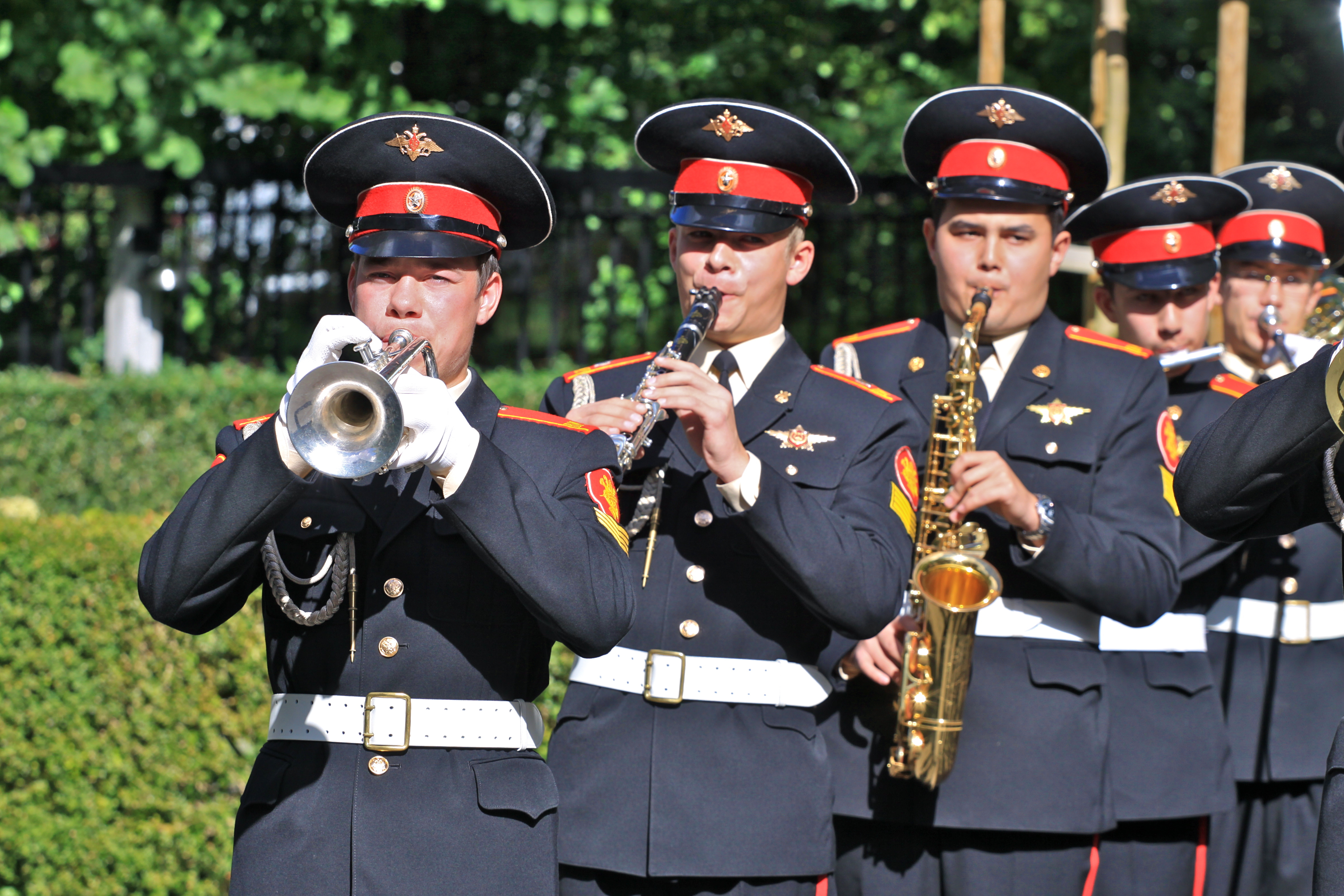
The cadets of the college military band in Bern. (marching band formation)

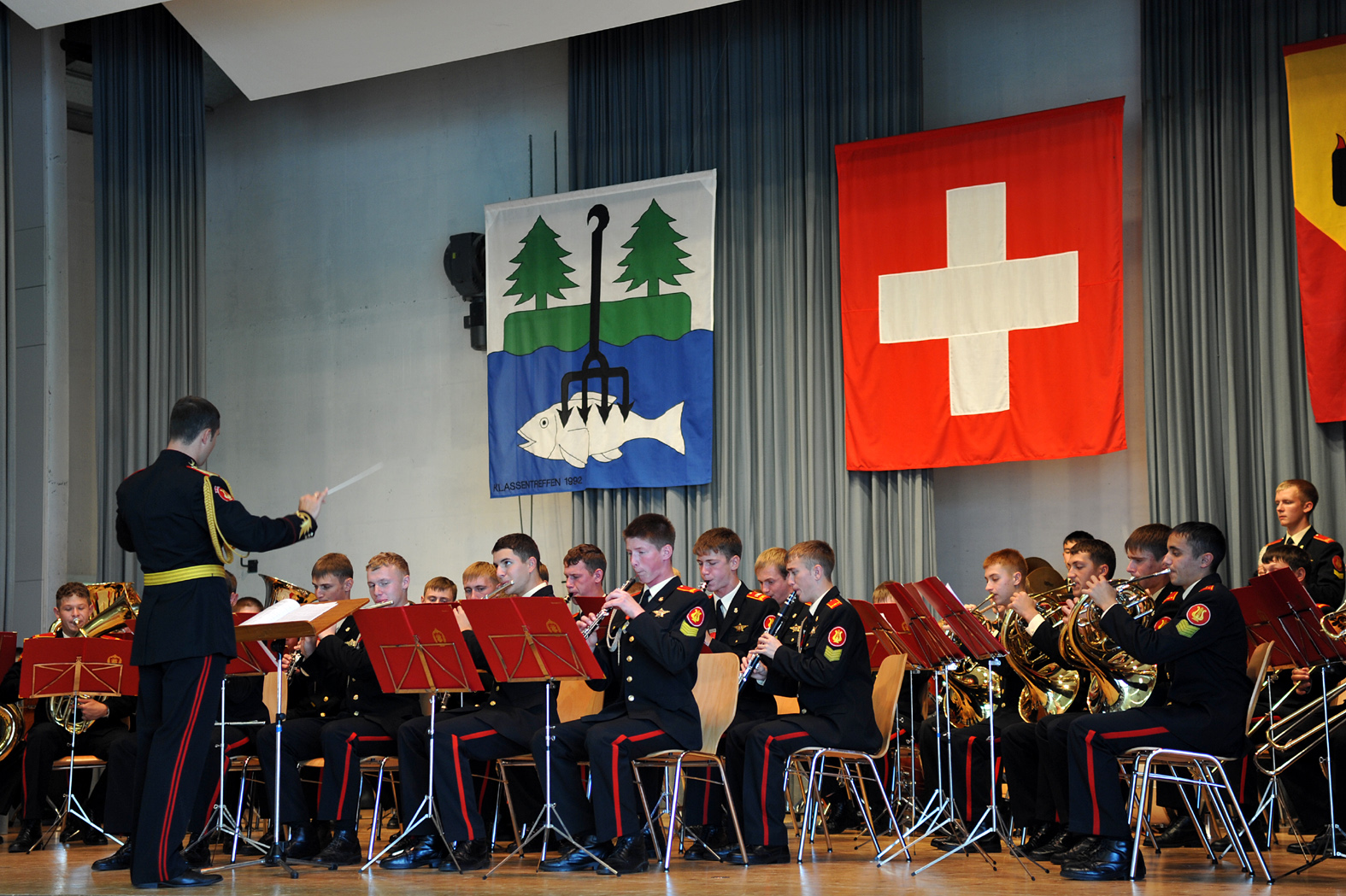
Concert band formation

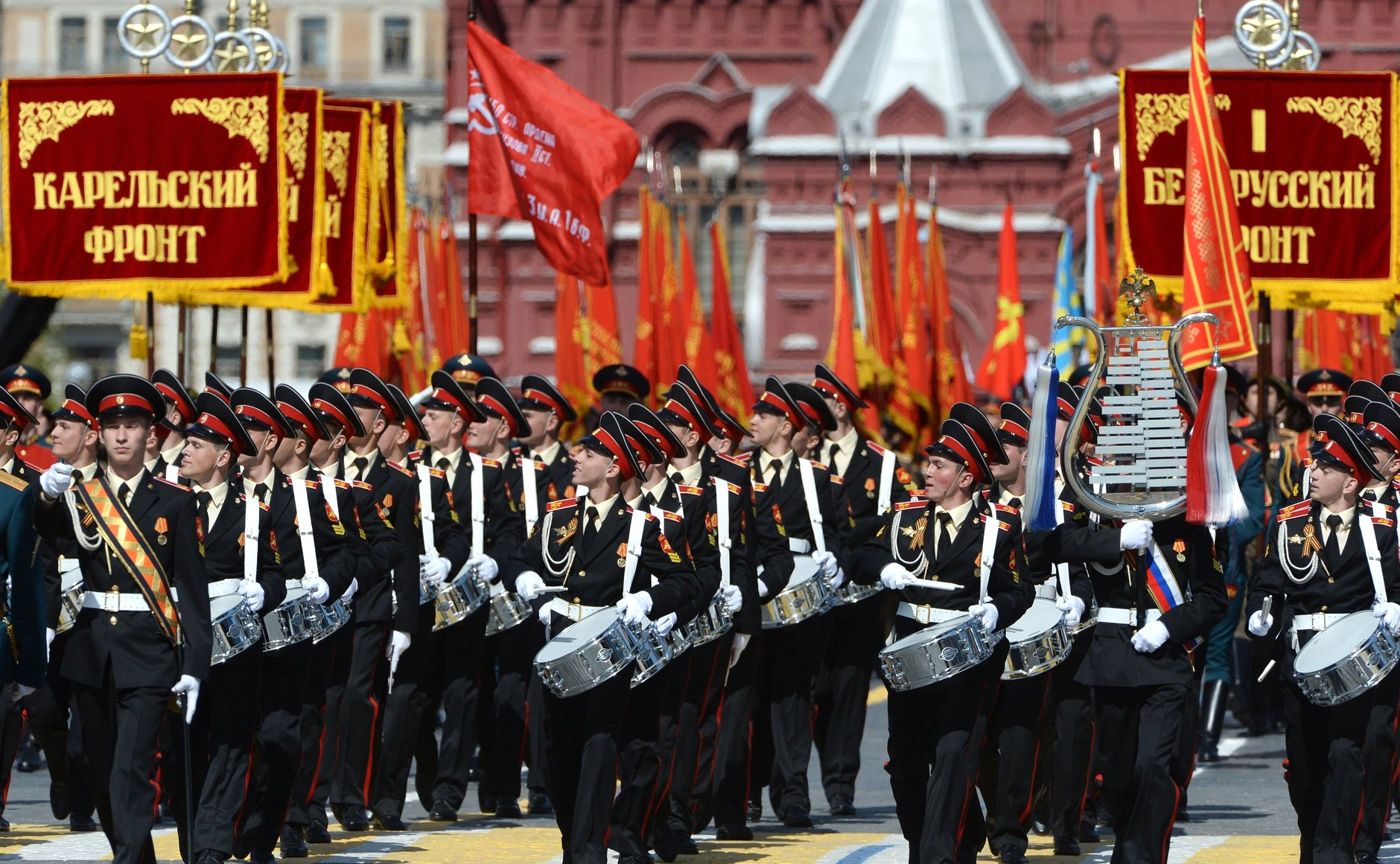
Corps of Drums on parade

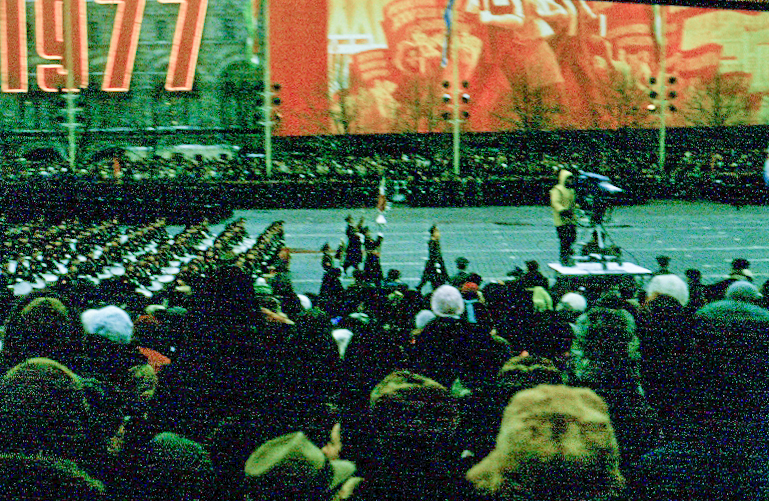
During the 1977 October Revolution Parade. Notice the Corps of Drums marching in the lead of the parade preceded by the Corps Drum Major and the College Turkish Crescent

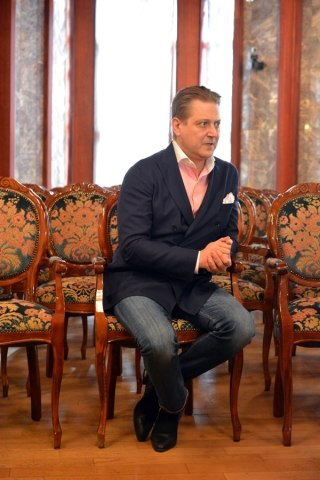
Alexander Sladkovsky, an alumnus of the school and currently the director of the Tatarstan National Symphony Orchestra

== See also ==
- Military Band Service of the Armed Forces of Russia
