= 2018 Moscow Victory Day Parade =

Russian military parade

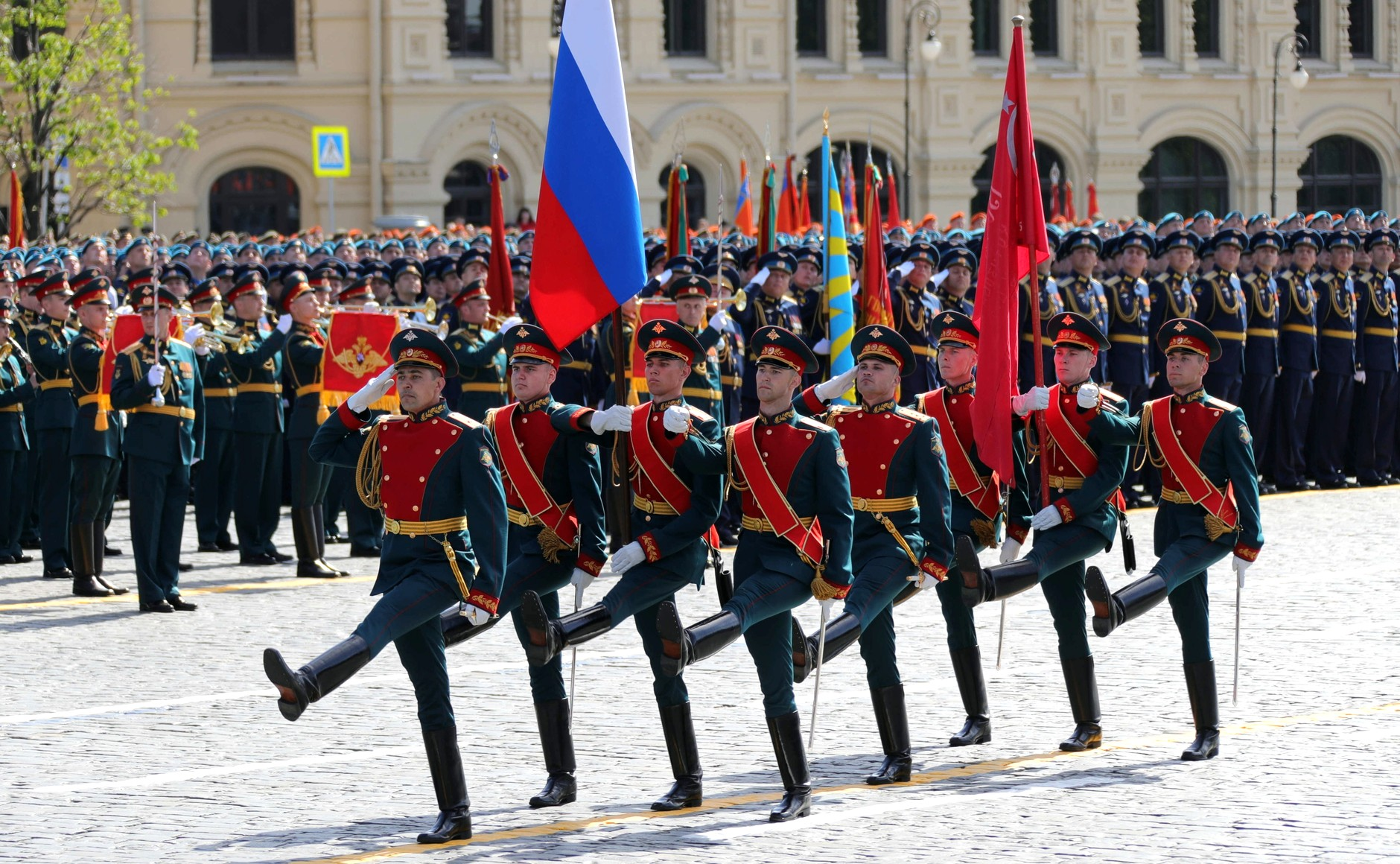
2018 Moscow Victory Day Parade

The 2018 Moscow Victory Day Parade was a military parade that took place in Red Square in Moscow on 9 May 2018 to commemorate the 73rd anniversary of the capitulation of Nazi Germany in 1945. The annual parade marks the Allied victory in World War II on the Eastern Front, on the same day as the signing of the German act of capitulation to the Allies in Berlin, at midnight of 9 May 1945 (Russian time). President of the Russian Federation Vladimir Putin delivered his 15th holiday address to the nation after the parade inspection presided over by Sergei Shoigu, the Minister of Defense and General of the Army.

== Significance and events ==
This year's parade also marked the centennial year since the 1918 foundation of the Red Army. For the first time, it was planned that historical Red Army armored vehicles from the Russian Civil War would take part in the Victory Day parade mobile column in Moscow. The planned appearance was called off, instead, the 154th Preobrazhensky Independent Commandant's Regiment's 1st Honor Guard Company took part in the exhibition drill segment of the parade, together with a drumline from the Moscow Military Music College, which is also the first time this had been done since the parade of 2007, following along with the recent tradition that began in the 2001 parade.

New military vehicles in the parade included the BMPT Terminator and 5th-generation Sukhoi Su-57 fighter jets, a pair of which flew for the first time over the Red Square, together with two MiG-31s armed with Kinzhal air-to-surface missiles.

Originally, for the first time since 2002, while other EMERCOM detachments continued to march nationwide, cadets from the Civil Defense Academy of the Ministry of Emergency Situations were not to take part in the Victory Day parade in Moscow. However, this decision was rescinded.

For the third consecutive year, the parade included a composite ceremonial female battalion from the Military University of the Ministry of Defense, the Military Academy of Material and Technical Support, and the Military Space Academy.

== Preparatory activities ==
Beginning in December 2017, preparations for the parade were well attended at the unit level. Individual unit practices were held in the various military installations for all the participating units in the national and local parades. Unit practices within Moscow Oblast itself started in early March in the Alabino field and other locations, before the full-blown parade practice run-throughs were to commence later in the same month.

All parade practice runs began on 24 March 2018 in the Alabino training range. The first practice runs started with the ground column, kicking off the 2-month long national preparations for the 73rd Victory Day. The practice runs lasted until the middle of April, when the runs on Red Square for the national parade itself started, ending with a final combined practice run of the parade in early May in the morning. From the 1st week up to the 3rd week of April, the Alabino military training center served as the parade training ground for the estimated 14,000 military personnel attending the Moscow parade, along with more than 135 vehicles and 78 aircraft. The air flypast column began their training flights on 9 April 2018.

=== Timeline for preparatory activities in Moscow ===
- 24 March towards 6 April – beginning of parade practice runs in Alabino, Moscow Oblast
- 2nd up to the 3rd week of April – General practice run-through in the Alabino training field, including a flypast
- 4th week of April until 2 days before Victory Day - practice runs in Red Square right up to the general practice run
  - 26–30 April, 2–6 May – evening parade practice run-throughs
  - 4–5 May – Air flypast practice runs
  - 6 May – the general practice run at 10 am MST

== Foreign dignitaries in attendance ==
Amongst those in attendance were:

- Prime Minister of Israel Benjamin Netanyahu
- President of Serbia Aleksandar Vučić

== Full order of the 2018 parade ==
Bold indicates first appearance, italic indicates multiple appearances, Bold and italic indicate returning appearance, all indicated unless otherwise noted.

- General of the Army Sergey Shoigu, Minister of Defense of the Russian Federation (parade inspector)
- Colonel General Oleg Salyukov, Commander-in-Chief of the Russian Ground Forces (parade commander)

=== Military Bands ===
- Massed Military Bands of the Armed Forces under the direction of the Senior Director of Music of the Military Bands Service of the Armed Forces of the Russian Federation, Colonel Timofey Mayakin
- Corps of Drums of the Moscow Military Music College

=== Ground Column ===
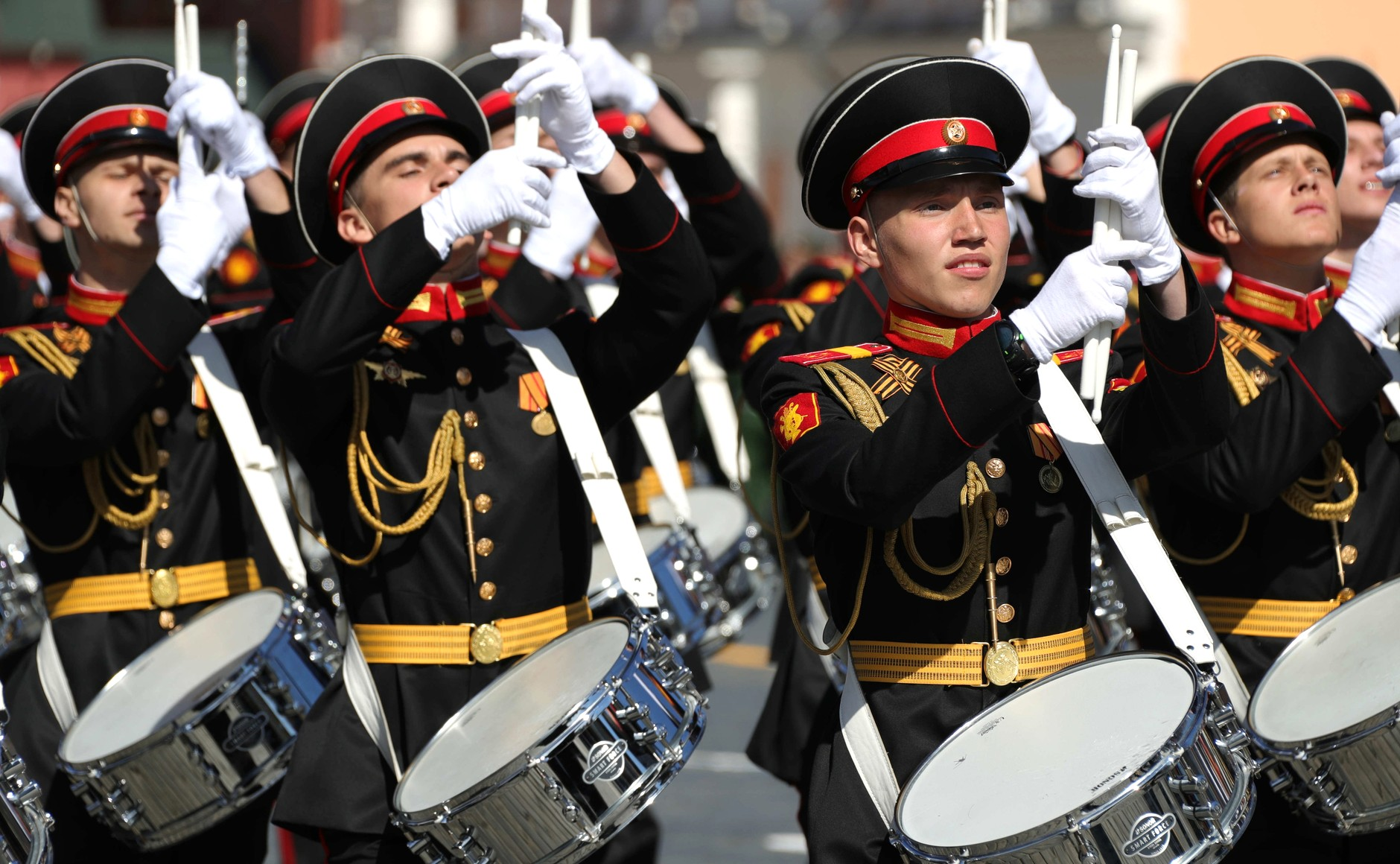
The cadets of the Moscow Military Music College Corps of Drums preparing to execute the eyes right on parade.

- 154th Preobrazhensky Independent Commandant's Regiment Colour Guard
- Honour Guard Company of the 1st Honor Guard Battalion, 154th PICR
- Suvorov Military School
- Nakhimov Naval School
- **Moscow National Guard Presidential Cadets School** (first appearance)
- Moscow Young Army Patriotic Cadets Unit (on behalf of the Young Army Cadets National Movement)
- Moscow National Pensions School Cadet Corps
- Combined Arms Academy of the Armed Forces of the Russian Federation
- Military University of the Ministry of Defense of the Russian Federation
- **Military Academy of the Armed Forces Air Defense Branch "Marshal Alexander Vasilevsky"** (first appearance)
- Military Logistics Academy "General of the Army A. V. Khrulev"
- Zhukovsky – Gagarin Air Force Academy
- Military Space Academy "Alexander Mozhaysky"
- **Baltic Naval Institute "Admiral Feodor Ushakov"** (returning)
- **Black Sea Higher Naval Military Institute "Admiral Pavel Nakhimov"** (returning)
- 336th Independent Guards Biaystok Marine Brigade of the Baltic Fleet
- 61st Kirkinesskaya Red Banner Marine Brigade of the Northern Fleet
- Peter the Great Military Academy of the Strategic Missile Forces
- Ryazan Higher Airborne Command School "Gen. of the Army Vasily Margelov"'
- 98th Guards Airborne Division
- **Moscow Military Police Battalion** (first appearance)
- Engineering Forces, Nuclear, Biological and Chemical Defence and Control Military Academy "Marshal of the Soviet Union Semyon Timoshenko"
- 29th and 38th Independent Railway Brigades of the Russian Railway Troops
- Civil Defense Academy of the Ministry of Emergency Situations
- Separate Operational Purpose Division of the National Guard Forces Command, Federal National Guard Troops Service of the Russian Federation "Felix Dzerzhinsky"
- Moscow Border Guards Institute of the Federal Security Service of the Russian Federation
- 2nd Guards Tamanskaya Motor Rifle Division "Mikhail Kalinin"
- 4th Guards Kantemirovskaya Tank Division "Yuri Andropov"
- 27th Independent Guards Sevastopol Motor Rifle Brigade "60th Diamond Jubilee Anniversary of the formation of the USSR"
- Moscow Higher Military Command School "Supreme Soviet of Russia"

=== Mobile Column ===
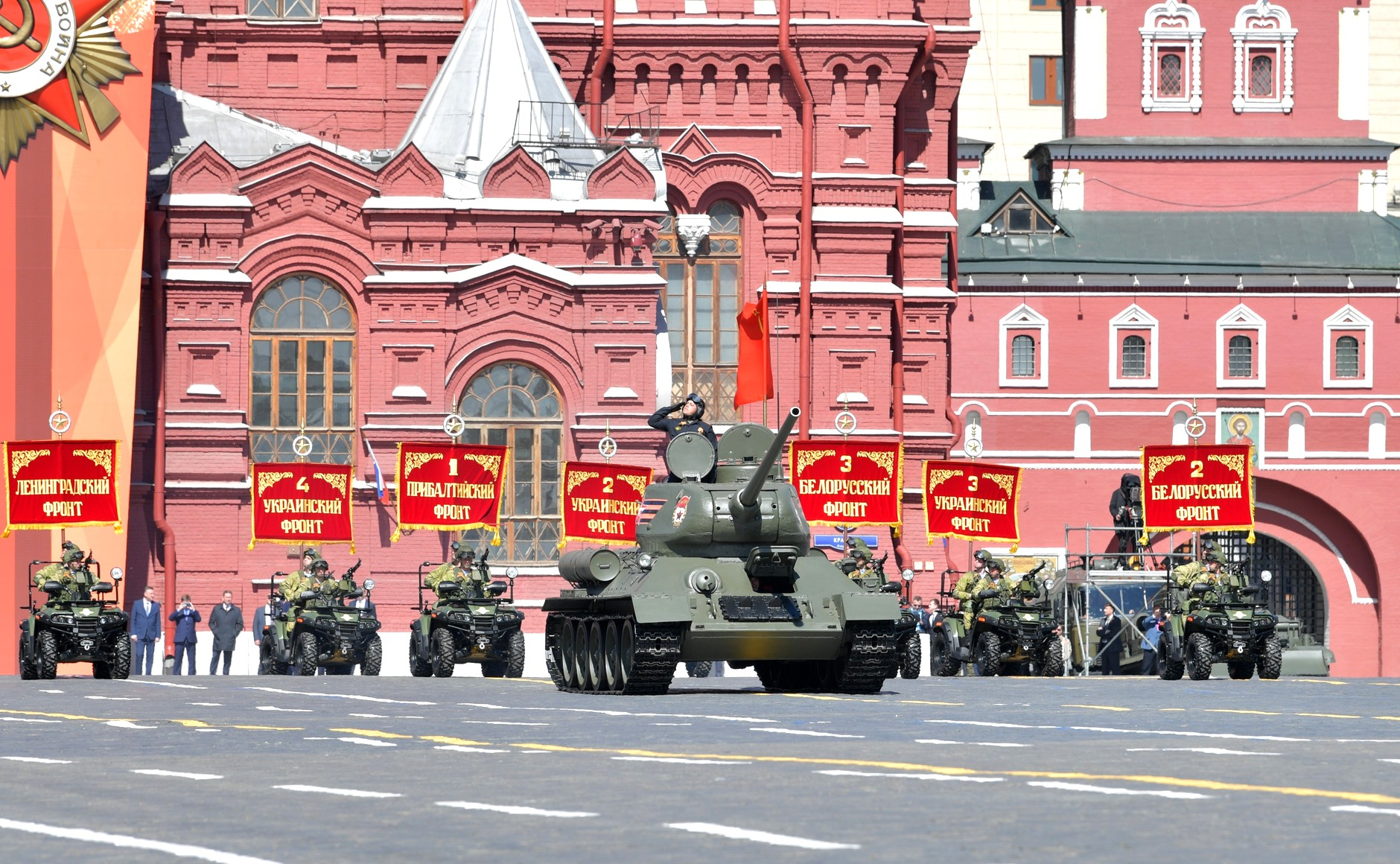
A T-34/85 medium tank on Red Square.

- T-34/85 medium tank
- **AM1** all-terrain vehicle (AM: Армейский Мотовездеход - "Army all-terrain vehicle") with 6P41 Pecheneg general purpose machine gun (45th Guards Independent Reconnaissance Brigade)
- GAZ-233114 "Tigr-M" infantry mobility vehicle (45th Guards Independent Reconnaissance Brigade)
- GAZ-233114 "Tigr-M" with Arbalet-DM remote weapon station mounting a Kord heavy machine gun (45th Guards Independent Reconnaissance Brigade)
- Kornet D/EM mobile ATGM system on the GAZ-233116 "Tigr-M" chassis (45th Guards Independent Reconnaissance Brigade)
- Kamaz 53949 Typhoon-K light MRAP (Russian military police)
- Ural Typhoon MRAP (Russian military police)
- BMP Kurganets-25 IFV (27th Independent Guards "Sevastopol" Motorized Rifle Brigade)
- BMP-3 infantry fighting vehicle (27th Independent Guards "Sevastopol" Motorized Rifle Brigade)
- T-14 main battle tank (2nd Guards "Tamanskaya" Motorized Rifle Division)
- T-72B3M (T-72B4) modernized main battle tank (2nd Guards "Tamanskaya" Motorized Rifle Division)
- **BMPT Terminator** armored support combat vehicle (2nd Guards "Tamanskaya" Motorized Rifle Division)
- BTR-MDM "Rakushka" APC (106th Guards Tula Airborne Division)
- BMD-4M air-droppable IFV (106th Guards Tula Airborne Division)
- 2S35 Koalitsiya-SV tracked self-propelled howitzer (147th Guards "Simferopol" Self-Propelled Artillery Regiment)
- 2S19 Msta-S tracked self-propelled howitzer (147th Guards "Simferopol" Self-Propelled Artillery Regiment)
- 9K720 Iskander mobile tactical ballistic missile system (112th Guards "Novorossiysk" MRL Brigade)
- **BM-30 Smerch** mobile MRL system (112th Guards "Novorossiysk" MRL Brigade)
- Buk-M2 mobile tracked SAM system (6th Independent Tank Brigade)
- Tor-M2U SAM complex on tracked chassis (6th Independent Tank Brigade)
- TTM-1901-40 snowmobile with 6P41 Pecheneg general purpose machine gun
- Tor-M2DT point-defense SAM system on tracked Vityaz chassis (80th Independent (Arctic) Motor Rifle Brigade)
- Pantsir-S1 mobile SAM system on wheeled chassis (93rd Guards Anti-Aircraft Rocket Regiment)
- S-400 SAM launch system on 5P85SM2-01 transporter-erector launcher (93rd Guards Anti-Aircraft Rocket Regiment)
- **Uran-6** unmanned mine-clearing vehicle
- **Uran-9** unmanned ground combat vehicle
- **Katran** unmanned tactical surveillance helicopter
- **Korsar** unmanned aerial vehicle
- **Patrul-A** MRAP (National Guard of Russia Separate Operational Purpose Division, National Guard Forces Command)
- **Ural-VV** MRAP (National Guard of Russia Separate Operational Purpose Division, National Guard Forces Command)
- RS-24 Yars ICBM on 15U175M wheeled transporter-erector launcher (54th Guards Rocket Division)
- UAZ-23632-148-64 pickup truck with Kord and Pecheneg machine guns as escort for RS-24 (54th Guards Rocket Division)
- VPK-7829 Bumerang wheeled APC

=== Air Fly Past Column ===
- 1 Mil Mi-26
- 4 Mil Mi-8AMTSh
- 4 Mil Mi-28 from the Berkuts
- 4 Kamov Ka-52
- 4 Mil Mi-35
- 1 Tupolev Tu-160
- 4 Tupolev Tu-22M3
- 1 Antonov An-124
- 3 Ilyushin Il-76MD
- 3 Tupolev Tu-95MS
- 1 Ilyushin Il-78 and 1 Tupolev Tu-160
- 6 Mikoyan MiG-29SMT
- 4 Sukhoi Su-24M
- 6 Mikoyan MiG-31
- 4 Sukhoi Su-34
- **2 Sukhoi Su-57** (first appearance)
- 4 Sukhoi Su-34, 4 Sukhoi Su-30 and 2 Sukhoi Su-35S
- Sukhoi Su-30SM and Mikoyan MiG-29SMT of the Russian Knights and Strizhi
- 6 Sukhoi Su-25
- **2 Mikoyan MiG-31K with Kh-47M2 Kinzhals** (first appearance)

== Other parades ==
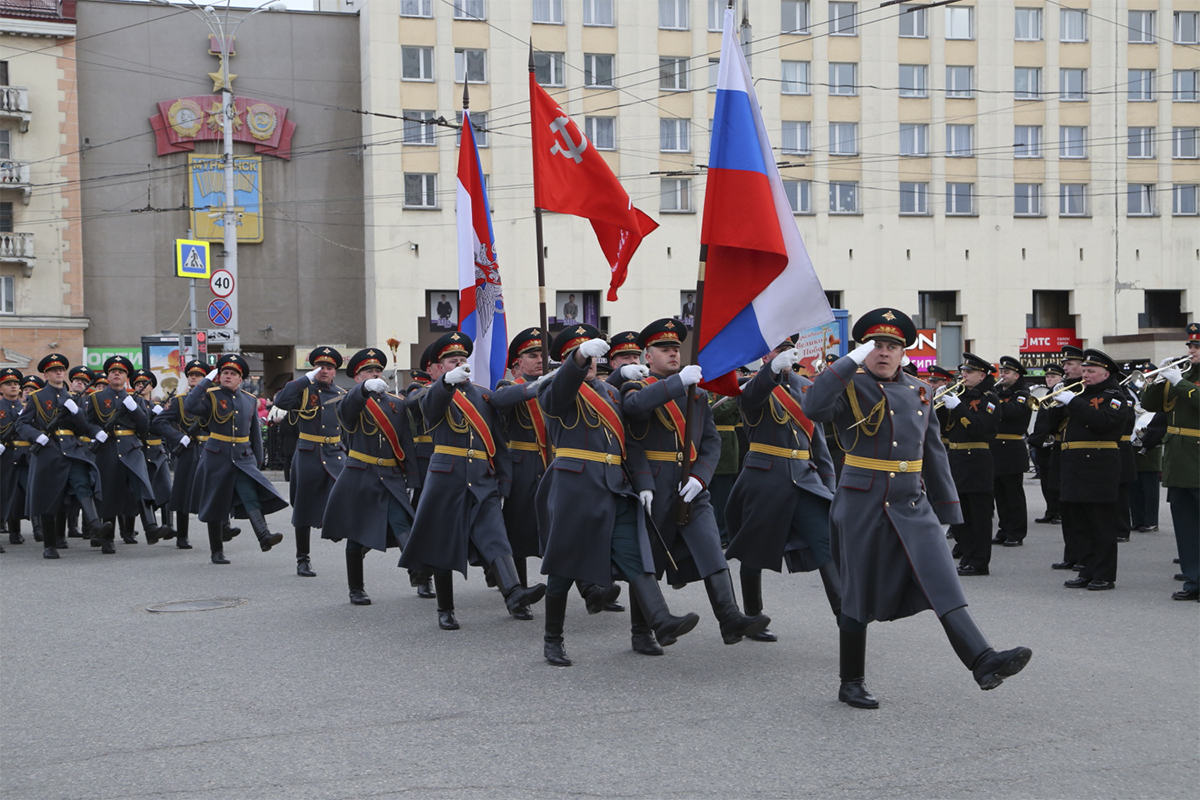
Rehearsals for the Victory Day Parade in Murmansk in 2018.

As per tradition, 27 other Russian major cities (Sevastopol and Kerch in Crimea) held their commemorative parades on that day (some of them including flypasts), and joint civil-military parades are to be hosted by 50 other towns and cities nationwide. Similar celebrations were held in almost all the former republics of the Soviet Union.

== Gallery ==
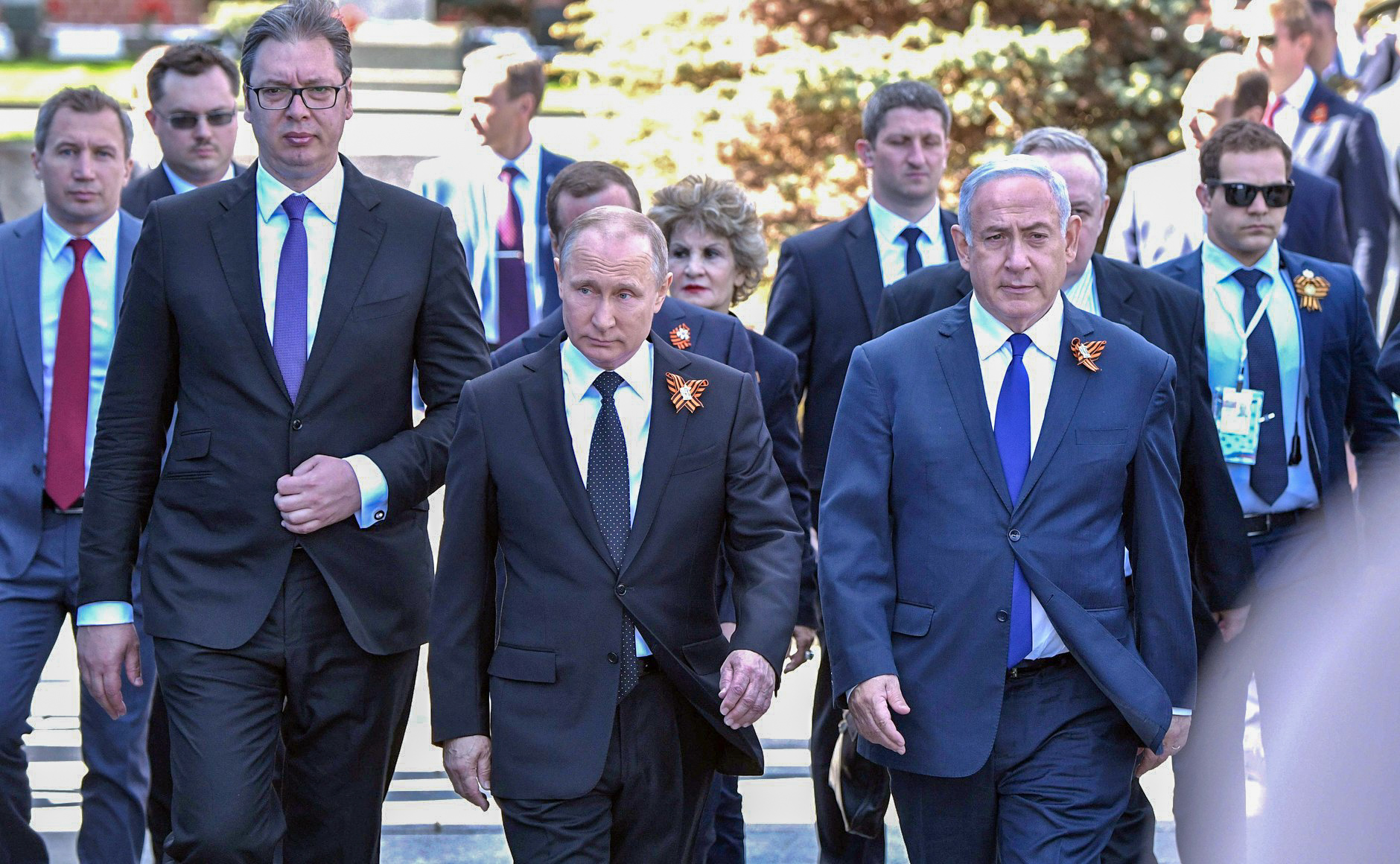
Vladimir Putin with Serbian President Aleksandar Vučić and Israeli Prime Minister Benjamin Netanyahu.

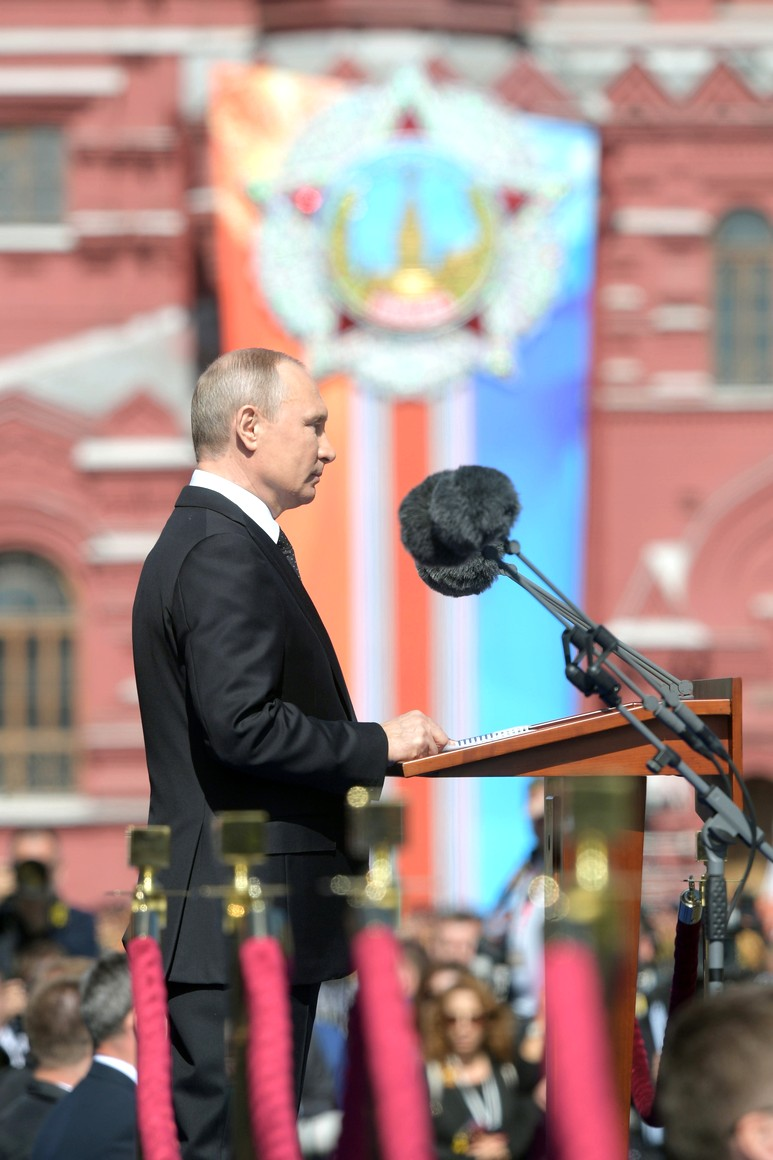
Vladimir Putin delivering his address dedicated to the annual Victory Day.

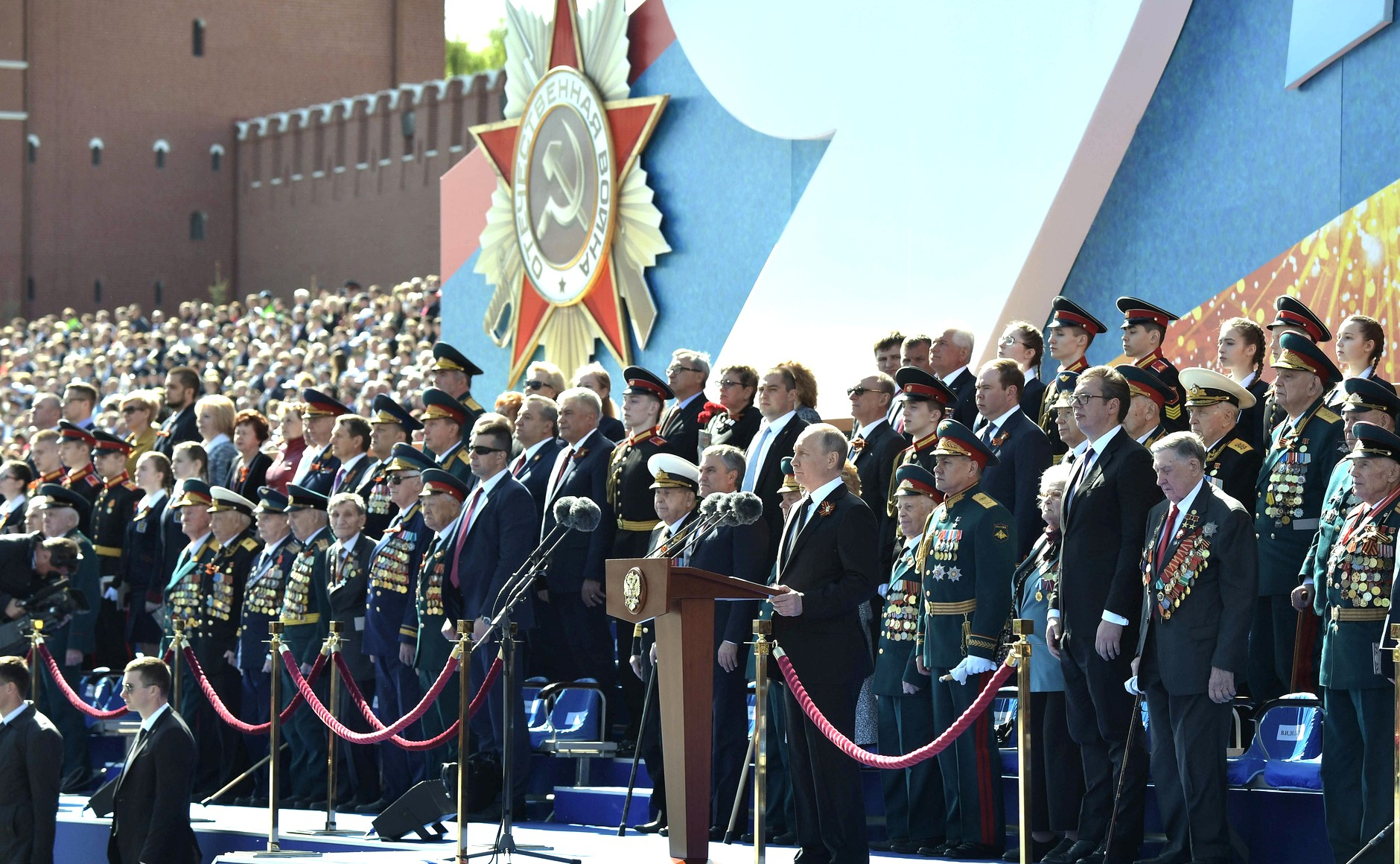
Putin among the veterans and officials.

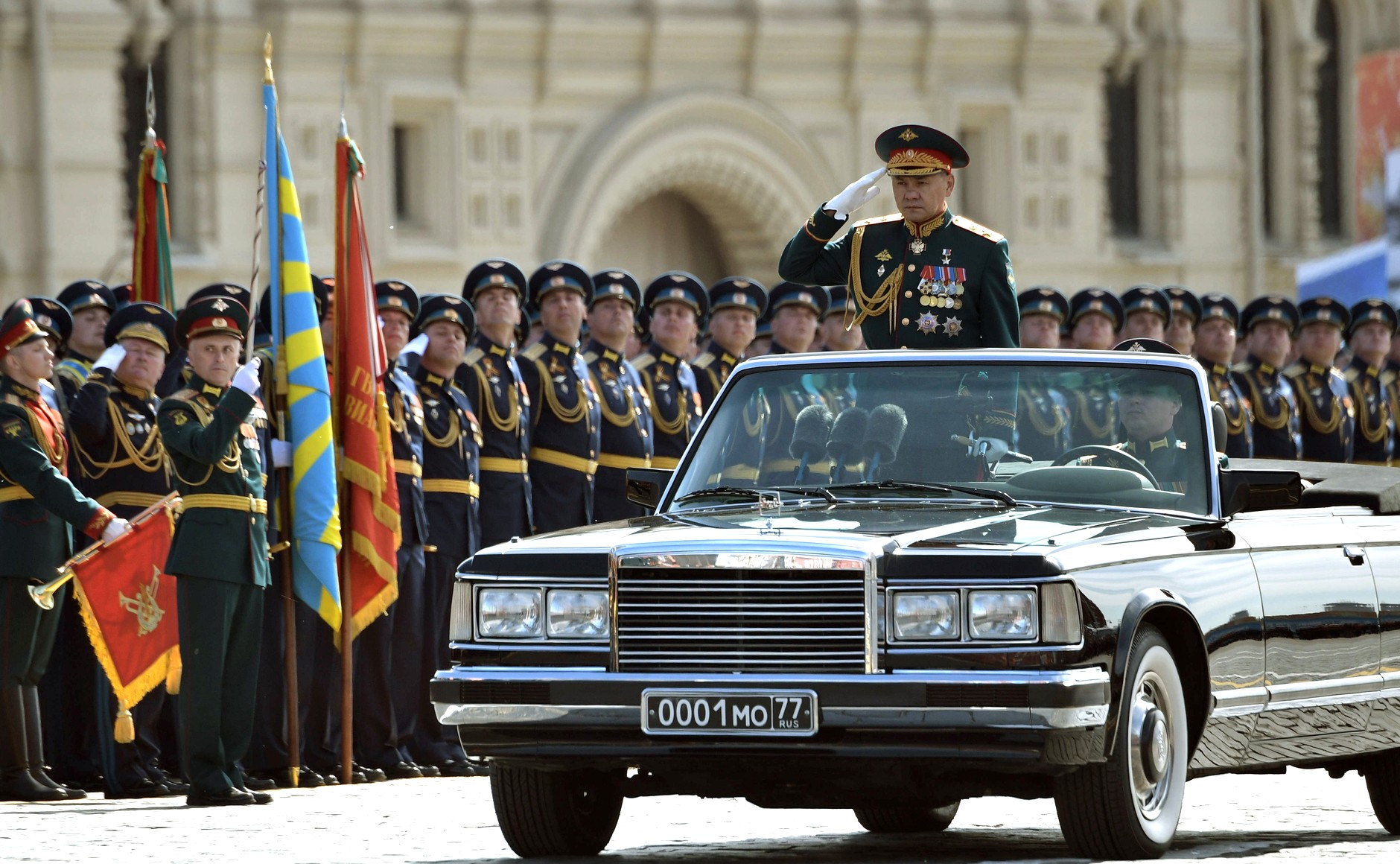
Russian Defense Minister Sergey Shoigu.

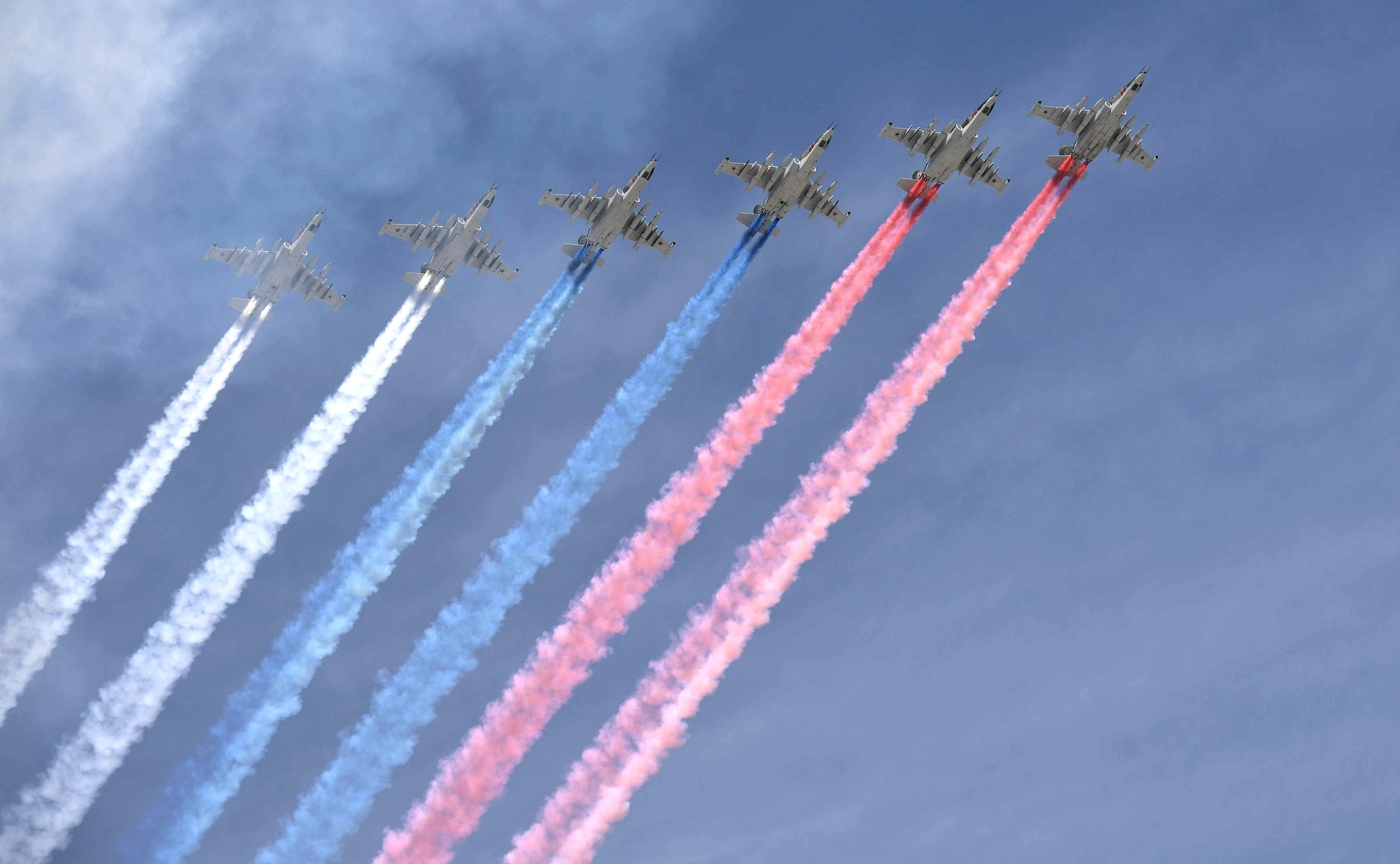
6 Sukhoi Su-25s displaying color smoke of the Russian Flag

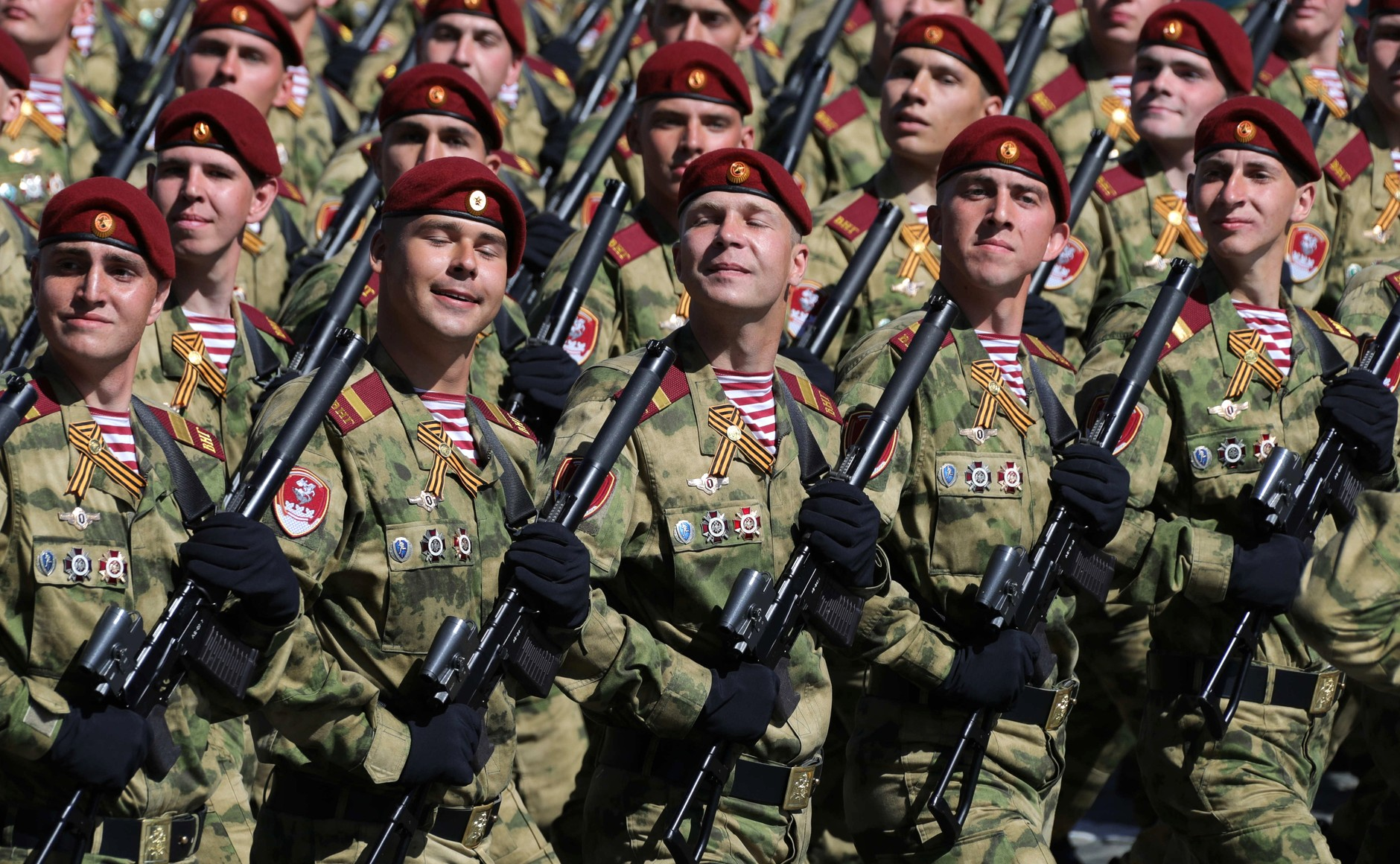
National Guard Troops.

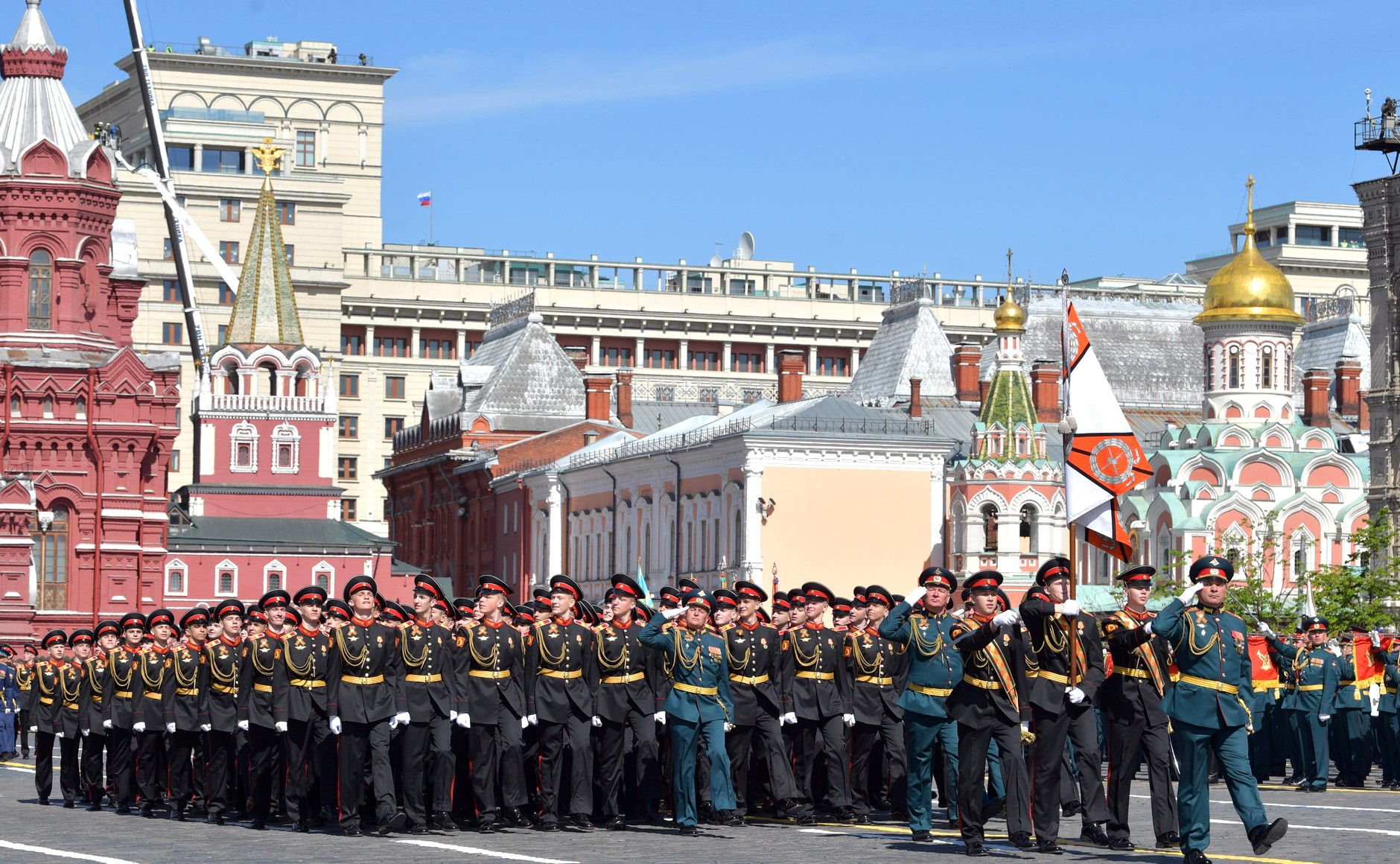
Cadets of the Moscow Suvorov Military School.

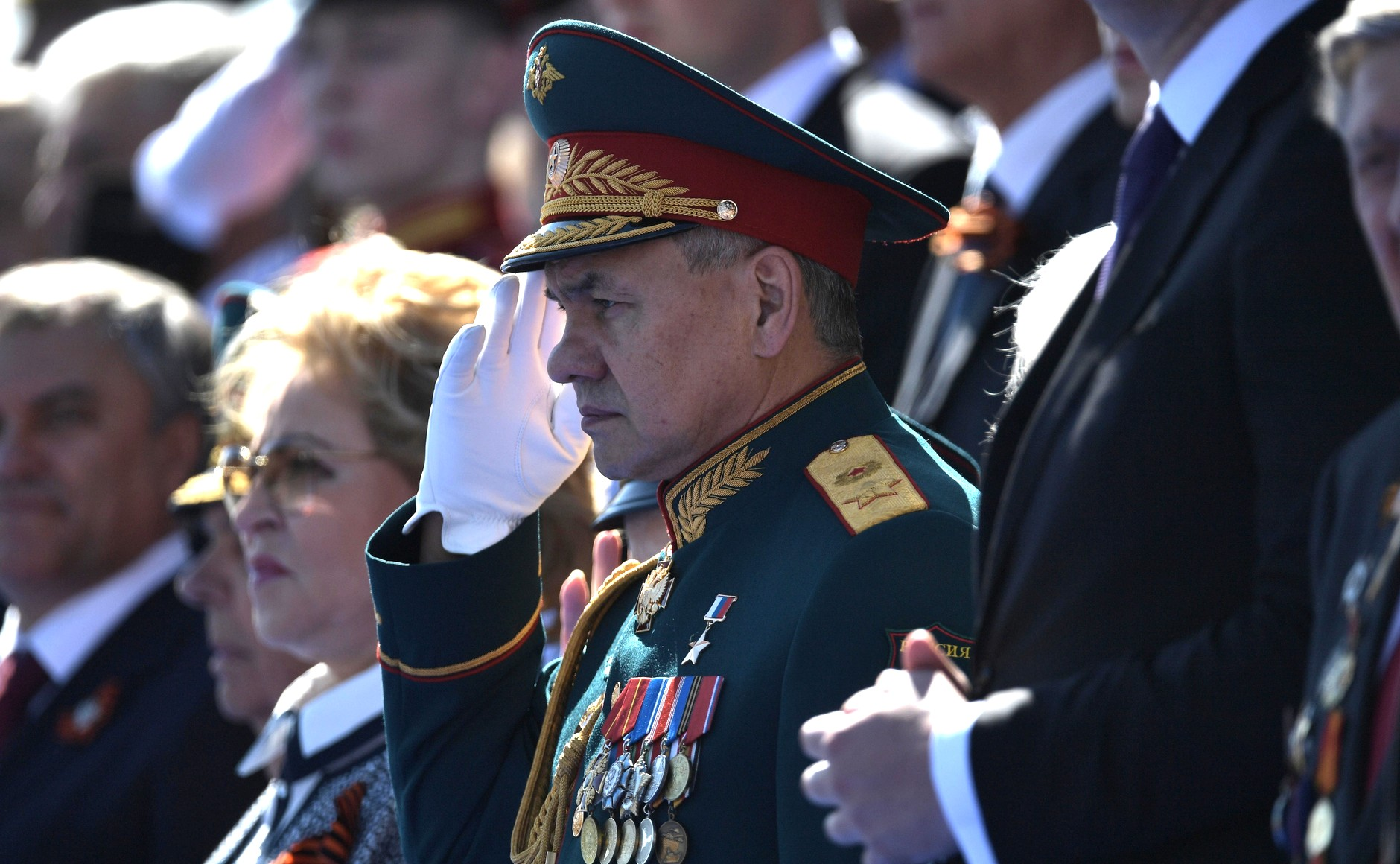
Sergey Shoigu

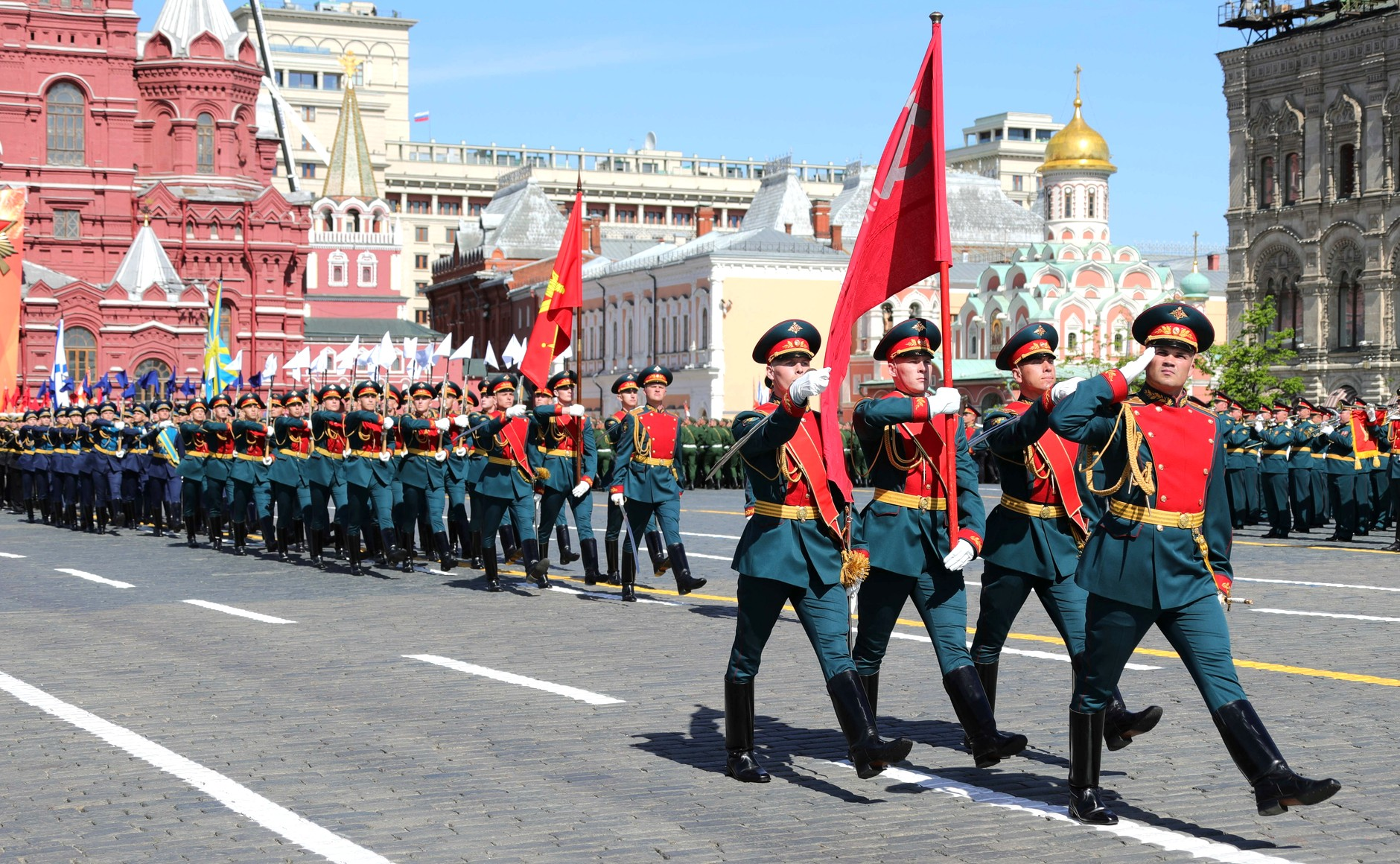
Troops of the 154th Independent Commandants Regiment during the parade.

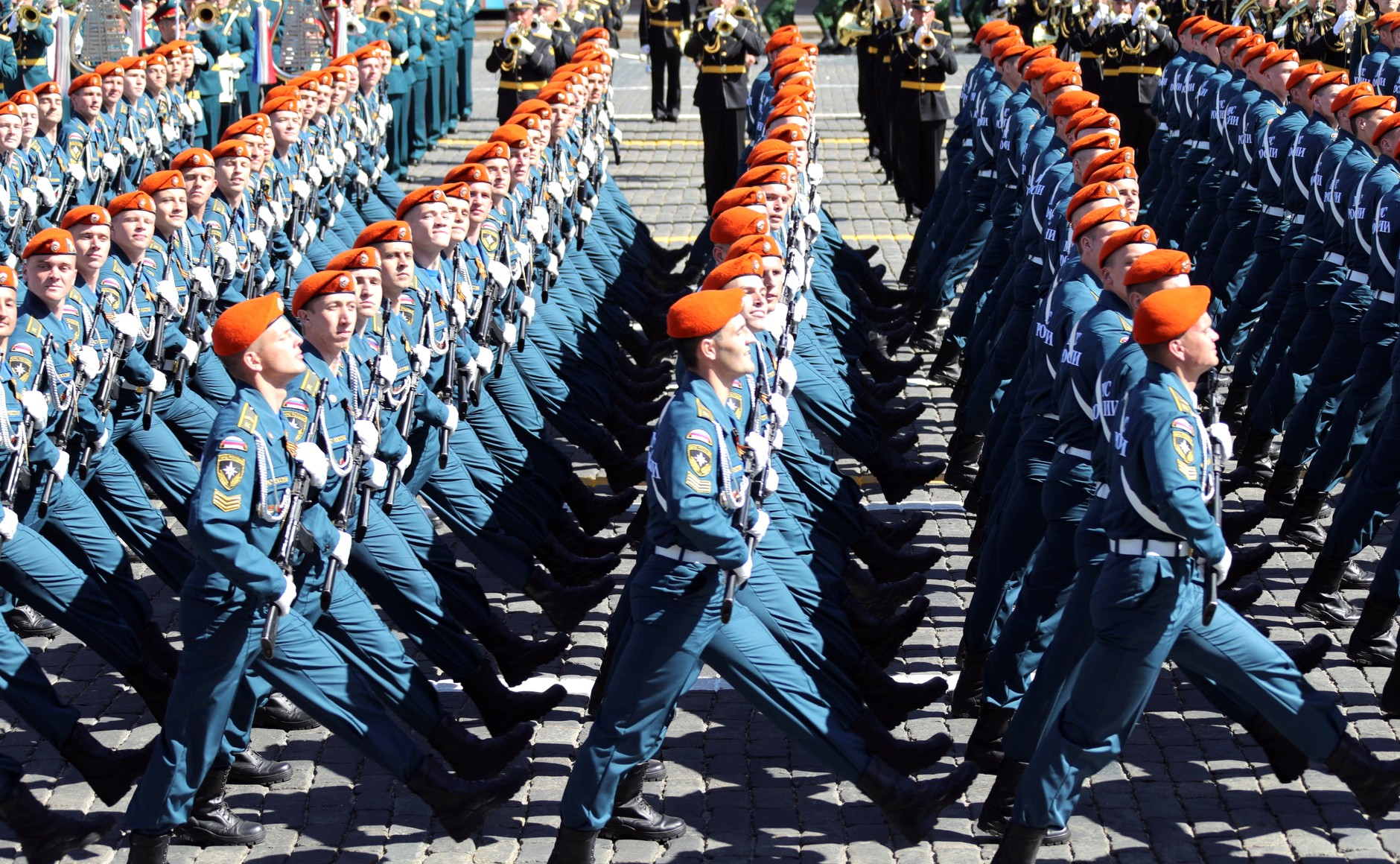
Cadets of the Civil Defense Academy of the Ministry of Emergency Situations.

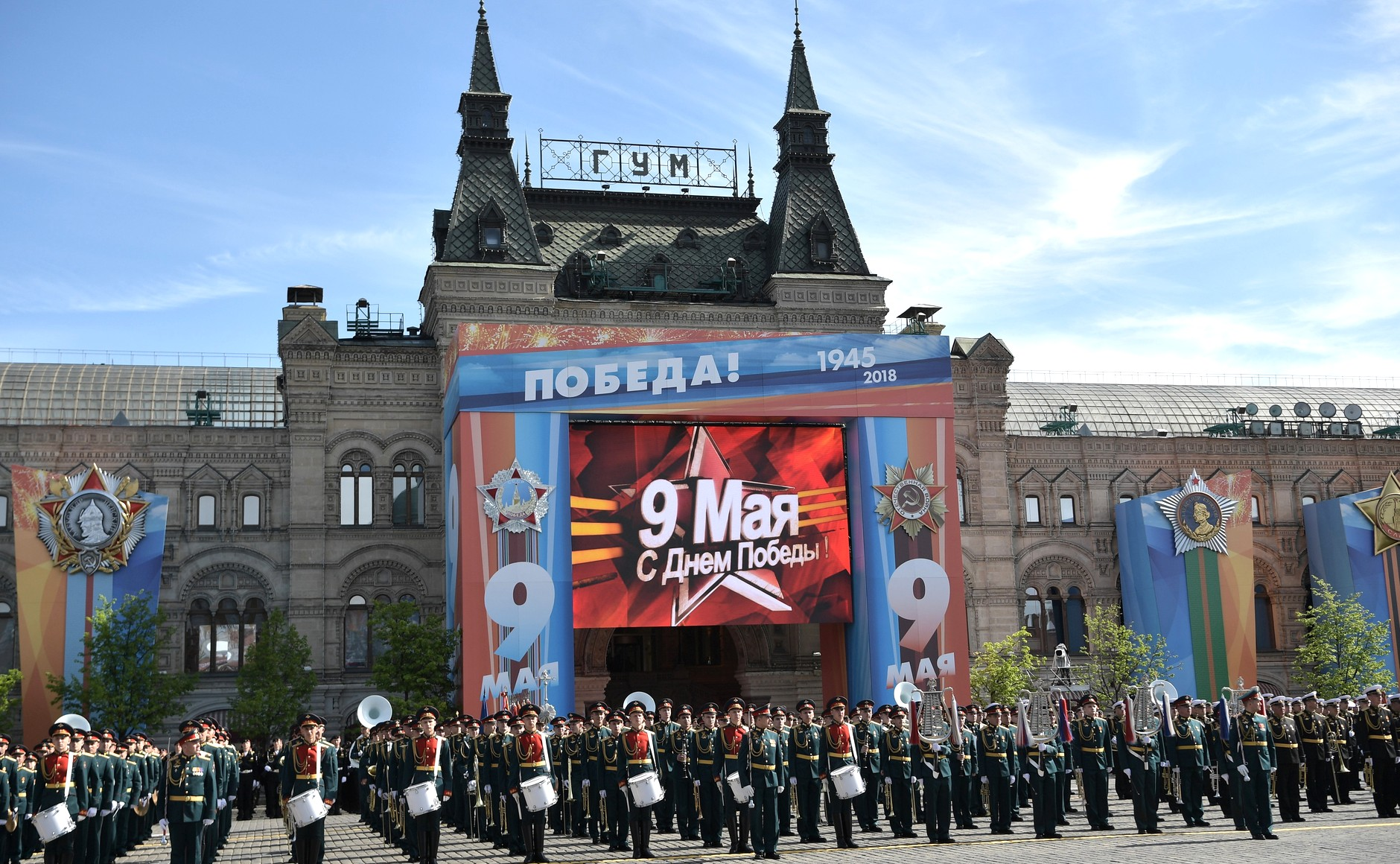
The massed bands.

== See also ==
- Moscow Victory Parade of 1945
- Victory Day (9 May)
- Victory in Europe Day
- Victory Day Parades
