= Nikolay Mikhaylov (conductor) =

Soviet military conductor

Major General Nikolay Mikhaylov
- Николай Михайлович Михайлов
- Born: September 15, 1932; Gornaya-Usa, Bashkir ASSR, Soviet Union
- Died: October 22, 2006 (aged 74); Moscow, Russia
- Military career
- Allegiance: USSR; Russia
- Service years: 1950–1993
- Rank: Major General

Nikolay Mikhaylovich Mikhaylov (Russian: Николай Михайлович Михайлов) was a Soviet military conductor. He was the Senior Director of the Military Band Service of the Armed Forces of the Soviet Union from 1976 to 1993.

== Early life and career ==
Mikhaylov was born in 1932 in the village Usa in the Bashkir ASSR. In 1945, he studied at the Moscow Military Music College. Being a cadet at the college, he took part in the Moscow Victory Parade of 1945 as a drummer of the school. In 1950 he graduated from the school and studied at the Institute of Military Conductors. From 1965 to 1970 he was the senior director of the central orchestra of the Volga Military District. In 1975, Mikhaylov was appointed deputy chief of the Moscow State Conservatory. In 1976, he was appointed Chief Conductor of the Central Military Band of the Ministry of Defense of the USSR and Chief Conductor of the Military Band Service of the Armed Forces of the Soviet Union. He commanded the massed bands during Victory Day Parades and Revolution Day Parades for 14 years from 1976 to 1990. He was released from this post in early 1993. He died in Moscow on October 22, 2006, and was buried in Vostryakovskoe Cemetery.

== Legacy ==
The Nikolay Mikhaylov Moscow Concert Wind Brass and All-Russian Competition of Brass Orchestras is named after Mikhaylov. Russian military bands, specifically the Military Band Service of the Armed Forces of the Soviet Union grew enormously under general Mikhaylov. The band tradition under his leadership was modernized as well as strengthened in order to keep up with the cultural advancement of the Soviet Armed Forces, Soviet society and international military bands. Bands became more notable and accessible in the 17 years he led the service, with the massed bands of the Moscow Military District taking part in the opening and closing ceremonies of the 1980 Summer Olympics in its debut performance to a worldwide audience.

== Awards ==
- Order of the Red Star
- Honored Artist of the RSFSR (1978)
- Lenin Komsomol Prize (1981)
- State Prize of the USSR (1985)
- Honored Artist of the Russian Federation

== See also ==
- Valery Khalilov
- Yusif Akhundzade
- John R. Bourgeois

Political offices
Preceded by Nikolai Nazarov	Senior Director of Music of the Military Band Service of the Armed Forces; 1976 – 1993	Succeeded by Viktor Afanasyev
