= Viktor Afanasyev (military musician) =

Russian conductor of military choir (1947–2020)

Lieutenant General Viktor Afanasyev
- Born: 17 May 1947; Temizhbekskaya, Kavkazsky District, Krasnodar Krai, RSFSR, Soviet Union
- Died: 1 February 2020 (aged 72); Moscow, Russia
- Military career
- Allegiance: USSR; Russia
- Service years: 1972-2002
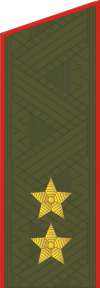
- Rank: Lieutenant General

Viktor Vasilievich Afanasyev (Russian: Виктор Васильевич Афанасьев; 17 May 1947 – 1 February 2020) was a Soviet and Russian military conductor. He was the Senior Director of the Military Band Service of the Armed Forces of Russia from 1993 to 2002.

== Early life and career ==
In 1972 he graduated from the Military Conducting Department of the Moscow Conservatory before beginning to teach classes at the Alma-Ata Conservatory 9 years later. He had previously served between 1979 and 1982 as the director of the Band of the Central Asian Military District, the Band of the Baltic Military District, and the Band of the Western Group of Forces. Following the resignation of Major General Nikolay Mikhaylov in 1993, Afanasyev was immediately appointed as the chief director of the Military Band Service of the Armed Forces of Russia, and the conductor of the combined massed bands of the Moscow Garrison. He served in this position until 2003, when he was replaced by Colonel Valery Khalilov. He then taught master classes at the Moscow Conservatory and had also served as dean of the orchestral faculty of the Moscow State Art and Cultural University.

Afanasyev died in Moscow on 1 February 2020. He was buried in the Federal Military Memorial Cemetery on 5 February.

Political offices
Preceded by Nikolai Mikhailov	Senior Director of Music of the Military Band Service of the Armed Forces; 1993 – 2002	Succeeded by Valery Khalilov
