= Rotterdam Marine Band of the Royal Netherlands Navy =

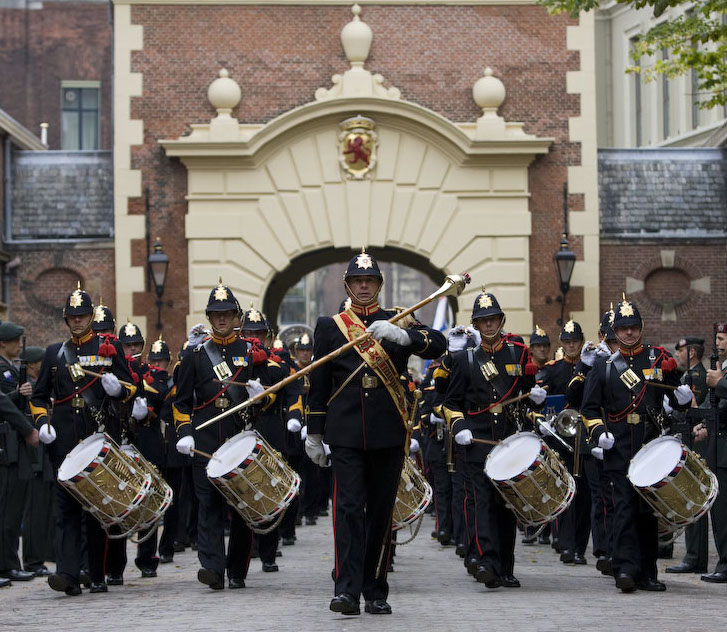
- The band during Prinsjesdag in 2009.
- Active: 1945; 81 years ago
- Country: Netherlands
- Branch: Royal Netherlands Navy
- Type: Military Band
- Size: 53
- Part of: Netherlands Marine Corps
- Garrison/HQ: Rotterdam
- Anniversaries: 1 August

Commanders
- Current commander: Major Arjan Tien (since March 2017)

The Rotterdam Marine Band of the Royal Netherlands Navy, also referred to as the Band of the Korps Mariniers or simply the Dutch Marine Band (Dutch: Marinierskapel der Koninklijke Marine) is the Royal Netherlands Navy's official musical unit. Like Britain's Royal Marines Band Service it is the representative band of the entire navy despite being a reporting unit of the Korps Mariners, as sub-branch in the Dutch Armed Forces. Based in the port city of Rotterdam, the band was founded on 1 August 1945 as a continuation of the pre-war Regimental Band of the Royal Netherlands Navy.

== History ==
The regimental band was established in 1864 by order of William III, the then King of the Netherlands and Grand Duke of Luxembourg. When the Korps Mariniers was founded in 1665, special drummer units had been attached to marine battalions, with the sole purpose of indicating the rhythm while marching. Around 1699, fifes were also added, which would give the entire unit a resemblance to a British Corps of Drums. During its 1864 establishment, the corps of drums was expanded to become a full wind band. It was dissolved in 1940 due to the involvement of the Netherlands in World War II and the Battle of the Netherlands.

== Events ==
Today, it supports all marine and national events, including Koningsdag, Prinsjesdag, Veteranendag and Dutch Armed Forces Day as well as service days for the marines such as 10 December and 1 August. The band has also performed alongside other military bands representing the naval infantry of other countries, performing with the Royal Marines Band Service and the 2nd Marine Division Band (United States Marine Corps) on Horse Guards Parade during the 2014 Beating Retreat. It has also performed several times in Russia touring to St. Petersburg in 1997 and 2003 (the former being in honor of the as part of the celebrations of 300th anniversary of Peter the Great) and the 2013 Spasskaya Tower Military Music Festival and Tattoo. During its visits to Russia, it has also performed with the Central Navy Band of Russia. It has also performed with units such as the United States Marine Band, the Japan Maritime Self-Defense Force Band and the United States Navy Band.

== Organization ==
The Band, modeled more on the bands of the Royal Marines Band Service, is organized into the main Marching Band and the world-famous Corps of Drums (Tamboers en Pijpers), playing snare drums and fifes. The band is led by the Director of Music, assisted by the Bandmaster and the Drum Major, who leads both formations. The DM also serves as the commander of the Corps of Drums. By tradition, he or she must be a percussionist drummer, either of the band or the Corps of Drums. In concert formation, the marching band is transformed into a Concert Band.

In addition, smaller ensembles can also be formed from the band, such as the following:

- Big Band
- Brass and woodwind chamber ensembles
- Jazz quartet

== Repertoire ==
The band performing during a broadcast on the Liberal Protestant Radio Broadcasting Corporation" (VPRO) in 2010.

The repertoire of the band includes but is not limited to the following foreign and domestic pieces:

- Royal Netherlands Navy Service Marchpast
- Eurovisie Mars
- Europa Mars
- Fanfare Mars
- Hand in hand, Kameraden!, Mars
- Leve de Marine Mars
- March of the Veterans
- Marines' Hymn
- Heart of Oak
- Den Pobedy

== Directors (since 1945) ==
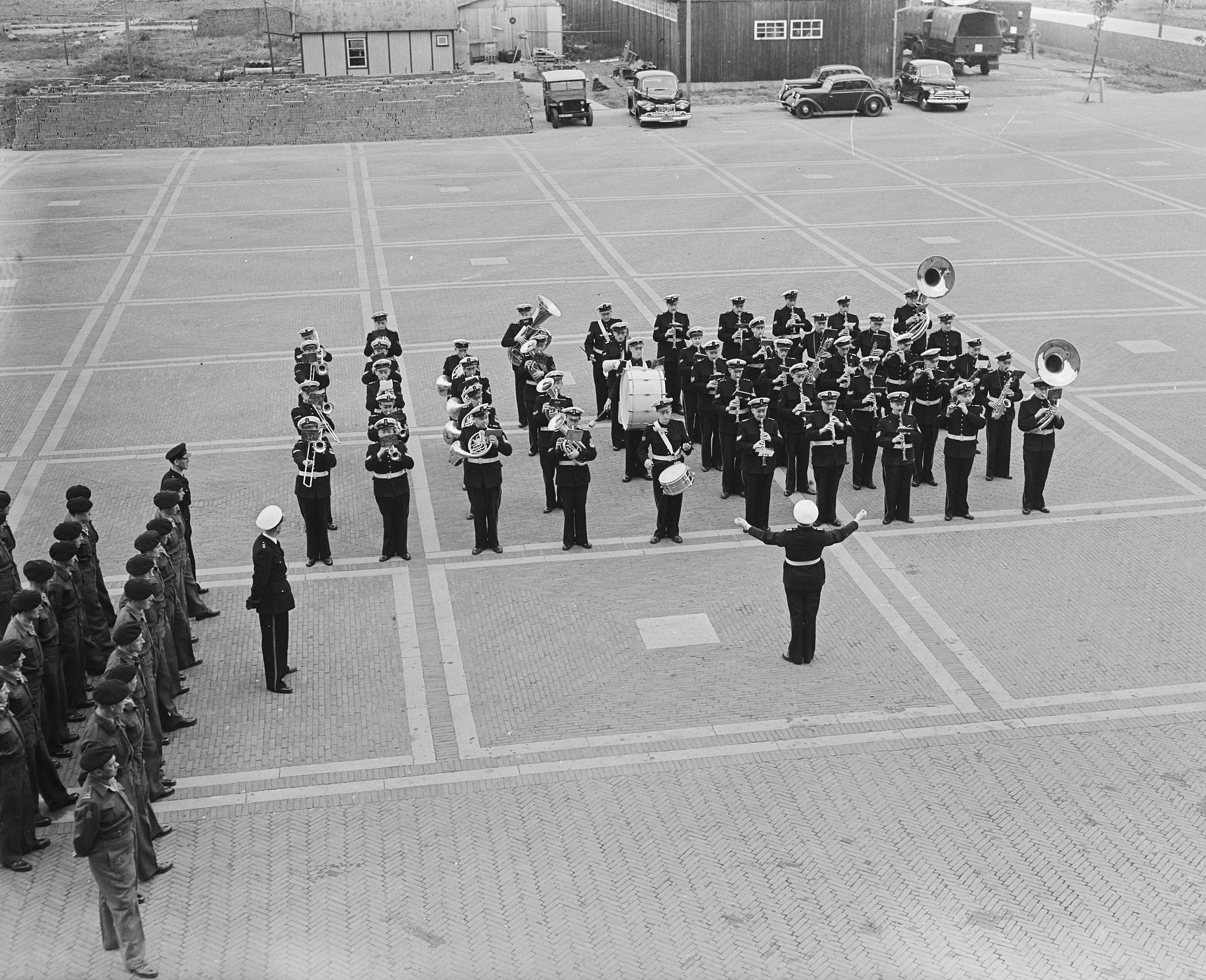
The band in June 1949.

The following people have served as director of the band:

- 1945-1957: Gijsbert Nieuwland
- 1957-1964: Henk Van Lijnschooten
- 1964-1975: Johannes Petrus Laro
- 1975-1986: Jaap Koops
- 1986-1995: Gert Buitenhuis
- 1995-2000: Maurice Hamers
- 2000-2001: Dick Roelofsen
- 2001-2008: Pieter Jansen
- 2008-2009: Dick Roelofsen
- 2009-2013: Harmen Cnossen
- 2013-2017: Peter Kleine Schaars
- 2017–2025: Arjan Tien
- 2025-Present: Erik van de Kolk

== See also ==
- Military band § Netherlands
- Royal Band of the Belgian Guides
- Staff Band of the Bundeswehr
- Luxembourg Military Band
