= Alexei Karabanov =

Military director and musician

1st rank Captain Alexei Karabanov
- Алексе́й Караба́нов
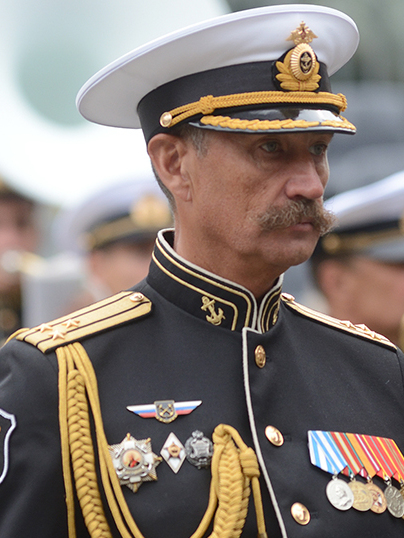
- Born: May 15, 1961 (age 65); Leningrad, RSFSR, Soviet Union
- Military career
- Allegiance: USSR; Russia
- Branch: Russian Navy
- Service years: 1986-Present
- Rank: Captain
- Commands: Admiralty Navy Band of the Leningrad Naval Base (1985–2008); Central Navy Band of Russia (2008-Present)
- Awards: Honored Artist of the Russian Federation (1996)

YouTube information
- Channel: Alexey Karabanov

Alexei Alexeievich Karabanov (Russian: Алексе́й Алексе́евич Караба́нов; born May 15, 1961) is a Russian military musician and director in the Russian Navy. He currently serves as the director of the Central Navy Band of Russia and was the long time director of the Admiralty Navy Band of Russia.

== Biography ==
Karabanov was born in1961 in the northwestern city of Leningrad (now Saint-Petersburg). In 1991, Karabanov received his first invitation to perform at international concerts with the band, with his first tour outside of Russia taking place in Northern France at the Fifth International Festival of Military Music in Lille. Since that time, the band, under Karabanov's leadership, has regularly appeared in festivals and concerts and musical classes in the West, such as his October 1993 visit to Brigham Young University in Utah, where he gave classroom lectures and directed the BYU Bands, including the Cougar Marching Band. It was there where the previously "unknown" original Russian band music by V. Barsegian and Vladimir Malgin was introduced. Nine years later, at HMS Nelson, HMNB Portsmouth, the Royal Marines Band performed a Russian music program under the baton of Commander Karabanov. In 2007, in recognition of his service and talent, the Ministry of Defense promoted Karabanov to the post of Artistic Director and commanding officer of the Central Navy Band of Russia, which is the highest musical position in the Russian Navy. At the same time, he was also promoted to the senior naval rank of Naval Captain.

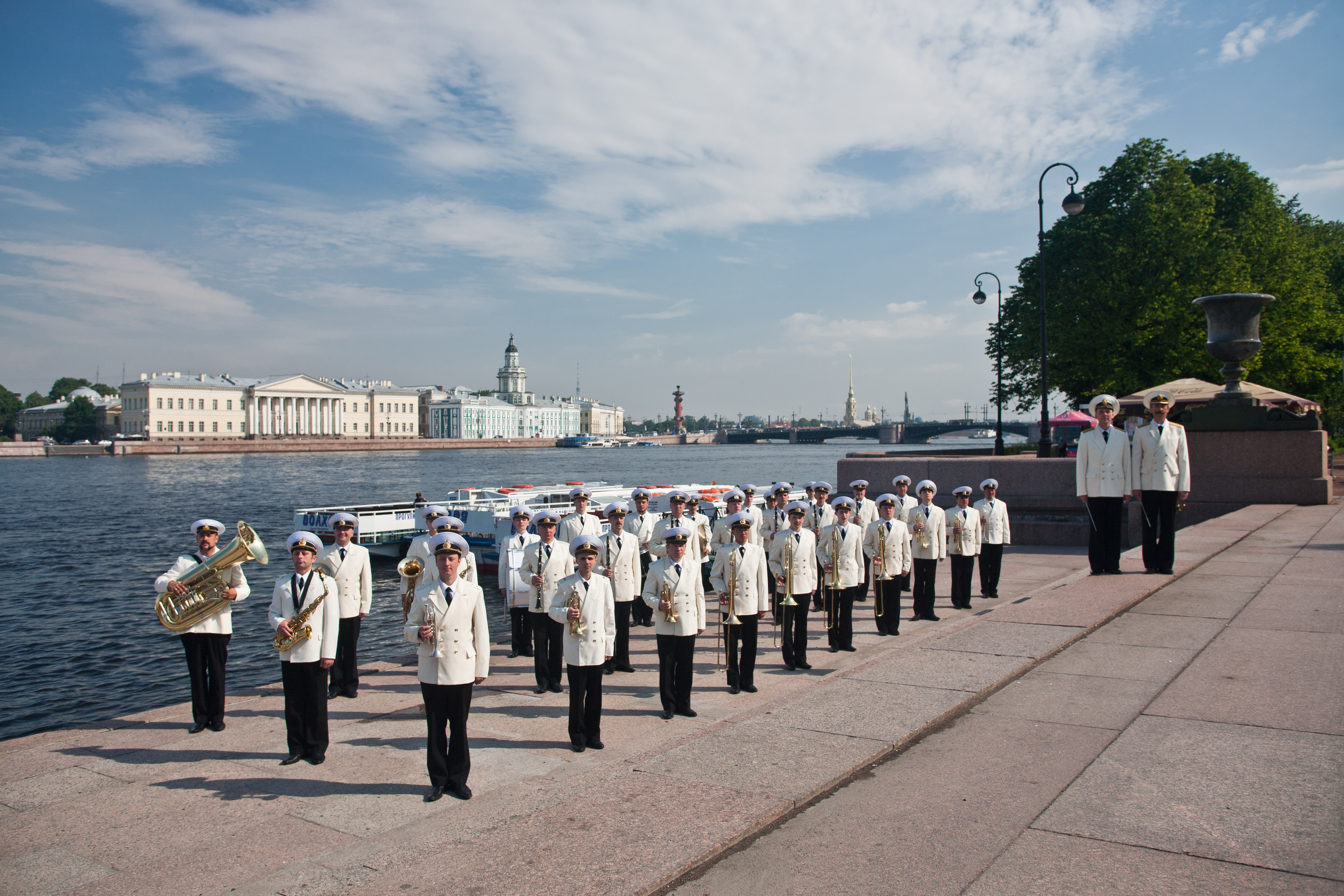
Admiralty Orchestra of the Leningrad Naval Base under the direction of A. Karabanov
