= Central Navy Band of Russia =

Military band unit

Central Navy Band of Russia Центральный оркестр ВМФ России
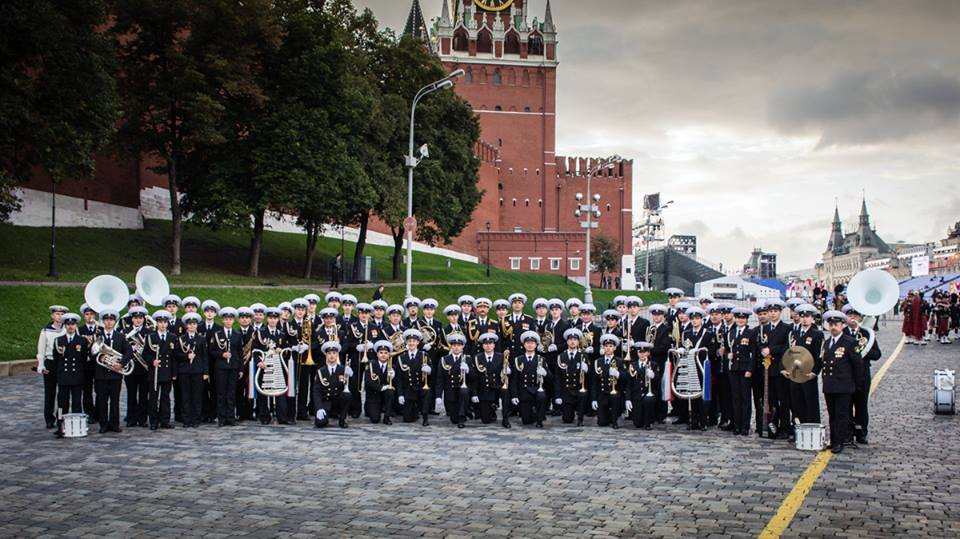
- Members of the Central Navy Band of Russia.
- Active: 23 December 1941; 84 years ago
- Country: Soviet Union; Russia
- Branch: Soviet Navy; Russian Navy
- Type: Military band
- Role: Ceremonial duties
- Part of: Military Band Service of the Armed Forces of Russia
- Headquarters: Moscow
- Nickname: CCB-RN (ЦКОО-ВМФ)
- Patron: Nikolai Rimsky-Korsakov
- Colors: Blue, White
- March: "Экипаж—Одна семья" ("The Crew—One Family")

Commanders
- Conductor: 1st rank Captain Alexei Karabanov
- Band Drum Major: Major (NI) Roman Plotnikov
- Notable commanders: Colonel Georgy Petrovich Alyavdin (1953-1970)

Insignia
- Collar insignia

The Central Exemplary Concert Band of the Russian Navy "Nikolai Rimsky-Korsakov" (Russian:Центральный концертный образцовый оркестр ВМФ им. Н.А. Римского-Корсакова), also known as the Central Navy Band of Russia (Russian:Центральный оркестр ВМФ России) is the official music representative of the Russian Navy. It is based in Moscow. The Conductor/Director of Music is Honored Artist of Russia, 1st rank Captain Alexei Karabanov. The central band is the leading creative team of the Russian Navy, which has been performing for more than 70 years.

== History ==
On December 23, 1941, the band of the Ulyanovsky Fleet was formed with 53 Musicians, mostly consisting of sailors, front-line soldiers who came from hospitals. The first appointed military conductor was 1st rank Captain Alexander Karpey-Lazarev. In order to improve the training of the musicians of the bands of the navy (especially the fleet forces and the naval infantry), the band was transformed in October 1944 as a training band unit of the Soviet Navy. In February 1993, in honor of the 150th birthday of Russian composer Nikolai Rimsky-Korsakov, the orchestra was given its current honorary name of the Central Concert Band of the Navy Nikolai Rimsky-Korsakov. In different years, the orchestra has performed during concerts in places such as Afghanistan, Chechnya and Syria. Since 1945, the orchestra has been a constant participant in the Victory Parades on Red Square, and since 2017, it has been the main musical participant in Naval Parades in St. Petersburg.

== Repertoire ==
The following marches are standard for the navy and the central band:

- Slow March of the Guards of the Navy
- To the native shores
- Spring of the 45th March
- March of the Marines
- March of the Nakhimovtsev
- Sailor glory
- Navy Guard
- Navy Parade
- Guarding the sea borders
- Farewell of Slavianka
- Solemn March
- Naval Komsomol
- Fleet March
- Chernomorets

== Gallery ==
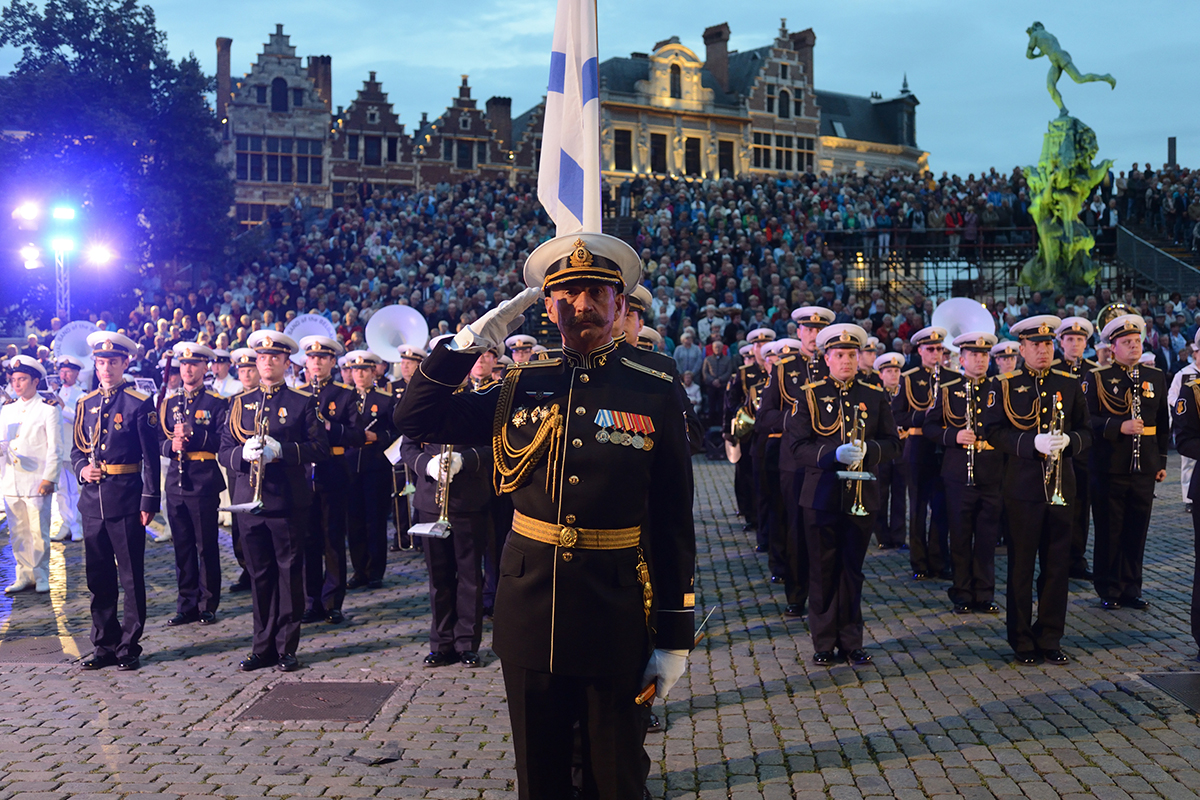
The band in Belgium in September 2018.

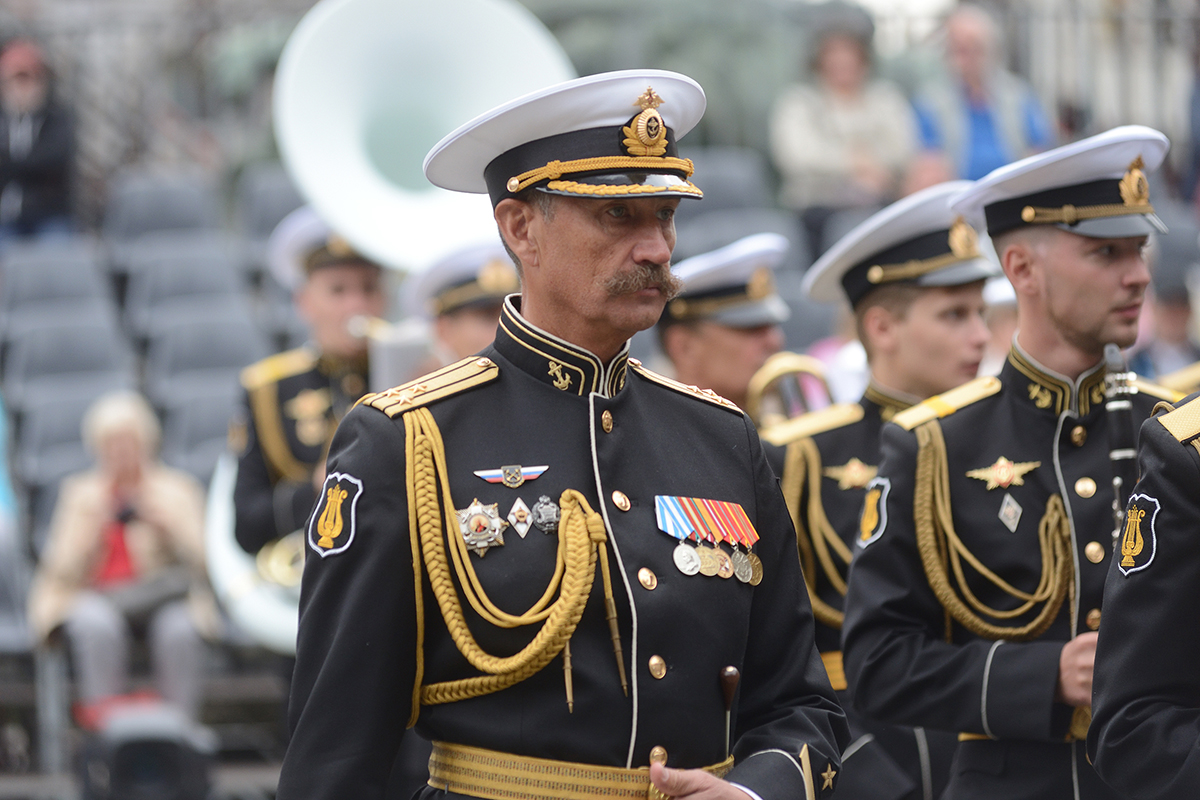
1st rank Captain Alexei Karabanov

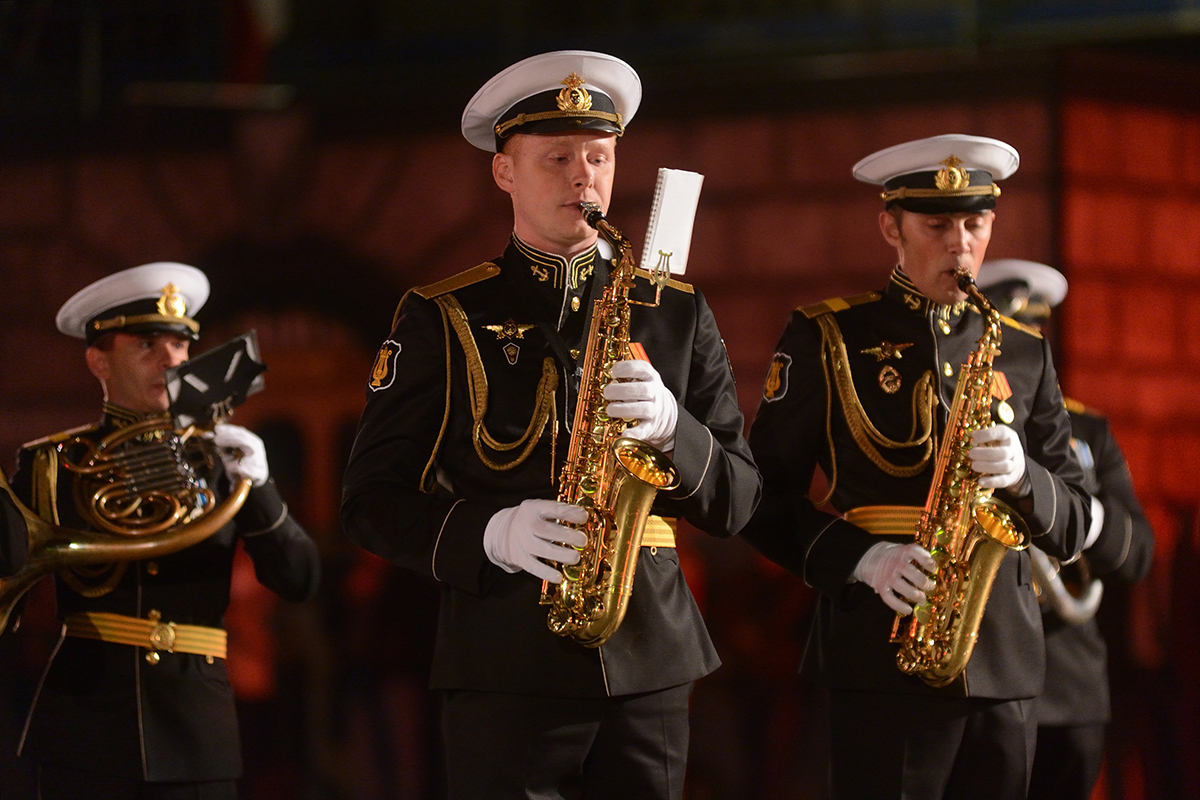

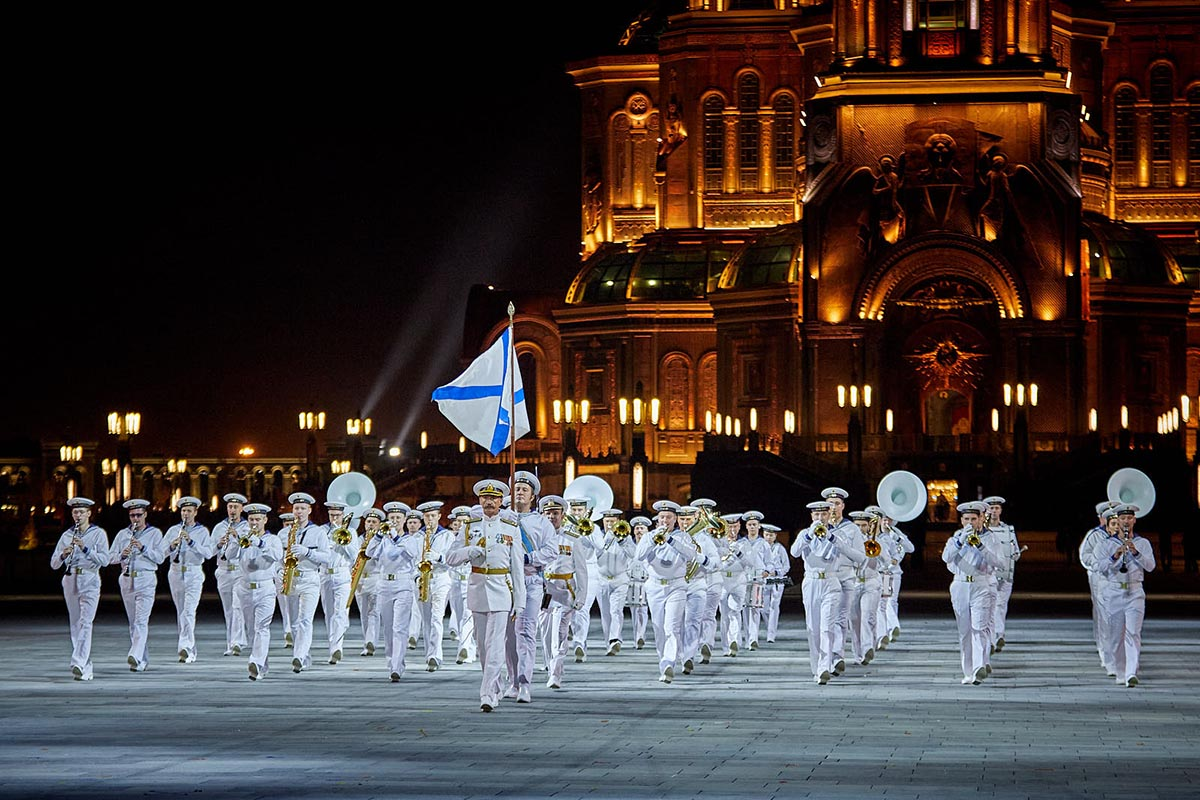
At the Main Cathedral of the Russian Armed Forces

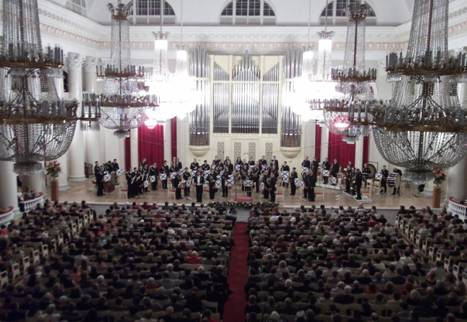
A concert in July 2013
