= Royal Marines Band Service =

- Badge of the Royal Marines
- Active: 1903 to present
- Country: United Kingdom
- Branch: Naval Service
- Type: Military band Secondary: ambulance drivers, chemical decontamination, medical orderlies, and support military combat service support operations (short duration)
- Size: Five Divisions (Bands)
- Part of: Royal Marines
- Garrison/HQ: HMS Excellent
- Nickname: Bandies
- Motto: Per Mare Per Terram (By Sea By Land) (Latin)
- Colours: Blue, Gold, Green, Red, Blue
- March: Quick - A Life on the Ocean Wave; Slow - Preobrajensky
- Anniversaries: 28 Oct 1664 - The Corps' foundation
- Website: Official website

Commanders
- Captain General: King Charles III
- First Sea Lord and Chief of the Naval Staff: General Sir Gwyn Jenkins KCB, OBE, ADC
- Second Sea Lord and Deputy Chief of the Naval Staff: Vice Admiral Sir Martin Connell KCB, CBE
- Commandant General: General Sir Gwyn Jenkins KCB, OBE, ADC
- Deputy Commandant General: Brigadier Neil Sutherland MBE, ADC
- Principal Director of Music Royal Marines: Lieutenant Colonel Huw Williams

The Royal Marines Band Service is the musical wing of the Royal Navy and an independent element of the Royal Marines. It currently consists of five military bands plus a training wing – the Royal Marines School of Music at HMS Nelson – and its headquarters is at HMS Excellent, Whale Island, Portsmouth.

== History ==
The development of music in the Royal Marines is inextricably linked with the evolution of British military bands. Lively airs and the beat of the drum enabled columns of marching men to keep a regular step. The drum was the normal method of giving signals on the battlefield or in camp. As long ago as the days of Drake and Hawkins the drummer's rhythm would advertise the changing watches or beat the men to quarters. Royal Marine Drummers were first mentioned in the 1664 Convening Order, at the formation of Corps and so pride themselves as being the oldest Branch in the Corps.

Without doubt, groups of musicians existed in the Service before 1767, when Royal Marines Divisional Bands were formed at the naval dockyard-bases of Chatham, Plymouth and Portsmouth and the naval gathering-point of Deal in the Downs, and Marine bands (along with professional bands paid for by captains) plus their respective corps of drums provided music on board ships before and during battles of the Napoleonic Wars (e.g. during the long sail into action at the Battle of Trafalgar). The modern history of the Service, though, begins late in the 19th century, when the task of forming a Royal Naval School of Music to provide Bands for the Royal Navy was assigned to the Marines, with the school being founded in 1903. From then on the Band Service became an integral part of the Corps. Its original home was Eastney Barracks, Portsmouth; where it remained until 1930 when it was transferred to the Royal Marine Depot, Deal.

== Second World War ==
By the end of the Second World War, 225 musicians and buglers had been killed in action, which was a quarter of their strength at the time, and the highest percentage of any branch of any service, after Bomber Command. After the outbreak of the Second World War, the service moved to Malvern, then divided with the Junior Wing moving to the Isle of Man and the Senior Wing to Scarborough.

== Post Second World War ==
The bands reunited at Bradwell Grove camp, near Burford, Oxfordshire in March 1946 and finally returned to Deal in early 1950 under the supervision of the Commandant of the Royal Marine School of Music, Brigadier Roy Smith-Hill.

The amalgamation of the Divisional Bands with the Royal Naval School of Music to form today's Royal Marines Band Service, also took place in 1950 when the headquarters and training establishment were renamed the Royal Marines School of Music.

The Band Service are notable for performing the theme music from Gerry Anderson's successful 1965 TV series Thunderbirds in the final scene from the 1966 film Thunderbirds Are Go. The band performed the music on the parade ground of the Royal Marines Depot, Deal, where they marched under the leadership of their Senior Drum Major Charles H. Bowden. This sequence was synchronized with the end credits of the film, with the very last scene of this shot (and indeed, the whole film) showing the band standing in a large representation of the words 'THE END'.

== Deal bombing ==
At approximately 8.20 am on 22 September 1989, the Royal Marines School of Music at the Royal Marine Depot, Deal was bombed by the IRA; this resulted in the death of eleven Royal Marines Musicians - Musn Mick Ball, B/Cpl John (Andy) Cleatheroe, B/Cpl Trevor Davis, Musn Richard Fice, Musn Richard (Taff) Jones, B/Cpl Dave McMillan, Musn Chris Nolan, B/Cpl Dean Pavey, Musn Mark Petch, Musn Tim Reeves and Musn Bob Simmonds plus the injury of 22 other Royal Marine Band Service members. A memorial garden is now situated in the grounds of the old barracks where the bomb went off. This was built in remembrance of the eleven who died and was restored after an arson attack some years later. Every year the families and friends of those that died join together at the garden to pay their respects and lay flowers in a memorial service. The Bandstand near the Walmer Lifeboat station is also dedicated to those who died in the bombing, with the names of those killed engraved on each face. Each July a Royal Marines Band returns to perform an outdoor concert in it.

== Modern era ==
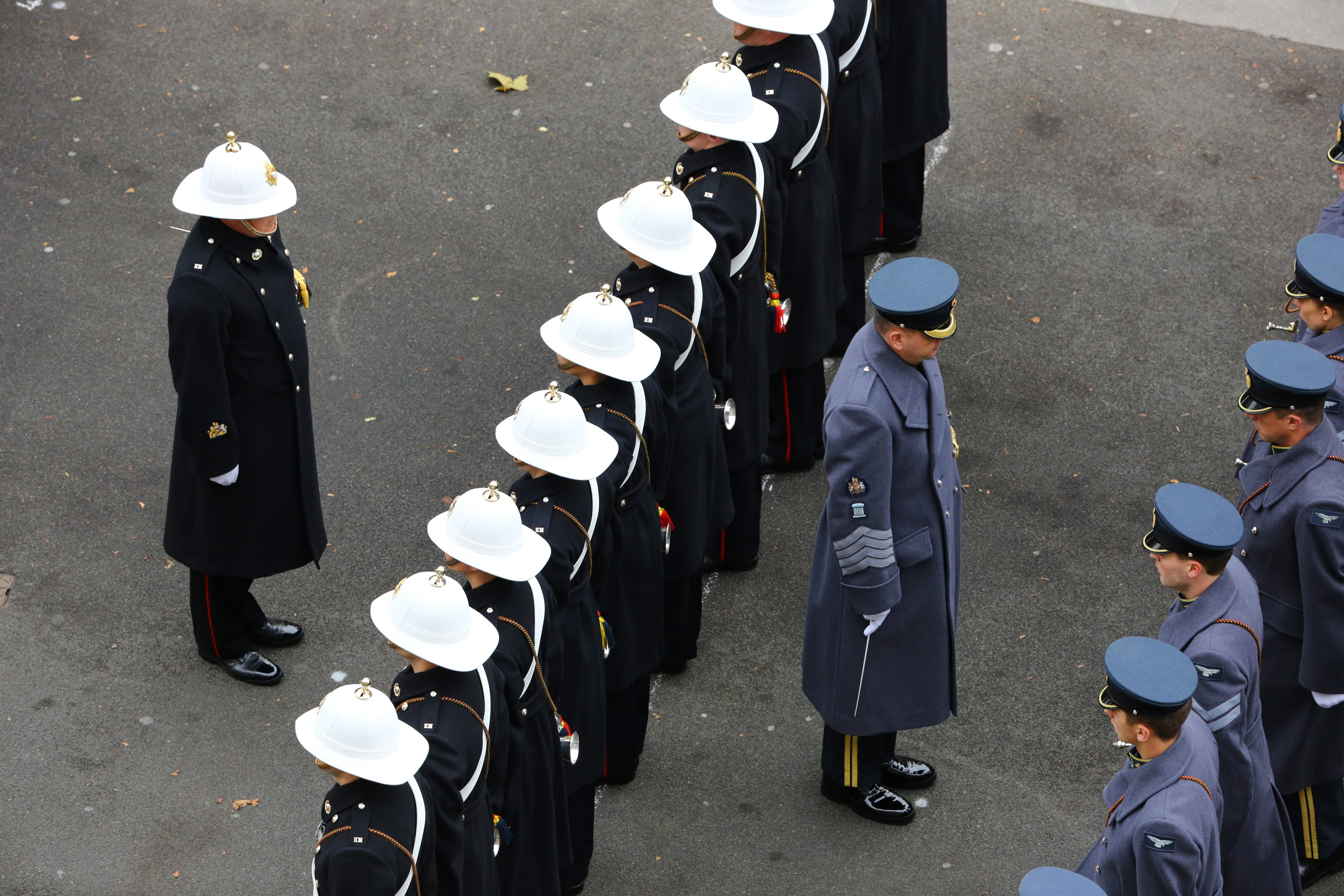
Buglers in greatcoats during the 2015 Remembrance Day Service at the Cenotaph, London.

In 1992 the band was opened to women when the Royal Navy began to fully integrate women (who were then members of a separate branch) into the service. In April 1996, the School of Music was moved to Portsmouth dockyard when the Deal Barracks were closed. It was initially housed at the former Royal Naval Detention Quarters — the cells were converted to individual practice rooms.

Band of HM Royal Marines HMS Collingwood were present on the Isle of Man for the Tynwald Day ceremony on Monday 6 July 2015.

The Bands of HM Royal Marines participate in various annual events such as the Royal British Legion's Festival of Remembrance, the Remembrance Day Service at the Cenotaph, the Lord Mayor's Show as well as accompanying Royal Navy and Royal Marines contingents at guard mounting duties in London.

Furthermore, the Massed Bands, numbering some two hundred musicians from normally at least three Royal Marines bands, perform their Beating Retreat ceremony every two years at London's Horse Guards Parade in celebration of the birthday of their Captain General (currently Charles III). Because of its popularity, it is generally over three nights. The most recent events were in June 2012 in honour of the Queen's Diamond Jubilee, in June 2014 in honour of the RM's 350 years of service to the nation and also the first to feature a guard of honour company from 40 Commando Brigade and bands from the United States Marine Corps and the Netherlands Marine Corps, and in June 2016, also marking the 90th birthday of HM the Queen and the first to be streamed live on Facebook. The latest event was slated for a May 2018 date, marking the 65th anniversary of the 1953 Coronation of HM the Queen and will be followed by another in 2022, marking the milestone 70th anniversary since the assumption to the throne of HM the Queen and the centennial of the modern Royal Marines (due to the COVID-19 pandemic, the 2020 event was cancelled).

Another event hosted by the Royal Marines Band Service is the Mountbatten Festival of Music, named after former Life Colonel Commandant Royal Marines Admiral of the Fleet The Earl Mountbatten of Burma, which takes place every year in the Royal Albert Hall.

== Present organisation ==
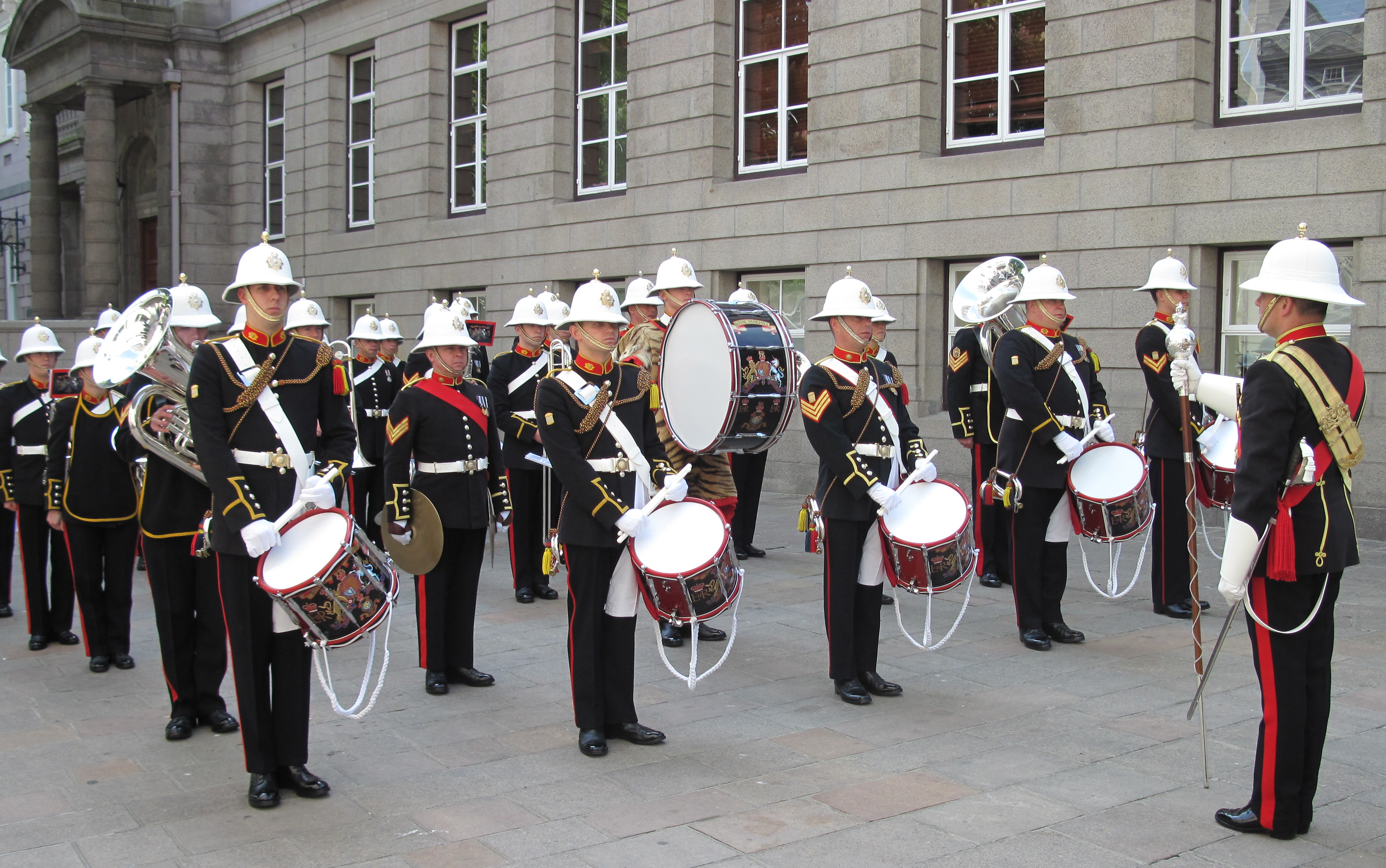
Royal Marines Band in Jersey, 2010.

At present, there are a total of five Royal Marine Bands and attached Corps of Drums:

- Band of HM Royal Marines, Portsmouth (The Royal Band) (HMS Nelson)
- Band of HM Royal Marines, Plymouth (HMS Raleigh)
- Band of HM Royal Marines, Scotland, Rosyth (HMS Caledonia)
- Band of HM Royal Marines, HMS Collingwood (replacing the Band of Britannia Royal Naval College)
- Band of HM Royal Marines, Commando Training Centre Royal Marines

The Band of the Royal Marines School of Music in Portsmouth (The Training Band) brings the total number to six.

== Officers and Bandmasters ==
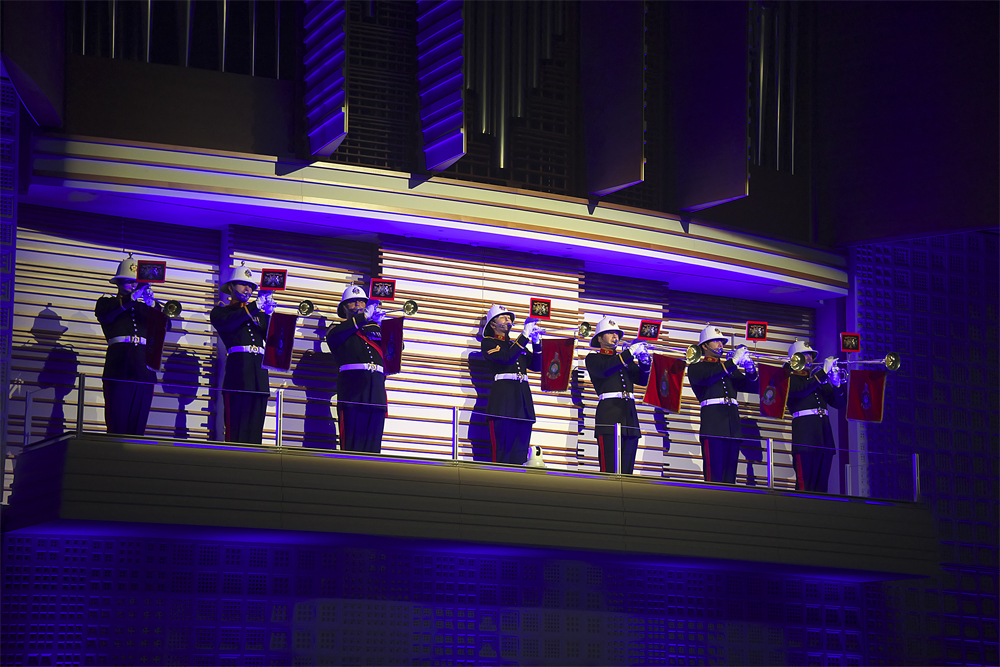
World Band Festival Luzern in 2012

All Directors of Music are Commissioned Officers, who are commissioned from within the ranks of the RMBS (there are no direct entry officers in the RMBS), on completion of the 12 month Bandmasters' Course (at RMSoM in Portsmouth) and once they have passed the external LRSM directing exam. Once commissioned they attend a music college for a period of one to two years, to study advanced conducting; usually at the level of MMus. Officers in command of Bands are either a Captain or Major, with the senior position of Principal Director of Music being a Lieutenant Colonel. Each Band also has a Warrant Officer Class 2 Bandmaster who acts as the Band Manager and deputy conductor. There are also four Warrant Officer Class 1 Bandmasters, in positions such as Bandmaster/Chief Instructor at the School of Music and PRO. The senior Bandmaster is a WO1 who holds the appointment of 'Corps Bandmaster' and is the chief non-commissioned advisor to the Principal Director of Music on all matters music and personnel.

== Corps of Drums ==
The bands are always led by 'buglers', who are trained on both the side drum and the bugle as well as the Herald Fanfare Trumpet (natural trumpet); this section of the band is referred to as "the Corps of Drums", which since 1903 is now situated at the front of the band. Whilst similar to army corps of drums, these are members of the Royal Marines Band Service, although they retain their own rank structure. RM Buglers have a similar history to Army 'drummers' in that they were used to convey orders on a ship on drums and bugles, and would then mass onshore into corps of drums, though they were still expected to work as individual soldiers, also known in slang by the Royal Navy as drummers. These drummer-buglers trace themselves back to the raising of the Royal Marines in 1664 as a maritime foot regiment, with six drummers attached to its battalions, making them the oldest specialisation in the Royal Marines. Today's buglers carry out duties ranging from repatriation services (sounding Last Post bugle call), mess beatings (drum displays), beating retreat (marching displays) and concerts on behalf of the Royal Marines and the entire Royal Navy.

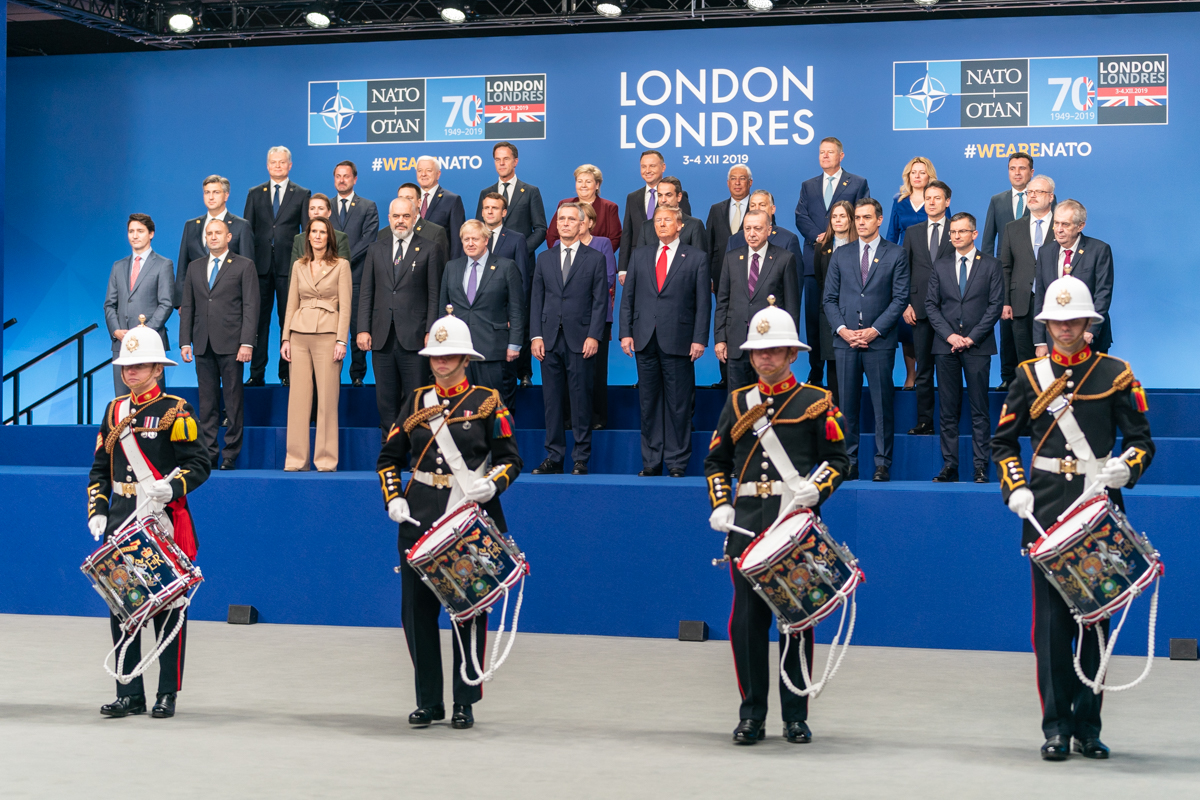
The Corps of Drums from the Band of HM Royal Marines Collingwood performing a drum display during the 2019 London summit.

=== Instruments and leadership ===
Like the British Army, Military snare (side) drums (MSD) are the principal instrument of the corps of drums; with the bugle being another core instrument. Bass drums are often used during parades and drum displays, while cymbals and single tenor drums are used during parades and ceremonies only. Bass drummers, cymbalists and tenor drummers on parade however, are for the most time percussionist, not buglers. Herald Fanfare trumpets (natural trumpets) are also performed on such occasions where a bugle fanfare would be inappropriate for such. The corps is led by a drum major and a bugle major serves as the principal player for it. The Corps Bugle Major and Corps Drum Major have specific ceremonial roles within the RMBS. The Warrant Officer Class 1 rank also acts as the specialist advisor for all RM Buglers in addition to the current Corps appointment they hold at that time. Currently (2026) the Corps Drum Major of the Royal Marines holds the WO1 rank, but the predecessor held the Corps Bugle Major appointment (WO1 from 2022 - 2024.)

=== Drum major ===
A drum major holds the rank of Sergeant Bugler, Colour Sergeant Bugler, or warrant officer class 2. "Drum Major" is not a rank itself but an appointment. The Corps Drum Major RM, the most senior drum major in the Royal Marines, can hold the rank of warrant officer class 1 or 2, depending on the current structure of the Corps of Drums. Drum majors in the Royal Marines are now always drawn from the buglers branch and always started their careers as a bugler and are required to have passed a number of courses in music, military skills, and leadership throughout their military careers before being considered for an appointment as a drum major. They are responsible for band ceremony, discipline and administration.

The insignia of appointment is four point-up chevrons worn on a wrist-strap whilst in shirt-sleeve order, or four large point-up chevrons worn on the uniform sleeve, surmounted by a drum. Royal Marines drum majors do not wear any additional badges to indicate specific rank. In addition to the drum major sash, the uniform features hussar style braiding across the front of the tunic.

=== Bugle major ===
During the 1850s the bugle became the main means of signalling and Bugle Majors were appointed to assist the Drum Major. Initially the Royal Marine Artillery had a Trumpet Major but this appointment was replaced by Bugle Major when the artillery trumpet was superseded by the bugle. However, RMA Buglers continued to wear the crossed trumpets badge on their sleeve. During this period the RMA was unique in having a Divisional bugle-call and a Divisional trumpet-call. During 1922, Drum Major and Bugle Major appointments were confirmed at Colour-Sergeant rank with one of each at all Divisions and the Depot, Deal. The Bugle Major was instructed to further assist the Drum Major whilst retaining responsibility for instruction in fife and bugle. They both had the status and pay of Sergeant from 1810. In 1881 they became Staff Sergeant and were entitled to wear a sword, which they still retain. The Bugle Major, who wears the narrow red welt of the Buglers Branch, is responsible for the military side drum, bugle and herald trumpet training of buglers.

The Corps Bugle Major is an appointment for the most senior bugle major in the Royal Marines, holding the rank of warrant officer class 1 or 2. The insignia of appointment is four point-up chevron worn on a wrist-strap whilst in shirt-sleeve order, or four large point-up chevrons worn on the uniform sleeve, surmounted by a bugle.

== Ranks, insignia and uniform ==
Collar badge as worn by Band Corporals and Corporal Buglers and below on Full Dress Uniform

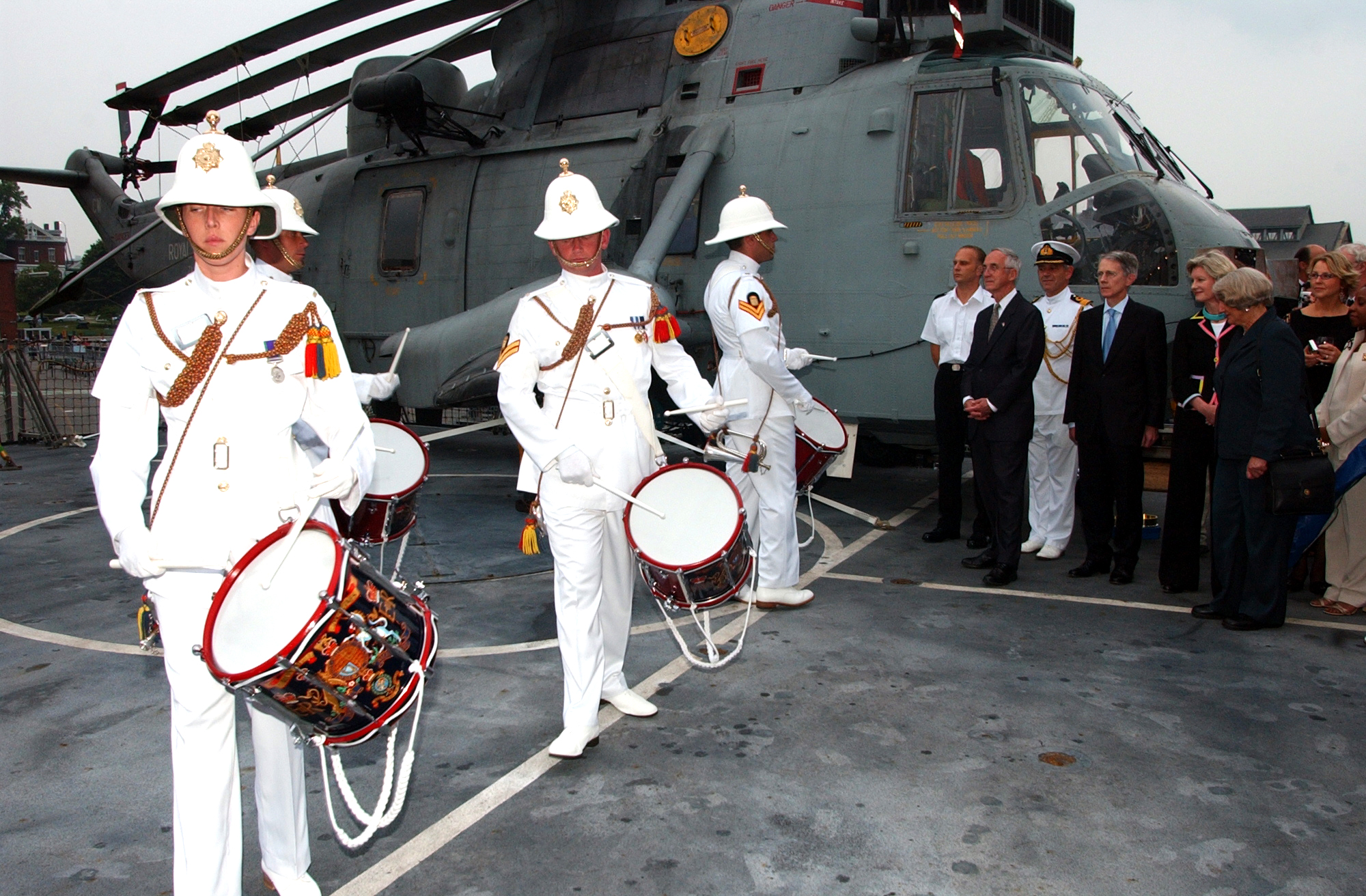
The white hot-weather dress of the Band Service in 2004.

The Royal Marines ranking structure is used, with "band" prefixed to the rank (e.g. Band Corporal, abbreviated BdCpl); as with other bands of the British Armed Forces, the rank of Private is replaced with Musician. The term "bugler" suffixed is used for members from the corps of drums (e.g. Corporal Bugler, abbreviated Cpl Bugler).

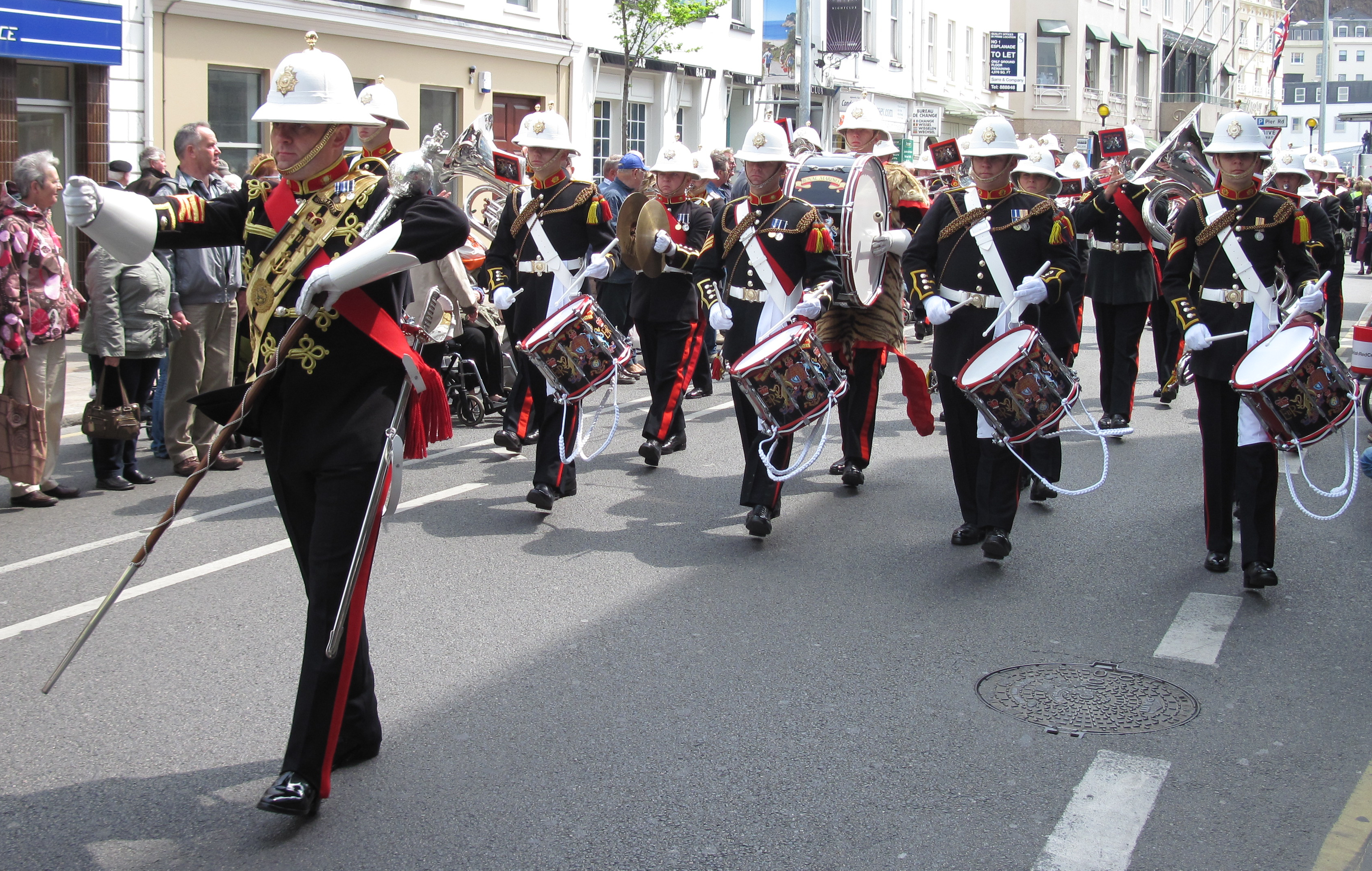
RMBS personnel wearing Number 1 Full Dress. The distinctive braiding of a drum major's tunic is visible at the front.

They wear the same badges of rank as other Royal Marines but wear a "Royal Marines Band Service" badge in place of the commando flash and other Band Service insignia indicating their status as musicians. Members also wear the navy blue beret with a scarlet patch behind the badge, that is also worn by other personnel who have not passed the commando course. The Portsmouth band and CTCRM band have different cap badges from the rest of the Corps. Portsmouth Band ranks also wear different shoulder flashes from other members of the RMBS, instead wearing a 'Royal Band' flash on the right shoulder. This is a privilege bestowed on them by Queen Elizabeth II on the de-commissioning of the Royal Yacht, on which they wore the flash 'Royal Yacht'.

The Royal Marines Band Service is the only element of the Corps of Royal Marines to wear Number 1 Full Dress based on the Royal Marines Dress Uniform worn from 1922 to 1939. The simpler Number 1A dress or "blues" are worn by other Royal Marine units on ceremonial duties. Full Dress consists of a royal blue single-breasted tunic with red facings (with gold piping) and yellow cuff slashes. Royal blue trousers with a scarlet stripe and a white "Wolseley pattern" pith helmet are also worn. The helmet's decoration includes a brass ball ornament at the top (a detail inherited from the Royal Marine Artillery), helmet plate and chin chain. Buglers wear dress cords and also have thinner trouser stripes to indicate their status.

== Royal Marines School of Music ==
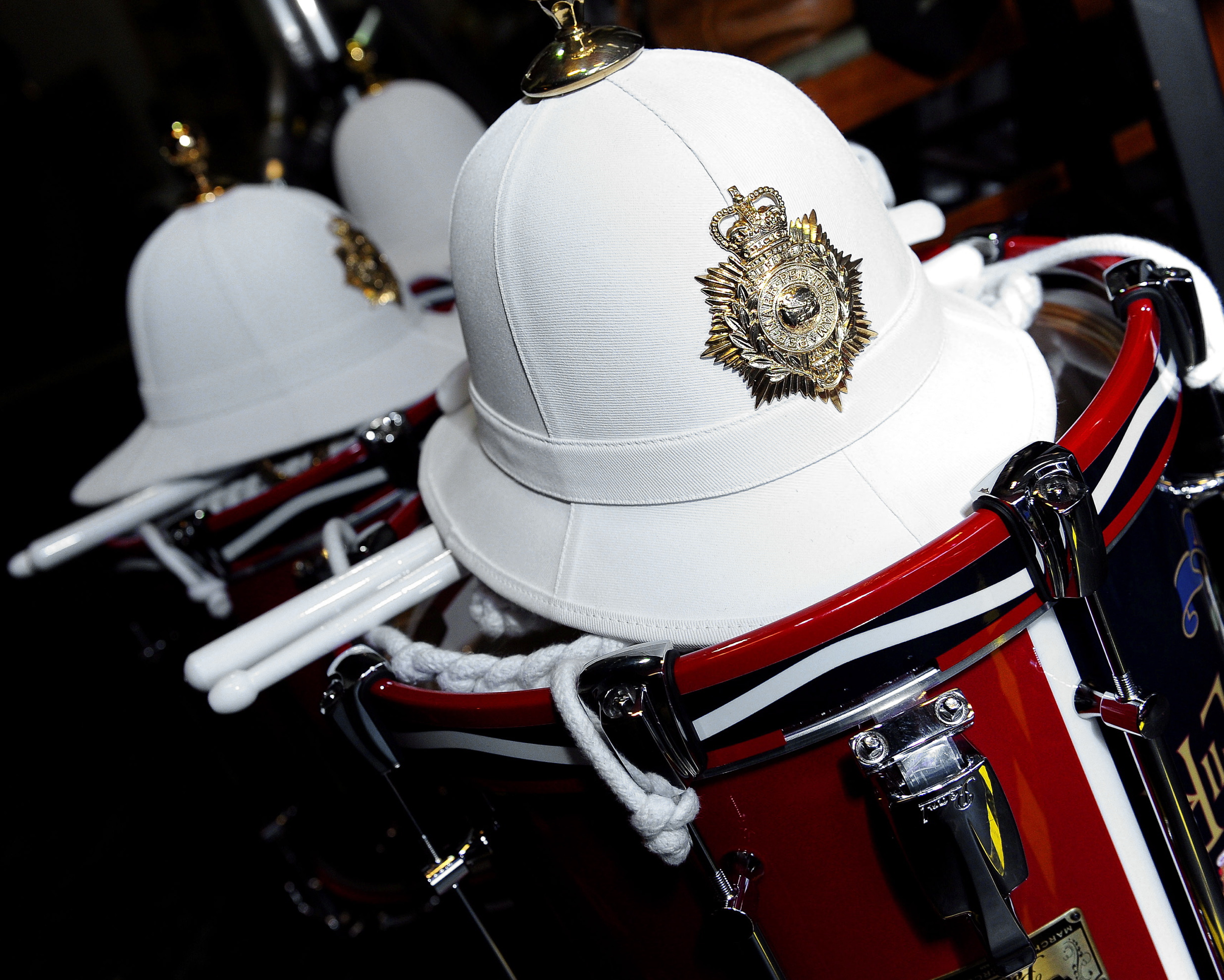
Wolseley pattern helmet and side drums of the Royal Marines Band Service.

The Royal Marines School of Music (RMSoM) was founded as the "Royal Naval School of Music" in 1903 at Eastney Barracks, Portsmouth, where the Royal Marines Museum is now located. In 1930 it moved to Deal, Kent, a historic Royal Navy base and shipyard. Between 1940 and 1950, it moved to various locations around the country before returning to Deal. Eleven band members at the school were killed during the Deal barracks bombing of 1989. The school relocated for the last time in 1996 and returned to Portsmouth, making its home in the former detention quarters within HMS Nelson.

Today all Royal Marines Bands are required to provide a range of musical ensembles, including wind bands, orchestras, quartets and dance bands, and traditional Military (parade) Bands. To achieve this, all Royal Marines musicians, except solo specialists, are required to attain an above-average standard on both a string and a wind instrument. The Solo Specialists need to become highly talented on their chosen single instrument. The Corps of Drums receives equal training, with an emphasis on drill, bugling and drumming.

After completing 15 weeks of initial military training, now mostly held at the Commando Training Centre Royal Marines, and passing the audition, musicians proceed to train at the RMSoM. Musicians train for a maximum of 3 years and buglers train for 2 years. RMSoM has a collaborative agreement with Plymouth University through which musicians may obtain a BMus degree. More experienced musicians have an opportunity to obtain a master's degree and other civilian certifications through external providers.

As their careers progress, Musicians and Buglers may return to the Royal Marines School of Music to undergo further musical training to qualify them for higher rank, after passing the Junior Command Course (to become Band Corporal) and Senior Command Course (to become Band Sergeant). This culminates in a possible place on the Bandmasters' Course that is widely recognized as one of the most demanding courses of its type, lasting 12 months.

Bandmaster Students study all the main music disciplines; the orchestral and contemporary wind band repertoire and they work with renowned figures from the world of music.

== Military role ==
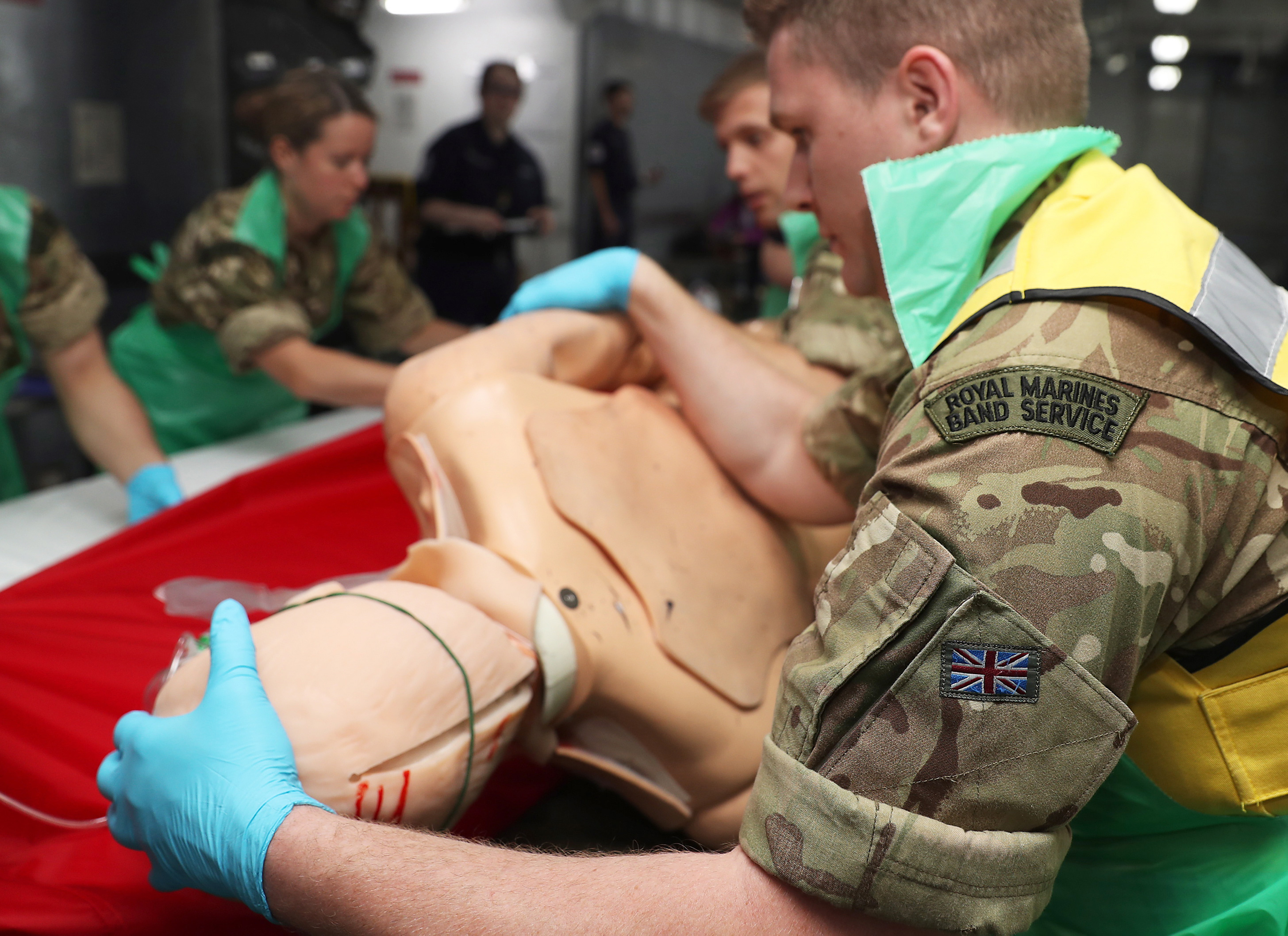
Members of the Royal Marines Band Service during medical training. Also visible is the "Royal Marines Band Service" badge worn in place of the "Royal Marines Commando" flash, on the shoulder.

In addition to music making, Royal Marines Musicians and Buglers are fully trained and operational military personnel and usually perform support duties such as medical support, driving ambulances and logistics. Additionally they may also provide entertainment for troops deployed overseas and represent the Royal Marines in an ambassadorial role.

Band members have traditionally been deployed on board Royal Navy ships and this custom continued until 1978. Bandsmen saw action during both the First and Second World Wars. By the end of World War II, 225 musicians and buglers had been killed in action, which was a quarter of their strength at the time, and the highest percentage of any branch of any service. Royal Marines Bands were also involved in both the Falklands War and Operation Granby (the 1991 Gulf War) as casualty handlers on various hospital ships.

In 2000, RM Band Service ranks deployed to Kosovo for six months during Operation Agricola supporting 3 Commando Brigade RM. During the firefighters' strike (Operation Fresco) in 2002-03, 150 Band Service ranks were deployed with 'Green Goddesses' to various Temporary Service Fire Stations around the UK. Despite this, the annual Mountbatten Festival of Music went ahead in 2003 although with very reduced numbers. In the early part of 2003, 39 Band Service ranks deployed with the Primary Casualty Receiving Facility on RFA Argus providing casualty handlers and a further 26 ranks deployed with 3 Commando Brigade as decontamination teams during Operation Telic (the Iraq War). Sunday 1 April 2007 marked a significant milestone for the Royal Marines Band Service as they took over the duties as the Cyprus Reinforcement Unit for two months. Ninety ranks deployed. This was the first time in the history of the Royal Marines Band Service that Musicians and Buglers had been deployed in company strength as an independent military unit to perform their secondary role. Also in 2006/2007 (Operation Herrick V, Operation Herrick order of battle), two Royal Marine Buglers took part in operations in Afghanistan with 3 Commando Brigade where they assisted the Medical Squadron of the Commando Logistic Regiment, as well as providing musical support for repatriation ceremonies. Another 38 deployed to Afghanistan again in 2008/9 with 3 Commando Brigade as ambulance and general duties drivers. Royal Marines Bands continue to fly the flag abroad with many prestigious engagements undertaken including the 60th Anniversary of D-Day, in Gibraltar, the USA, Europe and Australia.

Band members train in CBRN defense casualty treatment. In 2018 they participated in the annual chemical warfare exercise on Salisbury Plain involving over 300 military personnel, along with 40 Commando, the RAF Regiment and the Defence CBRN Centre.

== Royal Naval Volunteer Bands ==
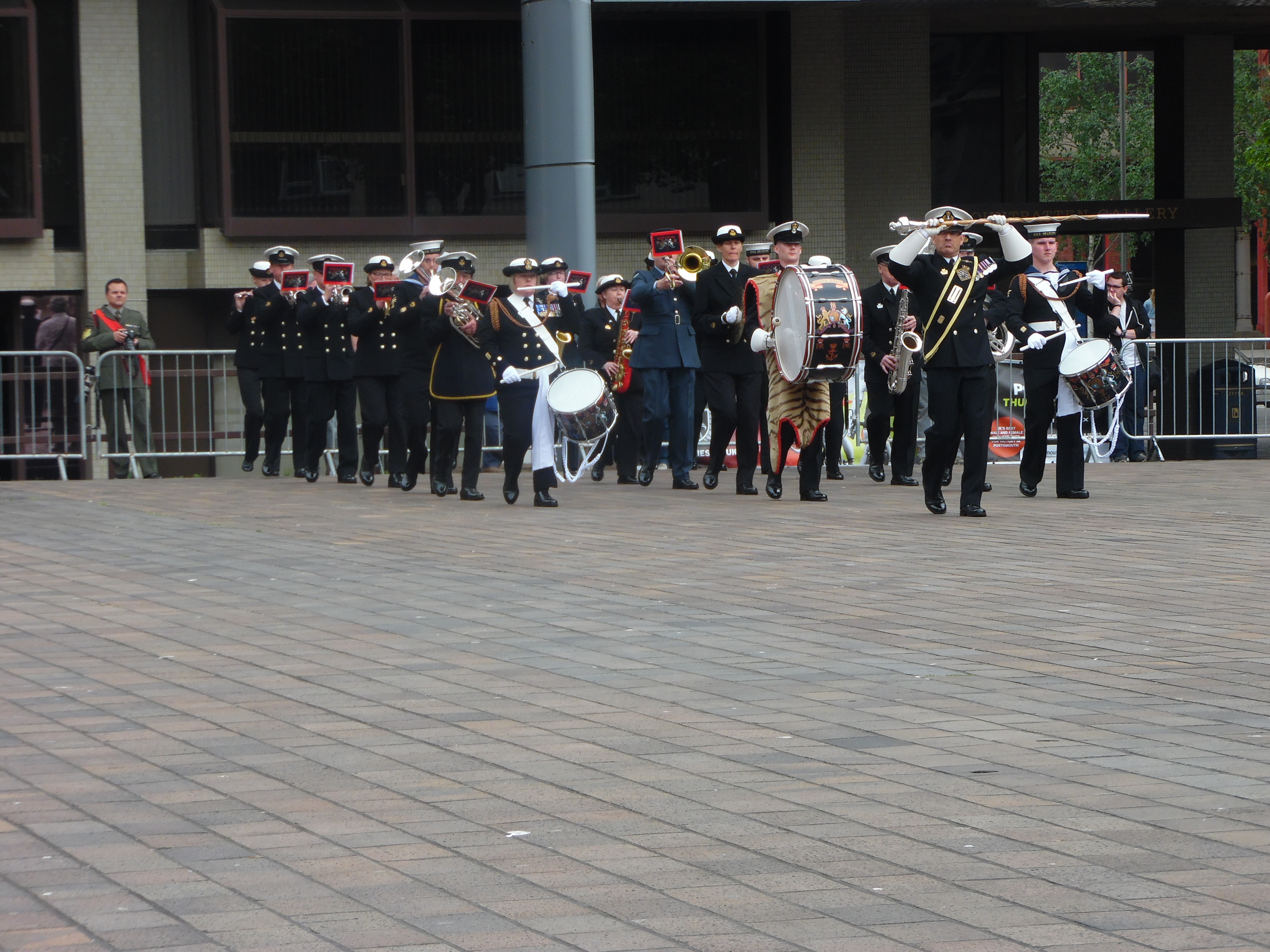
HMS Seahawk Volunteer Band at the 2016 Royal Navy Volunteer Band Association Festival at the Portsmouth Guildhall

The Royal Naval Volunteer Bands are not part of the RMBS, these bands are assigned in various Royal Navy installations all over the UK and are staffed by a wide variety of volunteer Military Musicians. They come from many walks of life: serving or retired members of any of the Crown Services, retired military Bandsmen or civilian personnel who wish to help and support the Armed Forces. It is a uniformed organisation wearing a "rig" similar to a Royal Naval Senior Rating, or the uniform of their parent service. Bands are run by a Volunteer Band Instructor, the conductor of the Band, in charge of Music and a Volunteer Band Officer, a member who is serving above the rank of Warrant Officer.

Bands are located at:

- HMS Seahawk
- HMS Drake
- BRNC Dartmouth
- HMS Heron
- HMS Collingwood
- HMS Sultan
- HMS Nelson
- Northwood Headquarters
- HMS Neptune

== Key personnel ==
- Principal Director of Music Royal Marines: Lieutenant Colonel Huw Williams RM
- Corps Bandmaster: WO1 Bdmr Mike "Ratty" Robinson RM
- Corps Bugle Major: WO2 Neil Lowe RM
- Corps Drum Major: WO1 Chris Mace MVO RM

== Gallery ==
Sleeve buttons on Full Dress Uniform

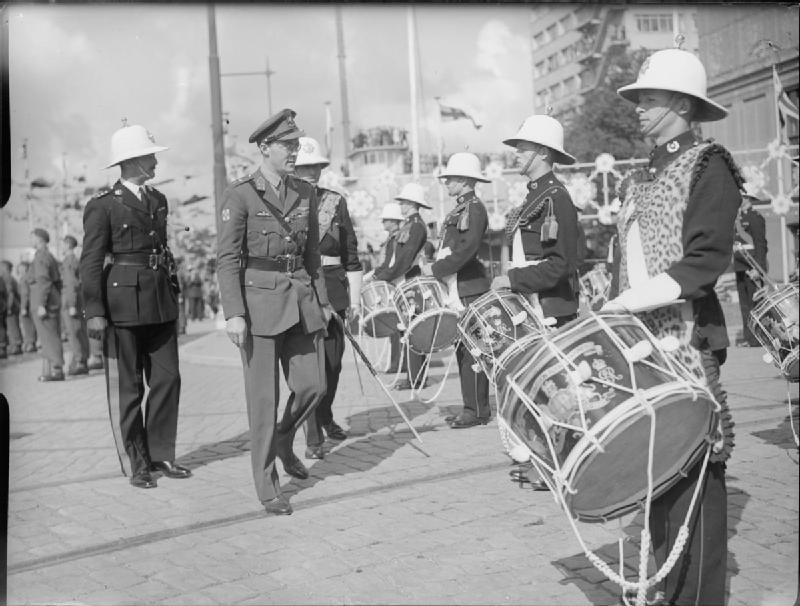
Prince Bernhard of the Netherlands inspecting the Royal Marine Band (Portsmouth Division) during the opening of an Allied Naval Exhibition in Rotterdam, 1945.

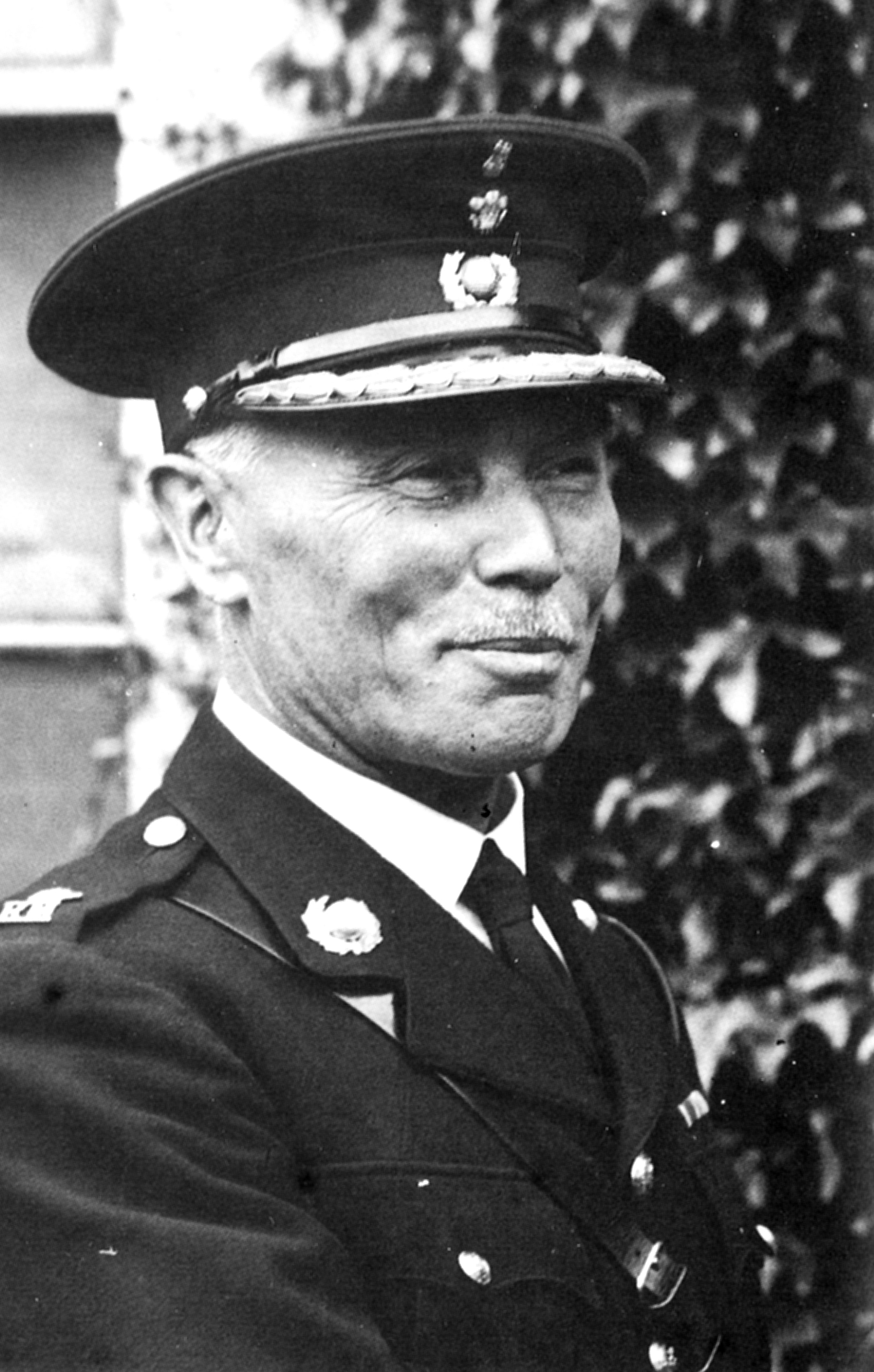
Royal Marines Director of Music Frederick Ricketts a.k.a. Kenneth J. Alford.

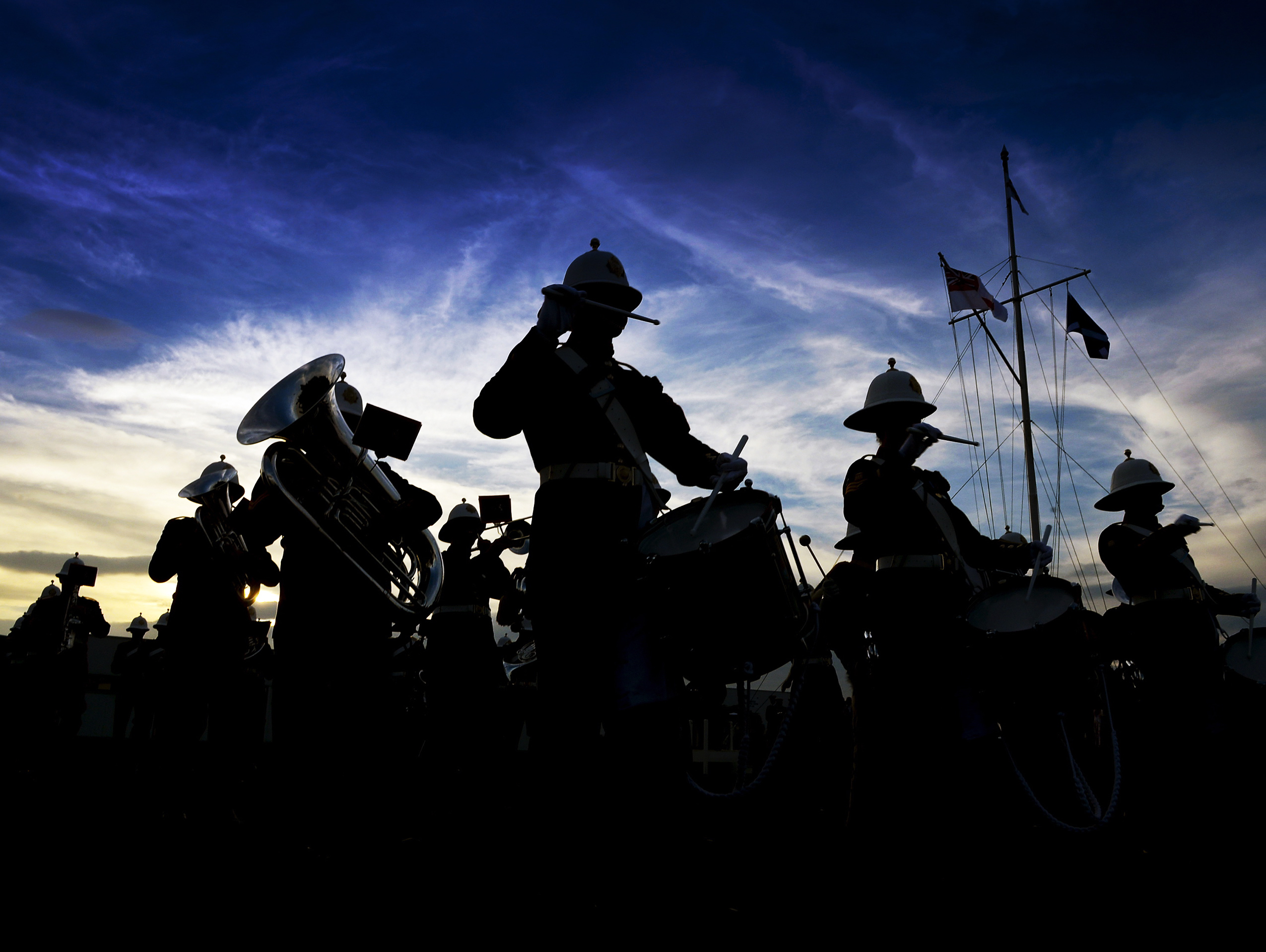
The Band of HM Royal Marines Scotland performing at a ceremony in Rosyth, Scotland.

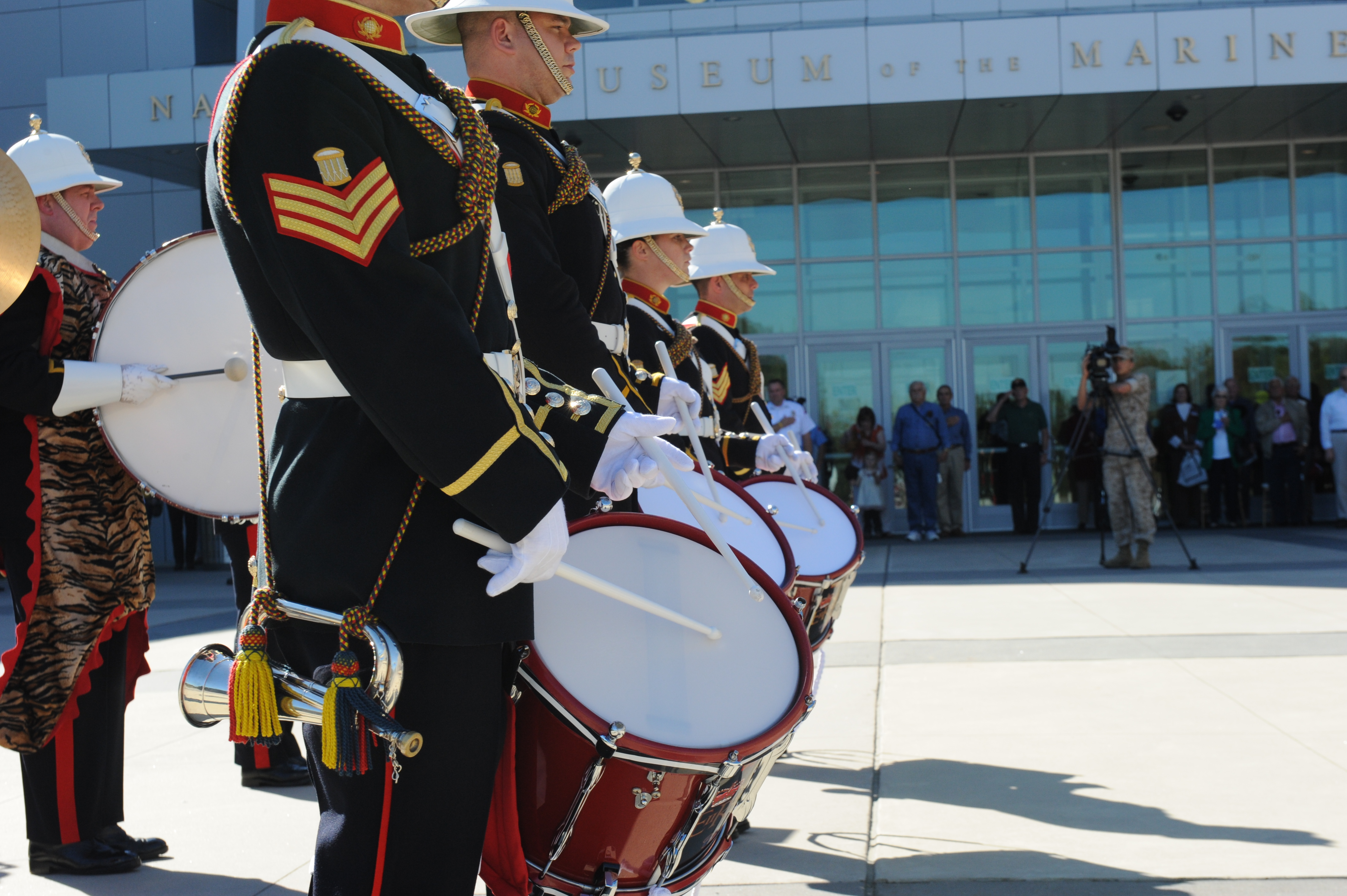
Closeup of buglers from the Band of HM Royal Marines Scotland performing in front of the National Museum of the Marine Corps, 2009.

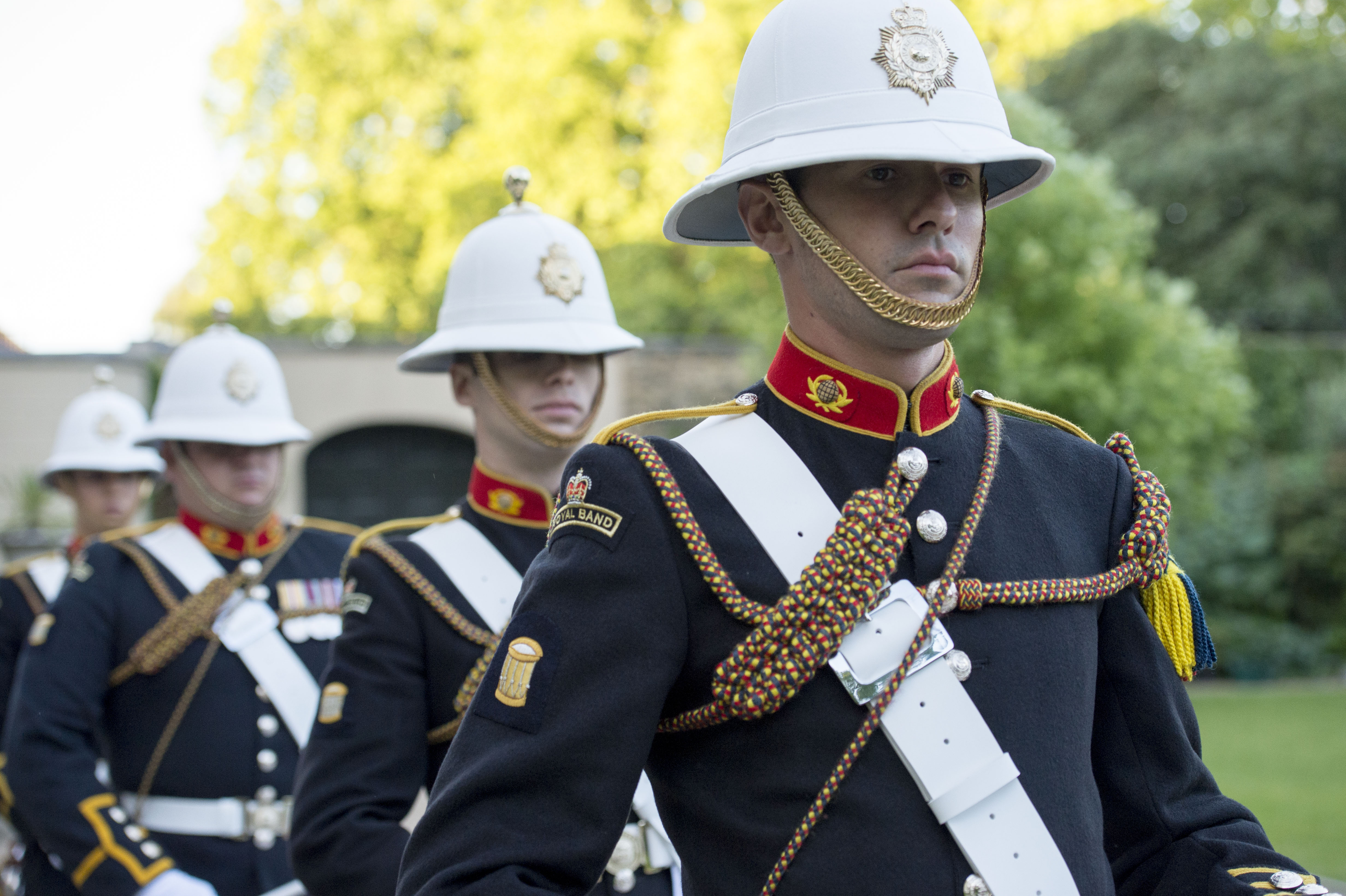
In addition to the drum badge on the right sleeve, buglers are also wearing dress cords.

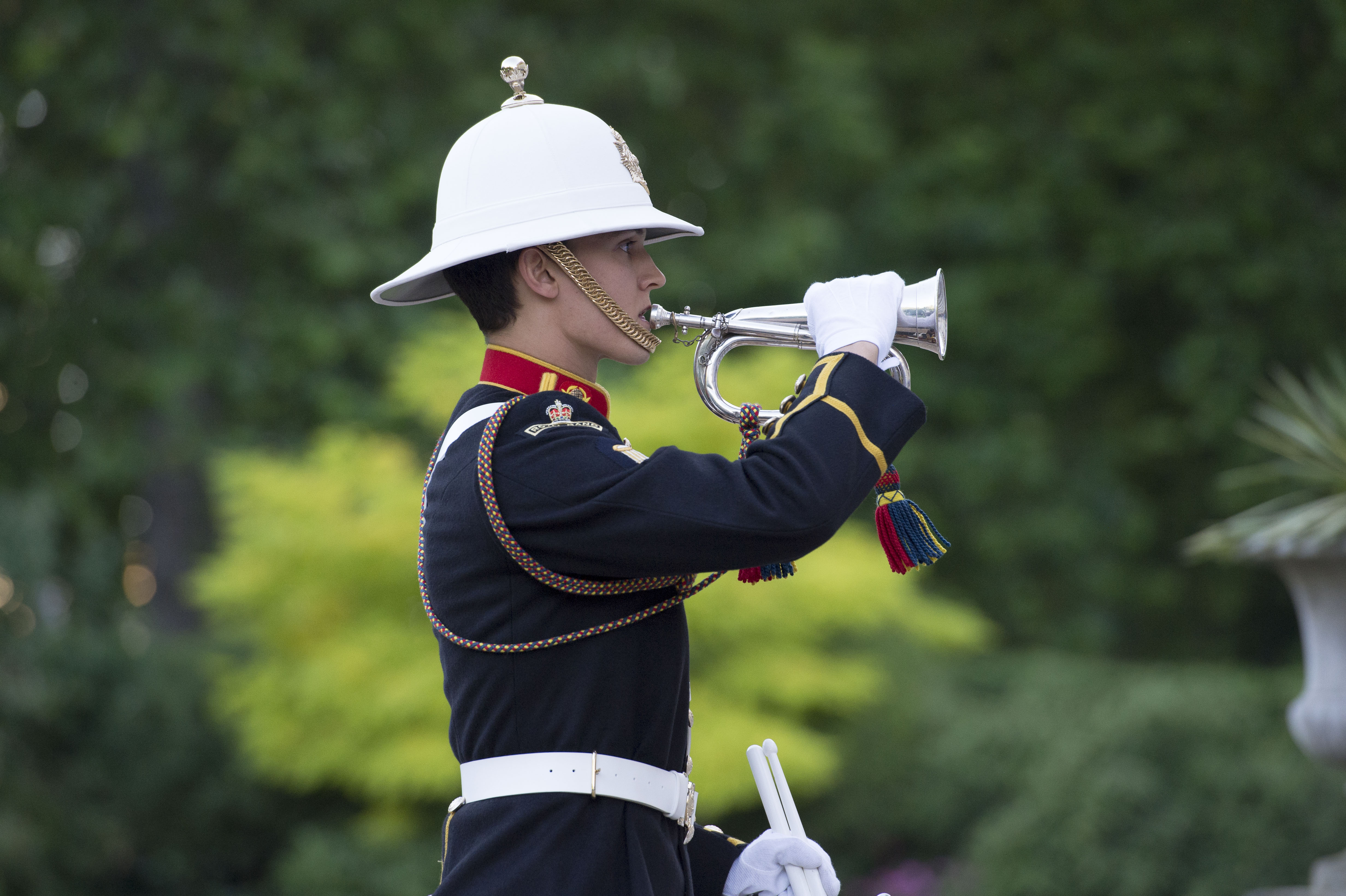
A bugler from the Band of HM Royal Marines Portsmouth (Royal Band) sounding a bugle call.

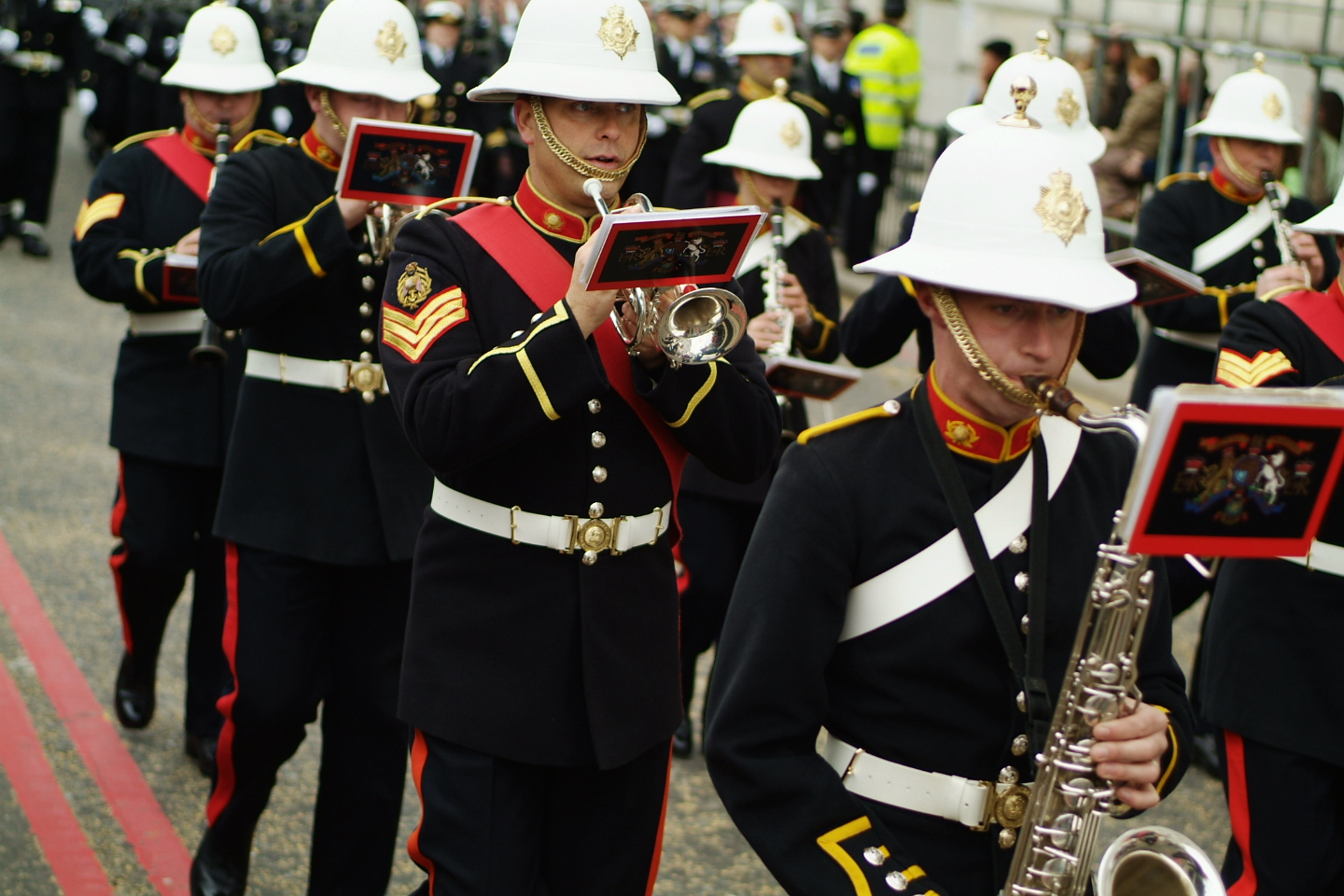
Musicians during the Lord Mayor's Show in 2006.

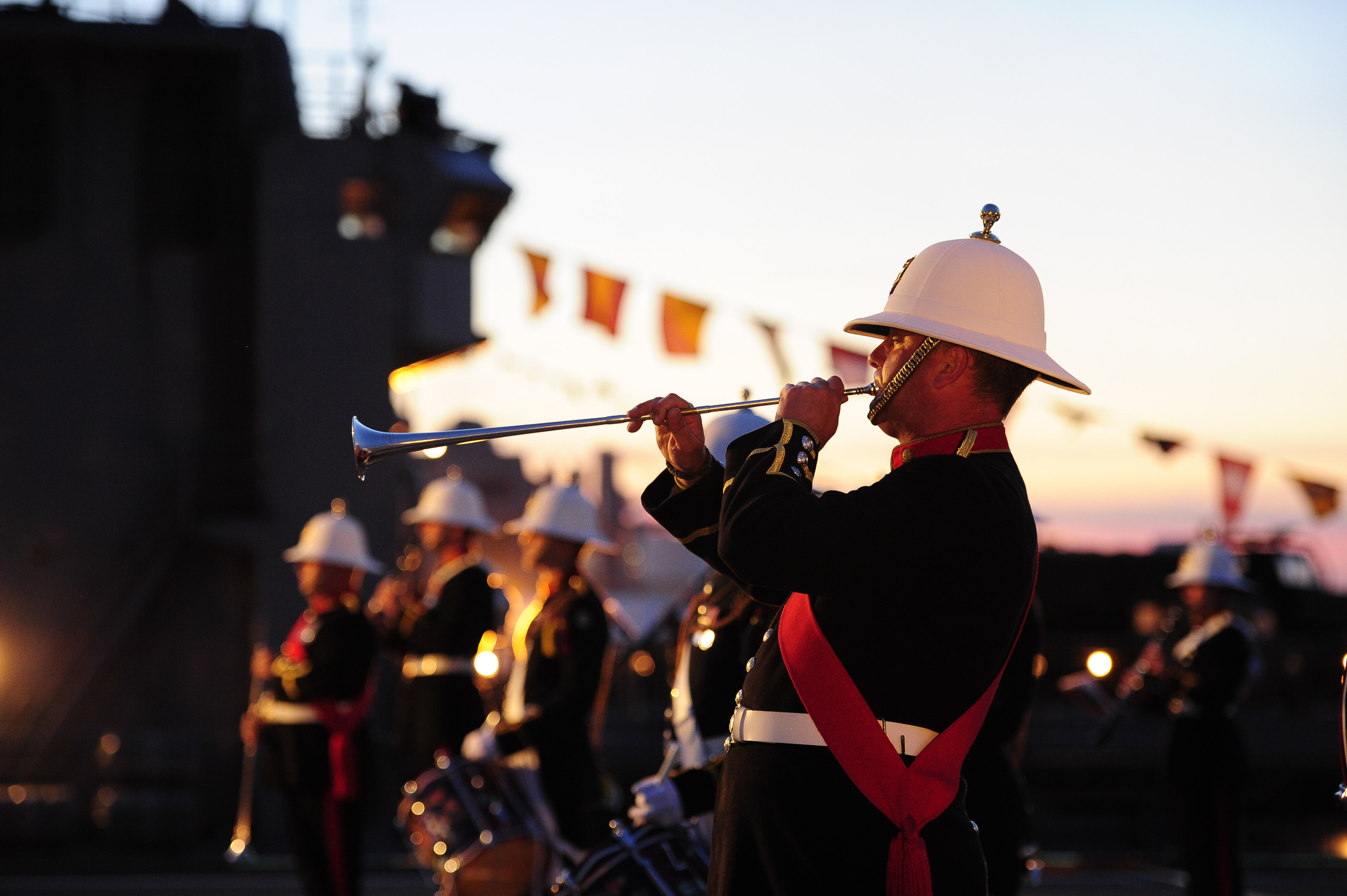
A cornet player performing on a posthorn during a reception aboard the RFA Argus (A135) in Baltimore's inner harbor.

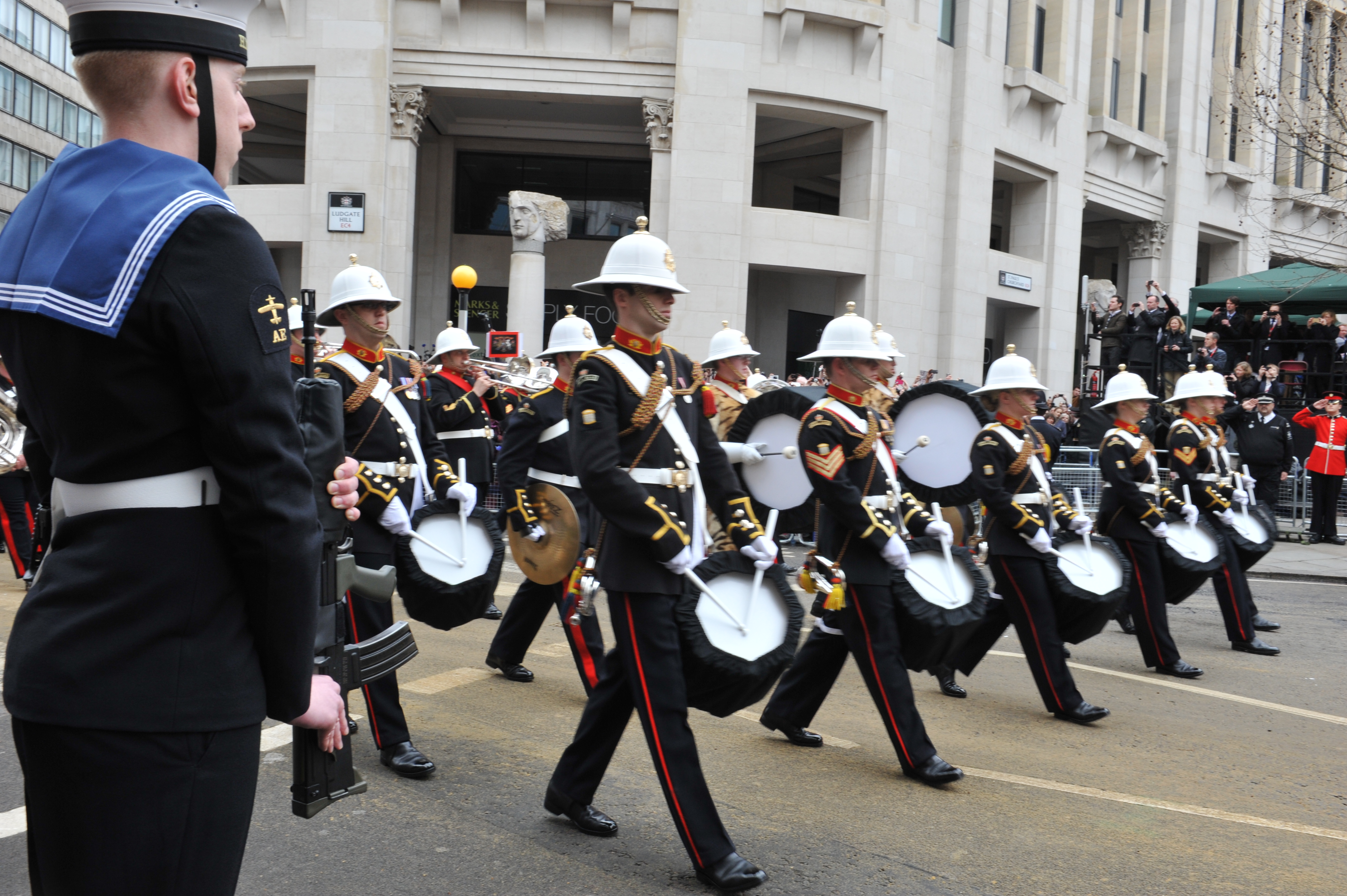
The Band of HM Royal Marines Portsmouth (Royal Band) leading the funeral procession of Margaret Thatcher with black-covered drums in 2013.

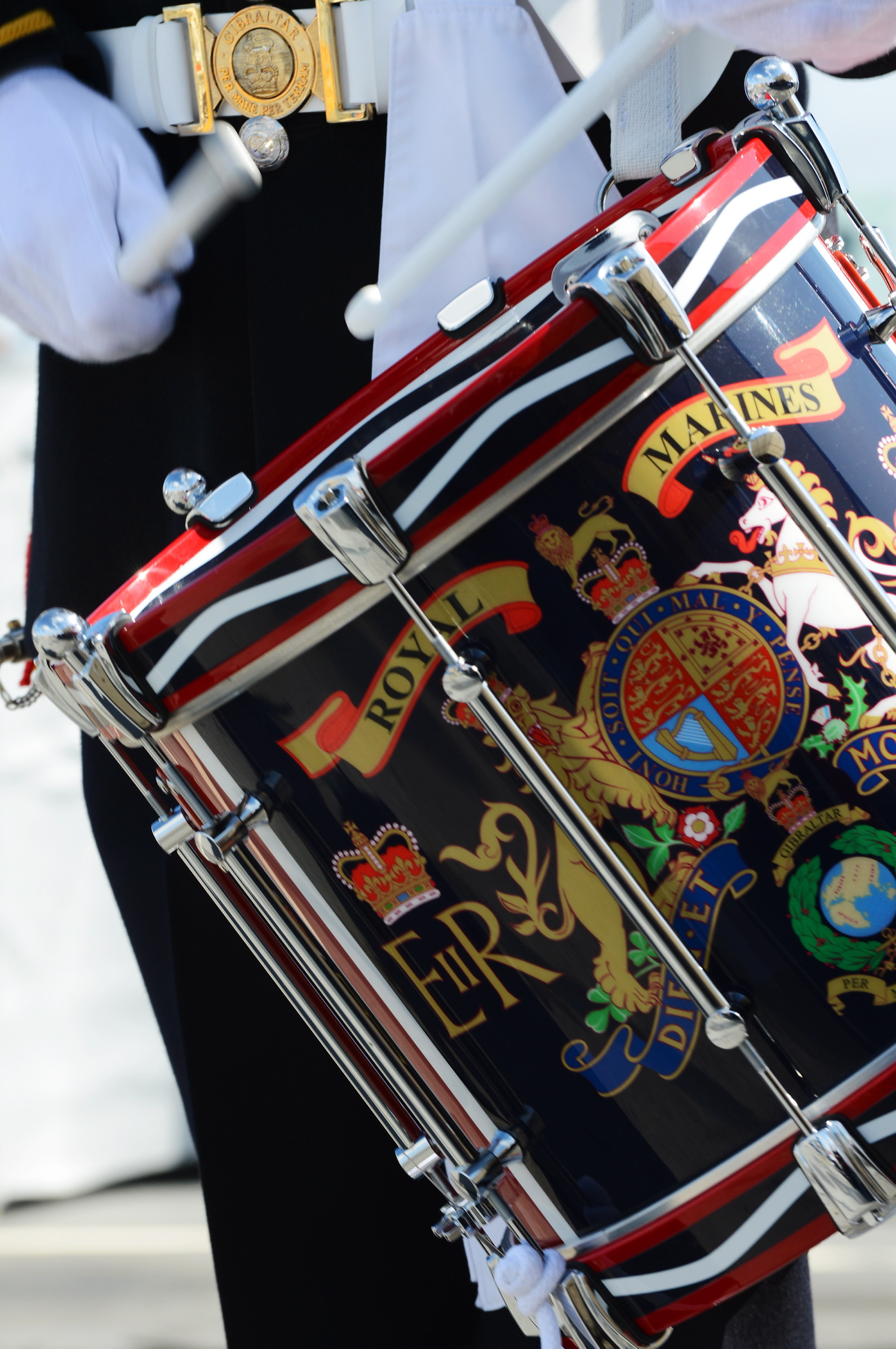
In British military tradition, side drums were increasingly decorated throughout the 19th century, until it bore the fully embellished regimental colours, including its battle honours. As such drums are often afforded respect.

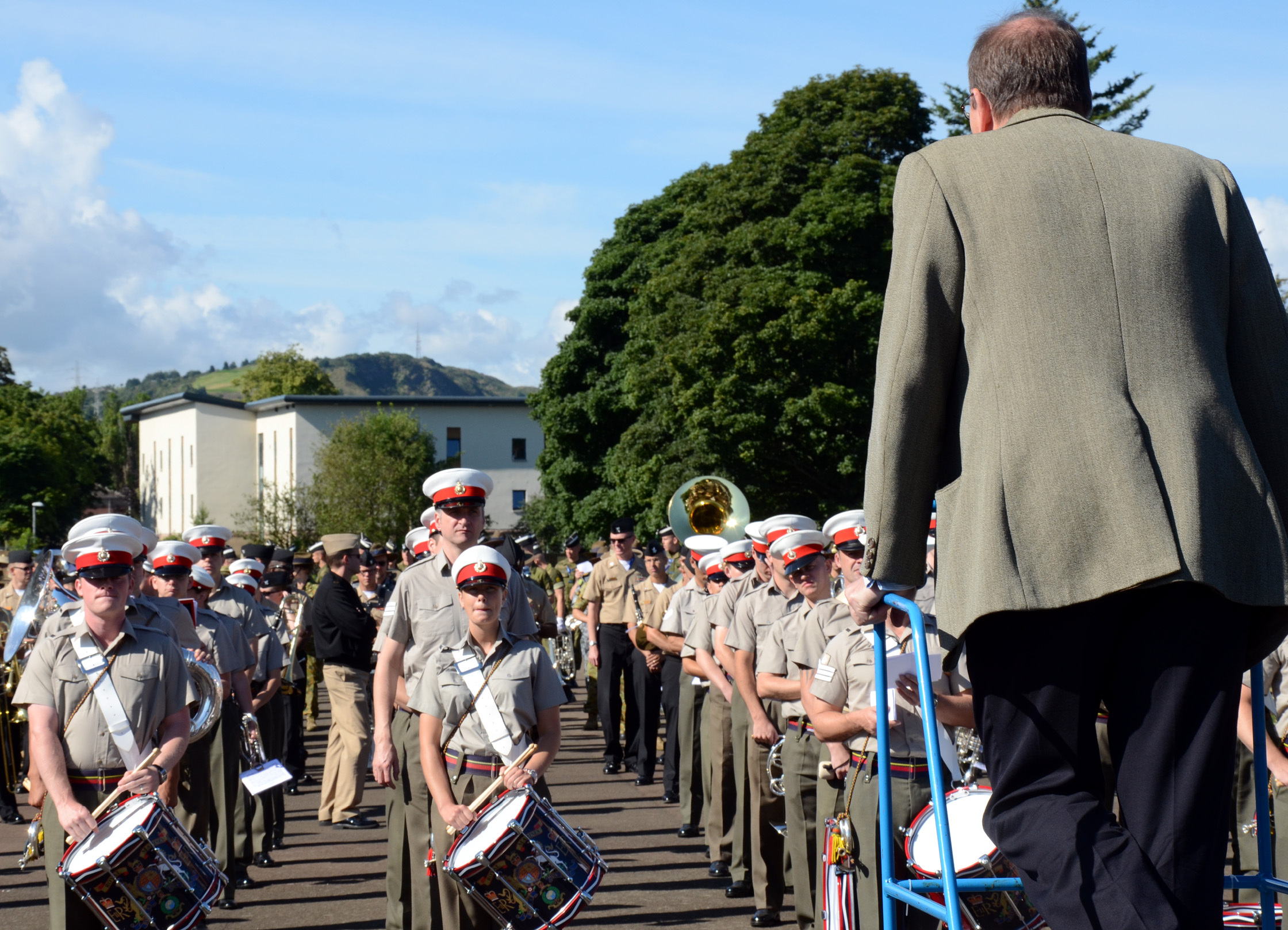
The Number 3A dress is worn as "daily working dress" in summer.

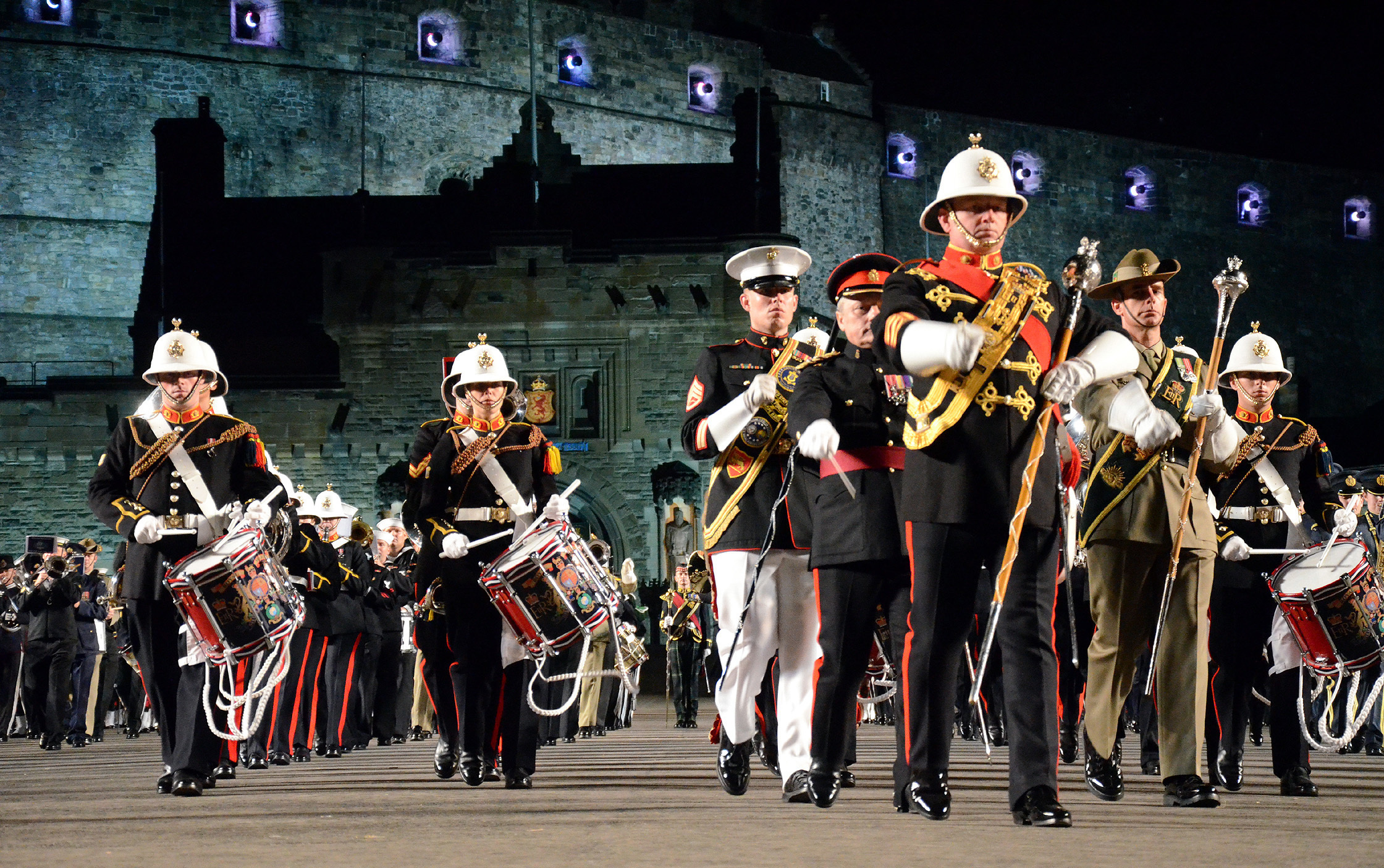
A drum major from the Royal Marines leading the joint service massed bands during the Royal Edinburgh Military Tattoo in 2012.

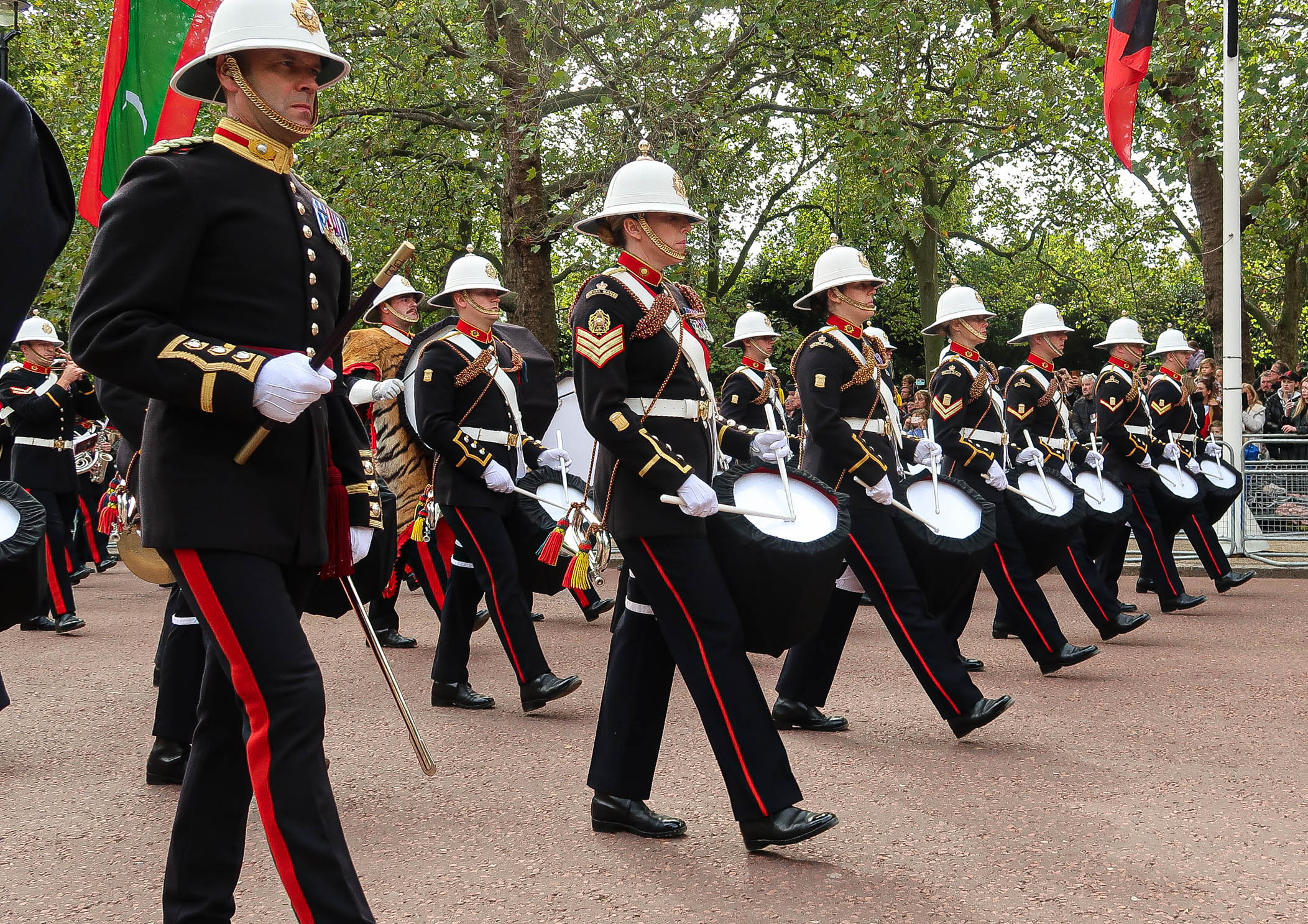
A band during the funeral procession of Elizabeth II (flanked by a Director of Music as a marker). The side, tenor and bass drums are wrapped in black cloth during a funeral procession.

== See also ==
- Lt. Col Sir Vivian Dunn
- Royal Marines Museum - home to a Royal Marines Band Service display.
- Rotterdam Marine Band of the Royal Netherlands Navy
- United States Marine Band
- Military band
