= Saumur International Festival of Military Bands =

French bi-annual military festival

The Saumur International Festival of Military Bands (French: Festival international de musiques militaires de Saumur) is a bi-annual event organized in the French city of Saumur by the Standing Committee of City Celebrations. The festival acts as a military tattoo, bringing military bands from the French Armed Forces and foreign countries. In 1985, it was conceived to switch the annual flower parade in the city with a festival of military music. Placed under the patronage of the French and foreign authorities (both in the civil and military sphere) the festival has since invited many countries since its creation. It usually takes place over the course of one weekend in the summer.

== Notable participants ==
- French Foreign Legion Music Band (MLE) (2015)
- Musique de l'Arme Blindée Cavalerie
- United Arab Emirates Armed Forces
- Gardemusik Wien
- Prince’s Band of Carabiniers
- Band of The 1st Brigade Cork
- Symphonic Band and Chorus of the Secretariat of the Navy of Mexico

In 2019, Lieutenant Léa Nzoufa Nze from the Armed Forces of Gabon became the first woman to conduct a military band at the festival.
