= Military Band Service of the Ministry of Emergency Situations of Russia =

- Военно-оркестровая служба Министерство по чрезвычайным ситуациям
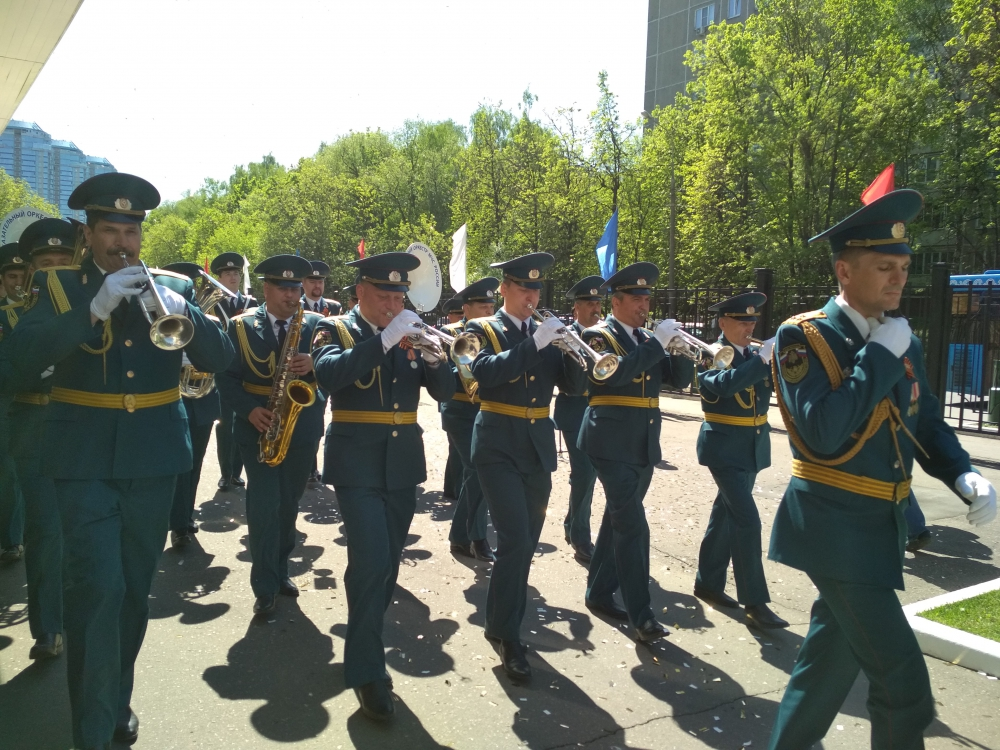
- The exemplary band at a veterans ceremony on 8 May 2018.
- Active: 1 January 1995; 30 years ago
- Country: Russia
- Branch: Ministry of Emergency Situations
- Type: Military Band Service
- Garrison/HQ: Moscow

Commanders
- Senior Director of Music: Colonel Vladislav Rybenko
- EMERCOM Band director: Anton Kozhevatov

The Military Band Service of the Ministry of Emergency Situations of Russia is a special military department that is the official military band service for the Ministry of Emergency Situations of Russia, being a branch of the Military Band Service of the Armed Forces of Russia.

In total, the band service includes 31 military bands. As of 1 February 2019, the EMERCOM Band Service consists of the following: 12 bands of rescue military units; 19 bands of FPS EMERCOM establishments. These include bands of directorates in Arkhangelsk and St. Petersburg.

== History ==
The band service was established in accordance with a ministerial decree on 1 January 1995. On the directive of the EMERCOM of Russia on 1 April 2016, the band service and the Exemplary Band were included in the staff of the academy of the Russian State Fire Service. In 2017, by the decree of President Vladimir Putin, Colonel Vladislav Rybenko of the band service was awarded the honorary title of Honored Artist of the Russian Federation.

== EMERCOM Band ==
Also known as the EMERCOM Band, the Exemplary Band of the Russian Emergencies Ministry (Russian: Оркестр МЧС России) was created on 12 May 1995. At the time of its founding, it was originally named the Exemplary Band of the Ministry of Civil Defense, Emergencies and Elimination of Consequences of Natural Disasters. In 2010, it was given its current name. The band actively performs in important venues of the capital, including the Great Hall of the Moscow Conservatory and the Grand Kremlin Palace. The musicians participate in Russian and international festivals of military bands. The EMERCOM Band consists of 97 musicians, whose repertoire consists of Western European and Russian music. The band director is Lieutenant Colonel of the Internal Service Anton Kozhevatov.

=== Events ===
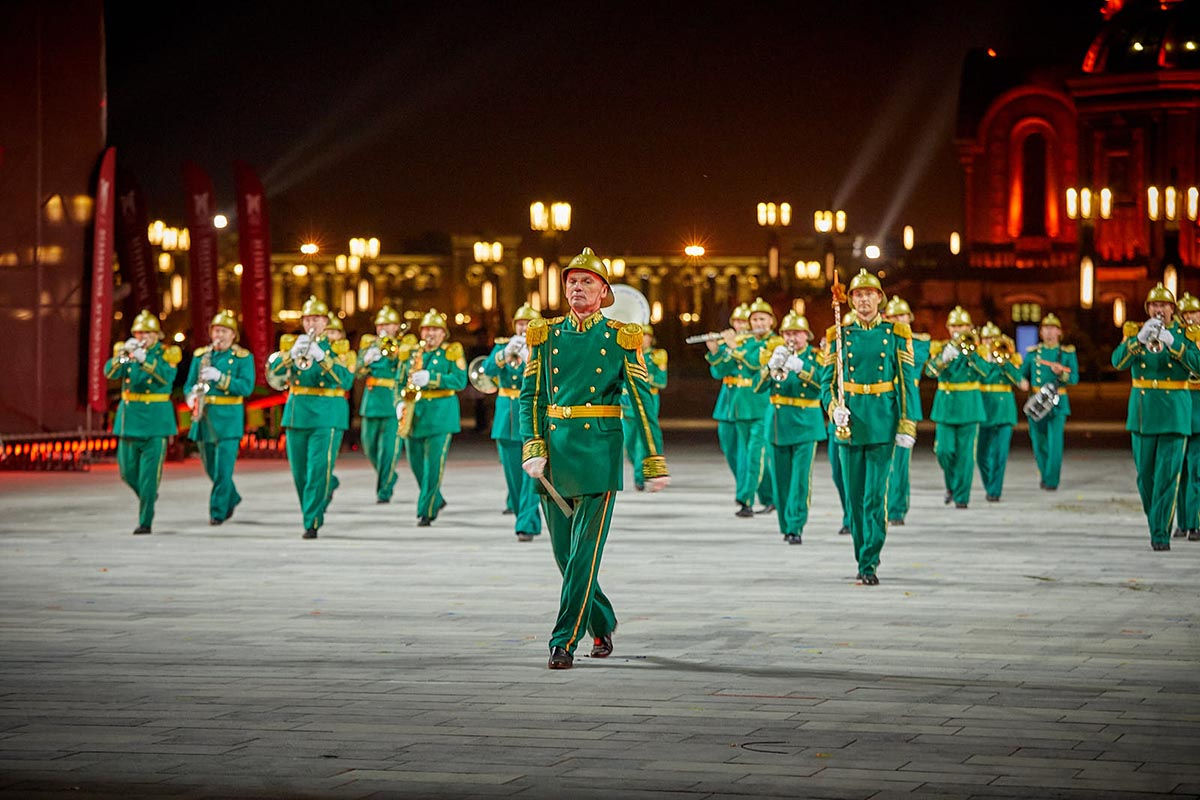
The band on Red Square.

The band has participated in socially significant cultural events in Russia including:

- Moscow Victory Day Parade
- Concert performances in the State Kremlin Palace, the State Duma, and the House of Moscow Oblast Government.
- Spasskaya Tower Military Music Festival and Tattoo
- Moscow City Day parade
- Festival of massed bands (Arkhangelsk)
- Festival of massed bands (St. Petersburg)
- The World Military Music Festival in Tripoli in honor of the ruby jubilee of the 1969 Libyan coup d'etat.
- Festival of children's and youth creativity "Salvation Star-2019"

== See also ==
- Presidential Band of the Russian Federation
- Military Band Service of the National Guard of Russia
- Central Band of the Border Guard Service of the Federal Security Service of Russia
- Police Band Service of the Ministry of Internal Affairs of Russia
