= Gardebataillon =

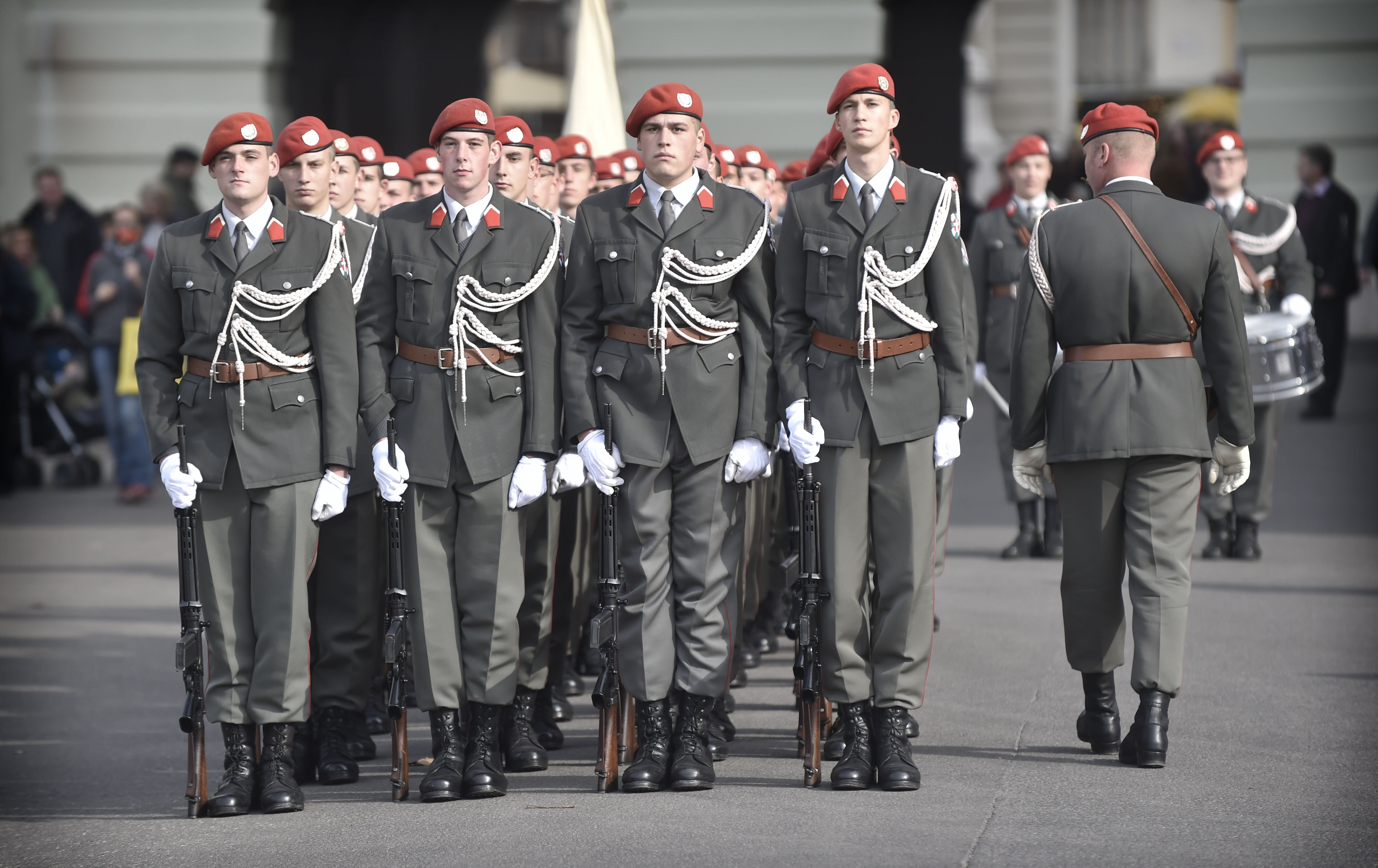
- Active: (i.) 1935 (March 1) – 1938 (March 13); (ii.) refounded in 1956.
- Country: Austria
- Branch: Austrian Land Forces
- Type: Guard of Honour
- Part of: Austrian Territorial Forces
- Headquarters: Maria Theresien Barracks, Vienna
- Anniversaries: March 1
- Equipment: Steyr AUG, Sturmgewehr 58

Commanders
- Guard Commander: Colonel Georg Frischeis
- Commander of the Band: Colonel Bernhard Heher

Insignia
- Ceremonial Flag (Front)

- Ceremonial Flag (Back)

The Gardebataillon (English: Guard Battalion) is an infantry unit in the Austrian Armed Forces with ceremonial duties. This battalion is one of the most important military units in the Austrian Armed Forces as its main task is to represent Austria at home and abroad in addition to being a light-infantry fighting force. It is stationed exclusively at Maria Theresien Barracks in Vienna.

== History ==
The battalion was formed on March 1, 1935, as the Vienna Guard Battalion. At that time it was based at the Hofburg Imperial Palace. It was dissolved in 1938 following the German Anschluss.

In 1956, the unit was restored, initially under the name Heereswachbataillon ("Army guard battalion"). Since that time it has had its headquarters in the Maria Theresa barracks. On 15 May 1957, it reassumed its original name.

== Regimental Structure ==
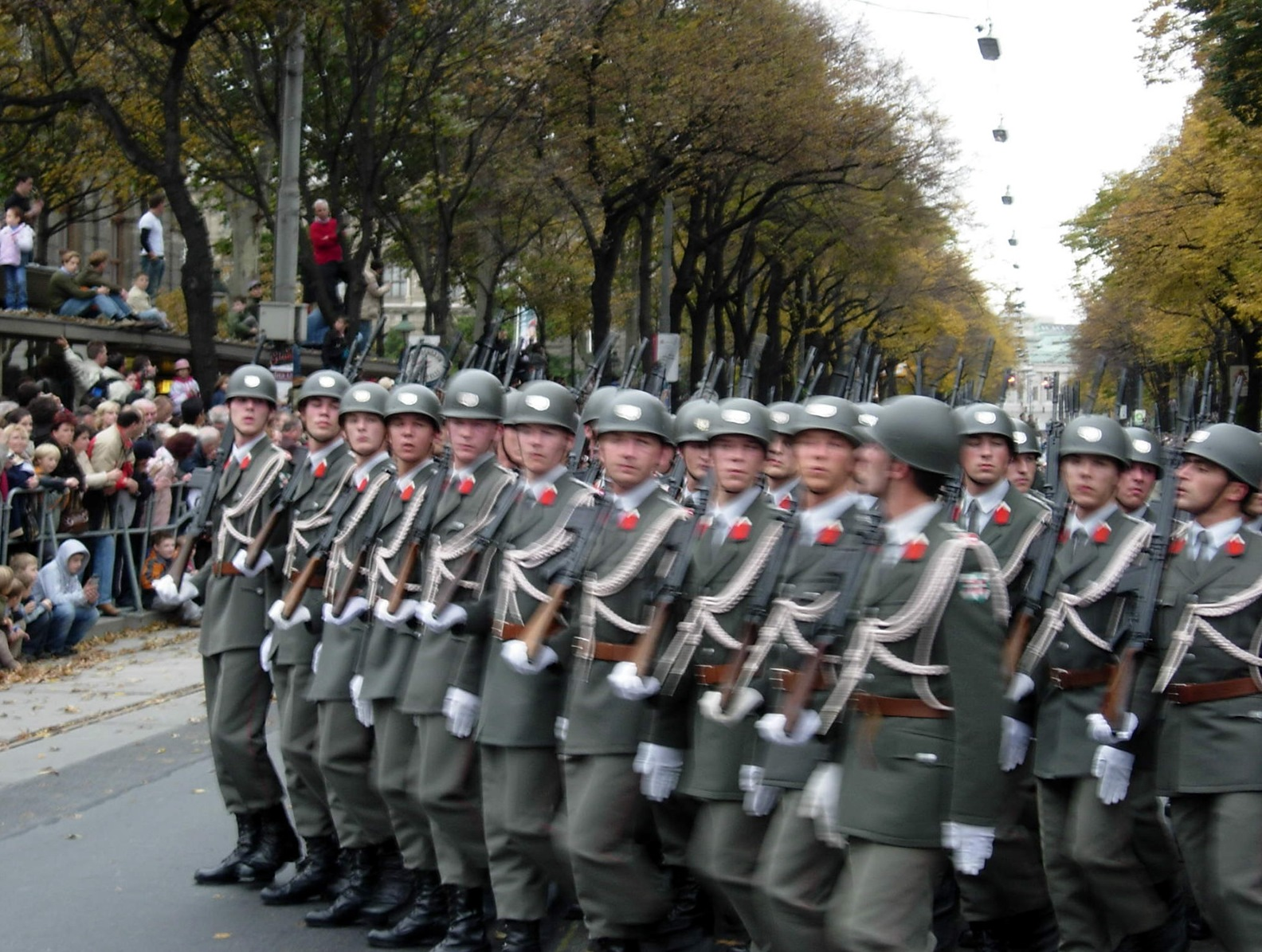
The Gardebataillon during a parade in Vienna in 2005

- Guard Battalion
  - Command and Staff Company
  - 1st Company
  - 2nd Company
  - 3rd Company
  - 4th Company
  - 5th Company (KPE, cadre-only company)
  - Gardemusik

== Uniform ==
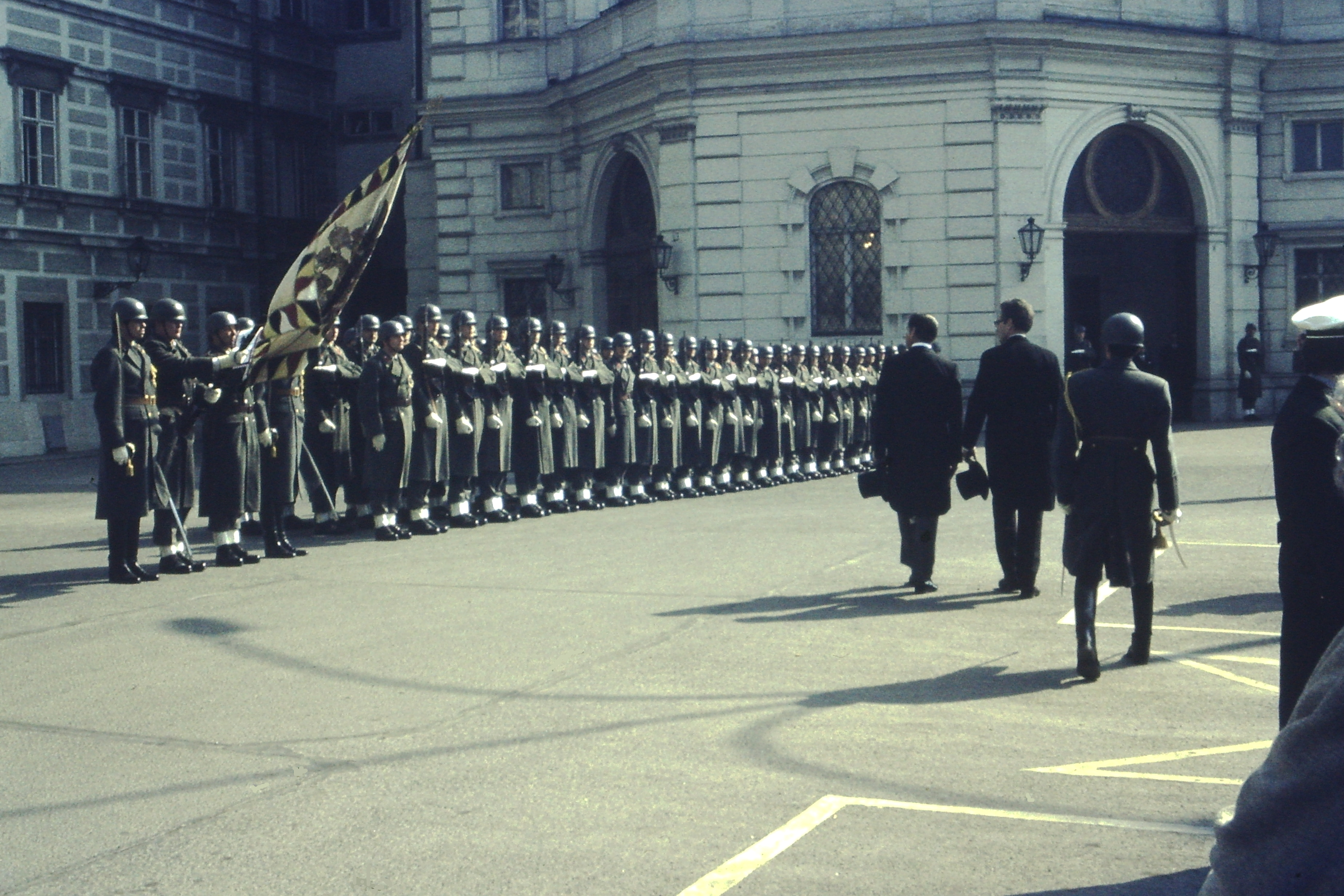
The battalion taking up their positions outside Presidential Office in March 1980.

Their uniform is very similar to the uniform of the German Wachbataillon. The soldiers of the Guard are distinguished by their red beret, and their white collar. Apart from the beret, the battalion's uniform also includes a ceremonial helmet, with the coat of arms of Austria on the front.

== Purpose ==
Its tasks include the protection of federal buildings such as the Hofburg Imperial Palace and the Federal Chancellery. The battalion also provides Guards of Honour to carry out representative duties (such as accreditations of ambassadors, welcoming ceremonies, and parades). Of these, the seniormost task is to provide honours for high ranking national & foreign dignitaries during events of importance. The deliverable for this task is the battalion's two honor Guard companies. The detached companies perform their respective public duties in Vienna, the national capital. It also appears during repatriation ceremonies for fallen soldiers returning from combat.

The Guardsmen are trained as infantrymen (Jäger). In the event of a deployment, the unit is tasked with area and asset protection (securing facilities and buildings) as well as personal and escort protection.

== Gardemusik Wien ==
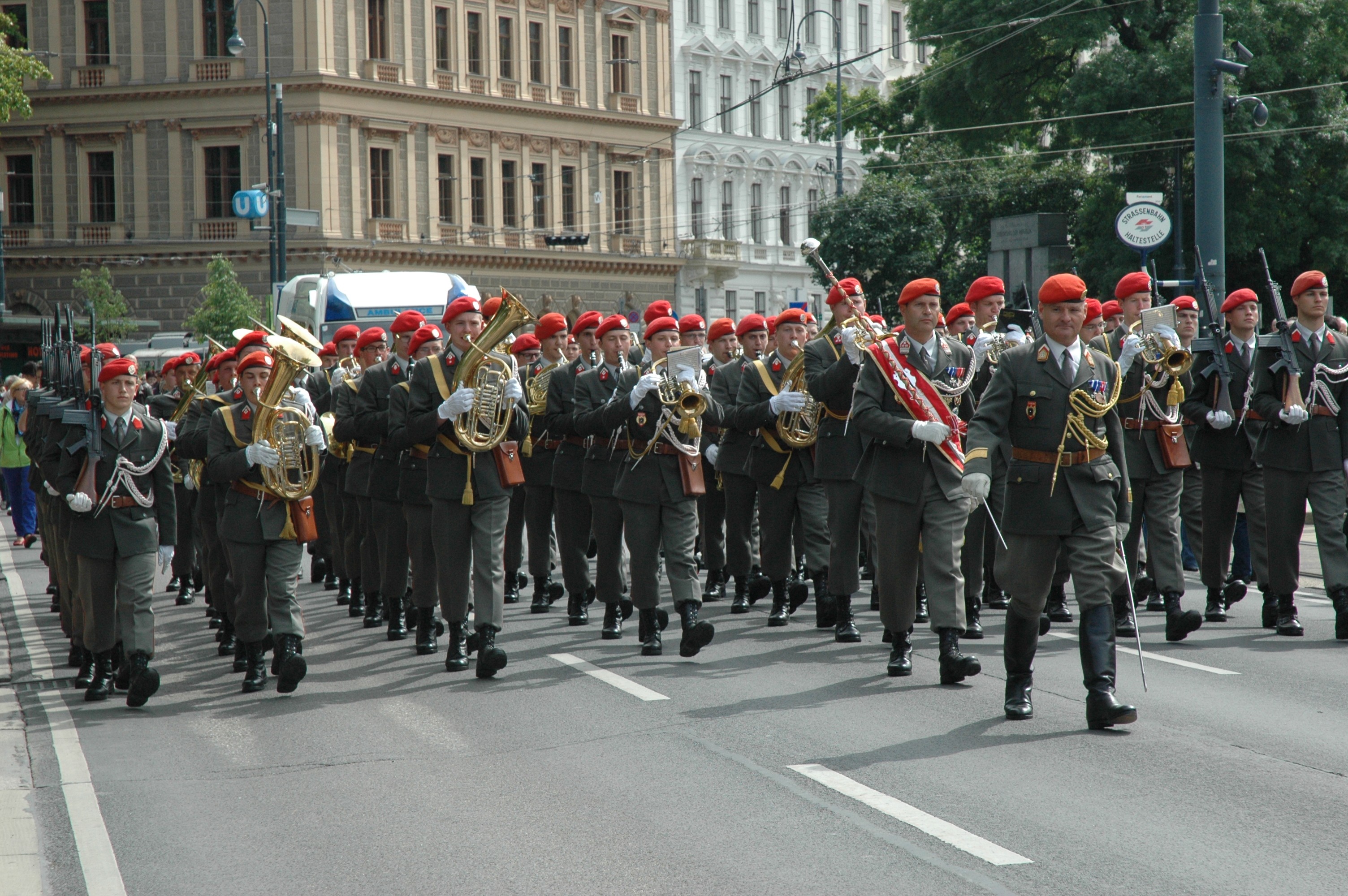
The Gardemusik at the 34th Austrian Brass Music Festival 2013 in Vienna

The Gardemusik Wien (Guards Band Vienna) is one of the nine military bands in Austria and is the official regimental band of the Gardebataillon. It was formed after the Austrian State Treaty came into effect, the band was formed from the band of the Austria border guard department. It consists of 60 military musicians. It regularly provides musical accompaniment to the rest of the battalion. The unit always composes a new military march during a presidential inauguration in honor of the elected President of Austria (e.g. Alexander Van der Bellen in 2017.). The current commander of the Band is Bernhard Heher.

== Photos ==
=== Gardebataillon ===
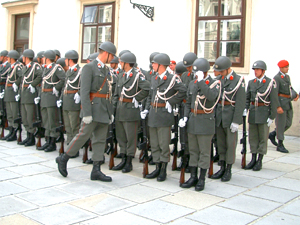

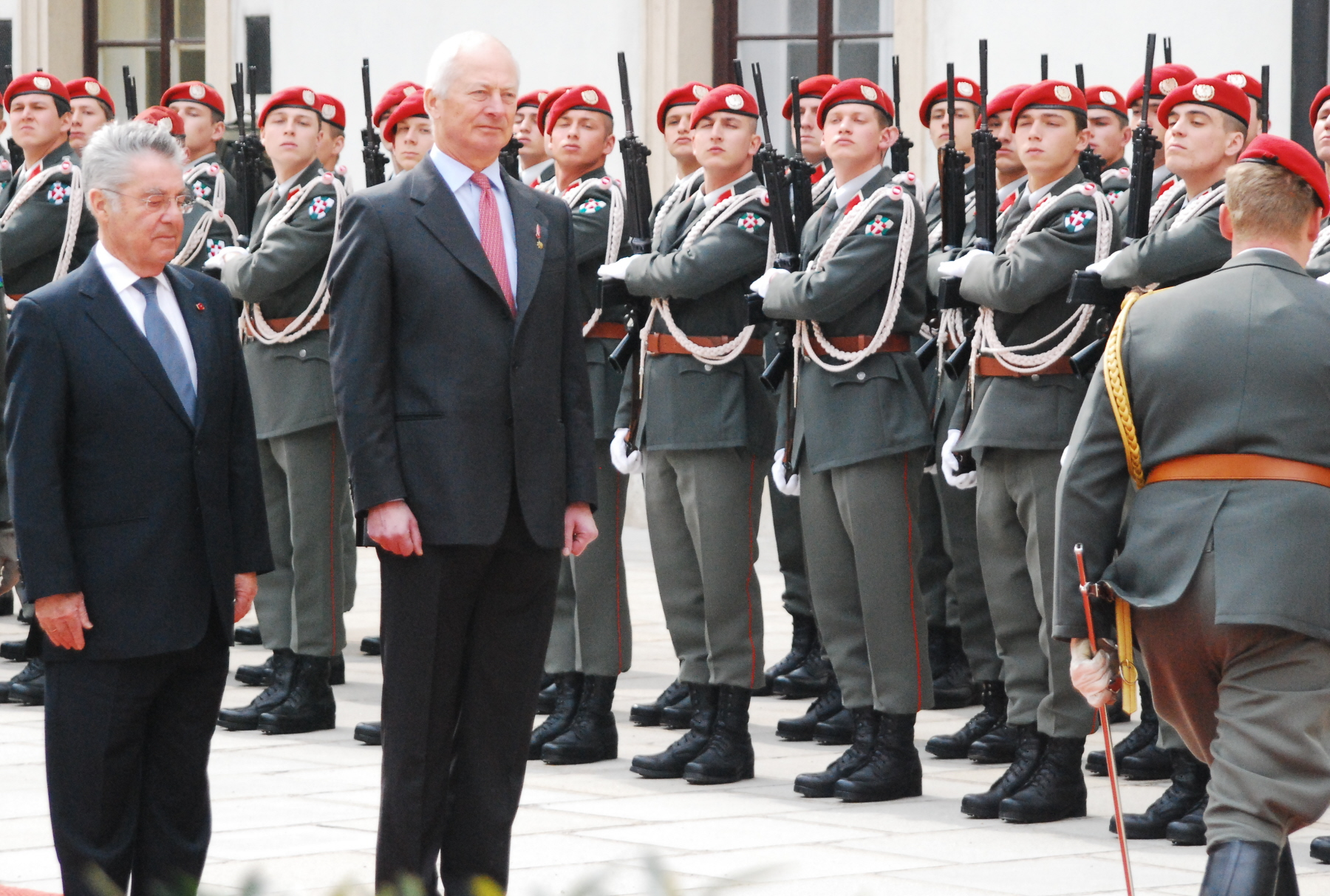

=== Gardemusik ===
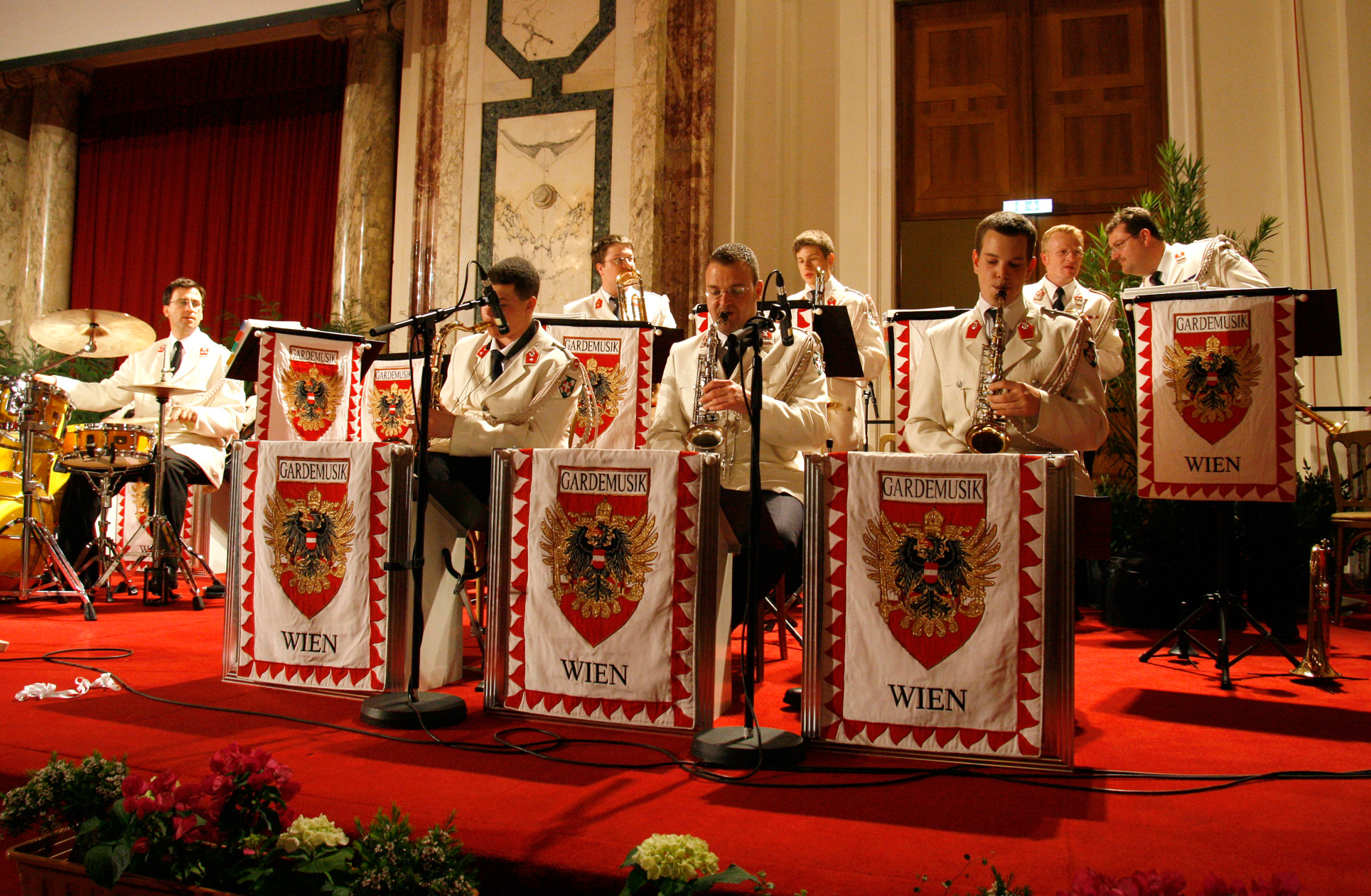

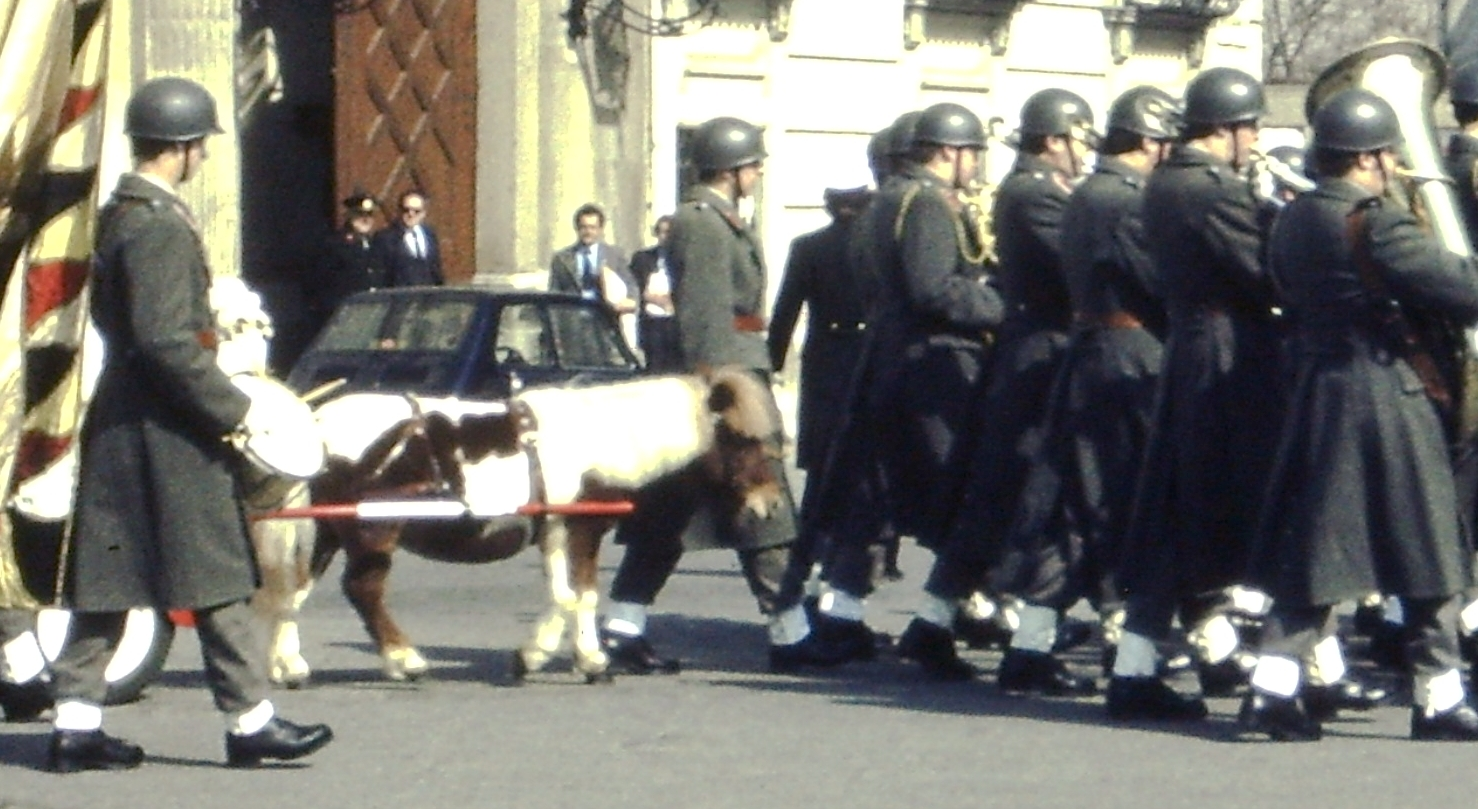

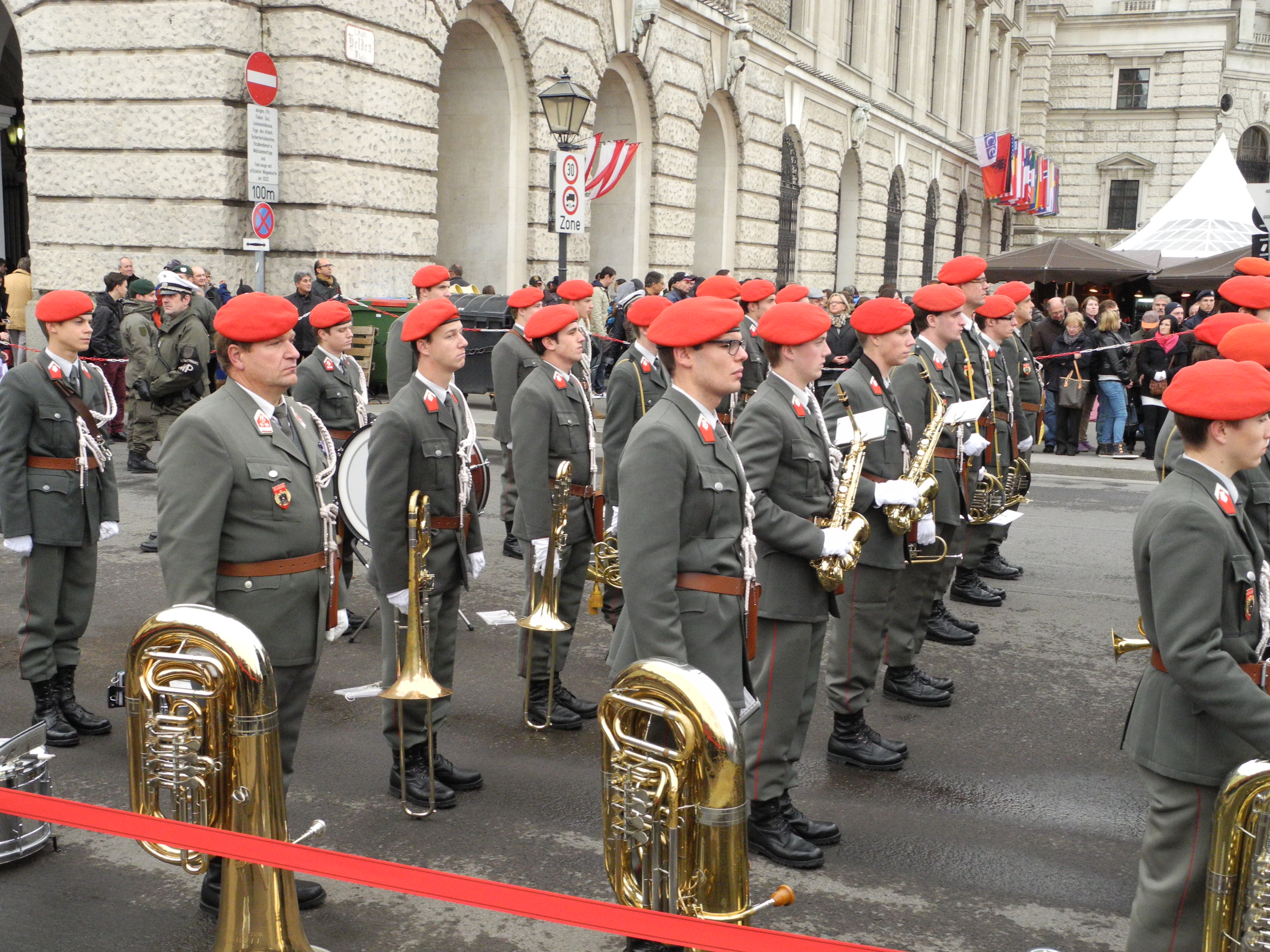

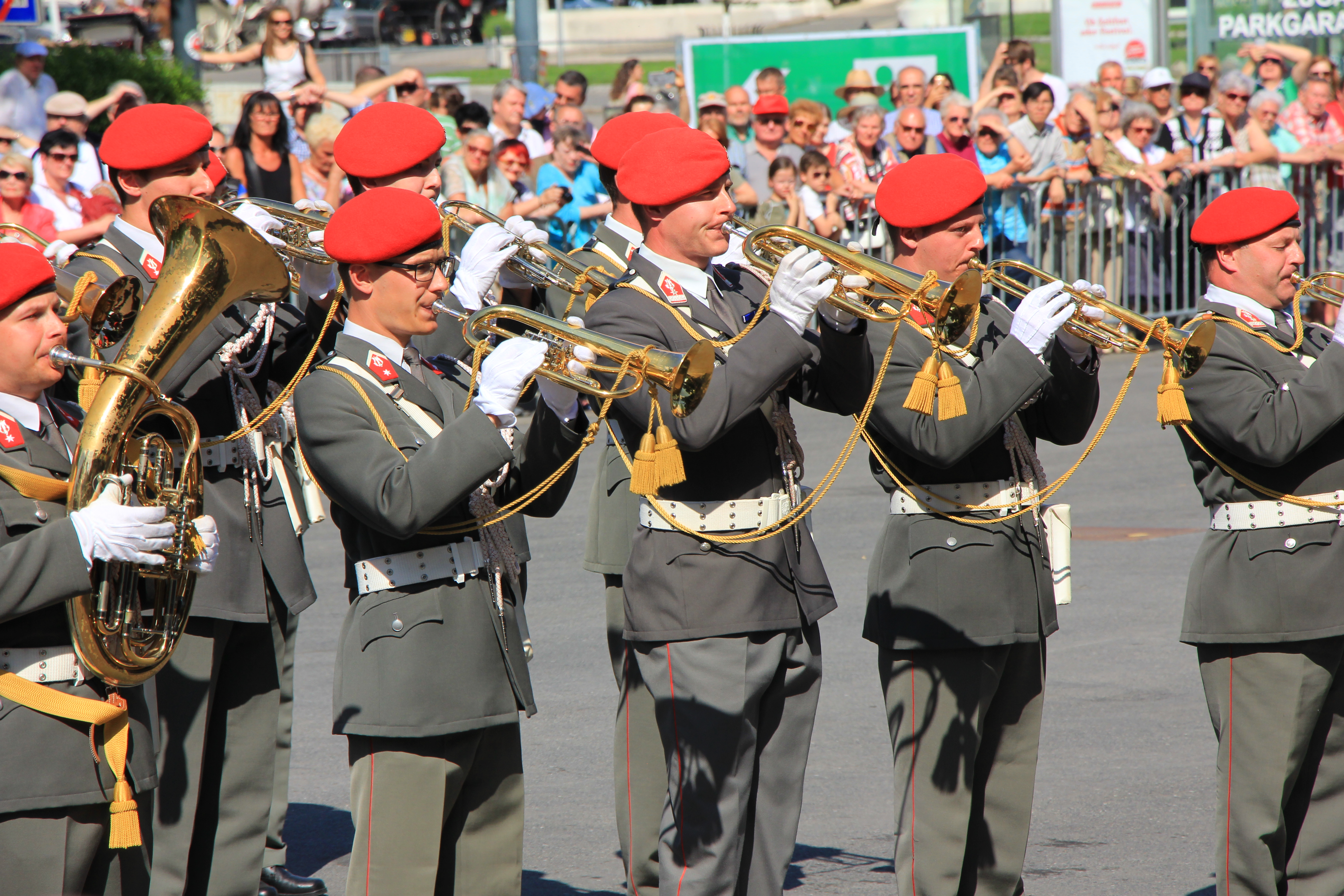

== See also ==
- Austrian Armed Forces
- Wachbataillon
- Foot guards
- Guard of honour
