= 40th anniversary of the Libyan Revolution =

2009 national event in Libya

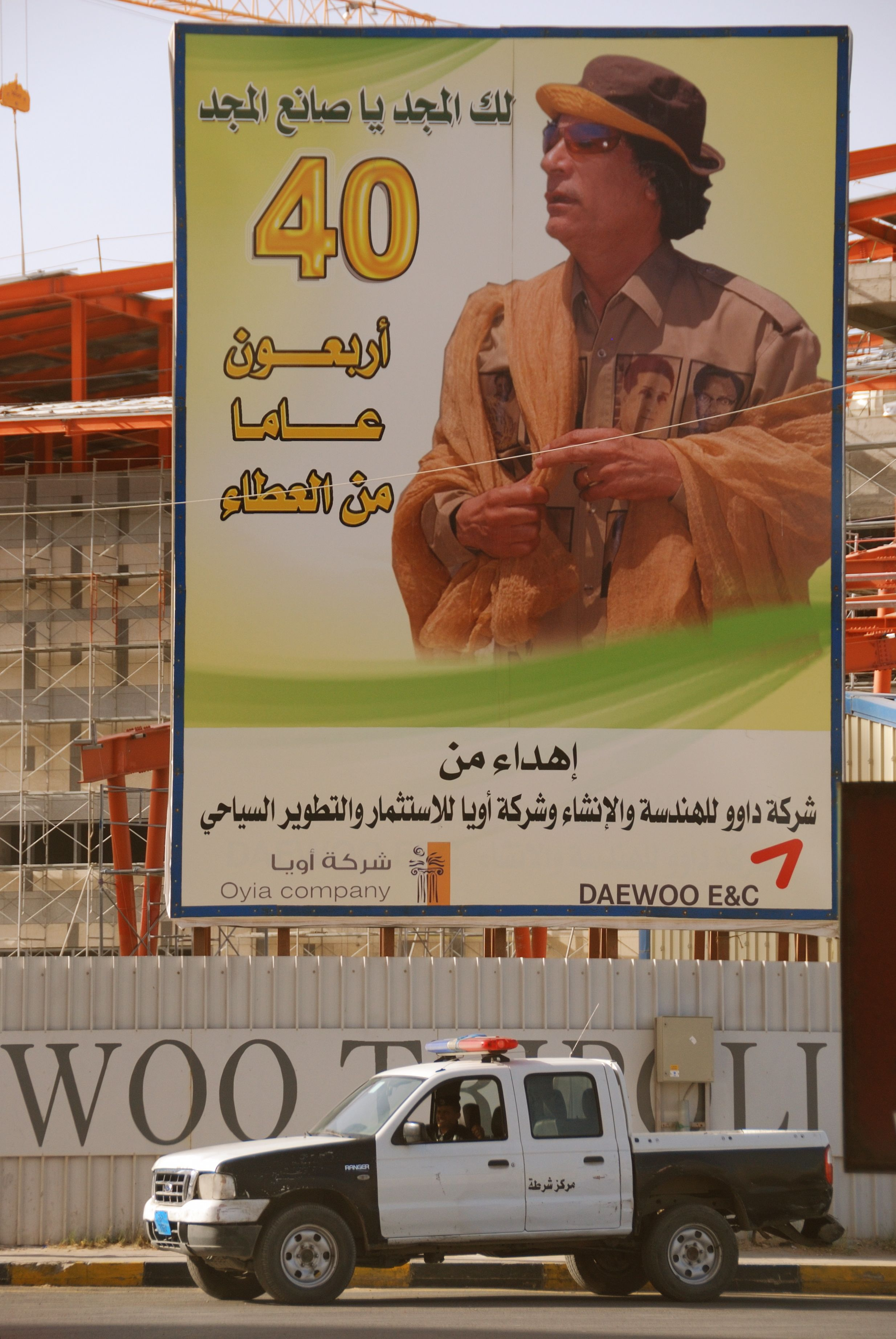
- A poster of Gaddafi in Tripoli, on the occasion of the 40th anniversary of the Libyan Revolution.

- Tripoli (Libya) Location of the Libyan capital city of Tripoli, where the main celebratory events were held
- Native name: الذكرى الأربعون للثورة الليبية
- Date: 1 September 2009; 17 years ago
- Location: Great Socialist People's Libyan Arab Jamahiriya; 32°53′14″N 13°11′29″E

The 40th anniversary of the Libyan Revolution (Arabic: الذكرى الأربعون للثورة الليبية) was a ruby jubilee anniversary in the Great Socialist People's Libyan Arab Jamahiriya celebrated on 1 September 2009 in honor of the 1969 Libyan revolution.

== Background ==
The coup, known officially as the al-Fateh Revolution or the 1 September Revolution, was carried out by group of Libyan Army officers led by Captain Muammar Gaddafi, known as the Free Officers Movement. The goal of this group was to overthrow King Idris I. On 1 September, 70 officers and enlisted soldiers who mostly came from the Corps of Signals launched a seizure of the government in Benghazi and, within two hours, gained control of the entire national government. One of the coup plotters first actions were to abolish the Kingdom of Libya and proclaim the establishment of the Libyan Arab Republic. Institutions that were later created such as the Libyan People's Court were used to purge any remnants of the former regime. The coup, staged amidst the Arab Cold War, was the result of a continuous rise in ideologies such as Nasserism, Arab nationalism and Arab socialism throughout the Islamic and particularly the Arab world. The coup transformed the country into a military dictatorship under the Libyan Revolutionary Command Council, and later a socialist state or Jamahiriya.

== Events ==
=== Military parade ===
A military parade of troops of the African Union and the Libyan Armed Forces took place on Green Square on 1 September. This marked the first day of celebrations.

Troops from foreign countries took part in the parade. Units that represented their country included:

- (Egypt) Egyptian Armed Forces
- Zimbabwe National Army
- Armed Forces of Equatorial Guinea
- (Eritrea) Eritrean Defence Forces
- (The Gambia) Gambia Armed Forces
- (Greece) Hellenic Navy
- (Sudan) Sudanese Armed Forces
- Uganda People's Defence Force
- (Zambia) Zambian Army
- Ghana Army
- (Serbia) Serbian Armed Forces
- (Russia) 154th Preobrazhensky Independent Commandant's Regiment
- (Ukraine) Separate Presidential Brigade

Musical accompaniment was provided by the Armed Forces Band, who performed the national anthem, Allahu Akbar. Music was also provided by the bands of foreign states, including the Band of the 154th Preobrazhensky Regiment as well as the bands participating in the World Military Music Festival. For the foreign section of the parade, the bands performed Russian military marches, particularly the Preobrazhensky Regiment March, Hero and Farewell of Slavianka.

=== Military tattoo ===
The World Military Music Festival took place on 2 September as a military tattoo that saw the participation of military bands and cultural groups from 16 nations and 5 continents. It was presided by Gaddafi's son Mutassim in his position as National Security Advisor of Libya.

Country	Name	Photo	Name
Algeria	Republican Guard Band	Australia	Rats of Tobruk Memorial Pipes & Drums
Austria	Military Music Band Tyrol	Egypt	Egyptian Armed Forces Symphonic Band
Ethiopia	Ethiopian National Defence Force Band	France	Music of the Foreign Legion
Italy	Band of the Mechanized Brigade "Sassari", the Sbandieratori Gubbio and the Sbandieratori Sansepolcro	Kenya	Waza Afrika Troupe
(History of Libya under Muammar Gaddafi) Libyan Arab Jamahiriya	Joint Band of the Libyan Armed Forces	Malta	Armed Forces of Malta Band
Mexico	Symphonic Band and Chorus of the Secretariat of the Navy of Mexico	New Zealand	Pipes & Drums of Christchurch City
Pakistan	Pakistan Armed Forces Band	Russia	EMERCOM Band and the Nalmes State Academic Dance Company
Senegal	Principal Band of the Senegalese Armed Forces	Tunisia	Tunisian Army Band
Ukraine	Central Air Force Band	United Kingdom / Wales	Porth Tywyn Band

Each individual band and group had their own short performance before being brought together for massed finale. Performances included pipe band songs, the national anthem, and the massed bands leaving to a Russian tune. The performance took place on Green Square in front of an audience of invited guests and senior military officials and thousands of members of an incredibly appreciative general public. The bands present also gave an additional impromptu street performance on the square.

Morocco was set to participate in the event, however withdrew after it learned that representatives of the Sahrawi Arab Democratic Republic and the Polisario Front would be attending.

Controversially, Somali pirate leader Mohamed "Afweyne" Abdi Hassan was invited to and attended the celebrations. Gaddafi frequently defended and politically supported the Somali pirates.

== Attendees ==
- (Sri Lanka) Sri Lankan President Mahinda Rajapaksa
- (Yemen) Yemeni President Ali Abdullah Saleh
- President of the Dominican Republic Leonel Fernandez
- (Serbia) Serbian President Boris Tadić
- (Algeria) Algerian President Abdelaziz Bouteflika
- (Tunisia) Tunisian President Zine El Abidine Ben Ali
- (Brazil) Brazilian President Luiz Inácio Lula da Silva
- (Argentina) Argentine President Cristina Fernandez de Kirchner
- (Venezuela) Venezuelan President Hugo Chavez
- Sheikh Hamad bin Khalifa Al Thani of Qatar
- Sheikh Sabah Al-Ahmad Al-Jaber Al-Sabah of Kuwait
- King Abdullah II of Jordan
- (Sudan) Sudanese President Omar Al-Bashir
- (Mali) Malian President Amadou Toumani Touré
- (The Gambia) Gambian President Yahya Jammeh
- (Chad) Chadian President Idriss Deby
- (Zambia) Zambian President Rupiah Banda
- (Niger) Nigerien President Mamadou Tandja
- (Republic of the Congo) Congolese President Denis Sassou Nguesso
- (Burkina Faso) Burkinabe President Blaise Compaore
- President Francois Bozize of the Central African Republic
- President Jakaya Kikwete of Tanzania
- President Faure Gnassingbé of Togo
- President Yayi Boni of Benin
- President Ahmed Abdallah Mohamed Sambi of the Comoros Islands
- President Mohamed Ould Abdel Aziz of Mauritania
- President Pedro Pires of Cape Verde
- (São Tomé and Príncipe) President Fradique Menezes of Sao Tome and Principe
- (Burundi) Burundian President Pierre Nkurunziza
- Prime Minister Meles Zenawi of Ethiopia
- (Philippines) Filipino President Gloria Macapagal Arroyo
- (Palestine) Palestinian President Mahmoud Abbas
- (Bosnia and Herzegovina) Bosnian President Željko Komšić
- President George Abela of Malta
- President Filip Vujanović of Montenegro
- Acting President of Guinea-Bissau Raimundo Pereira
- President Mohamed Abdelaziz of the Sahrawi Arab Democratic Republic
- President of the Council of State of Oman Yahya Ben Mahfoudh Al-Mundiri
- Sheikh Mansour Bin Zayed Al Nahyan, Minister of Presidential Affairs of the United Arab Emirates
- National Security Advisor to the President of Belarus Viktor Lukashenko
- Vice President of Gabon Didjob Divungi Di Ndinge
- Vice President of Ghana John Dramani Mahama
- Vice President of Nigeria Goodluck Jonathan accompanied by former president Olusegun Obasanjo
- Vice President of Iraq Tariq Al-Hashimi
- Prime Minister of Namibia Nahas Angula
- Prime Minister of Morocco Abbas Al-Fasi
- Prime Minister of Pakistan Yousaf Raza Gillani
- Prime Minister of Lesotho Pakalitha Mosisli
- Prime Minister of Equatorial Guinea Francisco Pascual Obama Asue
- Prime Minister of Somalia Omar Sharmarke
- Prime Minister of Singapore Lee Hsien Loong
- Field Marshal Mohamed Hussein Tantawi, Minister of Defense of Egypt
- Vice President of Liberia Joseph Boakai
- Chairman of the State Duma of Russia Boris Gryzlov

== Gallery ==
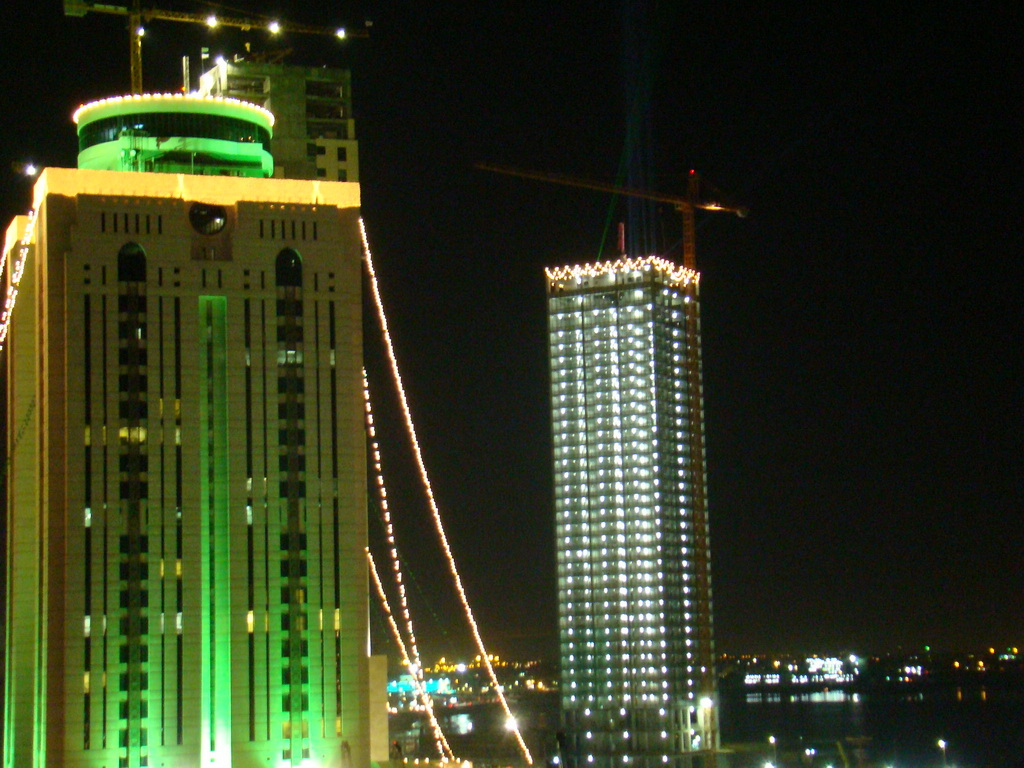
Light show in Tripoli on 25 August.

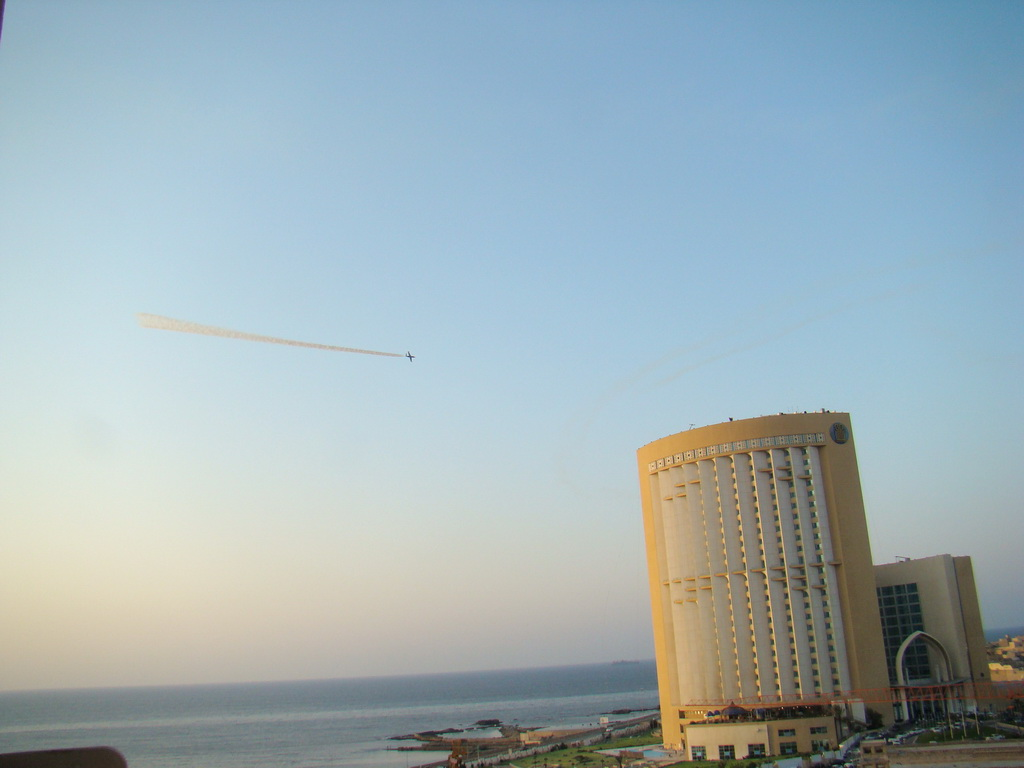
A plane flying over Tripoli's Corinthia Hotel during an air show rehearsal on 30 August.

== See also ==
- 60th anniversary of the People's Republic of China
- 25th anniversary of Hamas
- History of Libya under Muammar Gaddafi
