= Central Band of the Border Guard Service of the Federal Security Service of Russia =

Musical unit in Russia

- Центральный оркестр пограничной службы Федеральной службы безопасности России
- Active: 1978; 48 years ago
- Country: Russia
- Branch: Border Service of the Federal Security Service of the Russian Federation
- Type: Military Band
- Garrison/HQ: Moscow
- Nickname: Russian Frontier Guard Band
- Anniversaries: Border Guards Day (on May 28)

Commanders
- Director of Music and Artistic Director: Colonel Andrey Kapralov
- Conductors: Lieutenant Colonel Alexey Strenadko and Major Vladimir Kolovanov
- Chief Ballet Master: Gennadiy Minkh
- Notable commanders: Viktor Runov (1932-1947); Yevgeniy Mazin (1970-1993)

The Central Band of the Border Guard Service of the Federal Security Service of Russia, also known as the Russian Frontier Guard Band, is a special military unit that is the official flagship military band for the Border Service of the FSB of Russia. The band is a branch of the Military Band Service of the Armed Forces of Russia and is one of the leading music ensembles in the Russian Federation. It is professionally associated with the Ministry of Culture of Russia.

== Purpose ==
The band regularly participates in national events and holidays, especially ones that have the participation of the President of Russia and leaders of the Border Guard Service of Russia and members of the State Duma and the Federation Council. In addition, it frequently holds concerts for soldiers of the Border Guard Service. The band closely cooperates with government organizations and artistic groups, as well as actively tours Russia and abroad, commonly performing on the radio and television.

== Administration ==
- Director of Music and Band Artistic Director - Colonel Andrey Kapralov
- Conductor - Lieutenant Colonel Alexey Strenadko
- Conductor/Bandmaster - Major Vladimir Kolovanov
- Chief Ballet Master - Gennadiy Minkh

== Ensembles ==
- Brass Band
- Symphony Orchestra
- Wind Band
- Big Band (established in 1989)
- Ballet Ensemble (established in 1997)

== Events ==
The band is primary engaged in providing accompaniment for the Border Service of the FSB and takes part in leading social and cultural events both nationally and internationally.

- Defender of the Fatherland Day
- National Flag Day
- Victory Day (9 May)
- Russia Day
- Border Guards Day
- October Revolution Day

During its 50-year history, the band has also performed in countries such as Belarus, Tajikistan, Uzbekistan, Armenia, Latvia, Estonia, the United States, Germany, Poland, Austria and Norway.

== See also ==
- Border Service of the Federal Security Service of the Russian Federation
- Federal Security Service

Articles about related military bands:

- Military Band Service of the Armed Forces of Russia
- Central Military Band of the Ministry of Defense of Russia
- Military Band Service of the Ministry of Emergency Situations of Russia
- Military Band Service of the National Guard of Russia
- Police Band Service of the Ministry of Interior of Russia
