= Symphonic Band and Chorus of the Secretariat of the Navy of Mexico =

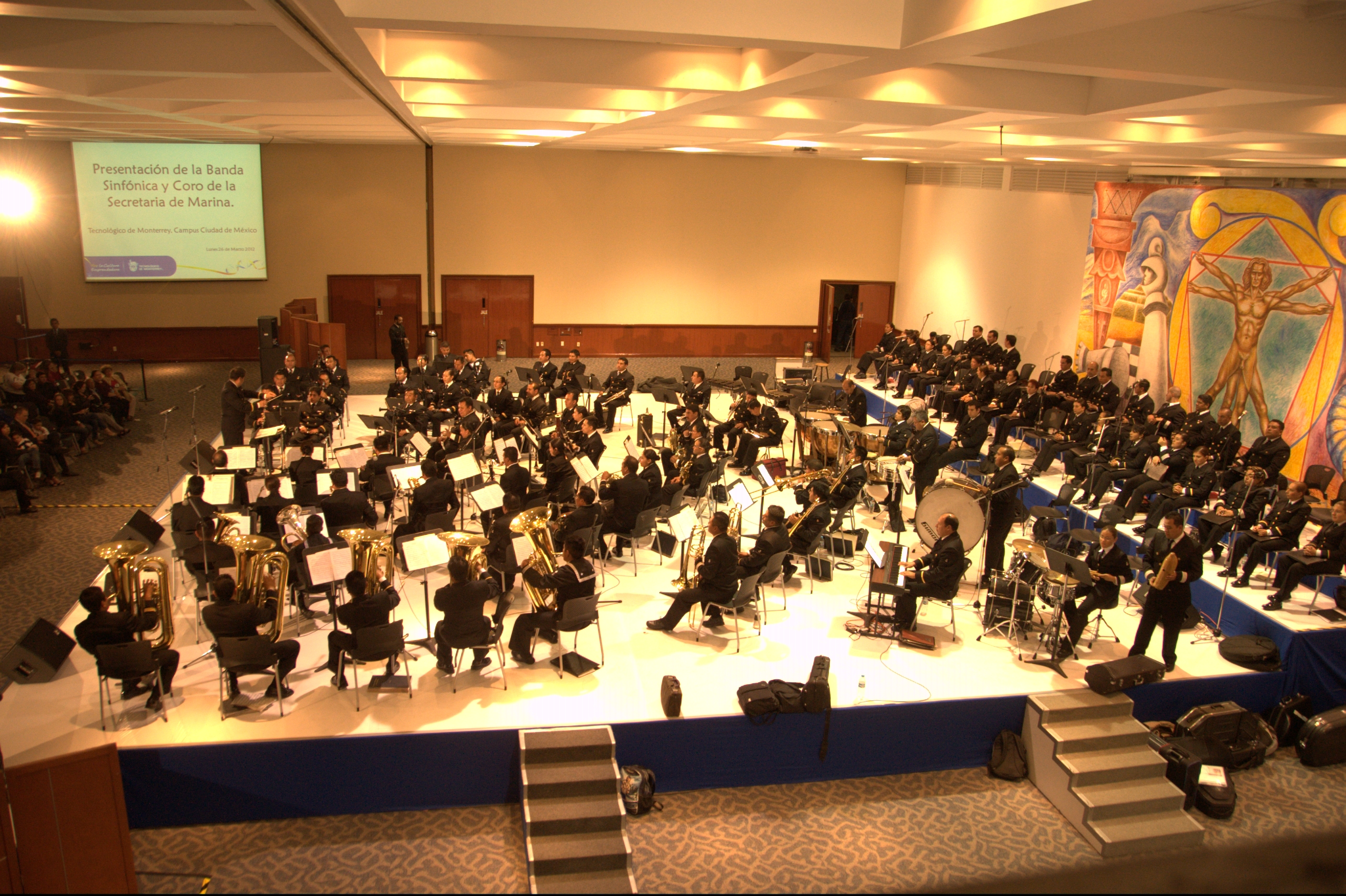
Appearance of the ensemble at the Monterrey Institute of Technology and Higher Education, Mexico City.

The Symphonic Band and Chorus of the Secretariat of the Navy of Mexico (Banda Sinfónica y Coro de la Secretaría de Marina Armada) is an ensemble of 120 musicians and singers whose members are professional musicians in the Mexican Navy. The band was founded by in 1941 and the chorus in 1993, to play music appropriate to the military mostly in Mexican venues but the ensemble has also played in various countries in North America and Europe. It gained international recognition in the late 1960s and early 1970s and participates in events for military bands.

== History ==
The symphonic band was established in 1941, by Contralmirante SMN Estanislao García Espinosa. Its purpose has been to perform music appropriate to the military. The chorus section was founded later in 1993 by Captain César Amora Aguilar. Today the orchestra and chorus consist of 120 members which generally perform together but the fifty member chorus has performed on its own as well. All members are professionally trained musicians who are members of the Mexican Navy who have attended schools such as Escuela Nacional de Música of UNAM, the Escuela Superior de Música and the Conservatorio Nacional de Música. The director and conductor of the orchestra is Narciso Bautista Gonzalez and the choral director is Ricardo Cordova Delgado. It has had guest conductors such as Julián Carrillo, Carl Alwin, Enrique Diemecke and Fernando Lozano. Noted soloists who have performed with it include pianist Edison Quintana, singer Carlo Morelli, trompetist Juan Manuel Arpero and marimba player Zeferino Nandayapa. The chorus has voices baritone, tenor, soprano, mezzo-soprano and bass voices, with noted singers being soprano Corbeta Sonia Jiménez Galván, bass Ricardo Galindo Gomez, tenor Joel Isaac Pererz Navarro and mezzo-soprano Cecilia del Carmen Gonzalez del Cano.

The ensemble gained international recognition with its performances at the 1968 Summer Olympics and the 1970 FIFA World Cup in Mexico. In 1976, it won first place at the Concurso Nacional de Bandas. In 1978, it won first place at the MILJAILR band competition in Sarajevo, competing with bands from Europe, Africa and the Middle East. In 1983 it won first place at the First Festival de Bandas Sinfónicas organized by INBA at the Auditorio Nacional in Mexico City. In 2007 it participated in the XII International Military Band Festival in Saumur, France. It participated in the World Military Music Festival in honor of the 40th anniversary of the Libyan Revolution in Tripoli in 2009. It also had an important tour in Mexico to celebrate the country’s bicentennial of its Independence and Centennial of the Mexican Revolution in 2010.The success the group has inspired the foundation of the military musical groups in Mexico such as the navy mariachi band.

== Performances ==
The ensemble gives between thirty and thirty five performances for about 80,000 people each year. It has mostly performed in all of the states of the Mexican Republic but it has also appeared in countries such as the United States, Canada, Guatemala, Belize, Portugal, Spain and Cuba. (ulsa) Important venues in which it has appeared include the Palacio de Bellas Artes, the Sala Nezahualcoyotl of the Universidad Nacional Autónoma de México in Mexico City and the Teatro Francisco Javier Clavijero in Veracruz. The ensemble prefers open venues for large audiences and never charges admission for its performances.

Its repertoire varies widely with both military and civilian works. Traditional works for orchestras and chorus include Baroque, classical and opera by composers such as Gustav Holst, Giuseppe Verdi, Carl Orff, Tchaikovsky, Juventino Rosas, Gaetano Donizetti, Mozart, Beethoven and Bach. The repertoire also includes traditional Mexican folk and popular music such as works by Agustín Lara, María Greever and Manuel Esperón with "Huapango" by José Pablo Moncayo a particular favorite with audiences. It also includes Broadway tunes, jazz, blues, pieces from Mexican and foreign films and symphonic versions of pop songs from overseas and local pop music hits such as those by the Beatles.
