= Gardemusik Wien =

Austrian military band

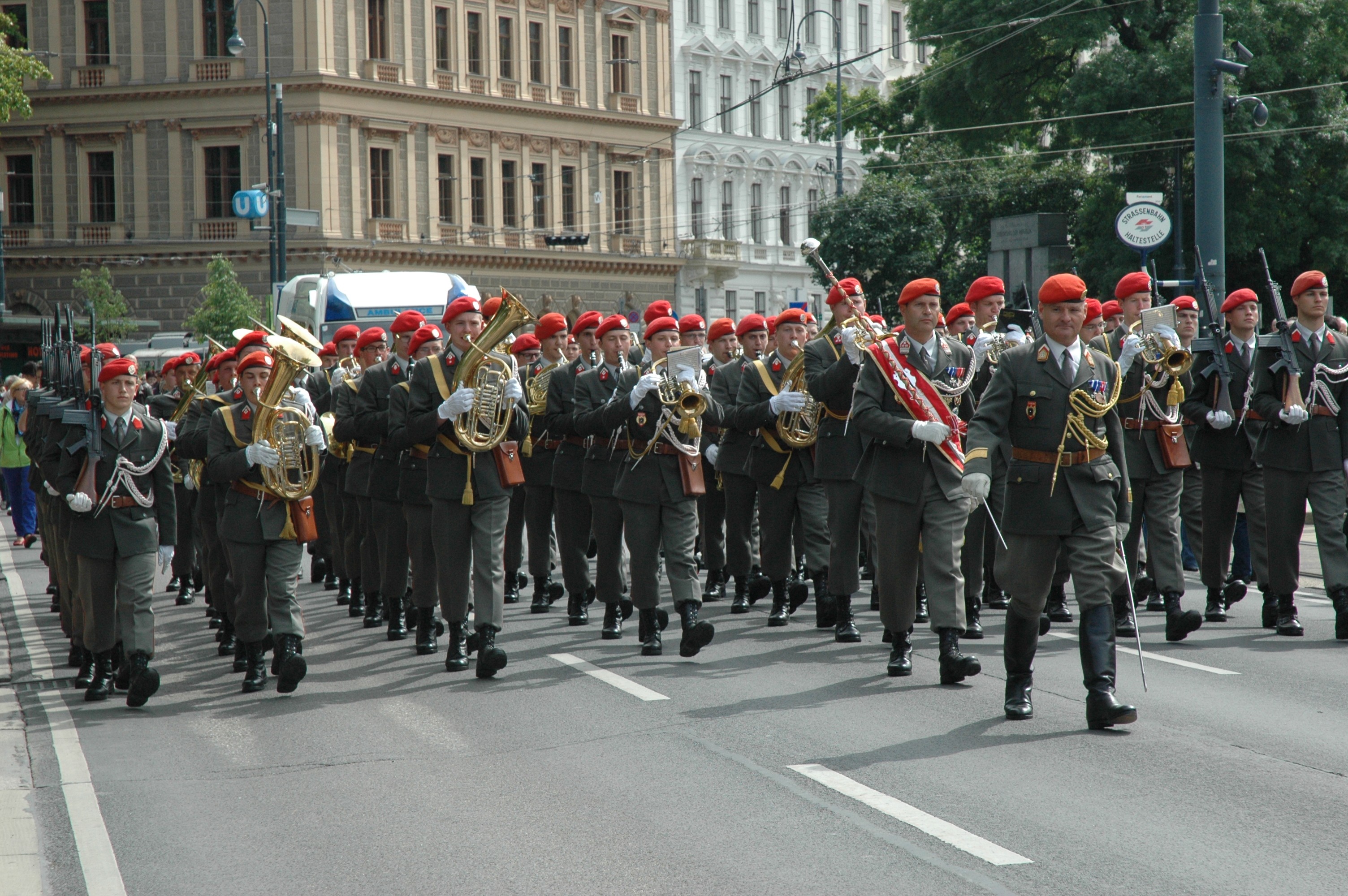
The Gardemusik at the 34th Austrian Brass Music Festival 2013 in Vienna

The Gardemusik Wien (Guards Band Vienna in English) is one of nine military bands in Austria and is the seniormost band in the Austrian Armed Forces. Unlike its German counterparts in the Bundeswehr, the band lacks a corps of drums, which is the most essential part to the German format. It consists of 60 military musicians who provide musical accompaniment to the Gardebataillon, of which it is the official regimental band.

== Brief history ==
It was created following the implementation of the Austrian State Treaty in September 1955. At the time of its creation, it was under the command of the Austrian national border guard department. It has been under the command of the Austrian Land Forces since January 1956, when the Army Battalion took over all representative tasks in Vienna. By May 1957, the regiment was renamed to the Guards Battalion, therefore branding the band as the Gardemusik. The Gardemusik was the only Austrian military band to not be affected by the reduction in staff and cuts to its budget by the government in October 2014. The Gardemusik carries out an annual 15-week training course new recruits.

== Tasks ==
The primary tasks of the Gardemusik are to provide support to ceremonial events such as accreditations of ambassadors, welcoming ceremonies, and parades and to conduct annual receptions for the diplomatic corps (mostly done by the symphonic wind orchestra). In addition to its main tasks, the Gardemusik produced over twenty recordings, in addition to military marches including recordings of works by Johann Strauss, Carl Michael Ziehrer and Joseph Lanner. The unit has a Sexennial tradition to compose a new military march in honor of the election of a new Federal President, which was more recently done for President Alexander Van der Bellen in 2017.

== List of leaders ==
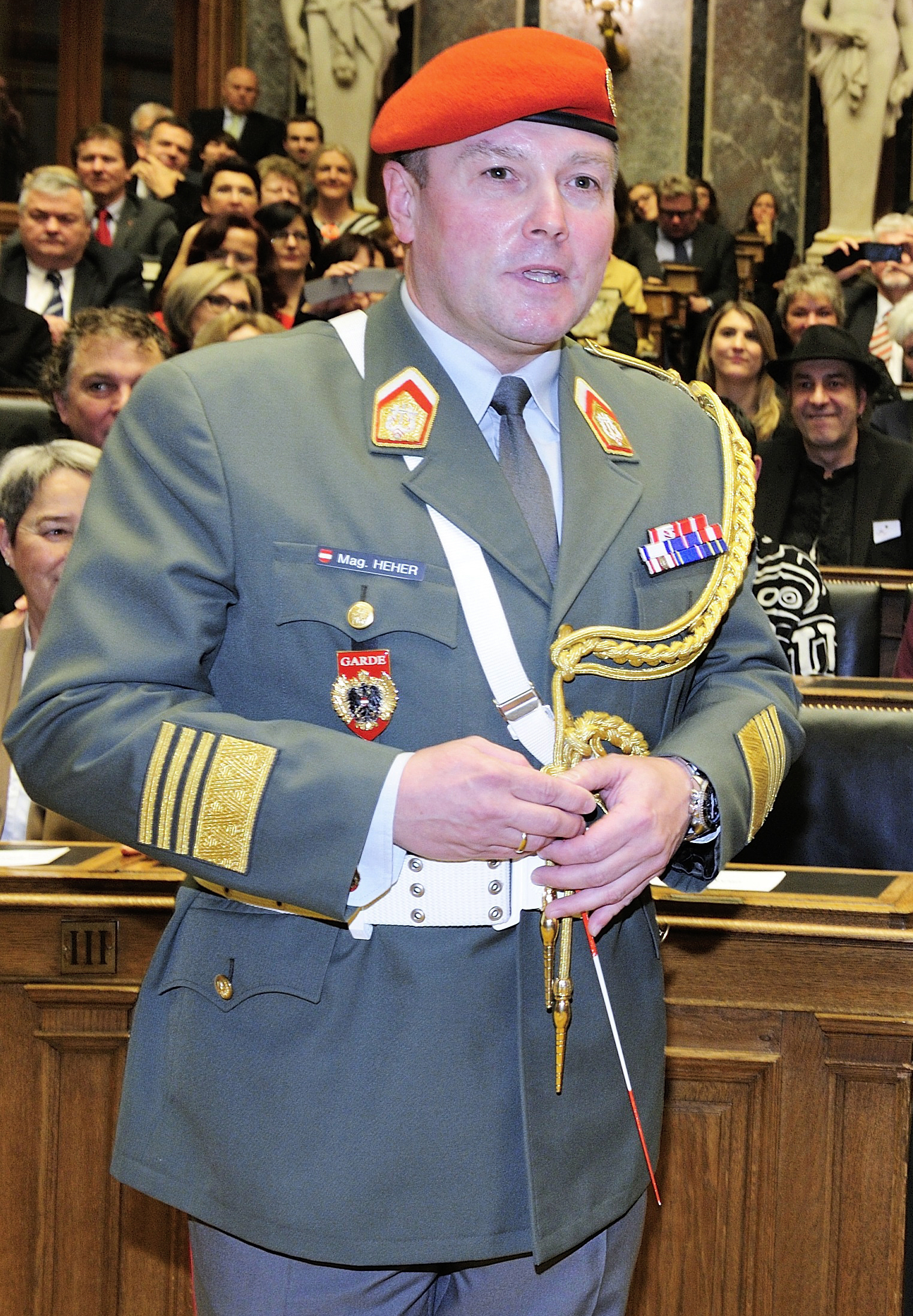
Colonel Bernhard Heher

The title of Director of Music (DOM) belongs to the highest-ranking officer in the band, who is the de facto leader of the band. Currently, this position is held by Colonel Bernhard Heher. The DOM is assisted by the deputy director and the bandmaster.

=== Directors of Music ===
- 1956–1960: Gustav Gaigg
- 1960–1971: Friedrich Hodick
- 1972–1975: Rudolf Bara
- 1975–2002: Johann Schadenbauer
- Since 2002: Bernhard Heher

=== Deputy Directors ===
- 1963–1965: Franz Josef Kohsich
- 1965–1968: Anton Sollfellner
- 1968–1969: Rudolf Bodingbauer
- 1969–1971: Rudolf Bara
- 1990–1995: Hannes Lackner
- 1997–2002: Bernhard Heher
- Since 2005: Johann Kausz

=== Bandmasters ===
- 1956–1960: Josef Hahn
- 1960–1974: Johann Bauerstätter
- 1975–1980: Josef Hain
- 1980–993: Hermann Auer
- 1993–2011: Josef Höller
- Since 2011: Gerald Springer

== Photos ==
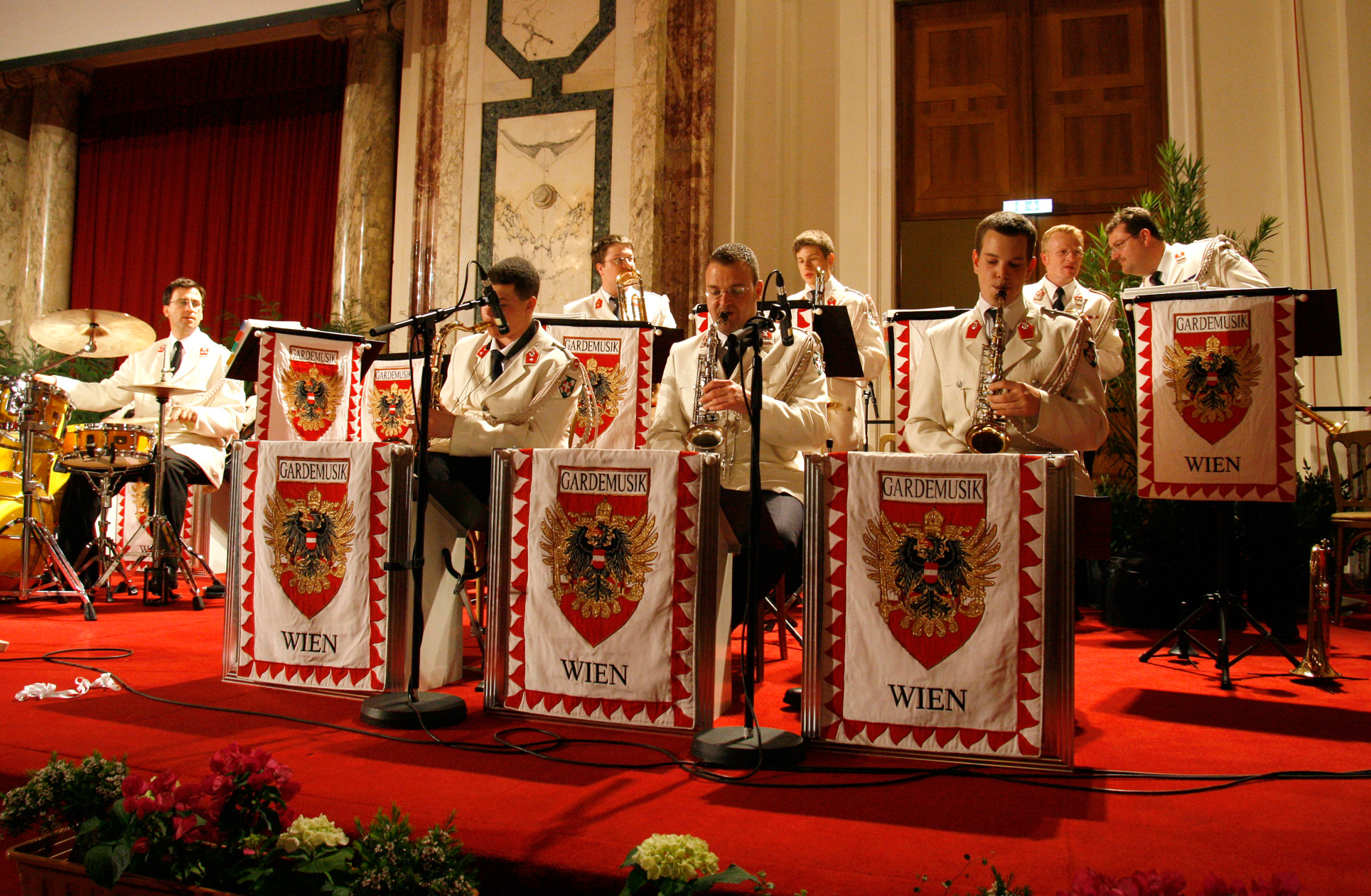

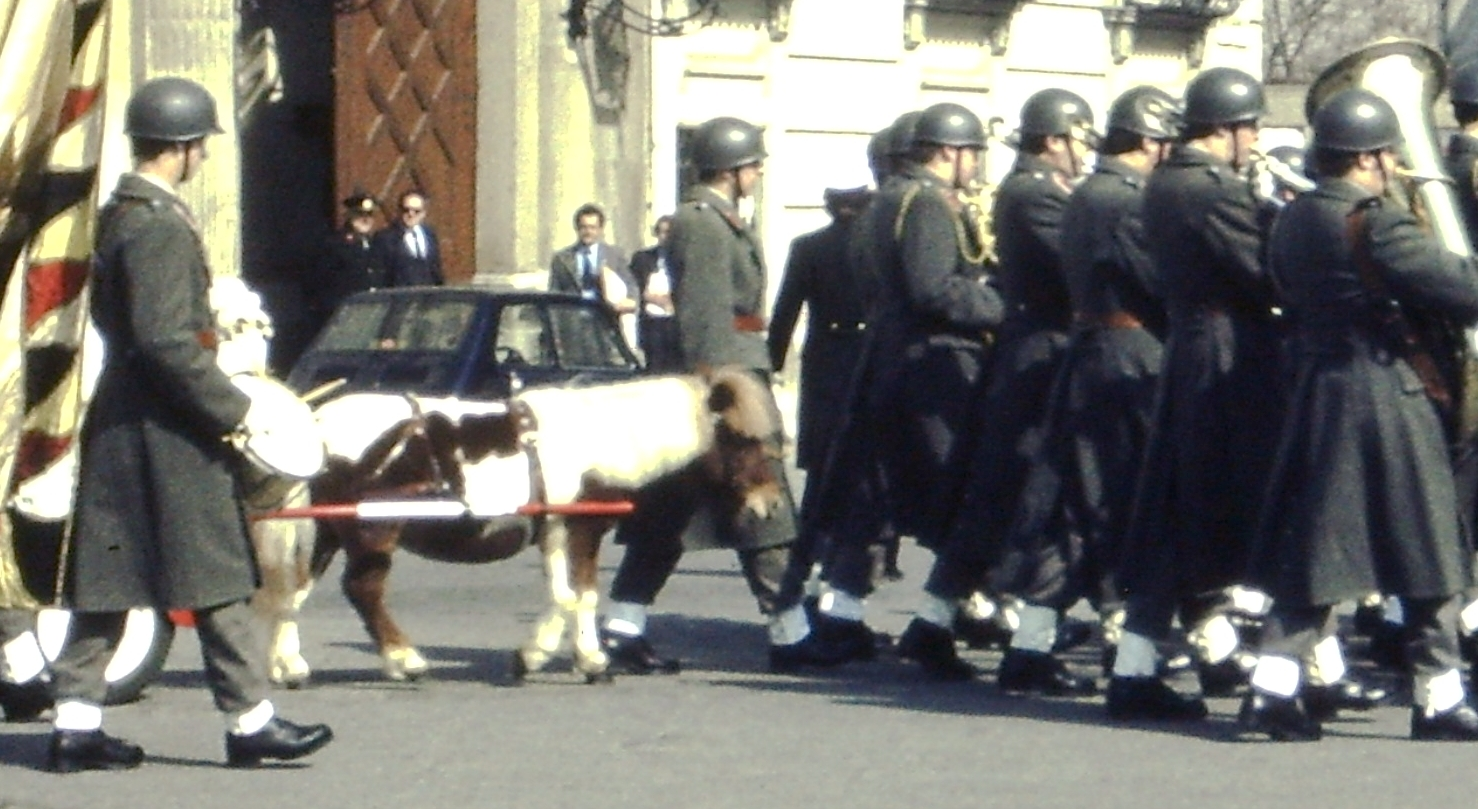

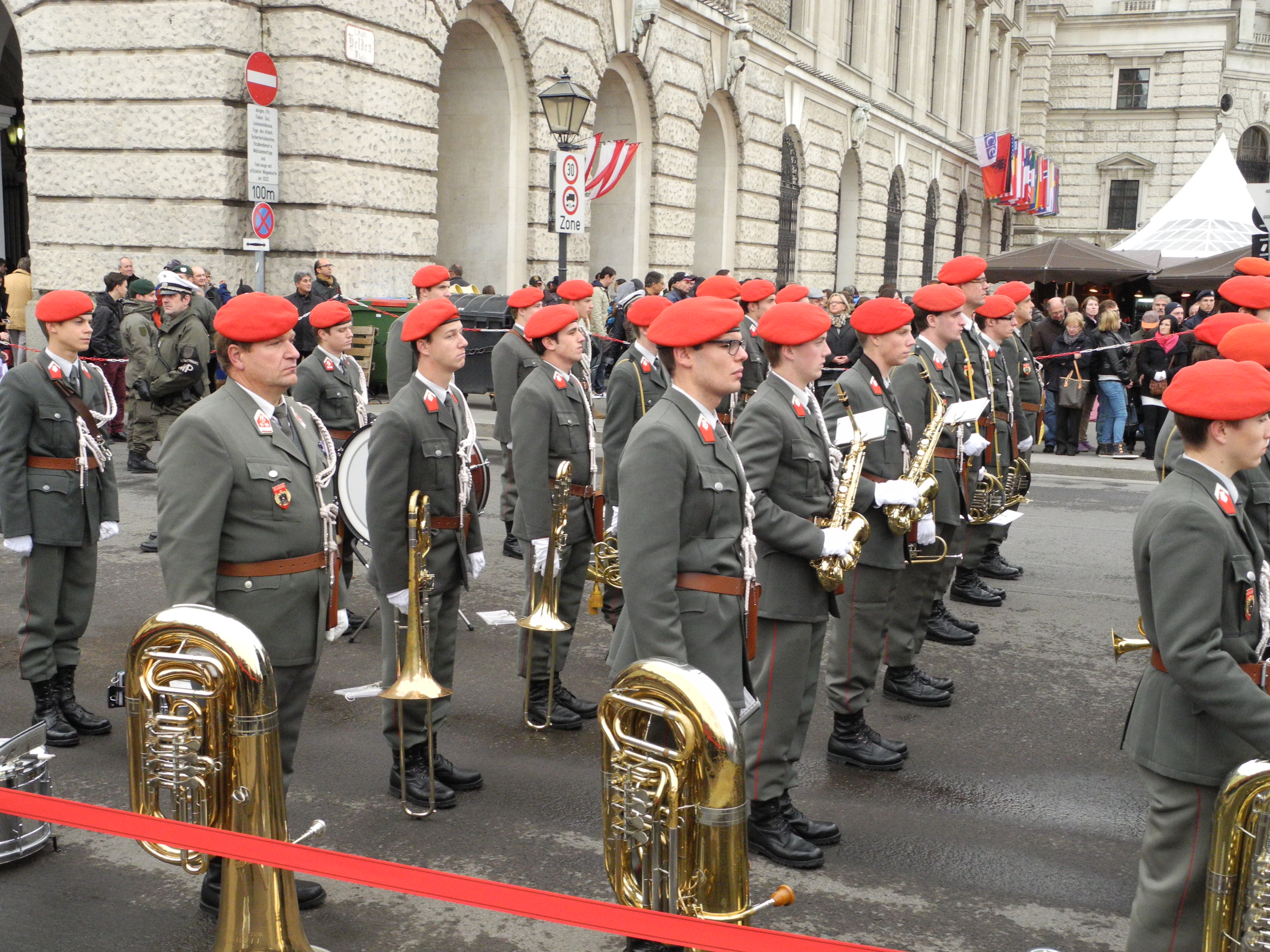

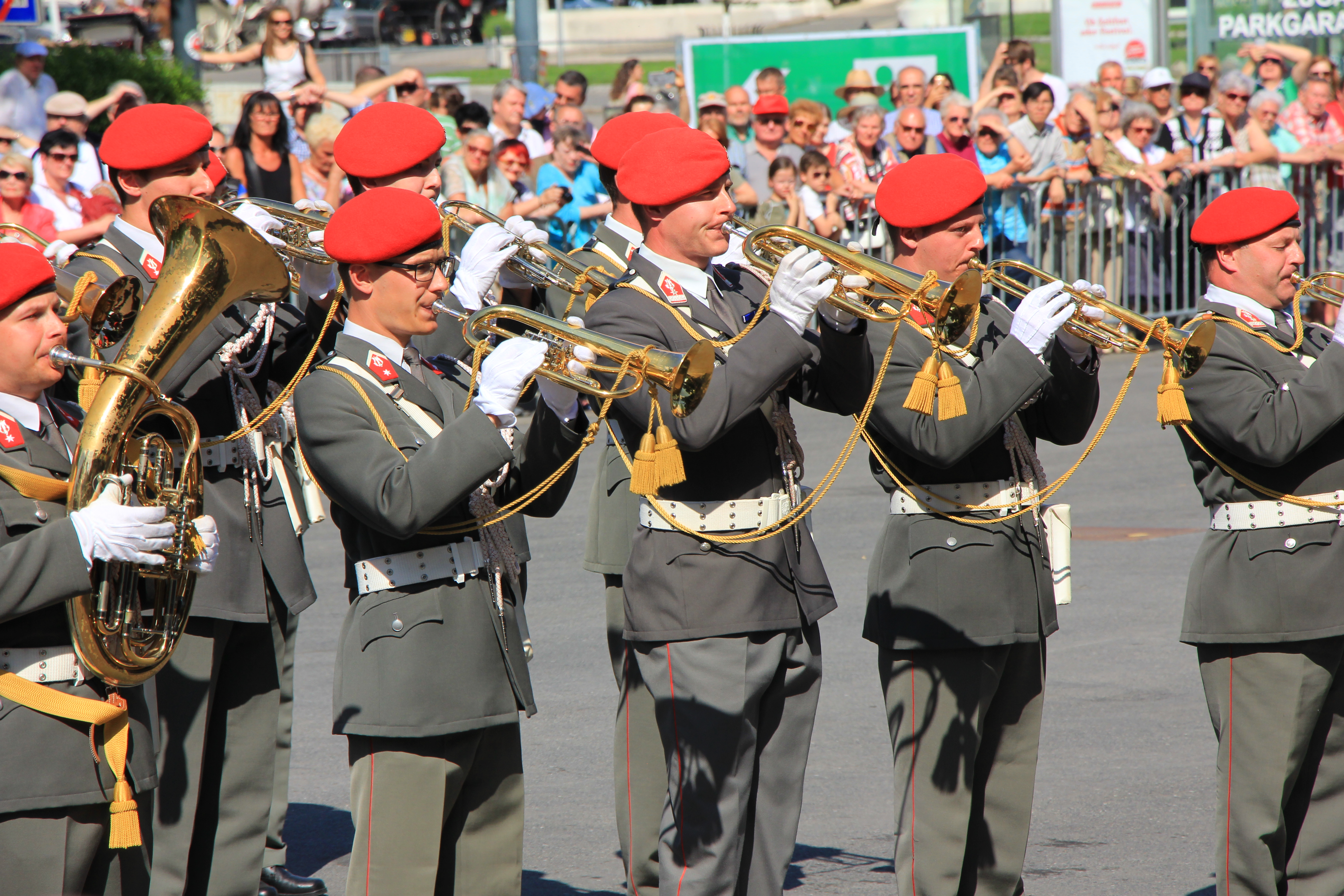

== See also ==
- Austrian Armed Forces
- Gardebataillon
- Military band
