= Military band =

Class of musical ensembles

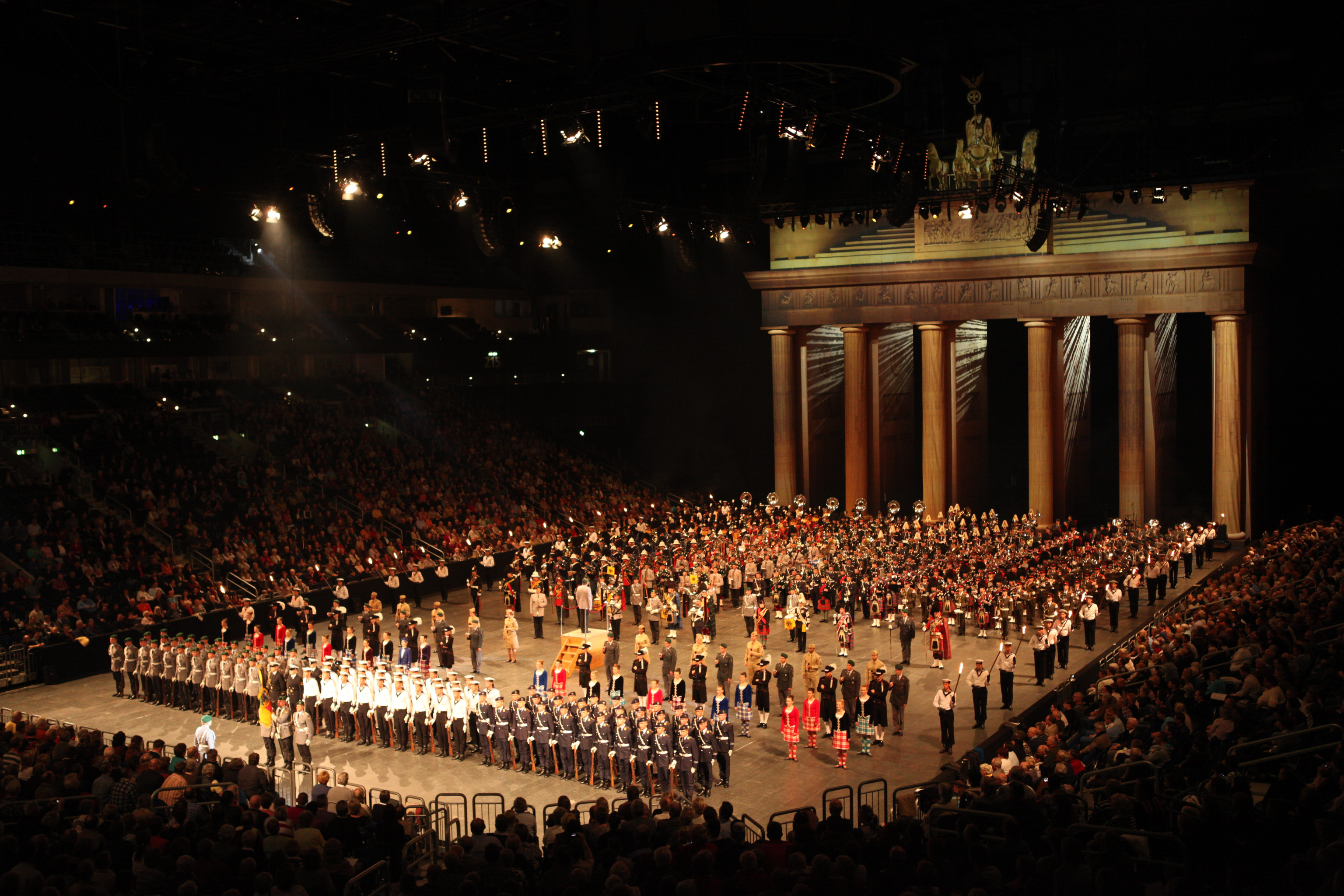
A massed group of military bands from several countries at the 2011 Berlin Military Tattoo

A military band is a group of personnel that performs musical duties for military functions, usually for the armed forces. A typical military band consists mostly of wind and percussion instruments. The conductor of a band commonly bears the title of bandmaster or music director. Ottoman military bands are thought to be the oldest variety of military marching bands in the world, dating from the 13th century.

The military band is capable of playing ceremonial and marching music, including the national anthems and patriotic songs of theirs and other nations, both while stationary and as a marching band. Military bands also play a part in military funeral ceremonies.

There are two types of historical traditions in military bands. The first is military field music. This type of music includes bugles (or other natural instruments such as natural trumpets or natural horns), bagpipes or fifes, and almost always drums. This type of music was used to control troops on the battlefield as well as for entertainment. Following the development of instruments such as the keyed trumpet or the saxhorn family of brass instruments, a second tradition of the brass and woodwind military band was formed. A third type, that of a mounted band, serves cavalry and sometimes artillery formations.

Some police forces have their own police bands that provide a similar function to that of a military band.

== History ==
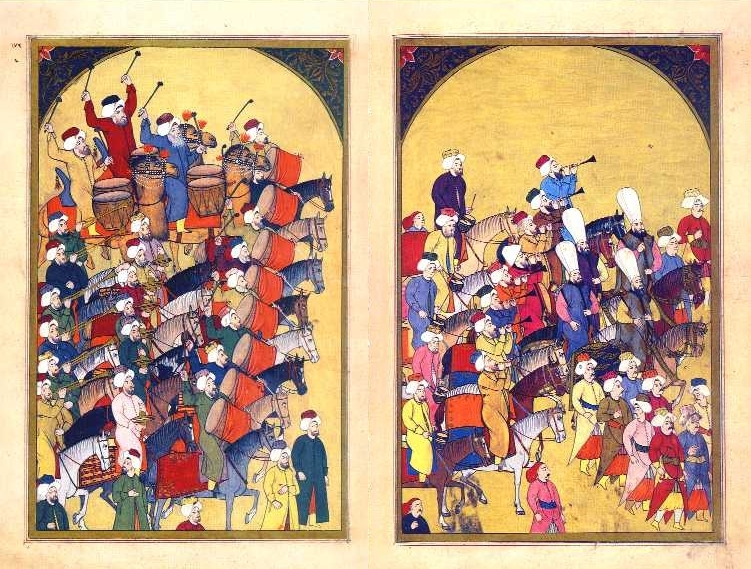
Depiction of the Ottoman military band in 1720. The notion of a military band originates from the Ottomans.

Military band instruments such as fife, drum, and bugle were historically used to communicate orders to soldiers in battle. 11th century book Diwan Lughat al-Turk mentions a prototype of the Mehtaran, as a "nevbet", Turkish military band tradition. Bands were formed by soldiers. 17th century traveler Evliya Çelebi noted that the Ottoman Empire had 40 guilds of musicians in the 1670s Istanbul. Ottoman military bands influenced European equivalents. Each regiment in the British Army maintained its own military band. Until 1749 bandsmen were civilians hired at the expense of the colonel commanding a regiment. Subsequently, they became regular enlisted men who accompanied the unit on active service to provide morale enhancing music on the battlefield or, from the late nineteenth century on, to act as stretcher bearers. Instruments during the 18th century included fifes, drums, the oboe (hautbois), French horn, clarinet and bassoon. Drummers summoned men from their farms and ranches to muster for duty. In the chaotic environment of the battlefield, musical instruments were the only means of commanding the men to advance, stand or retire. In the mid 19th century each smaller unit had their own fifer and drummer, who sounded the daily routine. When units massed for battle a band of musicians was formed for the whole.

== Functions and duties ==
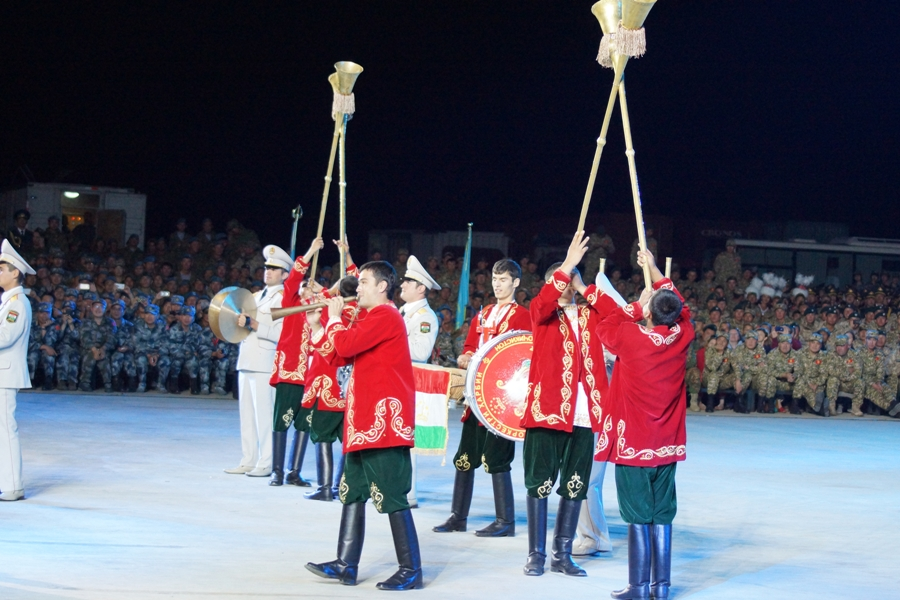
A Tajik military band with Karnays at a military tattoo at Zhurihe Training Base in China, 2014.

Military bands can vary in function and duties based on their specific mission. Bands may perform for a variety of reasons such as special events, military parades, military review, military tattoos, public relations, and troop entertainment. It may also play a role in boosting the esprit de corps or morale of the entire military, a particular service branch or a specific unit (usually regiment/brigade-sized at least).

Military bands play ceremonial and marching music, including the national anthems and patriotic songs. A concert band's repertoire includes original wind compositions, arrangements of orchestral compositions, light music, popular tunes and concert marches found in standard repertoire. Modern-day military musicians often perform a variety of other styles of music in different ensembles, from chamber music to rock and roll.

== Military bands in Africa ==
=== Algeria ===
Military bands take place in Algeria. The Algerian People's National Army maintains military bands in the country.

=== Angola ===
The Angolan Armed Forces maintains Portuguese-style military bands, primarily in the Army, Navy and Air Force and then in individual units of the FAA. The primary band is the 100-member Music Band of the Presidential Security Household, which is the official security service of the President of Angola. The music band of the Army Command was created on 16 June 1994. 4 years later, on 15 August 1998, the National Air Force created a music band within the artistic brigade. Outside the navy's marching band, the navy also has a small musical group known as Banda 10 de Julho (10 July Band), based at the Luanda Naval Base. All bands follow both the Portuguese and British precedent with the percussion at the front ranks of the band.

=== Cameroon ===
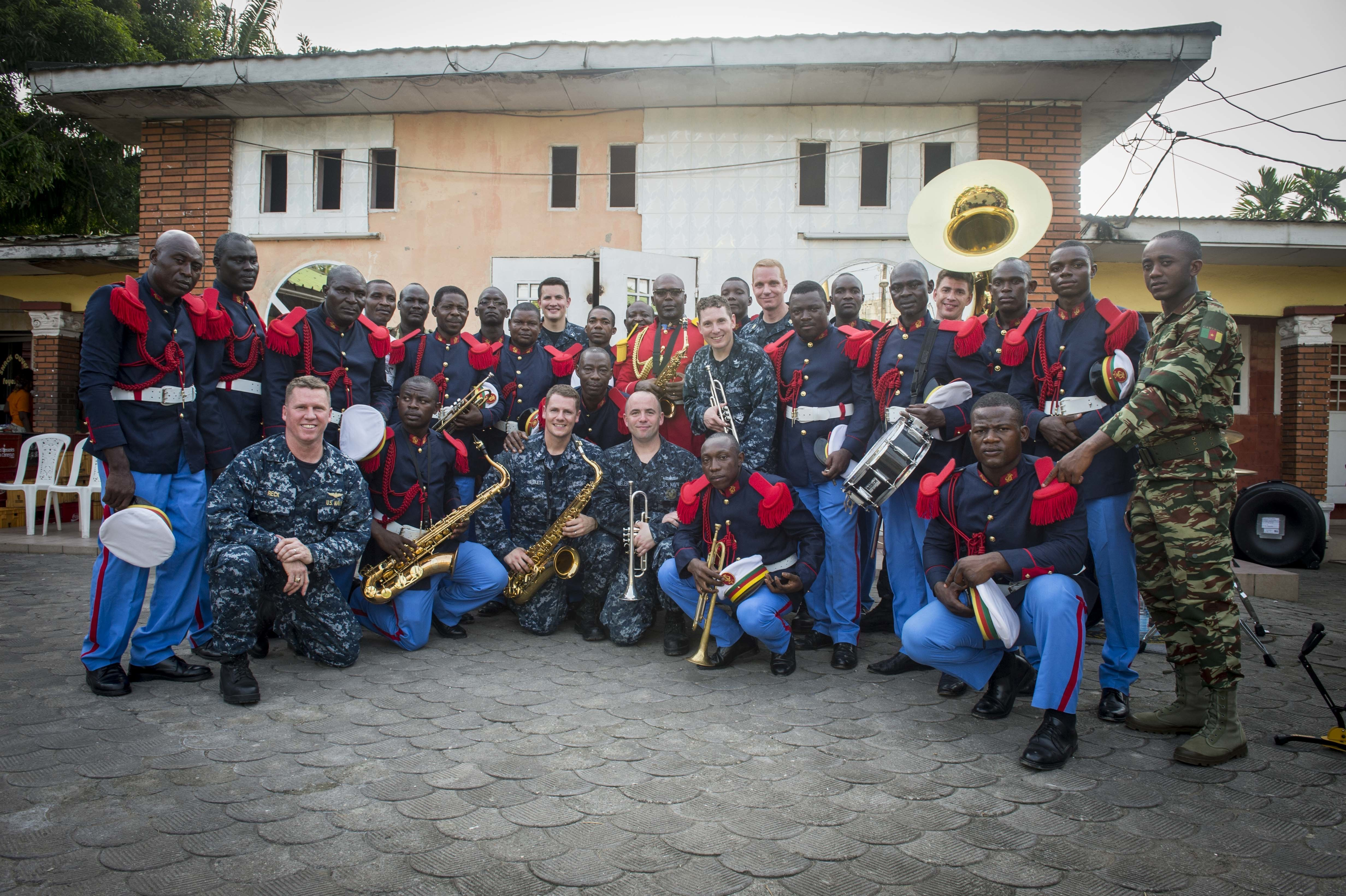
Cameroonian and American military band members in Douala, March 2015

Cameroonian military bands solely follow the French precedent for military music and military bands. The Yaoundé based Music Band Company of the Cameroonian Armed Forces under the baton of Captain Florent Essimbi is the main military band of the country. The band was founded in 1959, a year before Cameroon gained its independence, as purely a brass band company. Because of its increase in musicians it was upgraded to a musical section 10 years later. It has retained its current name since 2004. The band currently and has previously relied on its cooperation with the French Military and specifically its connections to musicians from the Conservatoire national supérieur de musique et de danse de Lyon. Other band include the Musique du Carroussel spécial de l'armée, the Musique de la Garde Présidentielle and the Musique de la gendarmerie.

=== Egypt ===
The Egyptian Armed Forces Symphonic Band is the main band of the Egyptian Armed Forces and was founded in 1838. They perform at many occasions like state visits, funerals, parades, and the annual graduation ceremony at the Egyptian Military Academy in Cairo, the capital of Egypt. They also have a pipe band division as well.

The band has been known for playing performances of national anthems quite poorly, such as when Angela Merkel, Vladimir Putin and François Hollande visited the country for a state visit.

During funerals, the band plays the Funeral March composed by Frédéric Chopin. Notable examples include the funerals of Anwar Sadat in 1981, the martyrs of the Attack On Rafah in 2012, Omar Soleiman in 2013, Hisham Barakat in 2015, Ahmed Zewail in 2016, Hosni Mubarak in 2020, and Jehan Sadat in 2021.

Instruments featured in the band include the Trombone, Tuba, Euphonium, Wagner tuba, French horn, Trumpet, Cornet, Clarinet, Bassoon, Saxophone, Western concert flute, Piccolo, Snare drum, Bass drum and the Cymbal.

=== Ethiopia ===
Although Ethiopia has a very long militarily history dating back to the Kingdom of Axum its bands were firstly of the French manner of a fanfare band. The first regular band was established by the early 20th century before the Italian invasion of the 1930s, based on the British and German tradition.

The first permanent military band in the country took the form of the Imperial Bodyguard Band (Kibur Zebegna) of the Ethiopian Empire, being formed in 1929 under Swiss conductor Andre Nicod. It originally consisted of just over a dozen uniformed musicians, majority coming from Welega province. Members of this band got their training originally from the Arba Lijoch fanfare band led by their Armenian bandleader Kevork Nalbandian. Notable members of the Imperial Bodyguard Band included Tilahun Gessesse and Mahmoud Ahmed, Bizunesh Bekele, Colonel Sahle Degago and many more. It was the first African nation to implement western style military music conventions. It came under the direct command of the Derg in the 70s and went into its current form in 1991.

Current marching bands in Ethiopia

Today the Ethiopian National Defence Force Band (ENDFB) (Amharic: የኢትዮጵያ ብሔራዊ መከላከያ ባንድ) is the central military band of the Ethiopian National Defense Force. With its headquarter in the Ethiopian capital city of Addis Ababa, it performs on ceremonial and state functions. Given the British influence, its current formation on parade is modeled on those of the British Army line infantry bands. It is composed of a marching band, a big band, a Corps of Drums, and a youth cadets section modeled on similar bands in the Commonwealth of Nations. It has received assistance from the British Royal Corps of Army Music, most recently between 2007 and 2012. The band itself has trained other marching bands in the country like the Tigray and Somalian marching bands.

In Addition to the EDFMB, there are some notable marching bands in Ethiopia, including:

- Amhara Regional State Police Marching Band
- Benishangul Gumuz Regional State Police Marching Band
- Tigray Regional State Police Marching Band
- Somali Regional State Police Marching Band
- Dere Dawa Youths Marching Band

=== Namibia ===
The Namibian Defence Force maintains many military bands throughout its service branches and even its own central band for the entire NDF. These bands followed the South African/British precedent due to the country's administration as South West Africa from 1915 to 1990. In recent years, it has gained a more German and Prussian tradition when marching and performing based on the country's 19th century colonial era as German South West Africa. Since the early 2000s, regular music training has been provided by the South African military. The Namibian Defence Force Brass Band is currently the country's most senior military band, having an area of responsibility out of its base in Windhoek. The Namibian Navy and the Namibian Marine Corps also maintain their own ceremonial brass bands.

=== Nigeria ===
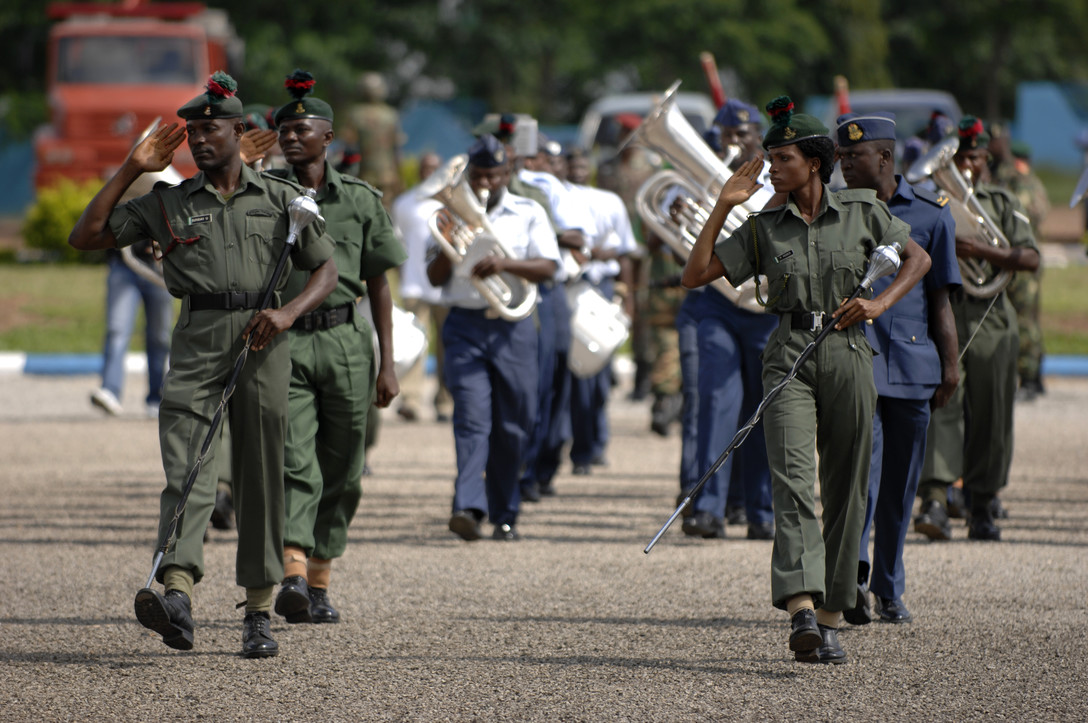
Military band in Nigeria

Nigerian military bands follow the British Household Division format and are heavily influenced and aided by British military bands. Military bands in Nigeria share similar practices with the Nigeria Police Band, which was considered to be the pioneer military band formation in the country, being established in 1892. Being mostly composed of buglers at the time of its founding, the band was originally composed of British servicemen, rather than native Nigerians. Over the years, however, the Nigerian Armed Forces have taken enormous steps to indigenize military bands due to the overuse of American and British military music and the exposure of the military to Nigerian art. Some of these steps include the establishment of the Nigerian Army School of Music (NASM) and the creation of new military music. Nigerian military bands are today under the command of the Nigerian Defence Headquarters in Abuja.

The Nigerian Army Band Corps (NABC), which provides official military records for the armed forces, is the most senior band service in the Nigerian Army and in the armed forces. Other bands maintained by the Nigerian Armed Forces outside the NABC include the Nigerian Air Force Band, the Nigerian Navy Band, and the Nigerian Defence Academy Band. The Nigeria Security and Civil Defence Corps Band also serves as a paramilitary band. The Nigerian Navy Band was established in 1963 months prior to the country becoming a republic. The Air Force Band was the most recent military band established, being founded in 1970. Enlisted musicians only joined a year later, and did not have its first director of music until 1975. On 9 April 2019, the NAF graduated its first set of pipers from an air base in Abuja who would later comprise the newly formed NAF Pipe Band. A pipe section can also be found in the Guards Brigade. Steel pans were introduced in the late 70s, with the NABC beginning the process of manufacturing steelpans and was the only steel band in the country until 2001. The Army School of Music in Ojo and the Navy School of Music in the Ota both provide musical instruction as it pertains to incoming musicians. In September 2019, Ibok Ekwe Ibas, the Chief of the Nigerian Naval Staff, announced plans for the Navy Directorate of Music to partner its foreign counterparts as well as the Music Society of Nigeria to improve its performances.

=== Senegal ===
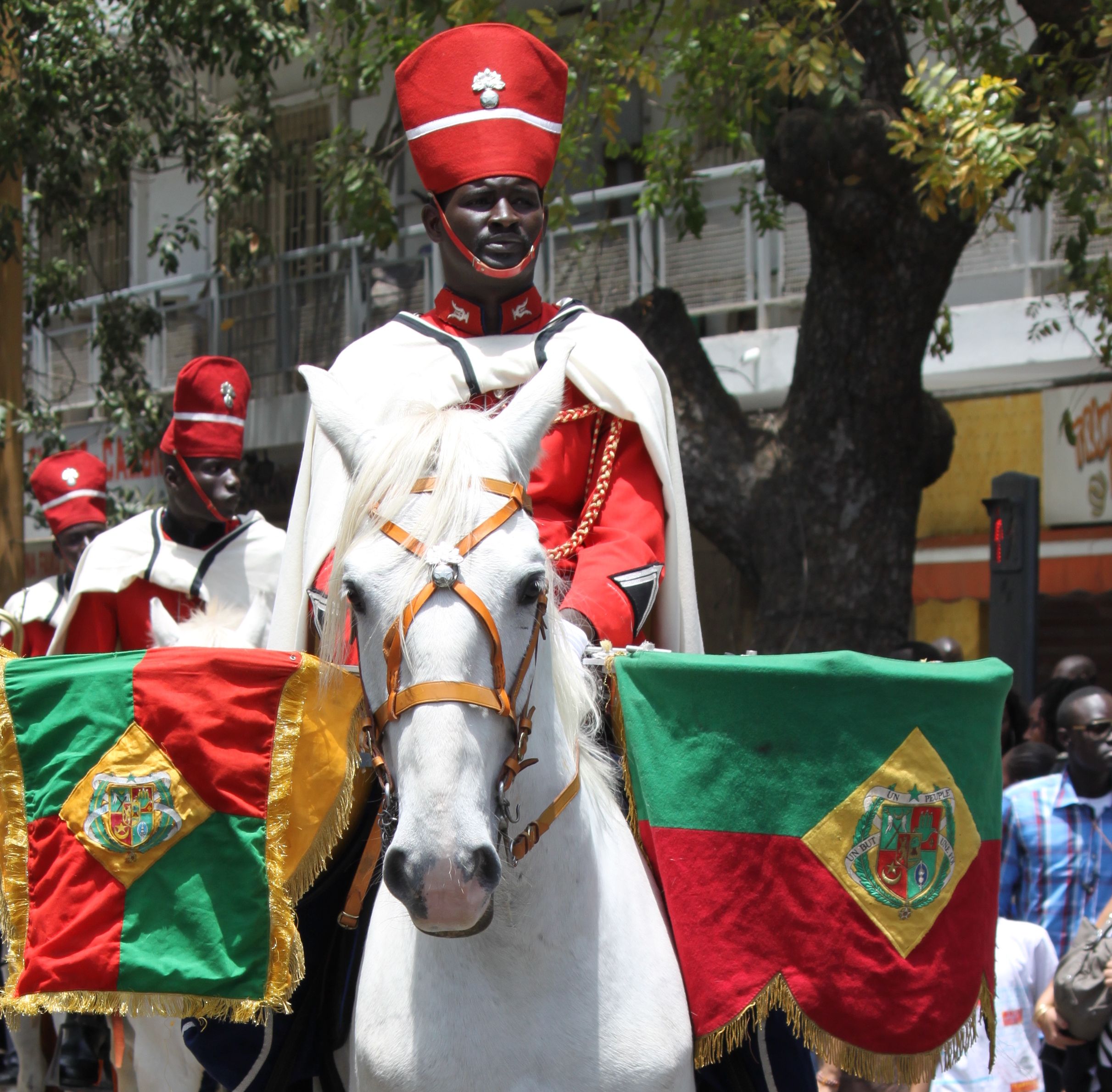
A Senegalese Timpini player in the Red Guard of Senegal

Like Cameroon and Niger, the Armed Forces of Senegal follows the French military band format in all of its musical formations. The Mounted Squadron of the Red Guard of Senegal, being the premier ceremonial unit of its 1st Infantry Regiment, maintains a 35-member mounted fanfare band similar to that of the French Republican Guard Cavalry. The mounted band leads the reset of the squadron in military parades and ceremonial processions in the capital of Dakar. Band musicians ride on white horses whose tails dyed red to match the official colors of the Red Guard.

The Armed Forces of Senegal is represented by a joint services band which, unlike the Red Guard mounted band, has a repertoire of a mix between Senegalese folk and classical music. This band was created in 1961 at the time of the founding of the armed forces and the independence of the country. The main music of the Senegalese Armed Forces was at the time formed by a majority of newly recruited young people with no musical knowledge. It was then necessary to count on the Captain Jean Avignon who directed, for 12 years, the Paris-based Musique des Troupes de Marine. Its official duties were prescribed in November 1981. The Senegalese Gendarmerie also maintains its own fanfare band.

=== Sierra Leone ===
During colonial rule in Sierra Leone, the army music unit was the Band of the 1st Battalion, Royal Sierra Leone Regiment. Mustapha Sahr "Big" Fayia formed an army dance band in 1965 from soldiers in the newly formed armed forces. It earned money by playing concerts at home and abroad, winning in 1978 the top band prize with their performance at the World Festival of Youth in Havana. The Republic of Sierra Leone Armed Forces today maintains a marching band organized in the British format.

=== South Africa ===
There are currently 9 main military bands currently under the auspices of the South African National Defence Force (SANDF) that are spread across the four different branches of the SANDF (Army, Navy, Air Force, Health Service). Outside of marching bands, which follow the British influence, the SANDF also follows the British/Commonwealth precedent for utilizing pipe bands, with some of the most notable pipe and drums coming from the Transvaal Scottish Regiment. Since 1969, the South African Army is currently represented in musical support by the Corps of Bandsmen, a military band service that presides over the country's five military bands and the National Ceremonial Guard (NCG) Band. The South African Navy Band, the South African Air Force Band and the South African Military Health Service also operate in the country to represent their own branches.

=== Uganda ===
The Uganda People's Defence Force sports a military band for each of the three services: Army, Air Force and Special Operations Command. All bands follow the British precedence. The senior band is the UPDF Band, part of the army, which serves ceremonial duties in Kampala. In the 1970s, military bands under President Idi Amin gained official sponsorship grew as a result.

=== Zimbabwe ===
The Zimbabwe Defence Force (ZDF) maintains multiple military bands that are based on the British pattern. The two main bands are the Zimbabwe National Army Band (shortened to the Zim Army Band) and the Air Force of Zimbabwe Band. The latter band has a traditional Hosho player serving in its ranks. A smaller band, Crocodile Sounds, is part of the Mechanized Brigade. The ZDF also maintains the Military School of Music (MSM), currently based at Imbizo Barracks in Bulawayo. In the now dissolved Rhodesian Security Forces, musical duties were provided by the Band and Drums of the Rhodesian African Rifles, notably led by Captain Ken MacDonald, composer of Rise, O Voices of Rhodesia, the Rhodesian anthem. A military band was also maintained by the Rhodesian Corps of Signals.

== Military bands in the Americas ==
Given the history of the military forces in the Americas, the military band heritage in this part of the world is a mix of various traditions, primarily drawn from Europe. Countries in the Americas belonging to the Commonwealth of Nations are generally modelled after their British counterparts. Trinidad and Tobago take this tradition a bit further with the use of steelpans in its bands. Military bands throughout Latin America draws influence from the military bands found in France, Germany, Portugal, Italy, and Spain. However, Haiti remains the only state in the region whose military bands are primarily modelled after the French.

=== Argentina ===
Argentina has longstanding connections with Germany, and their army bands reflect these traditional links. At the beginning of the 20th century, there was an exchange of marches between the Imperial German Army and the Argentine Army: Germans gave Argentines Alte Kameraden, while Argentines gave Germans the Marcha de San Lorenzo, which was used in 1940 during the victory parade on the Champs Elysées following the defeat of France. Argentine military bands have field drummers and occasionally buglers and fifes (as is the case with the Tacuari Drummer military band of the Regiment of Patricians, which has two fifers) accompanying the main band.

Three bands belong to the oldest cavalry, artillery and infantry regiments of the Argentine Army, using band formations modeled on German and Italian traditions. All of them report to the Buenos Aires Garrison Command and are administrative, as with the other bands, fall under the Inspectorate General of Military Music.

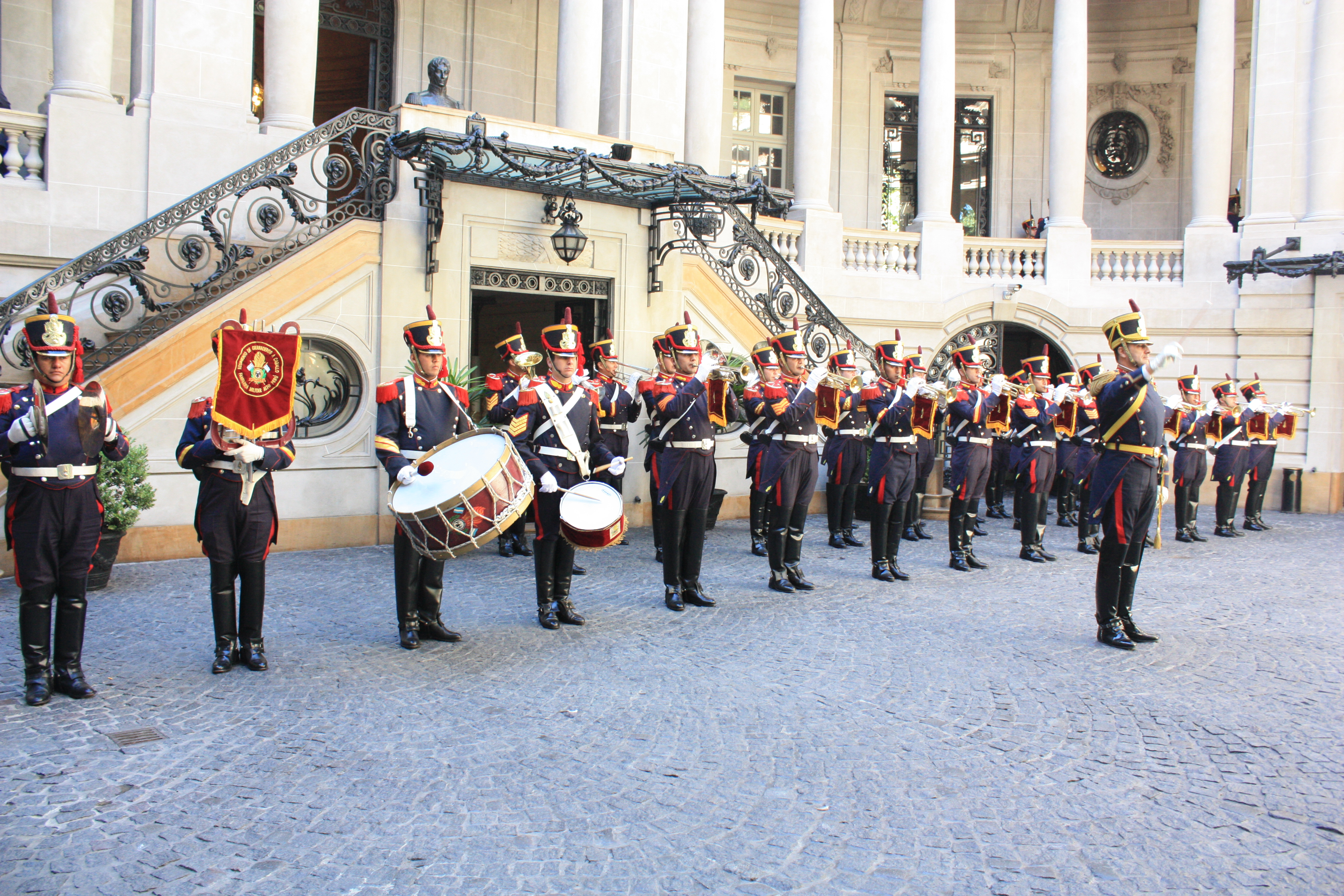
The Alto Peru Fanfare Band of the Argentine Regiment of Mounted Grenadiers is an all-brass mounted band.

- The Alto Peru Fanfare Band of the Argentine Regiment of Mounted Grenadiers is an all-brass mounted band using the brass and percussion instruments (and formerly bugles). The ceremonial uniform design dates from 1813, and this band serves the President of Argentina.
- The Tambor de Tacuari Band is the "Regiment of Patricians's regimental band. This regiment is the oldest and most prestigious Argentine line infantry regiment. Musicians wear the 1806 regulation uniform originally worn by the regiment when it was raised in response to the British attack on Buenos Aires. The Patricios formally represent the Federal Capital as its honor band.
- The Ituzaingó Band of the 1st Artillery Regiment "Brigadier General Tomas de Iriarte" is the official honor band of the Argentine Ministry of Defense. The band wears uniforms worn by Argentine gunners during the Argentina-Brazil War and later conflicts, with pith helmets as a headdress.

Another notable band of the Argentine Army is the Mounted Band of the 4th Armoured Cavalry Regiment (Mountain) "General Lavalle's Cuirassiers". They wear uniforms similar to those of the French Republican Guard Cavalry and 19th-century cuirassier units. This band uses the same brass and percussion instruments as in the Mounted Grenadiers, when either mounted or dismounted. There are currently 54 bands in the army. Other bands in the Army include:

- Band of the Colegio Militar de la Nación
- Band of the Army NCO School "Sergeant Cabral"
- Band of the General Jose de San Martin Military Academy
- Band of the General Manuel Belgrano Military Academy
- Band of the 16th Infantry Regiment "Andes Rifles"
- Band of the 10th Armored Cavalry Regiment "Pueyrredón Hussars"
- Band of the 6th Armored Cavalry Regiment "Blandengues"
- Band of the 5th Light Cavalry Regiment "General Martin de Güemes"
- Band of the 22nd Mountain Infantry Regiment "Lieutenant Colonel Juan Manuel Cabot"

The Argentine Navy fields the Navy Staff Band, the Band of the Argentine Naval Academy and the Band of the Argentine Navy NCO School. The Navy Staff Band is particularly unique that aside from buglers it also sports a bagpipe section. Representing the Argentine Air Force are the Band of the Argentine Air Force Academy, the Band of the Argentine Air Force NCO Academy, and the 1st Air Brigade Band.

Military-styled police bands are present in both the Argentine National Gendarmerie and the Argentine Naval Prefecture.

=== Barbados ===
The Barbados Defence Force Band (also known as the Zouave Band), is an element of the reserve units that are composed of members of The Barbados Regiment and the Barbados Defence Force.

=== Bolivia ===
In Bolivia, the use of the Turkish crescent with the addition of vertical banners and standards is standard practice in its military bands (only the Bolivian Navy fields bagpipers and fanfare trumpeters in its bands), while the drumline is stationed at the front of the ensemble, thus following both German and French practice. The bands of the Bolivian Colorados Regiment, the presidential guard infantry regiment, and of the Bolivian Army Military Music School are both designated as the country's most senior military bands of the Bolivian Armed Forces. The Military Music School (Escuela Militar de Musica del Ejercito) was created by Supreme Decree on 20 May 1889. Today the anniversary of the school is celebrated on 20 May of each year. In 1951, it received the honorific "Lt. Col. Adrián Patiño". It wears the service dress with the peaked cap. In addition the Band of the Military College of Bolivia served as the senior band of the military educational institutions, having been established in the early 20th century. The Band follows the Prussian precedent with the wearing of the Prussian-styled full dress on parades. Two additional regimental bands wear War of the Pacific era full dress in the Army (the bands of the 2nd Infantry Regiment and the 3rd Infantry Regiment).

A number of Army regimental bands wear either battle dress or combat dress uniform on parade, with combat helmets as headdress for the bandsmen. There's only one mounted brass band.

Bands are also mounted by the Bolivian Navy and Air Force. As a general rule the bandsmen of these two services wear the service full dress uniform on parade, regardless of rank held (the Navy has an exception, as US dixie hats are worn with the full dress by bandsmen who are in lower-ranked ratings).

=== Brazil ===
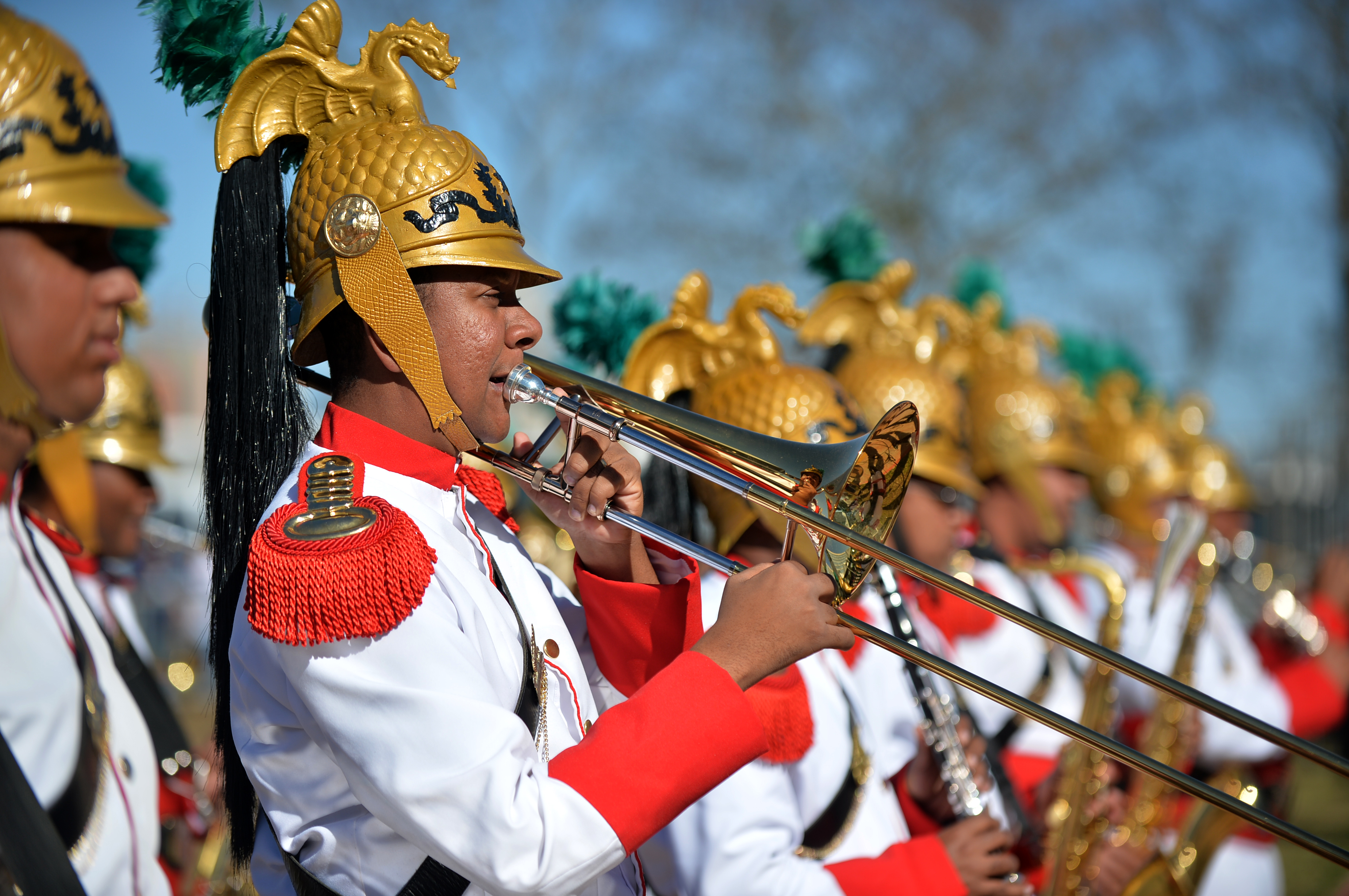
The Military Band of the Independence Dragoons (1st Cavalry Regiment), the official presidential band of Brazil and one of two senior bands under the Brazilian Army.

Brazilian military bands descend from the small unit bands of the Portuguese Army in what was then Colonial Brazil. The last of these bands was the Band of the Brigada da Real da Marinha. The Armed Forces of the Empire of Brazil kept this tradition alive through the 19th century. Military bands became more common from the 1840s on, expanding into services such as military corps and the National Guard. Since the late 1940s, the Brazilian Marine Pipes, Drum and Bugle Corps uses brass (formerly bugles) and percussion instruments, as well as bagpipes and fifes. They represent both the Brazilian Marine Corps and the Brazilian Navy in all activities it participates. Its formation mirrors Portuguese and Italian military band traditions, as well as those of the United States drum and bugle corps of the early 20th century.

The Brazilian Marine Corps also fields for public duties the Brasilia Marine Corps Band and the Central Band of the Marine Corps. Other military bands include those of the Presidential Guard Battalion, the Independence Dragoons, and the Brazilian Air Force Academy Band. The band for the Presidential Guard Battalion is the only band in the Brazilian Army to include both a pipe band section and a drum corps. Personnel from both the Presidential Guard Battalion Band and the Band of the Independence Dragoons form part of the newly formed Army Marching Band and Pipes and Drums, formed in 2016. The Brazilian Marching Band and Pipes and Drums is composed of 74 musicians who play instruments ranging from instruments for marching bands to traditional instruments. Individual military units operate music bands. Currently, the 3rd Army Division Music Band serves one of the largest military garrisons in the country. Military bands are also active both in the Military Police and the Military Firefighters Corps, one of the most notable of which being the Symphonic Band of the Military Police of Paraná State.

=== Canada ===
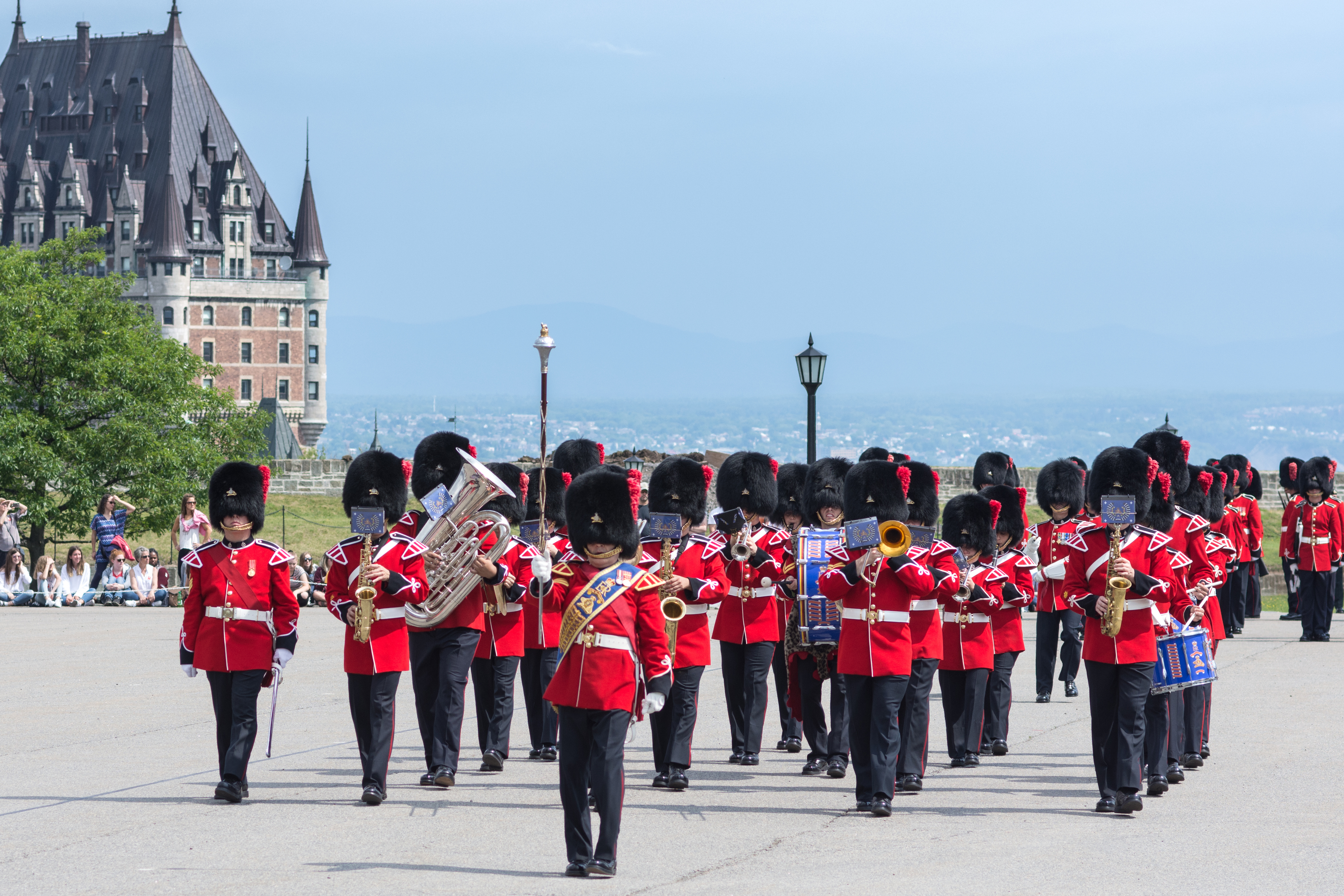
The band of the Royal 22nd Regiment at the Citadelle of Quebec, in 2018. The band is one of 59 bands in the Canadian Armed Forces.

Years of French and later British rule made their imprint in the creation of the Canadian military band tradition. The Music Branch of the Canadian Armed Forces is composed of six full-time bands of the Regular Force, and 53 part-time bands of the Primary Reserve. These bands serve the Canadian Army, Royal Canadian Navy and the Royal Canadian Air Force. The Music Branch includes both concert bands, made up of brass, percussions, and woodwind instruments; and pipe and drum bands, formerly the Branch provided corps of drums and drum and bugle corps for ceremonial duties.

In addition to the bands of the Regular Force and Primary Reserve, the Royal Military College of Canada also maintains a pipe and drum bands. The Canadian Cadet Organizations, a youth program sponsored by the Canadian Forces, also maintain their own bands. Bands of Cadets Canada are modeled after their respective sponsored service branch.

=== Chile ===
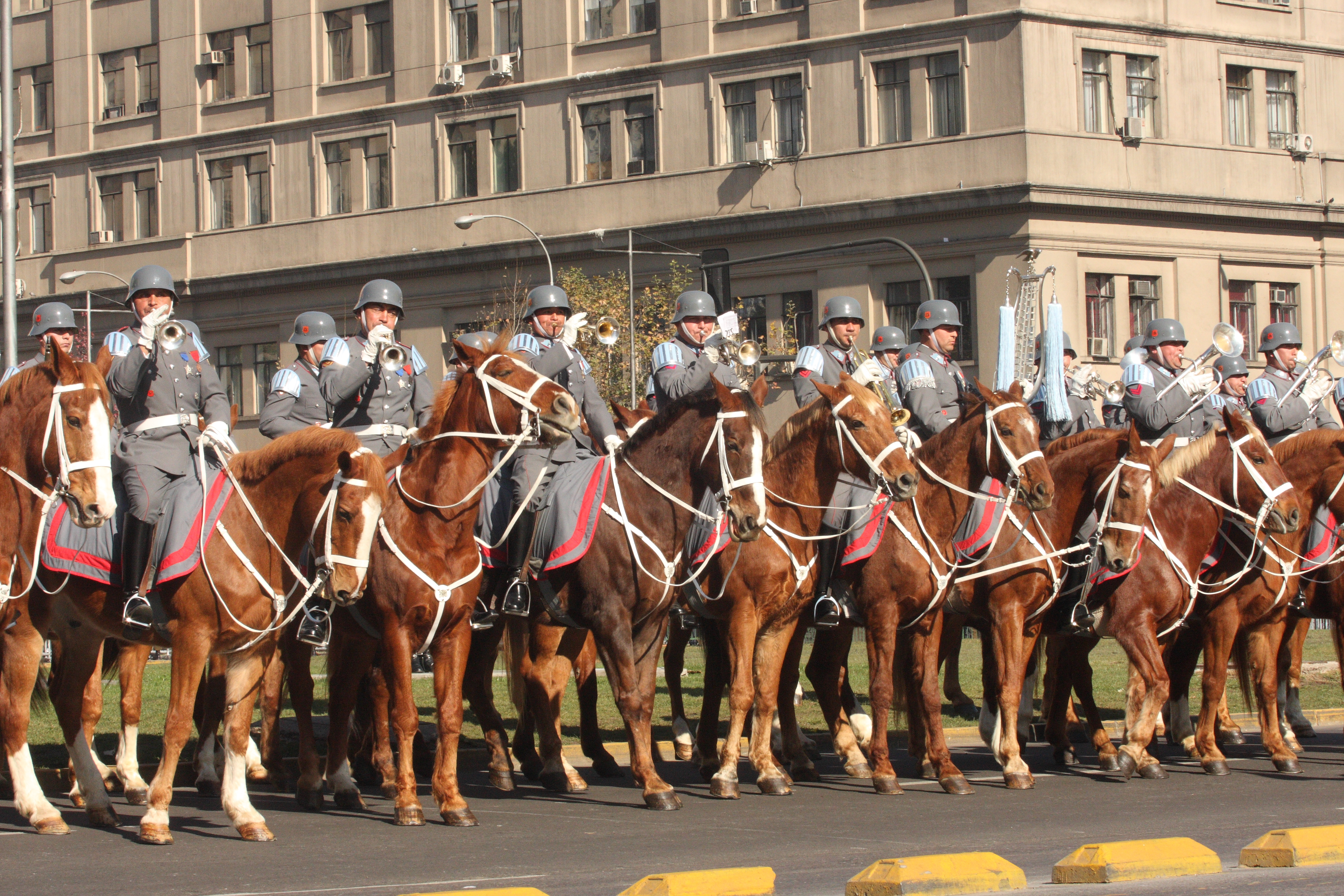
A mounted military band of the Chilean Army, in 2011

Two Chilean mounted bands are of high interest: the Mounted Band and Bugles of the 1st Cavalry Regiment "Grenadiers" and the Band and Bugles of the 3rd Cavalry Regiment "Hussars" of the Chilean Army. Other bands include the band of the Army NCO School and the Bernardo O'Higgins Military Academy, also of the Chilean Army, the Band of the Chilean Marine Corps Basic School, the Band of the Arturo Prat Naval School and the Band of the Naval Politechnical Academy, all of the Chilean Navy and the National Band of the Carabineros. Band formations on parade, mounted bands included, follow the German model, however only the Chilean Air Force Symphonic Band does not participate - the service is represented on parade by the Bands of the Captain Manuel Avalos Prado Air Force Academy and the Air Forces Specialities School. Another band formation and one with increasing public awareness is the military band of the Chilean Gendarmerie, which reports to the Ministry of Justice.

Military bands in Chile have the same instrumentation with added bugles on the Corps of Drums, as German military bands, with a few unique additions (a remnant of the former French influence in the armed forces). Another distinguishing feature is the presence of the Turkish crescent in the military bands when they are on parade and the band's conductor being assisted by a bugle major.

=== Colombia ===
The Military Forces of Colombia and the National Police of Colombia sport military bands and drum and bugle corps with formations similar to those in the United States, Italy, Germany and France. Military bands first reached Bogotá in the 16th century and were developed into active musical ensembles in the 20th century. In the late 1890s, military bands in the country were implemented based on the French model of these ensembles. The 37th Infantry Presidential Guard Battalion of the National Army of Colombia maintains a military band and a corps of drums unit that serves under the command of the President of Colombia at his/her residence at the Casa de Nariño. Pipe bands are also used in the Colombian Navy's educational institutions (the Admiral Jose Prudencio Padilla Naval Academy and the Marine Basic School). The Military Symphonic Band of the Colombian Air Force (founded in November 1987) consists of male and females NCOs, many of which are part of the Band of the NCO School "Captain Andrés M. Díaz", which wears the service full dress and marches with the school drum and bugle corps.

=== Cuba ===
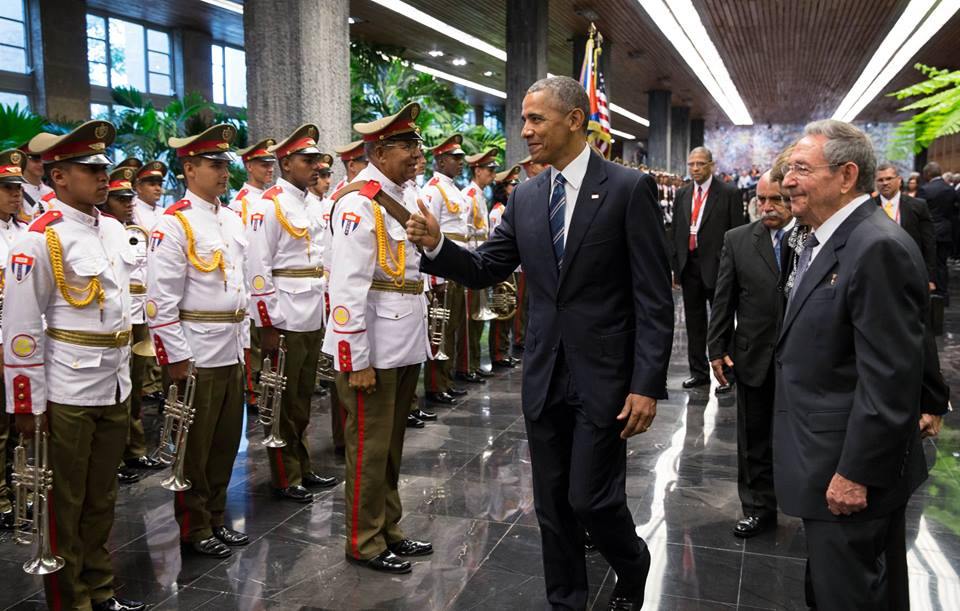
Barack Obama and Raúl Castro meeting with members of the Cuban Revolutionary Armed Forces Band.

Since the late 1960s, the tradition of the Cuban Revolutionary Armed Forces Military Bands Department has been based mostly on the Russian tradition but also with a mix of the former American and Caribbean musical influence.

The previous regime of Fulgencio Batista, the military sported to military bands: the Music Band of the Cuban Navy (officially named as the Music Band of the Constitutional Navy) both of which were established 5 years apart in the first decade of the 20th century. The Band of the Ceremonial Unit of the Revolutionary Armed Forces has acclaimed high praise by many foreign leaders, including U.S. President Barack Obama, who greeted bandleader Ney Miguel Milanes Gálvez and said that they did a "Good job" for their performance of The Star-Spangled Banner.

=== Dominican Republic ===
Given the long history of the Armed Forces of the Dominican Republic, it is no surprise that the military band tradition is a mix of the French and United States military band practice. Ceremonial bands are present not just in the Armed Forces but in the Dominican Republic National Police.

The Armed Forces' senior band is the Band of the Presidential Guard Regiment, the seniormost of the infantry of the Dominican Army, which serves as the protocol band for the President of the Dominican Republic, who serves as the Commander-in-Chief of the Armed Forces.

=== Ecuador ===
As a general rule Ecuadorian military bands are manned by servicemen with formations modeled after the German, British and United States practice. In parades, the percussion forms the front rank of the band or massed bands during the march past segment of parades.

The Mounted Band of the Ecuadorian National Police uses brass, woodwinds and percussion (sans the timpani). The Ecuadorian Army's Eloy Alfaro Military Academy uses the same format as French bands but without the bugles, as they are part of the Corps of Drums. The fanfare band of the Presidential Mounted Ceremonial Squadron "Tarqui Grenadiers", also of the Army, is composed only of timpani, fanfare trumpets, a snare drum, single tenor drums and sousaphones (when mounted), the military band, which serves as the official presidential band, has a similar formation like the Military Academy but with the large size (around 60 musicians).

=== Guatemala ===
European influence of military bands in Guatemala began when an Italian opera company arrived in the country in the latter half of the 19th century to bring orchestra conductor Pietro Visoni to the country, where he was asked by President Miguel García Granados to take control of the bands of the 1st and 2nd battalions of the Guatemalan Army, after which Visoni merged the two and established the Martial Symphony Band, which is still in existence today. The School of Substitutes (known today as Military School of Music Maestro Rafael Alvarez Ovalle) was created shortly after due to the lack of trained military musicians in the country. The school of music is today a middle level military training center. Many bands, when in concert formation, include the marimba as it is the national instrument of Guatemala.

=== Jamaica ===
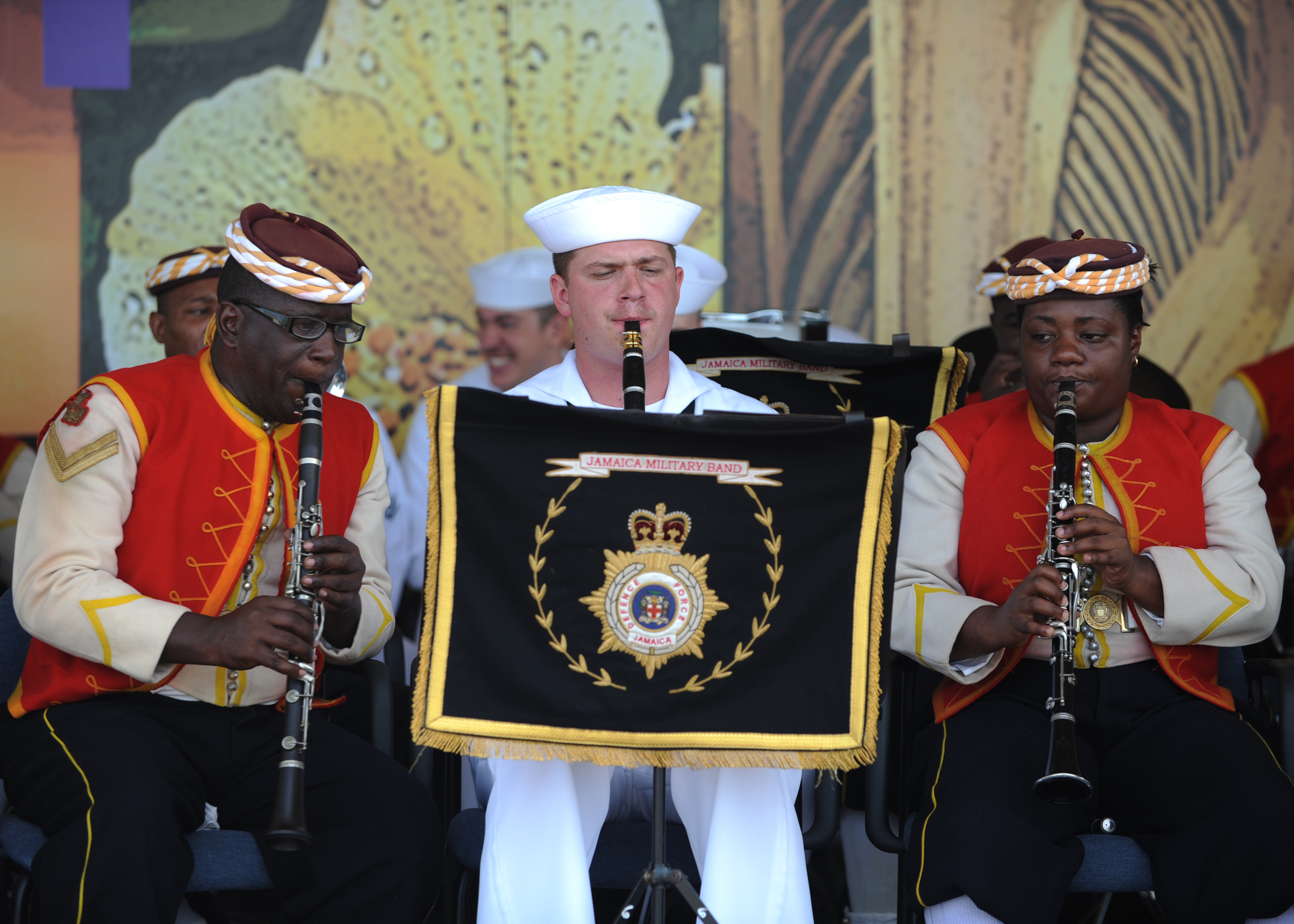
Jamaica Military Band performed with members of the United States naval band.

The Jamaica Defence Force funds and oversees two full-time military bands - the Jamaica Military Band (JMB) and the Jamaica Regiment Band (JRB). During war time, musicians will take on operational roles as Medical Assistants. Jamaican military bands follow the precedent set by British and other Caribbean military bands. The Jamaican Combined Cadet Force also maintains its own unit band.

=== Mexico ===
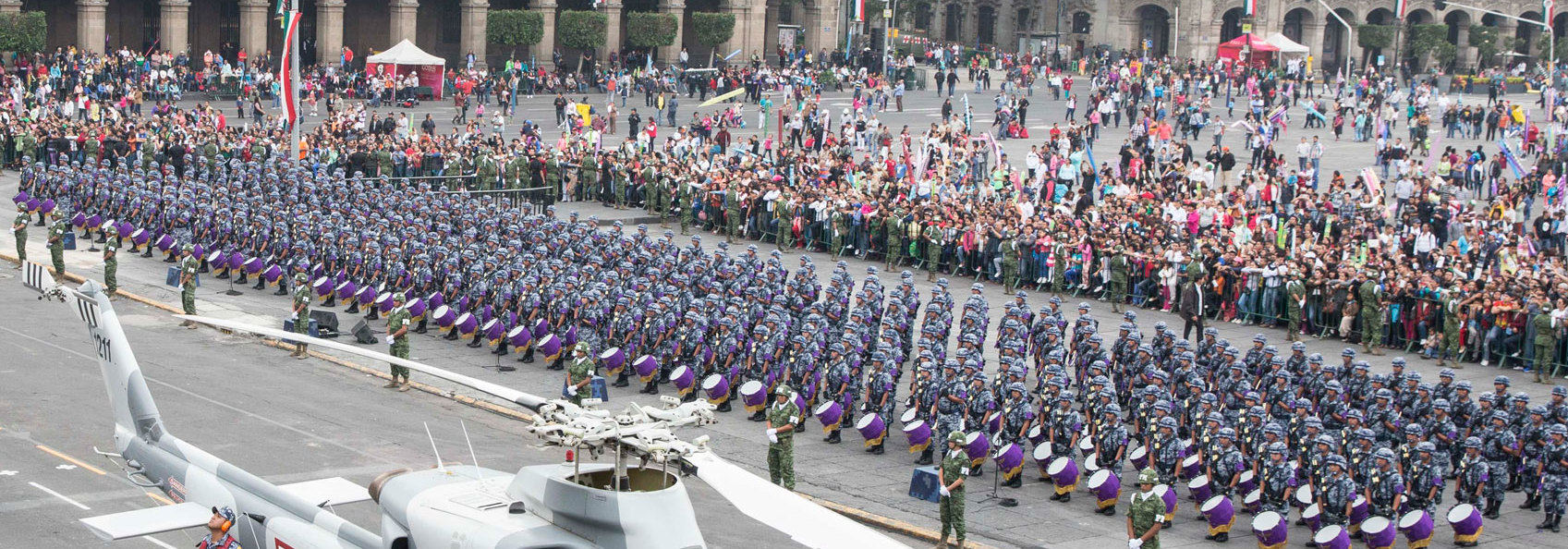
Military band in Mexico

Military bands in Mexico follow the precedent of the Spanish military, with the band being on ceremonial occasions backed up by a drum and bugle corps mainly composed of snare drummers and buglers, both of which are provided by military units and educational institutions. In cavalry and artillery units of the Army and the cavalry of the National Guard, fanfare trumpeters are the equivalent to their infantry counterparts. In 1884, the 76-member Band of the 8th Mexican Cavalry Regiment under the direction of Encarnación Payén visited the World's Industrial and Cotton Centennial Exposition, which was seen as a massive PR campaign for American investment by Mexican President Porfirio Diaz. It was also designed to showcase Mexican military music, which was rarely if ever done before. Five years later, Diaz ordered the creation of the Music Band of the Supreme Power, which is now the Representative Music Band of the Mexican Armed Forces. In February 2015, it was reorganized to include personnel from the Secretariats of the Mexican Army, the Mexican Air Force and the Mexican Navy. The Symphonic Band and Chorus of the Secretariat of the Navy also serves as a military band, consisting of professional musicians in the Secretariat of the Navy.

The 1884 U.S. trip also influenced civilian music in the southern U.S., which many members of the band staying in New Orleans and forming and/or joining civilian bands. Lorenzo Tio Sr., the father of Lorenzo Tio Jr., was a notable example of this.

Bands and drummers and buglers wear the full dress or combat dress uniform of their service branch/unit or assigned educational institution, with appropriate distinctive unit insignia and patches.

=== Paraguay ===
Military bands are in service within the Armed Forces of Paraguay and the National Police of Paraguay, following the former Imperial German and French band patterns. The seniormost band is the Band of the Presidential Guard Regiment, which serves the President of Paraguay as Supreme Commander in Chief of the Armed Forces, it falls under the operational control of the Paraguayan Army.

=== Peru ===
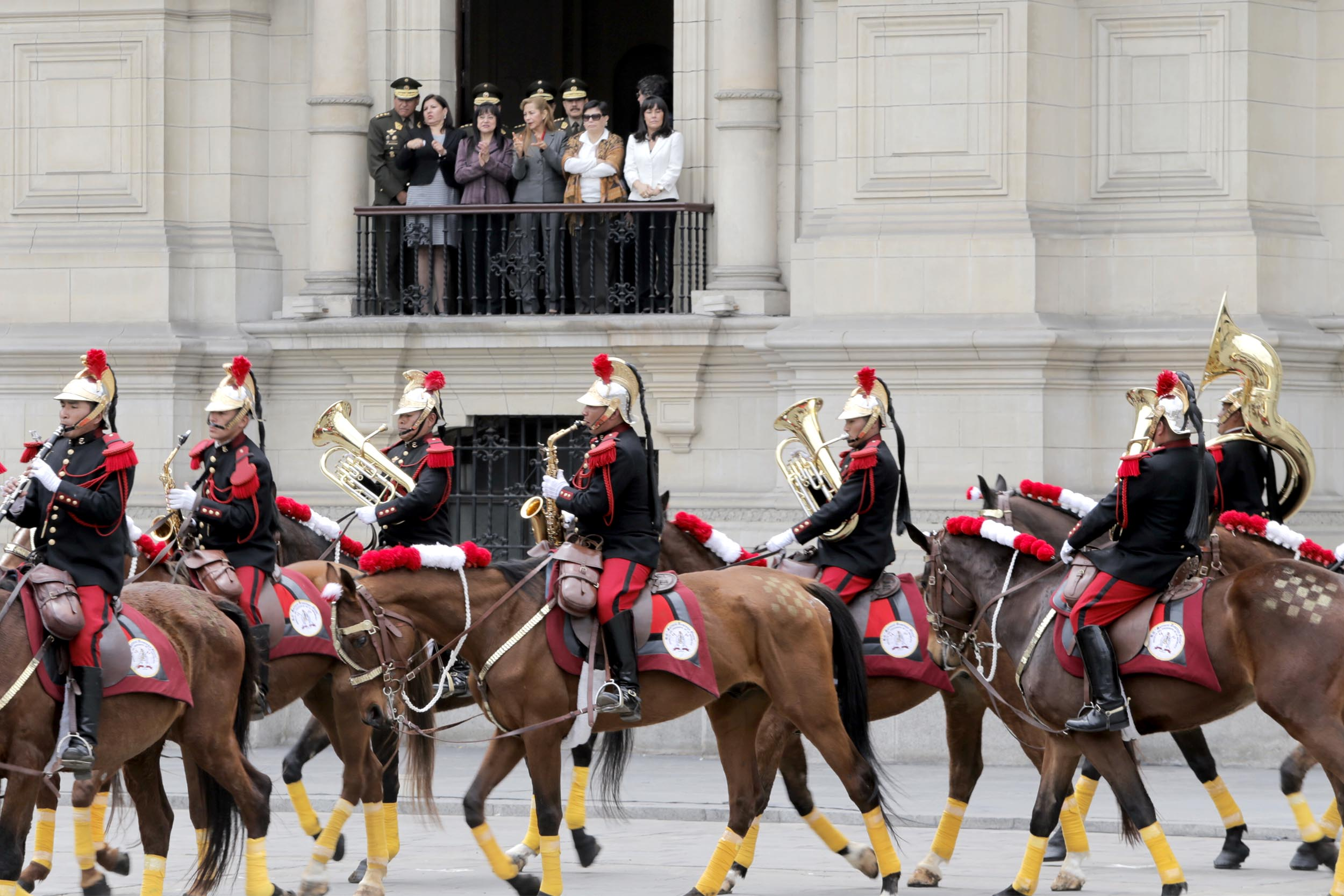
The regimental band of the Presidential Life Guard Dragoons Regiment is the only active mounted band in the Peruvian Armed Forces.

Examples of Peruvian bands include the Mounted Fanfare Band Company of the "Mariscal Domingo Nieto" Cavalry Regiment Escort, the Band of the Chorrillos Military School of the Peruvian Army, the Lima Air Region Band of the Peruvian Air Force, the Peruvian Air Force Central Band, and the Casma Cadet Band of the Peruvian Naval School. These bands follow the Spanish and French practice, although with drums out front following the French model, followed by the occasional bugle section (more often during the 1980s to early 1990s). The Presidential Life Guard Dragoons Regiment's regimental band is also the only mounted band in active service within the Peruvian Armed Forces.

The Peruvian Republican Guard Band, for seven decades, provided music during state ceremonies, state funerals, and other events. The unit was disbanded in 1991 when the band was merged with that of the National Police's other predecessor services' bands. The Mounted Band of the Presidential Life Guard Dragoons Regiment, the other official presidential band, was established in 1905 along with the formation of the regiment, was disbanded in 1987 and remained inactive until 2012, when it was reactivated by Ollanta Humala, the President of Peru.

In addition to the military bands of the Peruvian Armed Forces, the military-styled band of the National Police of Peru continues the heritage of the Republican Guard Band together with the bands of the Civil Guard and the Investigations Police. Assigned to Lima it has carried on the designation of official protocol band.

=== Trinidad and Tobago ===
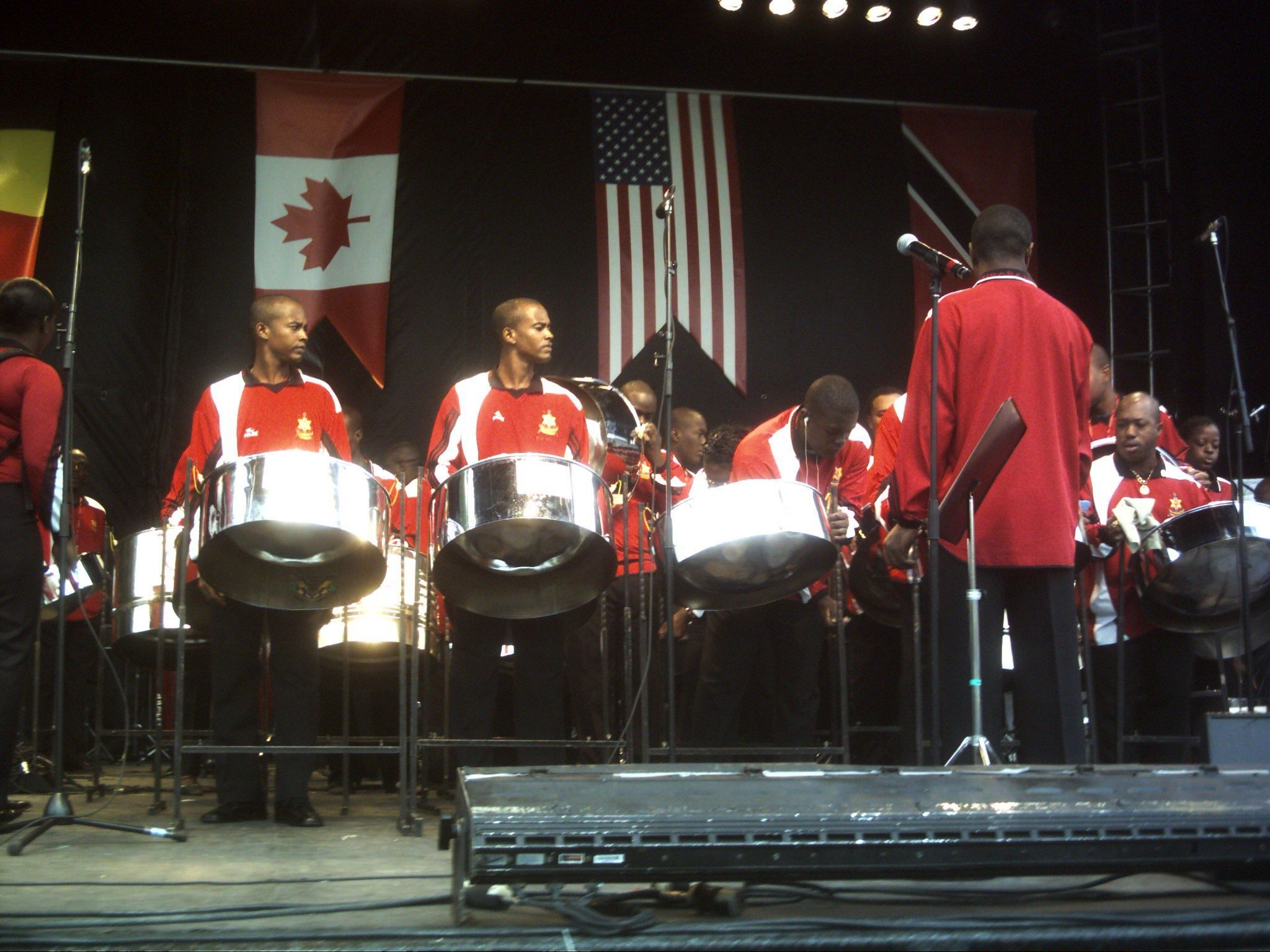
Steelpans are a type of instrument used by the Trinidad and Tobago Defence Force Steel Orchestra.

Trinidadian military bands are unique in that they follow French and British traditions for military bands, however, they use unconventional instruments such as Steelpans and native Trinidadian instruments. To this day, the Trinidad and Tobago Defence Force Steel Orchestra (TTDFSO) is the only military steel band of its kind in the world. The TTDF's Trinidad and Tobago Regiment provides the majority of the musicians who are assigned to the orchestra.

=== United States ===
The American military band traditions date from the British era. From the American Revolutionary War onward military bands – and field musicians playing drums, fifes and bugles – marched in the same manner as their French counterparts. Ever since the American Revolution ended in 1781, American military bands march to the fast tempo of French military bands, owing to their fast marching pace as compared with the slow marching pace of British bands. The instrumental positioning, even though inspired by the British, is also a mix of other influences, including French and German influences.

During the American Civil War most Union regiments had both types of groups within the unit. However, due to changes in military tactics by the end of World War I field musical had been mostly phased out in favor of the brass bands - themselves the basis for today's American civil brass band culture and traditions. These performed in a concert setting for entertainment, as well as continued to perform drill and martial events. In the United States, these bands were increased in instrumentation to include woodwinds, leading to the modern military band traditions in the United States, and high school and college marching bands and concert bands.

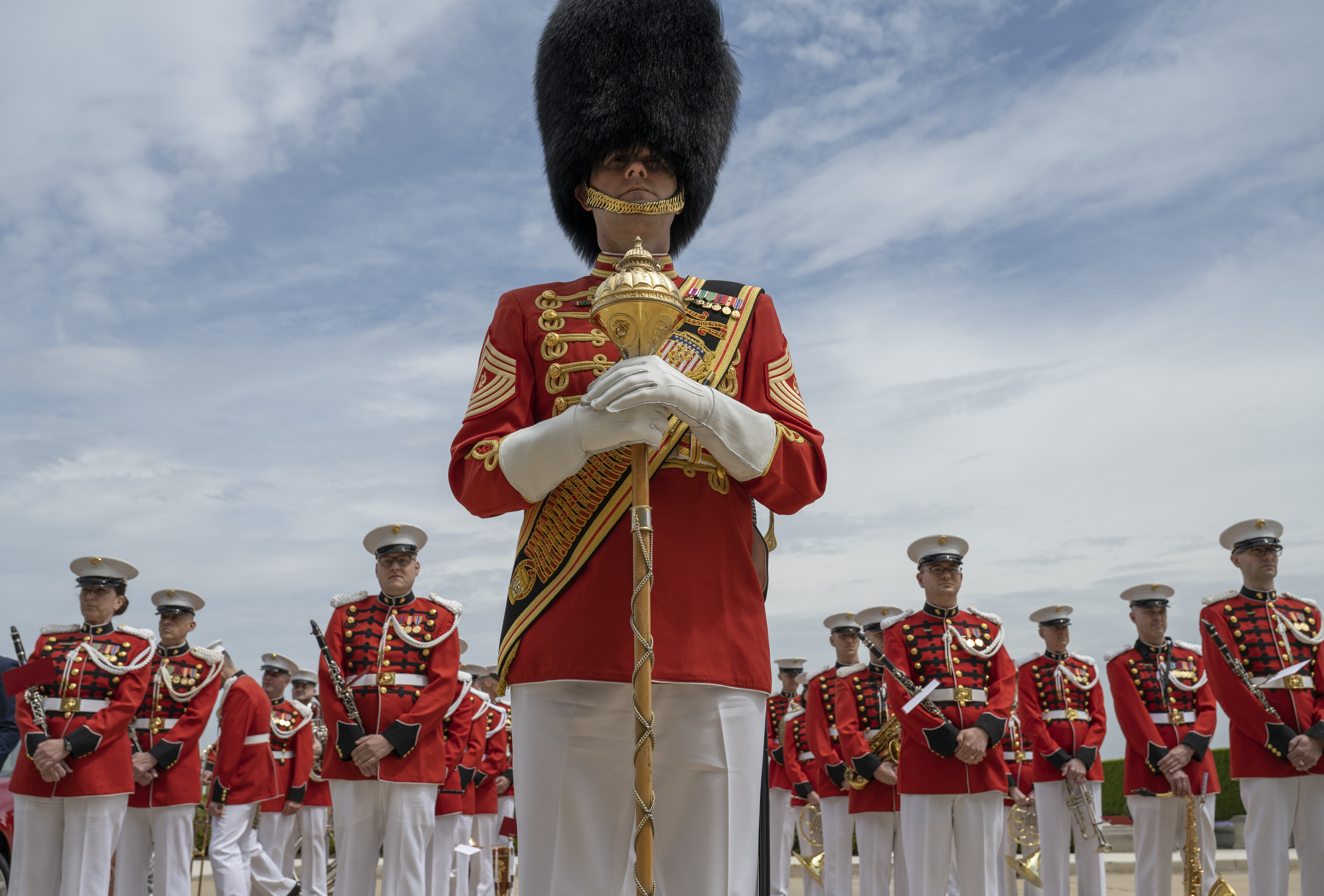
Members of "The President's Own" United States Marine Band's stand at ease before the Secretary of Defense Lloyd J. Austin III welcomes Ukrainian Prime Minister Denys Shmyhal to the Pentagon, Arlington, VA, April 21, 2022. (DoD photo by U.S. Air Force Tech. Sgt. Brittany A. Chase)

A uniquely American type of military band is the Fife and drum corps, with the Old Guard Fife and Drum Corps the only remaining band of this type in the United States military. The United States' military bugle bands are also the precursors of the modern-day civil drum and bugle corps and the only one in active service today is that of the United States Marine Drum and Bugle Corps "The Commandant's Own".

The largest military marching band in the U.S. is the "Fightin' Texas Aggie Band" of Texas A&M University. It is entirely composed of ROTC cadets from the university's Corps of Cadets and subdivided into two bands: the Infantry and Artillery bands of the Corps. The four other State Military Colleges and four Junior Military Colleges maintain bands of their own. The format used by the British Royal Marines is the formation used by the Valley Forge Military Academy and College Regimental Band in Wayne, Pennsylvania, led and staffed by retired RMBS personnel, and by the United States Merchant Marine Academy Regimental Band, also modeled on the Royal Marines bands. Another American military academy, the Missouri Military Academy, has its band modeled in the same manner as the Royal Marines.

=== Uruguay ===
The Mounted Band of the 1st Cavalry Regiment "José Gervasio Artigas's Blandengues" of the Uruguayan Army is a mounted band following the Argentine practice, wearing the regiment's 19th-century full dress uniforms, but unlike its Argentine counterpart, also uses woodwinds. Another example is that of the Army's 1st Infantry Brigade Band, the official honors band of the General Assembly of Uruguay, which sports dress uniforms worn during the Argentina-Brazil War and later conflicts. Bands are also mounted by the Army's Uruguayan Military School and the General Artigas Military High School, the latter having recently reinstated the use of the bugle for its field section, the only band to do so. The Air Force Band, which reports to the Air Force Academy, is the only one that uses the shoulder-mounted snares and the multiple tenor drum. Uruguayan military bands have field drummers and occasionally buglers and fifes accompanying the main band. The National Navy of Uruguay maintains for ceremonial purposes the Band of the Uruguayan Naval Academy, which doubles as the official band of the service. It has a bagpipe section attached to it.

The "Day of the Military Musicians" is marked in the Armed Forces celebrated on 30 November, with the International Festival of Military Bands held every year on this date.

== Military bands in Asia ==
=== Armenia ===
The Military Band Division of the General Staff of Armed Forces of Armenia oversees all of the military bands in Armenia. The Band of the General Staff of the Armed Forces of Armenia is the seniormost military band in the entire military, performing at all state functions and national military parades. It follows the Russian and Europe a precedent for military bands, being formed from the former Band of The Soviet Army Yerevan Garrison. The combined band performs as a guest contingent in the military parade of the Artsakh Defense Army in Stepanakert. The Police Band of Armenia formerly served as the band of the country's Internal Troops. Like the Armenian Army and the Police of Armenia, the Rescue Service of the Ministry of Emergency Situations maintains a 48-member military brass band known as the Poghatin Nvagaxumb, founded recently in 2010 by order of by Minister Armen Yeritsyan. The Armenian Border Guard also maintains its own brass band.

=== Brunei ===
The Band of the Royal Brunei Armed Forces (Pancaragam Angkatan Bersenjata Diraja Brunei) is the official band of the Royal Brunei Armed Forces. Raised in 1962, it was at first led by musicians seconded from British Army formations and graduates of the prestigious Royal Military School of Music. Badged at first as the regimental band of the then newly raised Royal Brunei Malay Regiment, it became the Armed Forces Band in 1984, when the country attained independence. The band's first Brunei-born Director of Music, Major Haji Manaf bin Kamis, was appointed to that role that year and was on the helm during the country's first Independence Day parade on 23 February that year. Its international participation thru the years has been in military tattoos such as the Edinburgh Military Tattoo, the Brunei Darussalam International Tattoo and the Berlin Military Music Festival. The RBAF Band first participated in the Hari Merdeka celebrations and the Kuala Lumpur International Tattoo in Malaysia in 2007 and has since become one of the more popular guest bands in Malaysian celebrations. Since then the RBAF Band has served as the official state and protocol band of the nation, playing during state visits, the ceremonial opening of the sessions of the Legislative Council, passing out parades, state funerals and key national holidays. As of 2003 Major Awg Jaya bin Metussin is the director of music of the RBAF Band. Since its raising the band followed the format of British Army bands of line infantry regiments with the drumline at the front of the band, since it was formed with assistance from their musicians and experienced band leaders from the British Army as well as from the bands of both the Royal Brunei Police Force (established 1958) and the Royal Malaysian Police in the neighbouring Malaysian state of Sarawak.

=== China ===
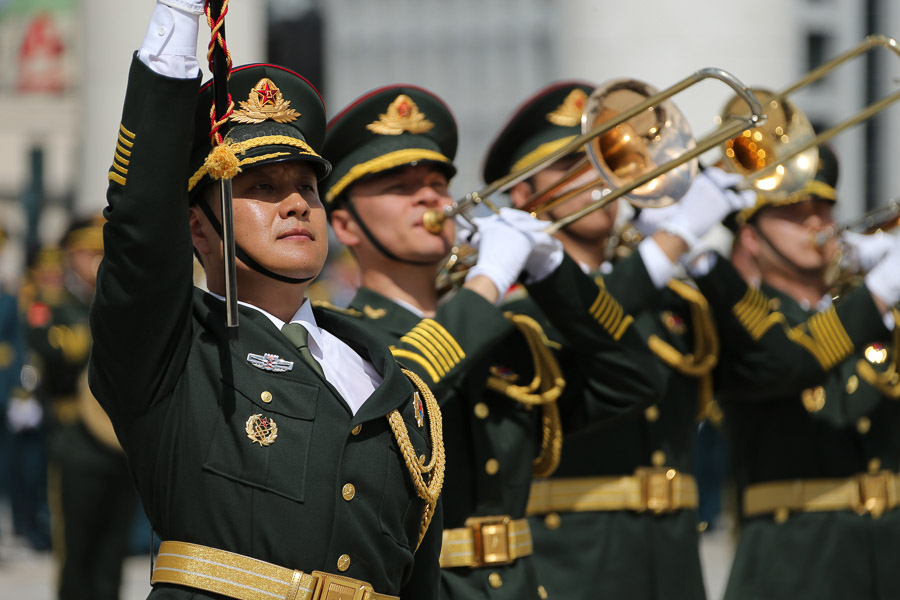
The Central Military Band of the People's Liberation Army is the senior military band in the People's Republic of China.

Military music bands within China are descended from the brass and percussion formations raised during the Imperial era and the first Western-styled military bands formed during the final decades of the Qing Dynasty, as the nation began to modernize its armed forces. During the Boxer Rebellion, the xenophobic Chinese General Dong Fuxiang who commanded the Muslim Kansu Braves, refused to allow his troops to play western musical instruments, making them play traditional Chinese instruments such as the Sheng Jia.

Although inspired by Soviet military music throughout their history, the bands of the People's Republic of China, from both the People's Liberation Army (PLA) or the People's Armed Police play indigenous and locally composed military marches, during official ceremonies and other events as called for. The military bands of the People's Republic of China play a mix of foreign and native marches and musical pieces. Their formation today mirrors those of bands in Russia, up until 2009 the formation was a throwback to those used there in the parades of the 1930s and 1940s.

The Central Military Band of the People's Liberation Army is the senior military band in the country, with the band falling under the command and supervision of the Political Work Department, which is a directorate of the Central Military Commission.

The PLA National Marching Band is a distinct unit attached to the PLA Central Band, which consists of 61 field drummers, state fanfare trumpeters, and buglers who are similar in marching style to the United States Marine Drum and Bugle Corps, and somewhat resembles United States college marching bands. Other unit bands exist in the PLA known as "amateur bands", with those including the Women's Military Band of the PLA National Defense University, the 14th Group Army Band, the PLA Airborne Corps Band and the 6th Armored Division Band.

==== Hong Kong ====
The band of the People's Liberation Army Hong Kong Garrison is modelled similarly to the other garrison bands of the PLA. Along with the PLA Hong Kong Garrison, the police band for the Hong Kong Police provides similar functions to a military band. These bands will often play a mix of Chinese, and international marches.

In addition to the band of the PLA Hong Kong Garrison, military-styled bands in Hong Kong are typically modelled after British and Commonwealth military bands. As a result, a number of military-styled bands in Hong Kong will also make use of pipe bands, a common feature with military bands in the Commonwealth. The band of the Hong Kong Sea Cadet Corps is modelled after the Royal Navy pattern. Formerly, the Band of the Royal Hong Kong Regiment was used as the official protocol band.

==== Macau ====
The Public Security Police Force of Macau maintains a military-style band that reflects the region's Portuguese military traditions. This band is known as the Banda de Música da Polícia de Segurança Pública de Macau, or the Band of the PSP for short. The Band of the PLA Macao Garrison is also available in the region.

=== India ===
Indian military bands are based on the British pattern and have evolved to be unique in its own right. Martial bands have existed in Indian culture since the era of the Maratha Empire. It was only in the 18th century that organized military bands were brought to India by the British Army. Military bands are maintained throughout the regimental centres of the Indian Army, Indian Navy commands and bases and the air stations of the Indian Air Force. As a general rule bands are fronted by tuba and euphonium players in the front rank, a tradition inherited from the Royal Artillery Band, a few bands have trombonists in the front ranks.

India boasts the largest number of military bands, with the Indian Armed Forces today having more than 60 military bands and over 400 pipe bands. The Military Music Wing of the Army Education Corps is the principal musical education institution of the Indian Army. The Indian military also has dedicated pipe bands that serve as independent units and are maintained by all infantry regiments. A regular military band consists of a band master and 33 musicians while a regular Army pipe band consists of a drum major, a pipe major and a minimum size of 17 drummers and pipers for battalion formations, mostly from the infantry battalions.

=== Indonesia ===
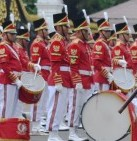
The Presidential Security Force music detachment is responsible to play the national anthem during a state visit

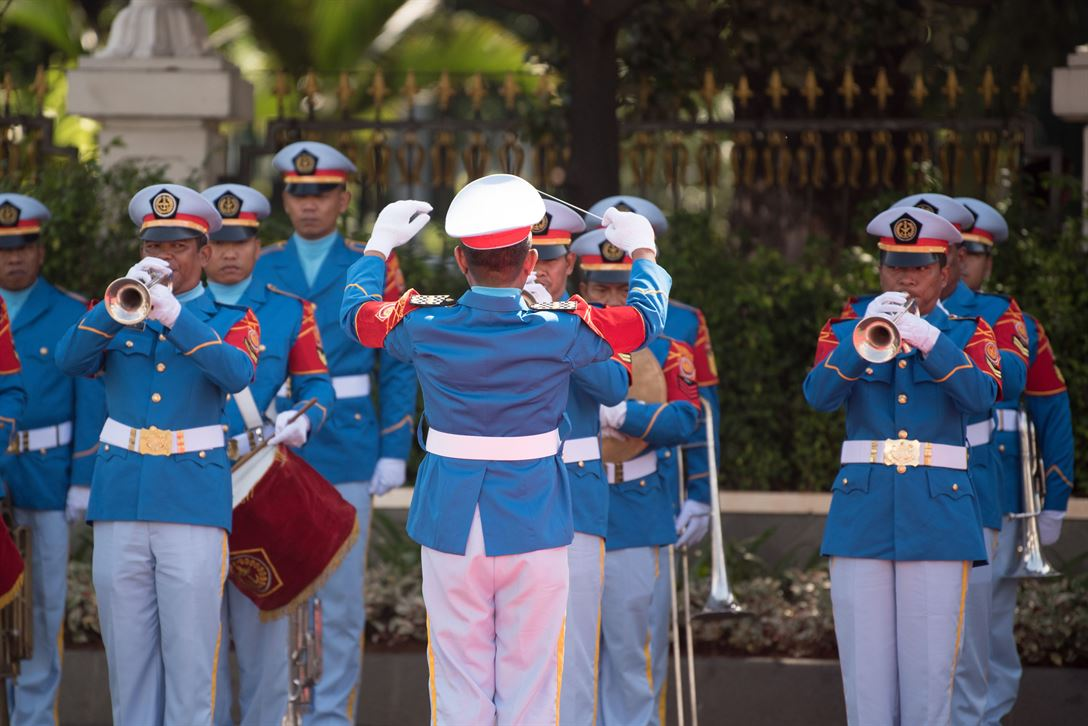
The military band of the Indonesian National Armed Forces during a ceremony

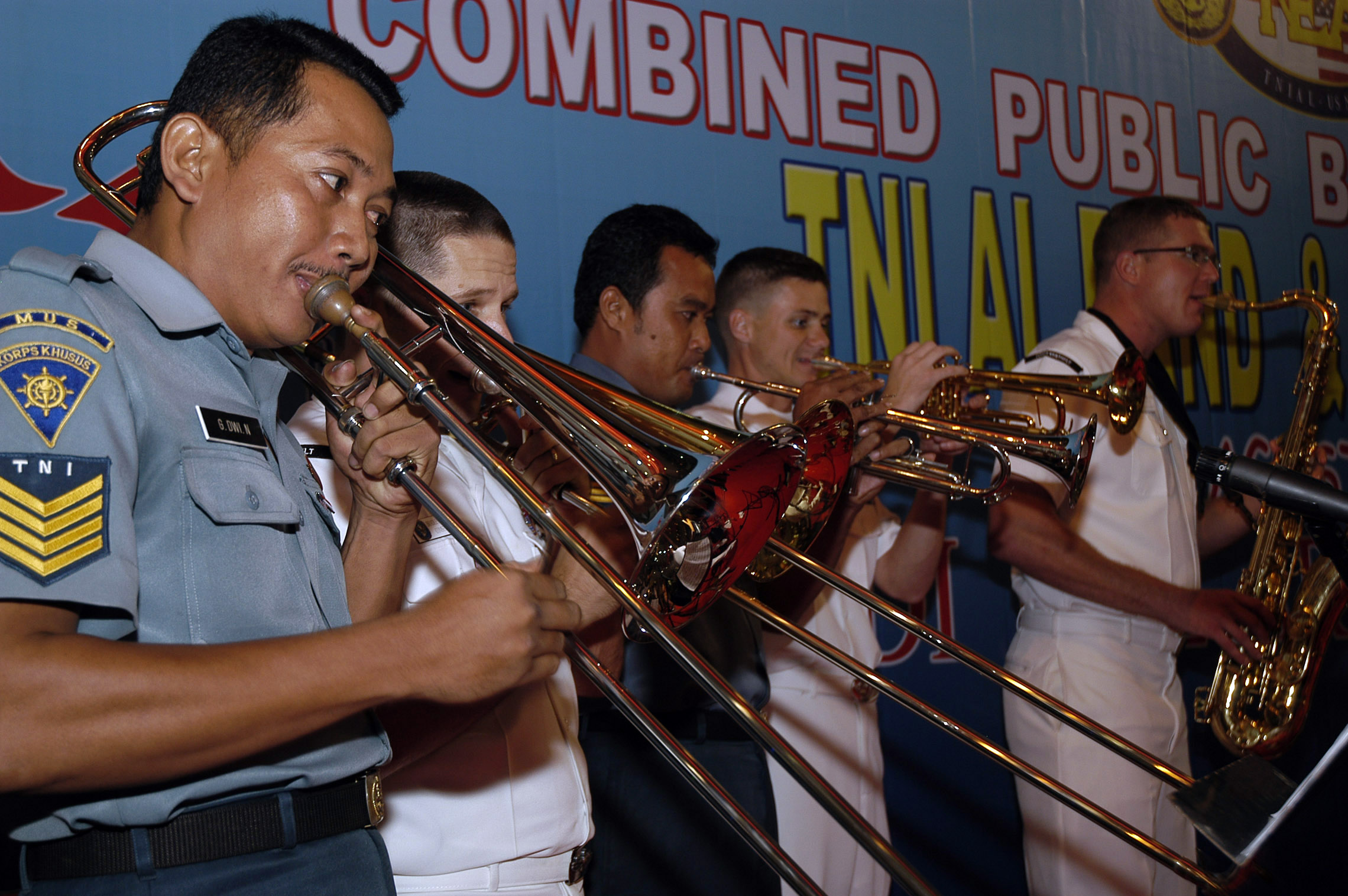
Indonesian Navy musicians play alongside US Navy musicians

The modern Indonesian military band tradition includes Japanese, Dutch, British and United States influences, with prior forms from Portuguese and Chinese origin. Known locally as Ceremonial Bands (Korps Musik Upacara/Satuan Musik Upacara/Detasemen Musik Upacara), they form part of the Indonesian National Armed Forces. The most senior of these bands is the Paspampres Presidential Band, which is part of the Presidential Security Forces of the Republic of Indonesia. These bands are led by Conductors and Bandmasters and are of the headquarters element. Indonesia also maintains a "corps of drums" tradition, such ensembles being led by drum majors. These exist either as full bands or guard post bands (termed as genderang sangkakala) which provide the arrival or departure honors for distinguished military and police officers and government officials. Such ceremonial units, both bands and field music, are also part of the Dutch colonial legacy, as both the Royal Netherlands East Indies Army and the Royal Netherlands Navy included similar formations before independence, both on the basis of the existing Tanjidor civil band culture of Jakarta, developed as a result of the Dutch band traditions which arrived in the 18th and 19th centuries.

Similar ceremonial bands are maintained by the Indonesian National Police.

The following is a list of active military bands in Indonesia:

- Paspampres Presidential Band
- Headquarters Ceremonial Band of the Indonesian National Armed Forces (Korps Musik Upacara Mabes TNI)
- Headquarters Staff Band of the Indonesian Army
- Corps of Drums Kartika Bahana Nusantara of the Indonesian Army Headquarters
- Headquarters Staff Band of the Indonesian Navy
- Headquarters Staff Band of the Indonesian Air Force
- Ceremonial Band of the Indonesian National Police
- Corps of Drums Canka Lokananta and Regimental Band of the Indonesian Military Academy
- Regimental Band of the Indonesian Naval Academy
- Naval Academy Gita Jala Taruna Drum and Bugle Corps
- Regimental Band of the Indonesian Air Force Academy
- Air Force Academy Gita Dirgantara Drum and Bugle Corps
- Indonesian Police Academy Pelopor Cendrawasih Drum and Bugle Corps
- Headquarters Band, Jakarta Capital Regional Military Command
- Drum and Bugle Corps (Training) of the Jakarta Regional Training Regiment
- Band of the Army Officer Candidate School
- Corps of Drums Canka Panorama of the Army Officer Candidate School
- Headquarters Band of the Army Education, Training and Doctrine Command
- Band of the Army Adjutant General's Corps Training School
- Drum and Bugle Corps (Training) of the Army Adjutant General's Corps Training School
- Headquarters Band, Iskandar Muda Regional Military Command
- Headquarters Band, 2nd Regional Regional Military Command
- Headquarters Band, 3rd Siliwangi Regional Military Command
- Headquarters Band, 9th Udayana Regional Military Command
- Drum and Bugle Corps of the 14th Regional Military Command
- Corps of Drums of the 1st Regional Military Command
- Indonesian Marine Corps Band Jakarta
- Indonesian Marine Drum and Bugle Corps
- Indonesian Marine Corps Band Surabaya
- Band of the 1st Air Force Operational Command West

=== Iran ===
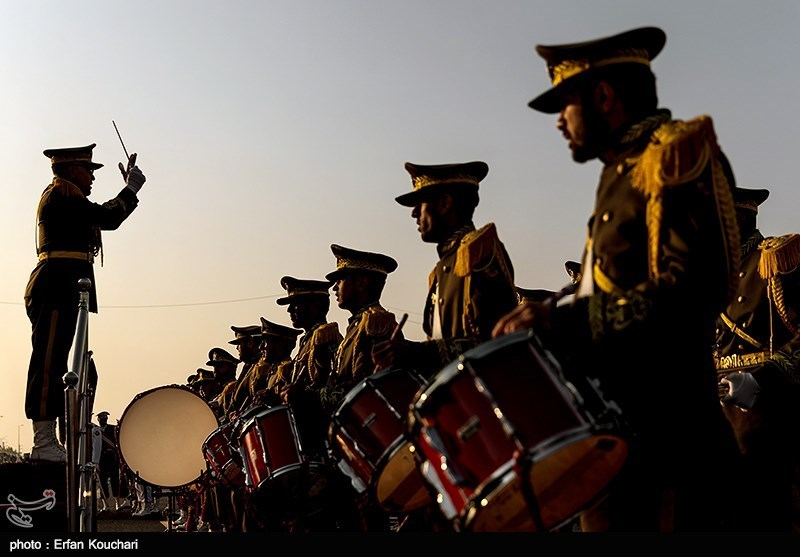
An Iranian military band during the Army Day celebrations in 2018.

All Iranian military bands follow the British, French and Arab format for these units, with the percussion at the front ranks following the practice of the British line infantry and the Royal Marines (with occasional bugles following Russian precedents). The first military band concept in Iran came in the mid to late-1800s after the European tours of King Naser al-Din Shah Qajar of Persia. After his first tour in the 1860s, he ordered the creation of a military music school and an Imperial Army band. He specifically employed French musicians in the westernization of the military bands in the country.

The Iranian Armed Forces maintains military bands in the Islamic Revolutionary Guard Corps and the Islamic Republic of Iran Army. The latter maintains military bands across its branches, including the Ground Forces, Air Force, and Navy.

Prior to 1979, the Bands of the Imperial Immortal Guard provided musical accompaniment for official events of state. All of these bands provide honours for the Iranian President and during events such as state visits and national holidays in a tri-service format in the capital of Tehran. Bands are also provided by territorial military units within the country's provinces and major cities.

=== Iraq ===
Iraqi army music bands were formed on 30 August 1922. The Military Music School is the primary educational institution for military bands. Many Iraqi military bands have become in high demand since the Iraq War and the war on terror.

=== Israel ===
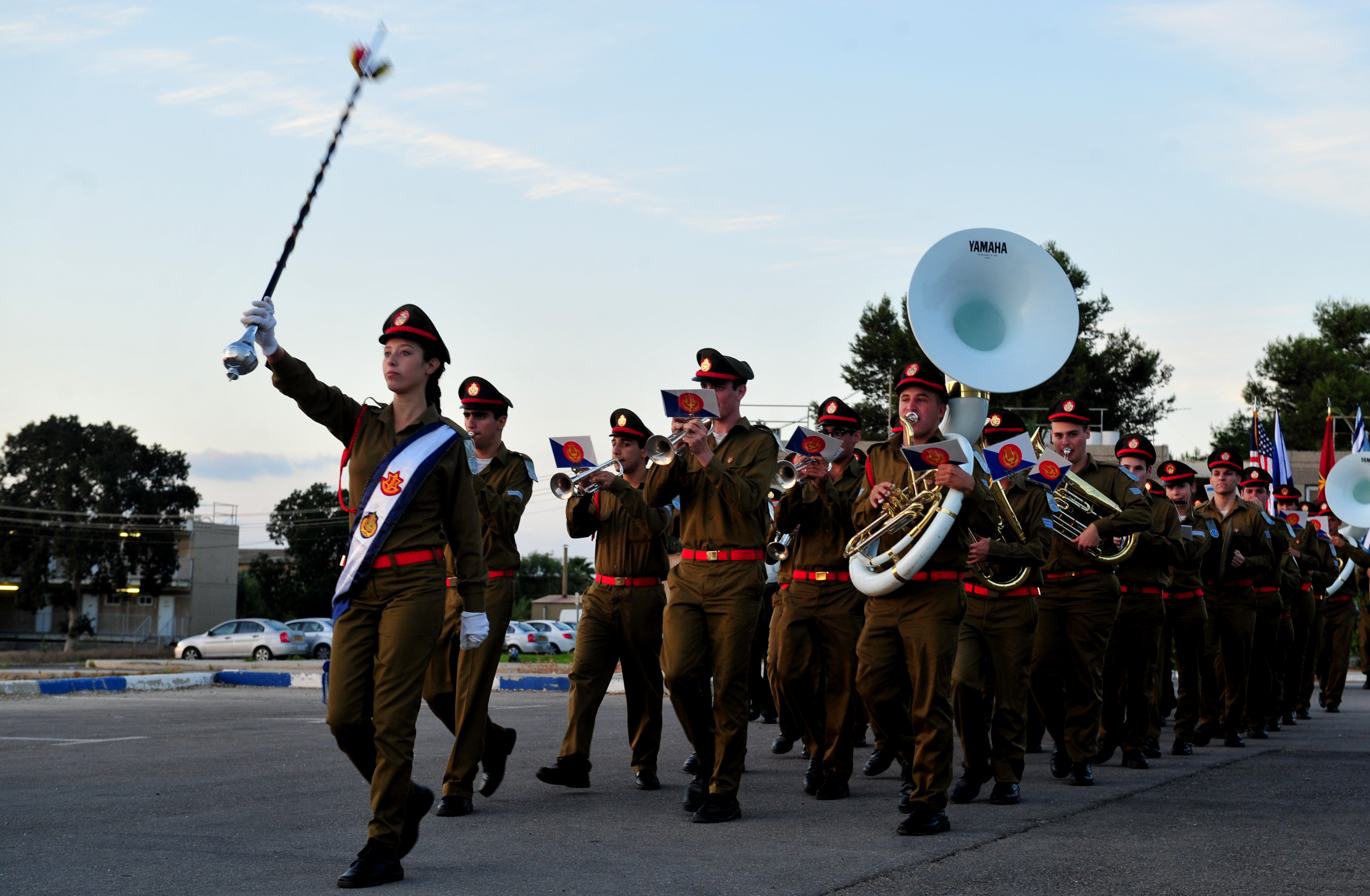
The Israel Defense Forces Orchestra is the main musical ensemble of the Israel Defense Forces.

Even before the 1948 establishment of the State of Israel, military bands have been active and prominent in the region for many decades. As it refers to bands inside the current borders of Israel, the only known ones were small groups of soldiers organized in the country's first 20 years in existence. These bands were formed up of soldiers who served in battalions who were deployed in remote parts of the country. Israeli military bands reached what is considered to be their golden age during the late '60s and mid-'70s. At the time, many famous and well-off actors and musicians based in Israel received their musical education not from a music school, but rather from military bands within the Army, which as a general rule were inspired at first by the musical traditions of the British Armed Forces.

Today, the Israel Defense Forces Orchestra, which has similarities to American and British military bands plus a mix of the Russian tradition with its trumpeters stationed at front of the band, is the flagship ensemble of the IDF and responsible for live musical accompaniment at all national events taking place in Tel Aviv and Jerusalem. Additionally, bands are also found in the Education and Youth Corps of the IDF's Manpower Directorate. The Outstanding Musicians Program of the IDF is the most common of the varied ways that young soldiers continue to develop and advance their musical skills during their military service within the Forces.

=== Japan ===
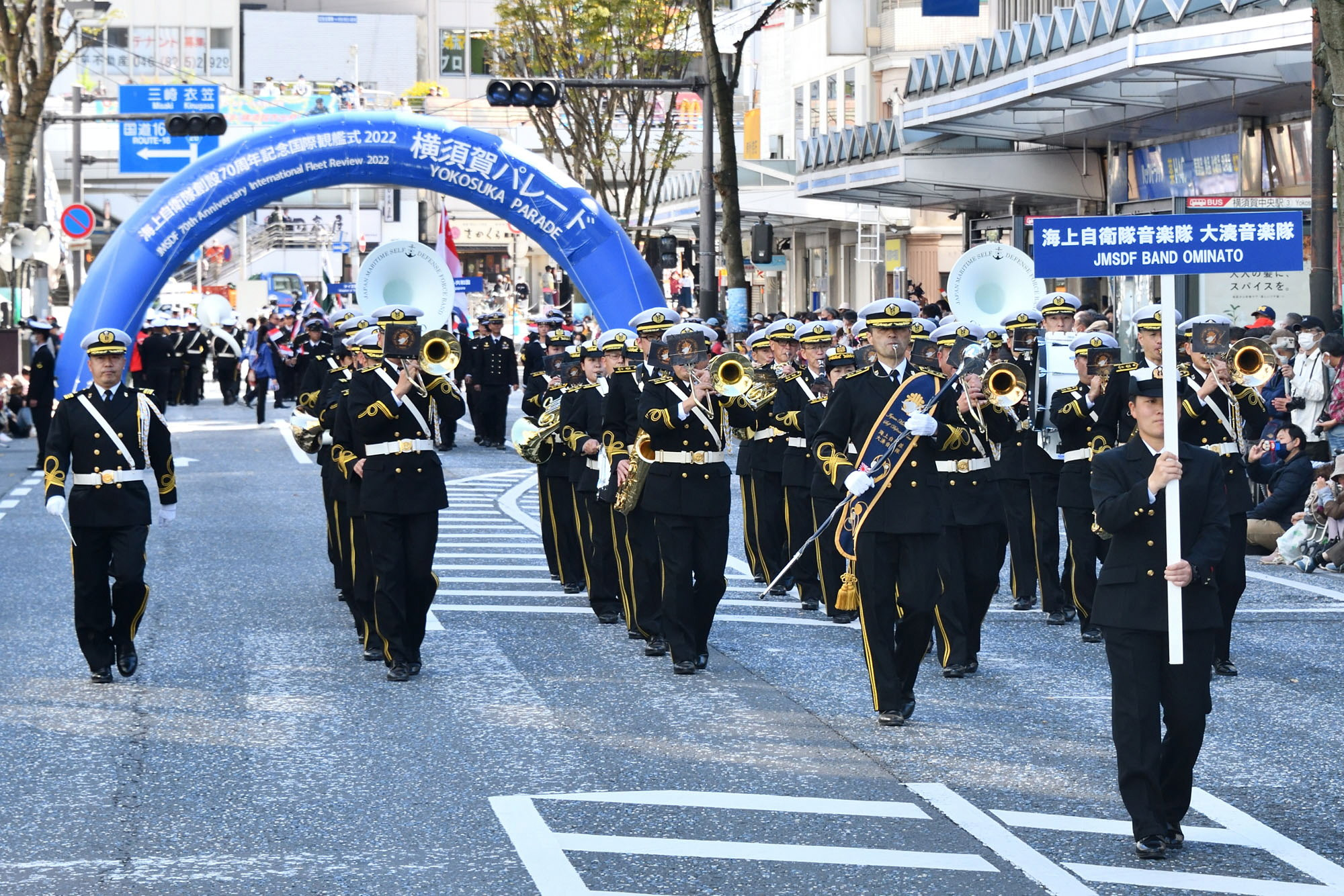
Maritime Self-Defense Force Ominato Band marching at the Yokosuka Parade held during the International Fleet Review 2022

The Western military band tradition arrived in Japan during the Meiji Restoration, which saw the armed forces reformed to the standards of Western armed services. Today, the Japan Self-Defense Force sports a moderate number of military bands within all its service branches (The Ground, Maritime and Air Self-Defense Forces) which carry on a long heritage of Japanese military music beginning in the 1880s. The JSDF also carries on the Imperial practice of bugle call playing, and every service branch has dedicated bugle platoons present in almost every unit using G major bugles similar to those used by the United States Army in the past.

Japanese military bands have a number of formations, modeled on those in the United States and the United Kingdom, and they are led by Drum Majors, Conductors and Bandmasters, while the bugle platoons are led on parades by a Bugle Major. Aside from ceremonial duties, military musicians have no secondary duties, while buglers serve combat roles.

The main military bands of the JSDF include the Japan Ground Self-Defense Force Central Band, the Japan Maritime Self-Defense Force Band, and the Japan Air Self-Defense Force Central Band. In addition to the three service branches' centralized bands, the JSDF also maintains several regimental, brigade and divisional bands, including the Eastern Army Band, the Central Army Band, 1st Division Band, and the Tokyo SDF Band.

Until 1945, the Japanese Imperial Guard maintained mounted cavalry and dismounted bands that performed musical duties, alongside the rest of the bands of both the Imperial Japanese Army and the Imperial Japanese Navy.

=== Jordan ===
The Hashemite Kingdom of Jordan, like many other Arab nations and Commonwealth countries, follow the British precedent and pattern for military bands. The Jordanian Armed Forces sports many different military bands that span its three branches of service. Like other Middle Eastern military bands, Jordan follows the tradition of including pipe bands in its units. The military arranges the Jordanian Army Band Corps, which is the organizational body for military music, in a similar fashion to the Bands of the Household Division. In 1952, a small school of music was built in order to begin training military musicians. The most senior band in the armed forces is the Jordanian Armed Forces Band, which particularly serves the House of Hashim in its position as the ruling royal family of Jordan.

Jordanian military band institutions and units include the School of Music of the Jordanian Armed Forces, Prince of Jordan Pipe Band, and the Al Hussein Musical Band.

=== Kazakhstan ===
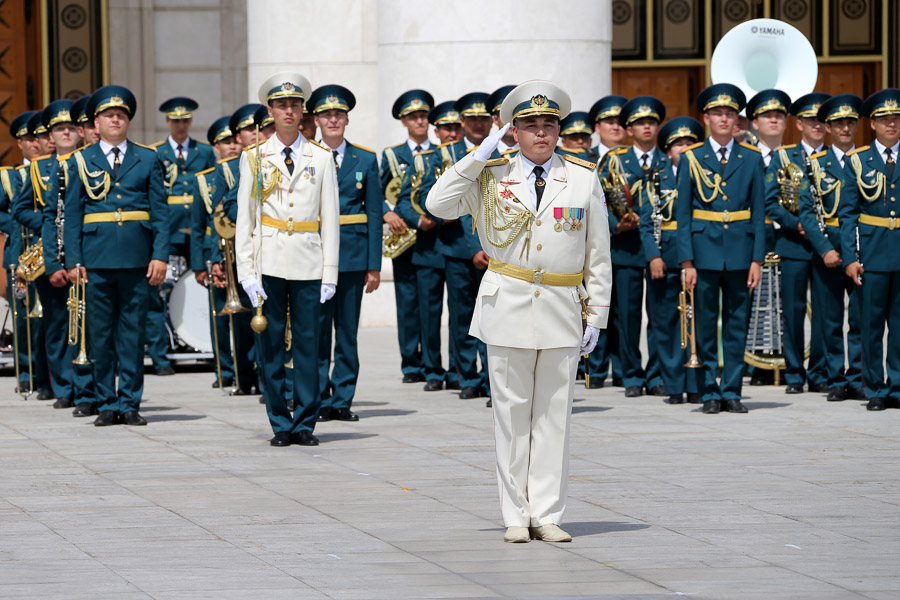
The Central Military Band of the Ministry of Defense of Kazakhstan at the 2016 SCO Military Tattoo

While retaining a lot of Soviet/Russian military music that was composed in the Soviet era, military bands in the Armed Forces of Kazakhstan and/or the Ministry of Internal Affairs perform indigenous marches that are native to Kazakhstan and were made by Kazakh composers. The Military Band Service is responsible for the organization, layout, and instruction of all military bands under its command. The most notable Kazakh military band is the Presidential Band of the State Security Service of the Republic of Kazakhstan, which is used for state ceremonies carried out by the State Security Service of Kazakhstan in the presence of the President of Kazakhstan in his/her position as the Supreme Commander in Chief of the national military. Military bands are also maintained in the Ministry of Defense and the National Guard, as well as in the four regional commands of the country. Most of the leadership in these bands also work in the State Concert Band of the Republic of Kazakhstan.

=== Laos ===
Laotian military bands under the command of the Lao People's Armed Forces follow the military format and tradition of military bands from Vietnam and China. The Vietnam People's Army often provides music lessons to musical soldiers of military bands in Laos.

=== Lebanon ===
The sole military band in Lebanon is known simply as the Army Band, providing support to the Army Command and its units. It follows the French precedent as well as an indigenous Arab format for military bands. It is the descendant of a band called the "Band of the Armies of the Levant" that was formed following the First World War. It was later renamed "The Band of the post" and became a sub-unit of the Republican Guard in the 70s, is known as the "Company of the Army Band". It is presently stationed at Karantina Barracks in Beirut. It is modelled more on that of the Republican Guard with the main band and a fanfare band section.

=== Malaysia ===
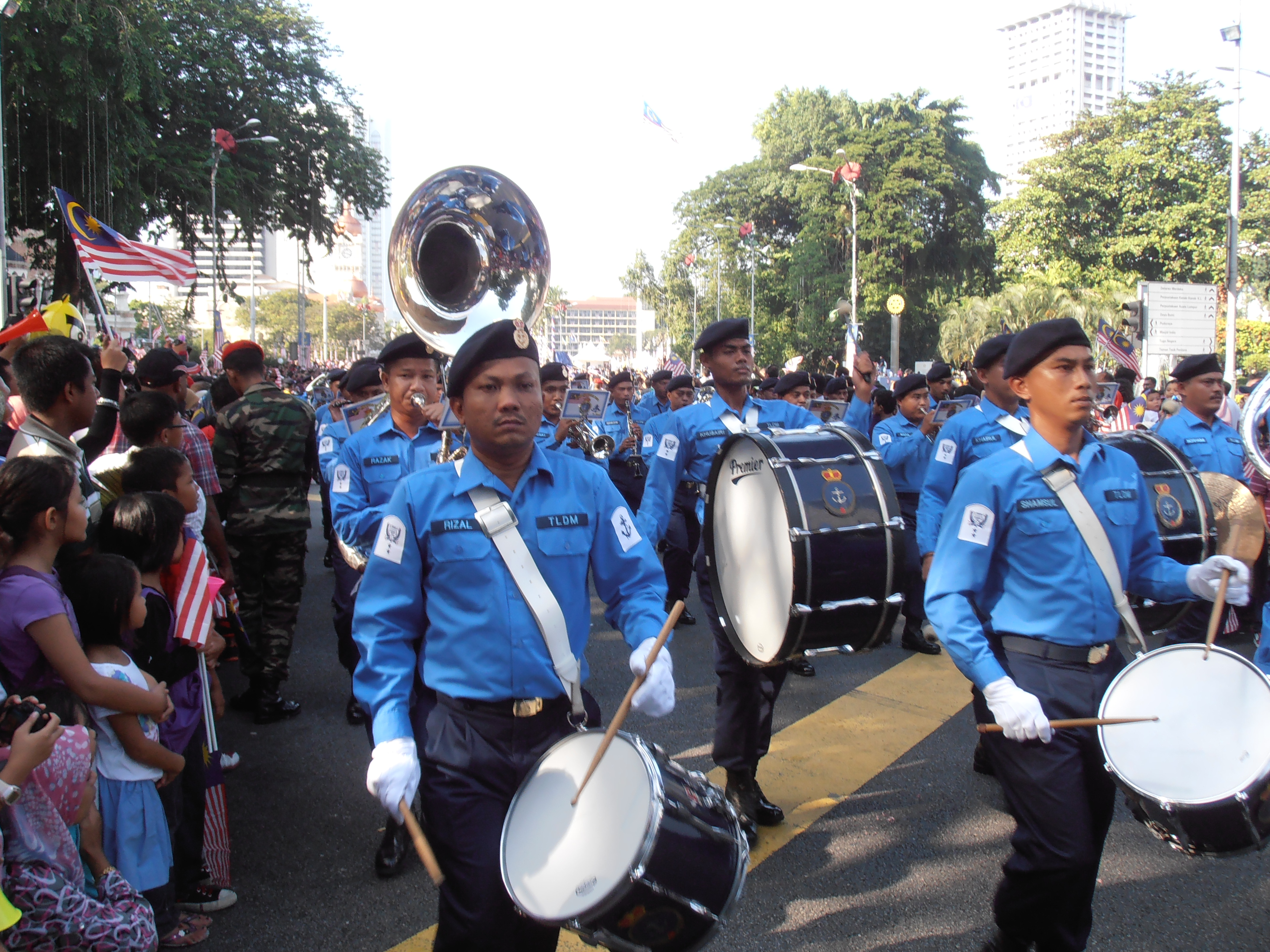
The bands of the Royal Malaysian Navy during the 2012 Hari Merdeka parade, in Kuala Lumpur.

Malaysian military bands are led by the percussion (snare drums either slung or mounted, bass drums, single and multiple tenor drums, cymbals and sometimes glockenspiels), and followed by the brass and woodwinds (with the addition of trumpets, mellophones, marching baritone, contrabass bugles and sousaphones), following a formation format that is similar to the Royal Marines Bands Service and former Royal Navy bands, and inspired by its long cultural heritage in music.

The following military bands are based in Kuala Lumpur and support the Malaysian Armed Forces:

- Central Band of the Royal Malay Regiment
- Central Band of the Malaysian Armed Forces
- Malaysian Army Central Band
- Central Band of the Royal Ranger Regiment
- Band of the Royal Military Police
- Royal Malaysian Air Force Central Band
- Royal Malaysian Navy Central Band
- Band of the National Defence University
- Band of the Royal Military College

Also stationed in the capital are the following paramilitary styled bands:

- Royal Malaysian Police Central Band
- Central Band of the Prisons Department
- Kuala Lumpur City Band
- Central Band of the Malaysian Maritime Enforcement Agency
- Central Band of the People's Volunteer Corps
- Central Band of the Malaysian Fire and Rescue Department
- Central Band of the Malaysian Civil Defence Force
- Central Band of the Royal Customs Department

Band of Armed Forces and police formations are stationed in all the states and federal territories. In particular the following states are served by the bands of the Armed Forces formations save for Johor, which is served by both the Band of the Royal Johor Military Force and the Brigade Band of the 21st Special Forces Group:

- Kelantan: Central Band of the Royal Artillery Regiment
- Selangor: Band of the National Hydrographic Centre RMN
- Perak: Band of the Royal Engineers Regiment
- Pahang: Band of the Royal Malaysian Air Force Pahang
- Sarawak: Band of the 10th Battalion, Royal Ranger Regiment
- Sabah: Band of the 11th Battalion Royal Malay Regiment and Sandakan Band of the Royal Malaysian Navy
- Perlis: Central Band of the Border Regiment and 30 Border Brigade
- Terengganu: Central Band of the Royal Armoured Corps
- Kedah: Band of 5th Battalion Royal Malay Regiment and Band of the Royal Malaysian Air Force Academy
- Malacca: Band of the 10th Parachute Brigade
- Negeri Sembilan:Band of the Royal Signals Regiment and Training Band of the Malaysian Army Military School of Music

Pipe bands are maintained by battalions of the Royal Malay Regiment, Royal Ranger Regiment and the Royal Armoured Corps.

=== Mongolia ===
Musicians of the Mongolian 014 Construction Unit in 2013.

Military bands in the Mongolian Armed Forces and the preceding Mongolian People's Army followed the Russian model and utilized many Russian aspects used in the 20th century. Prior to the expansion of China's Qing Dynasty into what is now Mongolia, traditional Mongol Empire-era instrumentation was used in bands for hundreds of years. During a visit of the Bogd Khanate Prime Minister Tögs-Ochiryn Namnansüren to St. Petersburg, Russia in late 1913 and early 1914, he an artillery band was present to perform for him. Impressed by the military band, he requested that the Russian government give him brass musical instruments so that he could form a local band of close to a dozen musicians. This gave way for what would become the first modern military band in the country. The country currently operates three military bands: The Military Band of the General Staff, the Military Music College of the National Defense University and the Mongolian Military Song and Dance Academic Ensemble. Notable Mongolian military musicians include Colonel Navaany Tserenpil (1914–1978, commonly called the Mongolian March King), Ganbat Yondondüichiriin (born 1951) and Pürevjavyn Khayankhyarvaa (born 1935). As part of the expansion of the army in the late 1960s, the Minister of Defense organized the Music Group of the Civil Defense, which has since 2009, been known as the Emergency Services Band under the National Emergency Management Agency.

=== Myanmar ===
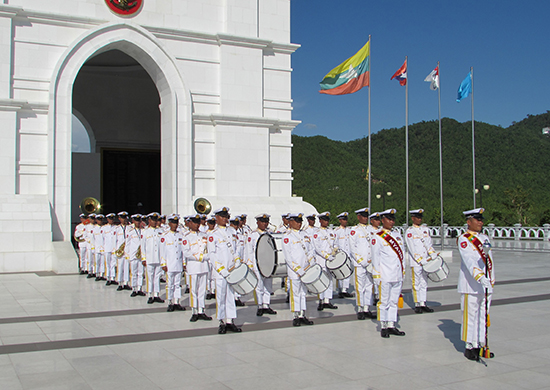
A Tatmadaw band in a regular parade configuration

Band formations in the Tatmadaw follow the former British pattern, especially of the bands of the Royal Marines Band Service and the former Royal Navy bands. The Central Military Band of the Myanmar Armed Forces was formed on 30 November 1988 in the Hmawbi Township of the Yangon Region. Other service bands were formed in October 1991. On 23 April 1997, the ceremonial Honor Guard Troop as well as music bands from the Army, Navy, and Air Force were combined to form the Honor Guard and Military Music Troop of the Tatmadaw. On 4 February 2006 the Honor Guard and Military Music Troop was transferred to the capital of Naypyidaw. All army Regional Military Command (RMCs) maintain military bands. The 240-member Myanmar Police Band, which is the country's oldest brass band (it was formed in 1945), also serves as a type of military band as it is part of the Armed Forces.

=== North Korea ===
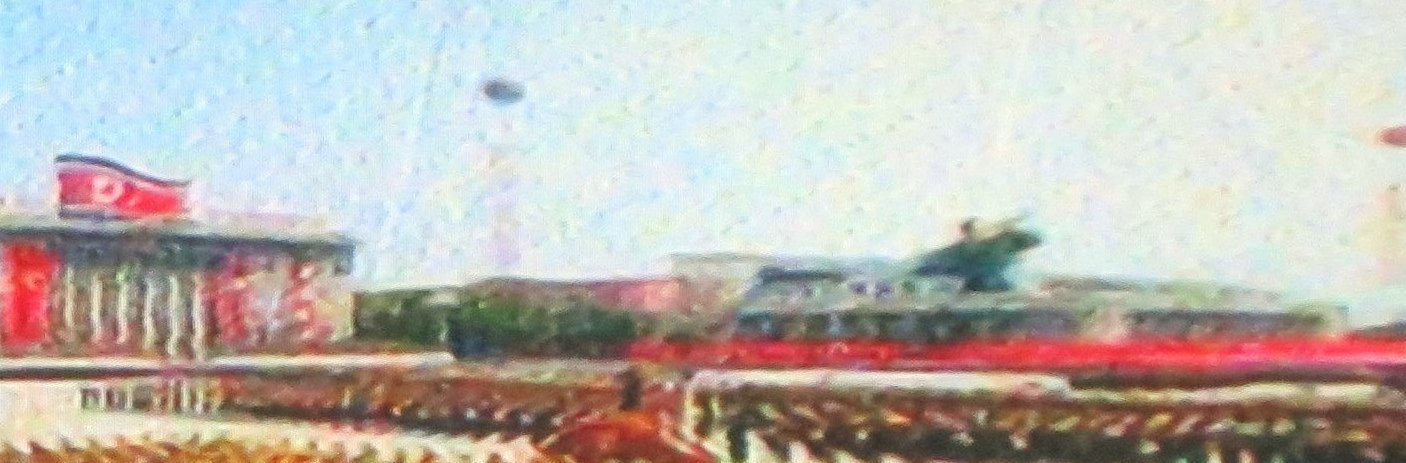
The North Korean combined military bands are known for their complex marching styles.

The bands of the Korean People's Army and the Korean People's Social Security Forces follow the general instrumental setup of Daechwitas, the Korean traditional military bands. They also resemble Russian and Chinese military bands, adopting the Soviet tradition of adding chromatic fanfare trumpeters when in massed bands formation. As in keeping with the Songun policy and Juche ideology within the KPA, as directly reporting units of its General Political Bureau, most of its repertoire is made up locally composed marches, plus classical and modern music adapted for the band. Until 2013 French horns formed the front rank of the Pyongyang parade massed bands, today they are fronted by Wagner tubas and euphoniums.

North Korean bands are known around the world for their marching techniques and their complex marching maneuvers, some of which are only found in large college marching bands such as the Fightin' Texas Aggie Band, and a tradition which began in 1997. The military bands in the KPA and police bands in the KPISF are led by a Conductor or Director of Music, with a Drum Major joining him or her to mark the pace of the bands, if in massed bands formation, they are led by a Senior Director of Music, 2–6 conductors, 4–8 bandmasters and 5 to 6 drum majors (with 2 female drum majors included).

=== Oman ===
The Omani Royal Guard Military Band is the official music band of the Royal Guard of Oman and the most senior military band of the Sultan of Oman's Armed Forces. It is specifically designed to provide ceremonial honours to the Sultan of Oman and the House of Al Said in all settings including arrival ceremonies at Al Alam Palace. The band operates the Royal Oman Symphony Orchestra, pipe band formations and a school of music. The RGO sports what is the only camel mounted pipe band known as the Royal Cavalry Mounted Band, whose horses consist a mix of Arabs, Clydesdales and Shires.

The Royal Army of Oman, the Royal Navy of Oman, and Royal Air Force of Oman also maintain their own separate military brass and pipe bands.

The Air Force Band was conceived in the early 1980s when Sultan Qaboos bin Said issued Royal directives for the formation of the Sultan of Oman Air Force Band. In June 1990 the name of was changed to Royal of Oman Air Force (RAFO) Band.

All these bands and pipe bands, as well as the mounted bands, follow the British precedent, with ceremonial bugle platoons and fanfare trumpet teams. The band formation is modeled more on the Royal Marines Band Service.

=== Pakistan ===
Military bands in Pakistan are derived from the British format and are closely associated with the format followed by their neighbors in India. The Pakistan Armed Forces Band is the chief military band in the country. All army musicians are trained by the Army School of Music, which was raised in Abbottabad in 1956 and have been linked with the Baloch Regimental Centre since 1965. It has the sole purpose of training officers and soldiers serving in both military bands and pipe bands.

The following bands are in the armed forces:

- Pakistan Army Armoured Corps Centre Band (Nowshera)
- Pakistan Army Artillery Regiment Centre Band (Attock Cantonment)
- Pakistan Army Air Defence Corps Centre Band (Malir Cantonment)
- Pakistan Army Corps of Signals Training Centre Band (Kohat Cantonment)
- Punjab Regiment Centre Band (Mardan Cantonment)
- Baloch Regiment Centre Band (Abbottabad)
- Frontier Force Regiment Centre Band (Abbottabad)
- Azad Kashmir Regiment Centre Band (Manser Camp)
- Sind Regiment Centre Band (Hyderabad Cantonment)
- Northern Light Infantry Centre Band (Bunji)
- Pakistan Army Service Corps Centre Band (Nowshera)
- Pakistan Army Medical Corps Centre Band (Abbottabad)
- Pakistan Army Corps of Electrical and Mechanical Engineering Centre Band (Quetta Cantonment)
- Pakistan Army Ordnance Corps Centre Band (Malir Cantonment)
- Pakistan Military Academy Band (Kakul, Abbottabad)

The Azad Kashmir Regiment Pipe Band is considered to be the best of Army, having represented PA internationally multiple times.

The following bands are part of the Pakistani Navy: Naval HQ Band Islamabad, Navy Band Lahore. The paramilitary Pakistan Rangers and the Frontier Corps also maintain military bands and pipes and drums are well. The Desert Rangers maintain a camel mounted band that consists of pipers and brass players in the unit.

=== Philippines ===
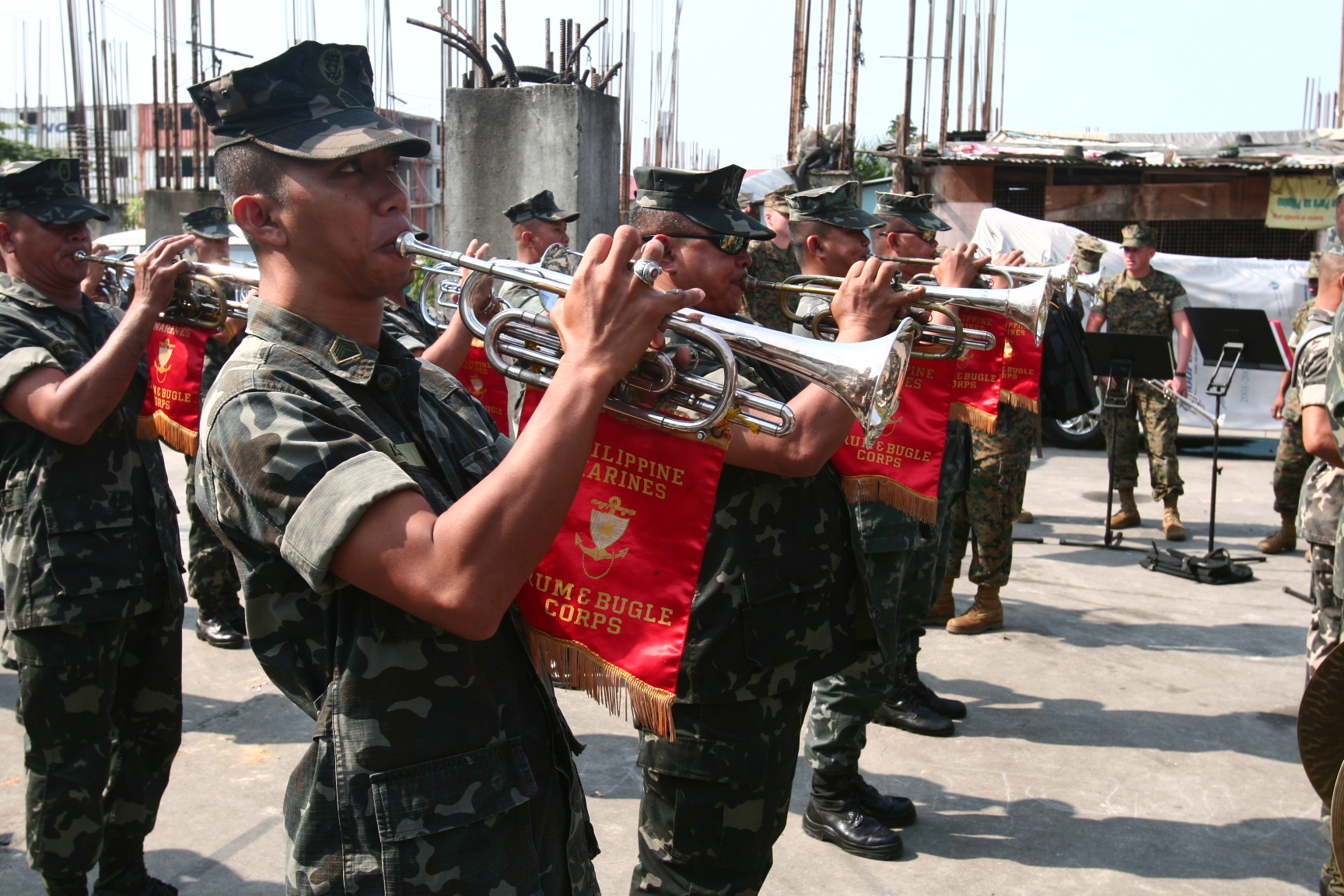
Buglers of the Philippine Marine Corps Drum and Bugle Team. The team is the only drum and bugle band in the Armed Forces of the Philippines.

The military band tradition in the Philippines is modeled primarily on the traditions of military bands of the United States and Spain since it was their respective armed forces that brought the Western march and military band tradition to the islands.

The Philippine Army Band is the main military band of the Philippine Army, and the seniormost marching band of the Armed Forces of the Philippines (AFP). It was founded as the Philippine Constabulary Band in the early 1900s, and was eventually reorganized into the Philippine Army Orchestra, and then the Philippine Army Headquarters Band. Currently, the Philippine Army Band is composed of 74 musicians who are under the leadership of Captain Ronel A. Rabot. It is an army service support unit, so, therefore, it is under the administrative command of the Philippine Army Reserve Command. The Philippine Marine Corps Drum and Bugle Team (MDBT) is the prime musical unit of the Philippine Marine Corps and the only Drum and Bugle Corps in the entire AFP. It is inspired by the United States Marine Drum and Bugle Corps and is based at Rudiardo Brown Marine Barracks in Taguig. The Presidential Security Command, the Philippine Navy, and the Philippine Air Force also maintain their own marching bands, as well as the paramilitary Philippine Coast Guard under the Department of Transportation. In addition the General Headquarters Band of the Armed Forces, based in Quezon City, is the official band of the Armed Forces and serves as protocol band for the Secretary of National Defense. The GHQ Band was established in the 1950s to provide the Armed Forces with a separate band of its own drawn from personnel from all branches of the armed forces.

As a general rule bandsmen wear the service dress, duty or combat dress uniform of their service branch. Enlisted personnel of the Philippine Military Academy Band use American style enlisted rank insignia in their service dark blues, worn with either the peaked cap or the shako with black hackle. The Philippine Army Band, assigned to the Escort and Security Battalion, wears the unit's First Republic styled rayadillo uniforms with straw tricorne-style hats with the drum major wearing a pith helmet, with similar uniforms worn by the PSC Band.

=== Singapore ===
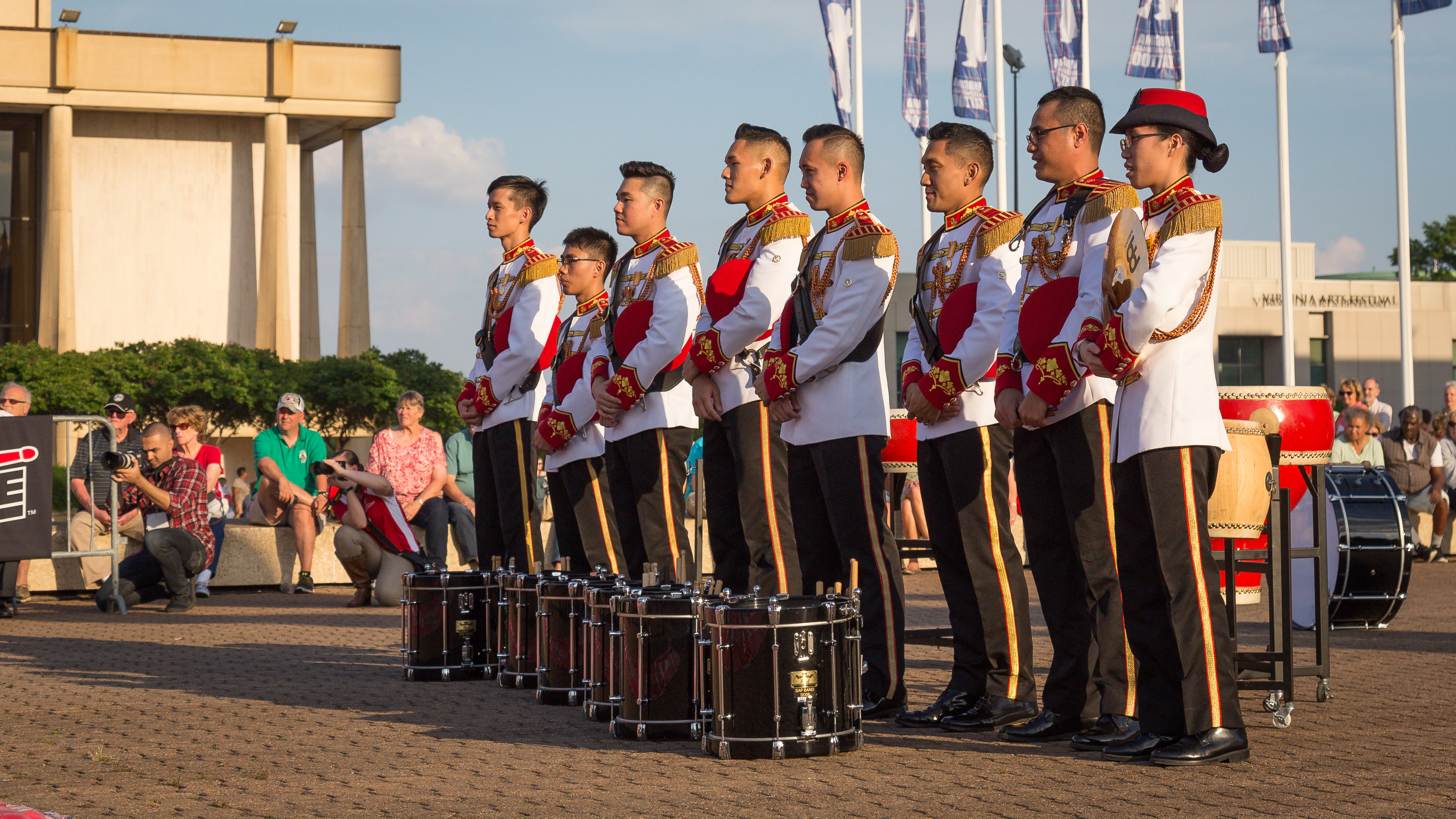
The Singapore Armed Forces Band's drumline at the Virginia International Tattoo in 2017.

Until the 1990s the Singapore Armed Forces and Singapore Police Force band formations were similar to the Royal Marines Band Service, and Malaysian military bands. In the beginning of the 21st century this was changed to a format similar to British Army and Royal Air Force military bands before returning to the RMBS precedence in 2020. The Singapore Armed Forces Band form the Singapore Armed Forces musical arm, which plays a vital role in parades and ceremonies such as the Singapore National Day Parade. Before the 1994 unification of SAF Bands under one unit, the different service arms of the SAF fielded their own bands, which would make up the combined inter-service massed bands for the NDP from 1987 to 1997. Since 1986, all the three bands of the SAF, as well as the Band Training Wing, are manned by both male and female bandsmen reflecting the country's diverse ethnicities.

The band service traces their origins to the beginning of Singapore's self-governance. The Singapore Infantry Regiment Band (current Ceremonial Band A and formerly the Staff Band of the Singapore Military Forces) was raised in 1958 alongside its then parent unit, and was briefly rebadged as the Singapore Army Band in the 1980s. In 1972, the current form of three bands was finalized when what are now the SAF Central Band and Ceremonial Band B were made operational, and both moved to other branches in the 70s and 80s, becoming the Republic of Singapore Navy Band in 1977 and the Republic of Singapore Air Force Band in 1982. Their first appearance together in the NDP was in 1987's edition in the Padang conducted by the SAF's first Senior Director of Music MAJ Erwin Dragon, with another joint performance in 1990. 1988 saw the rebirth of the SAF Music Board and the formation of the SAF Symphonic Wind Band.

=== South Korea ===
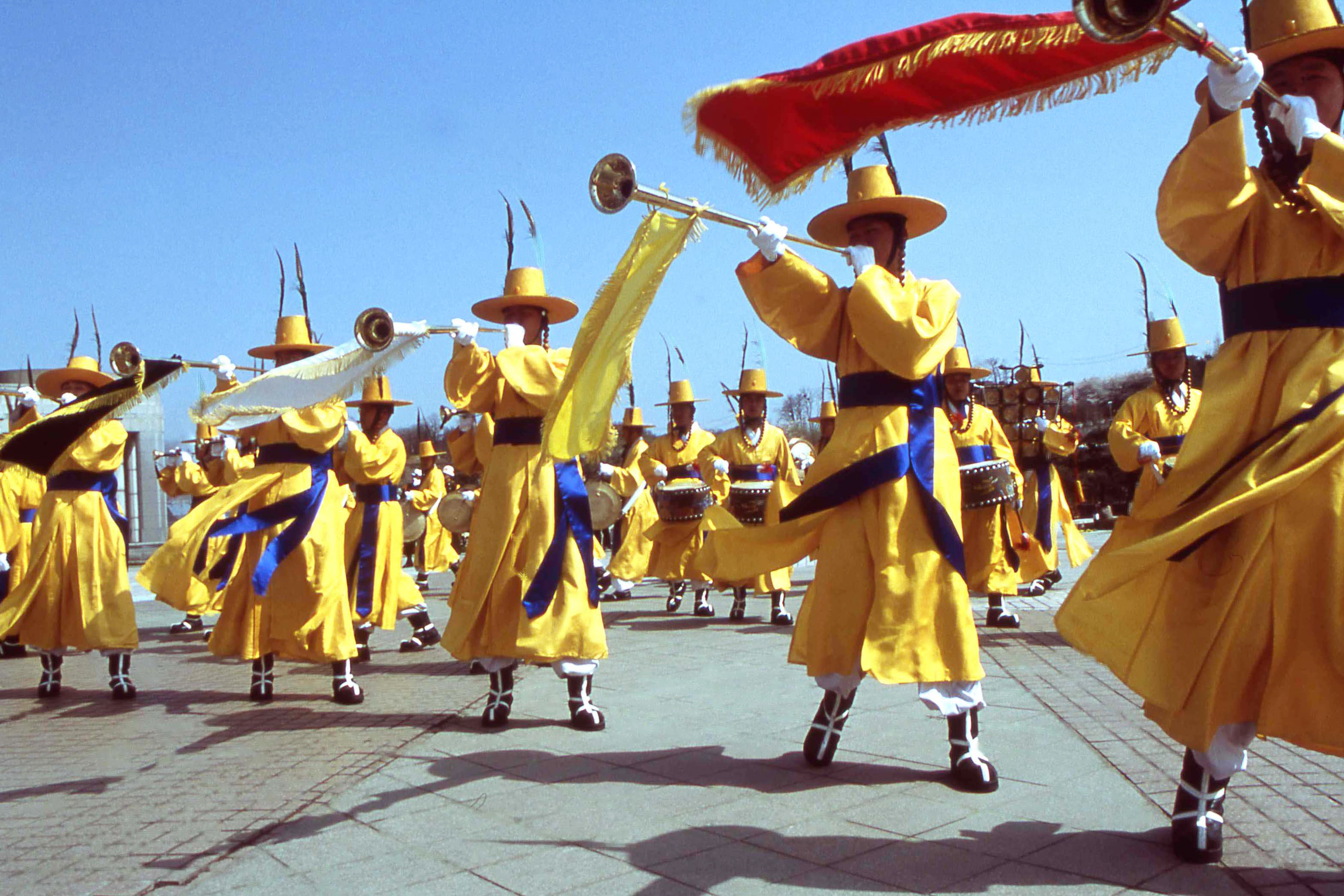
The Republic of Korea Army maintains a traditional daechwita band.

Although patterned after American and British military bands, the bands of the Republic of Korea are also inspired by the daechwita of the old Korean kingdoms. Their formation mirrors American and British military band formations. The Republic of Korea Army maintains a Traditional Band playing in the daechwita styles of old, using Korean traditional musical instruments.

The Republic of Korea Armed Forces (South Korean Armed Forces) maintains a number of bands including the Republic of Korea Air Force Band, the Republic of Korea Army Band, the Republic of Korea Navy Band, the Republic of Korea Marine Corps Band. In addition to the main bands of the service branches, the Republic of Korean Armed Forces also maintains a Traditional Daechwita Band of the Armed Forces, as well as military bands in its military academies, including the Band of the Korea Military Academy, the Band of the Korea Naval Academy, and the Band of the Korea Air Force Academy.

When military bands were originally formed in South Korea, American military music was the primary type of musical accompaniment used by ROK bands, as the bands were formed with United States assistance, with later influences from bands of the other armed forces which assisted the ROKAF during the Korean War (Canada and Greece for example). Later on in the 1970s, Korean martial and traditional music were incorporated into the repertoire of the bands, including modernized adaptations of folk songs for performances during concerts.

=== Taiwan ===
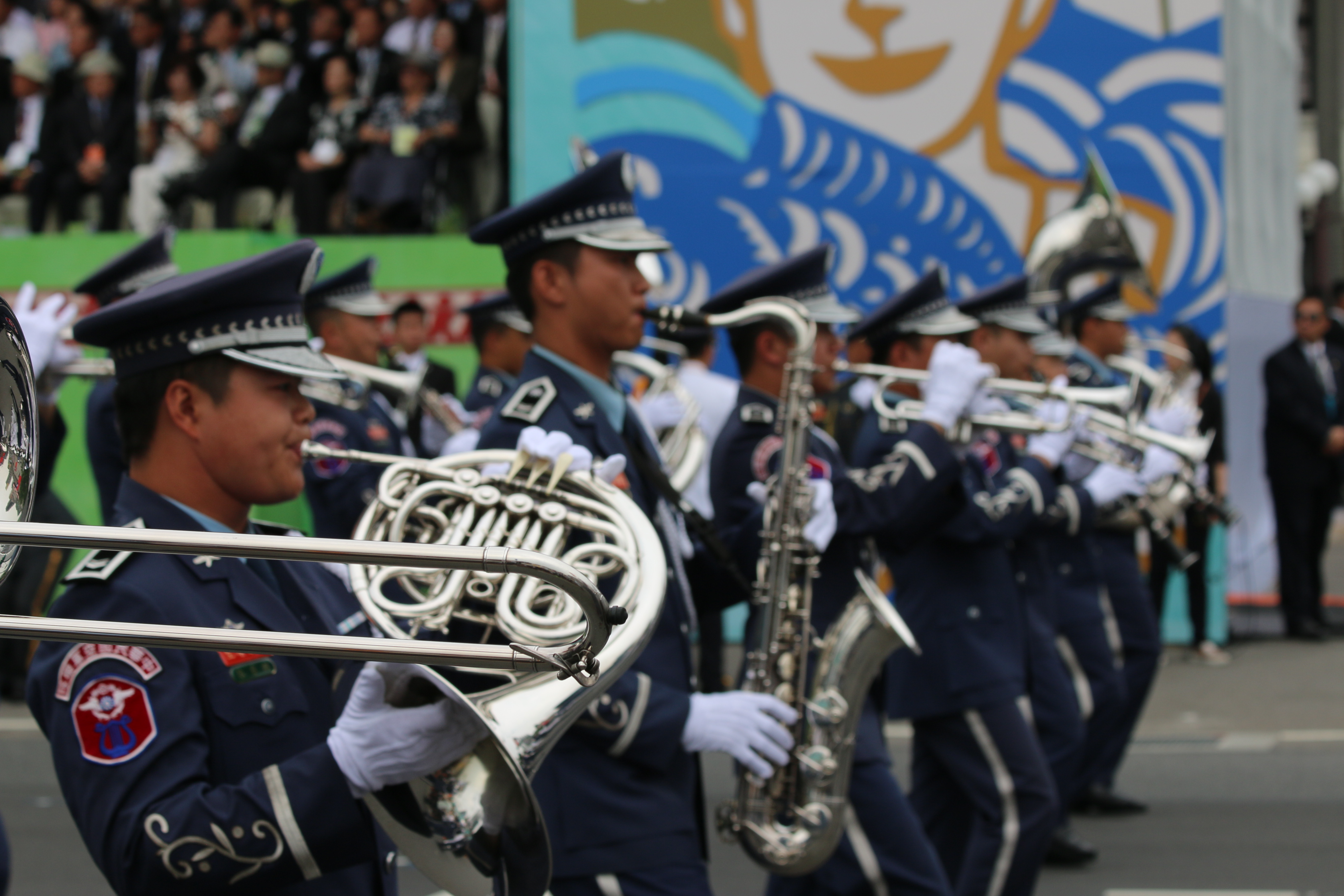
The Republic of China's Air Force Band is one of several bands in the Republic of China Armed Forces.

Military bands of the Republic of China (ROC) can trace their origins to the 1911 revolution. Existing military band units include:

- ROC Ministry of National Defense Symphony Orchestra (國防部示範樂隊)
- ROC Army Band (中華民國陸軍樂隊)
- ROC Navy Band (中華民國海軍樂隊)
- ROC Marine Corps Band (中華民國海軍陸戰隊軍樂隊)
- ROC Air Force Band (中華民國空軍樂隊)
- ROC Military Police Band (中華民國憲兵軍樂隊)
- ROC Navy Academy Marching Band (海軍軍官學校軍樂隊)
- ROC Military Academy Marching Band (陸軍軍官校軍樂隊)
- ROC Air Force Academy Marching Band (空軍軍官學校軍樂隊)
- ROC Army Academy Military Band (陸軍專科學校軍樂隊)

All these bands are inspired by American and German military band traditions, and their formation mirrors those used by United States military bands. Taiwan also has a great military drum and bugle corps tradition as well with a few military drum and bugle corps in active service, with their formations not quite similar to the American corps. Corps style marching bands may also be found in the Armed Forces Preparatory School and the Republic of China Army Academy.

=== Thailand ===
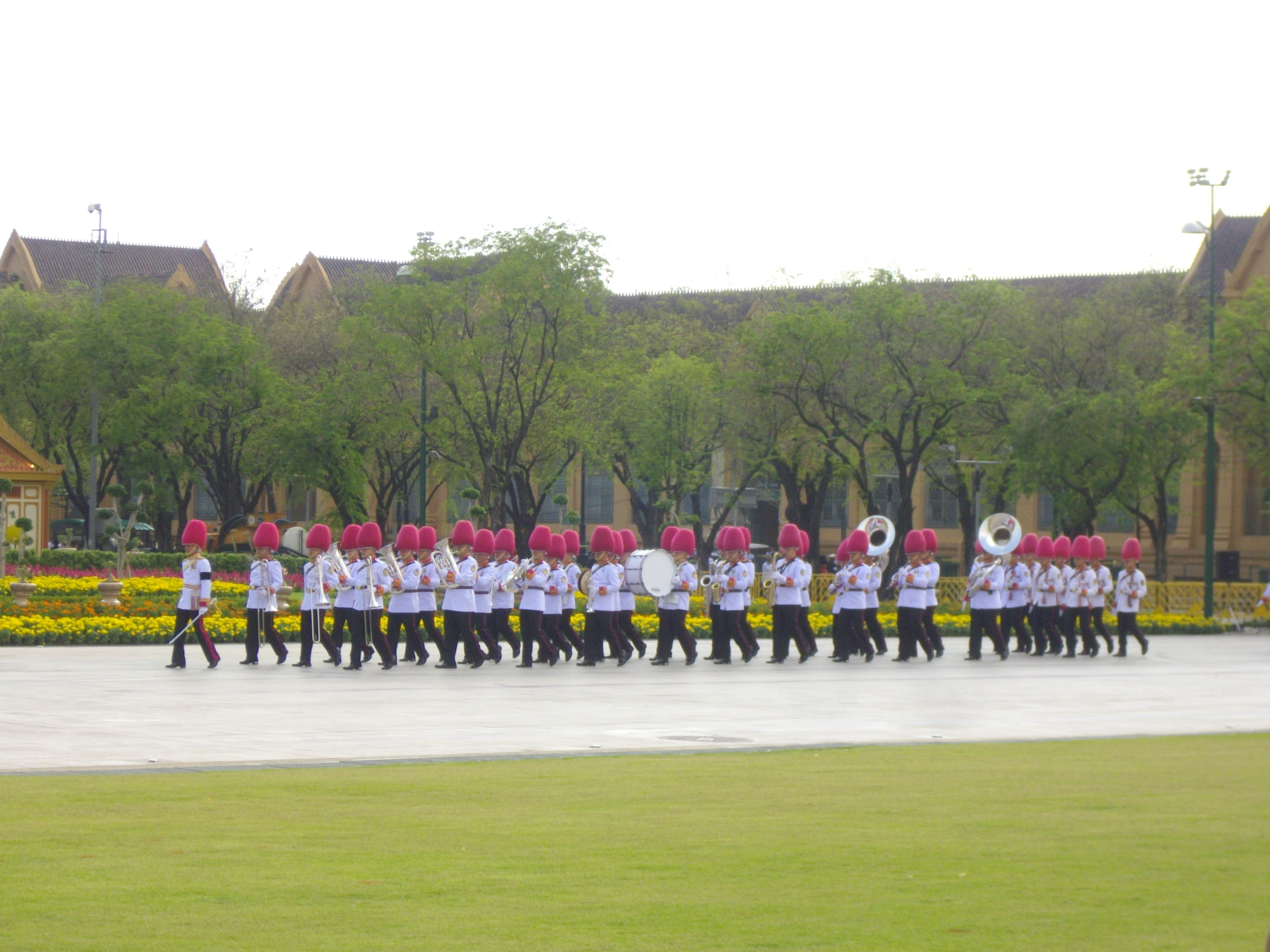
The band for the 3rd Infantry Battalion, 1st Infantry Regiment performing at the royal funeral for Bejaratana, in Bangkok, Thailand

Military bands in Thailand were inspired by British military bands, although they play uniquely Thai military marches. The ceremony has been performed during the Trooping of the Colours ceremonies in Bangkok every December 2 since 1953, and at every military function attended by the Royal Family and other military officers and local executives, together with the general public.

Thai military bands' formations closely follow either that of the British Royal Marines Band Service, being that the percussion are at the front rather than the middle, followed by the main band itself or that of the British Army's Household Division Foot Guards Bands, being that the percussion are at the middle of the main band. But another formation followed is that of the Brazilian military bands, wherein the percussion are in front of the brass and winds, with the bass drums as the lead instruments. These bands are led by a Drum Major and the Director of Music.

The massed military bands of the Thai Armed Forces that are involved with the Thai Royal Guards parade include following bands whose combined strength is up to 180 musicians who are under the direction of the Director of Music of the Bangkok Garrison District:

- Band of the 1st Battalion, 1st Infantry Regiment, King's Own Bodyguard
- Band of the 3rd Battalion, 1st Infantry Regiment, King's Own Bodyguard
- Band of the 1st Battalion, 11th Infantry Regiment, King's Guard
- Regimental Band of the Chulachomklao Royal Military Academy
- Band of the 2nd Battalion, 11th Infantry Regiment, King's Guard
- Band of the 1st Battalion, 21st Infantry Regiment, Queen's Guard
- Band of the 1st Battalion, 31st Infantry Regiment, King's Guard
- Regimental Band of the Navaminda Kasatriyadhiraj Royal Thai Air Force Academy

The Royal Thai Navy Music Division has existed since the existence of a naval department of the Royal Thai Army.

=== Turkey ===
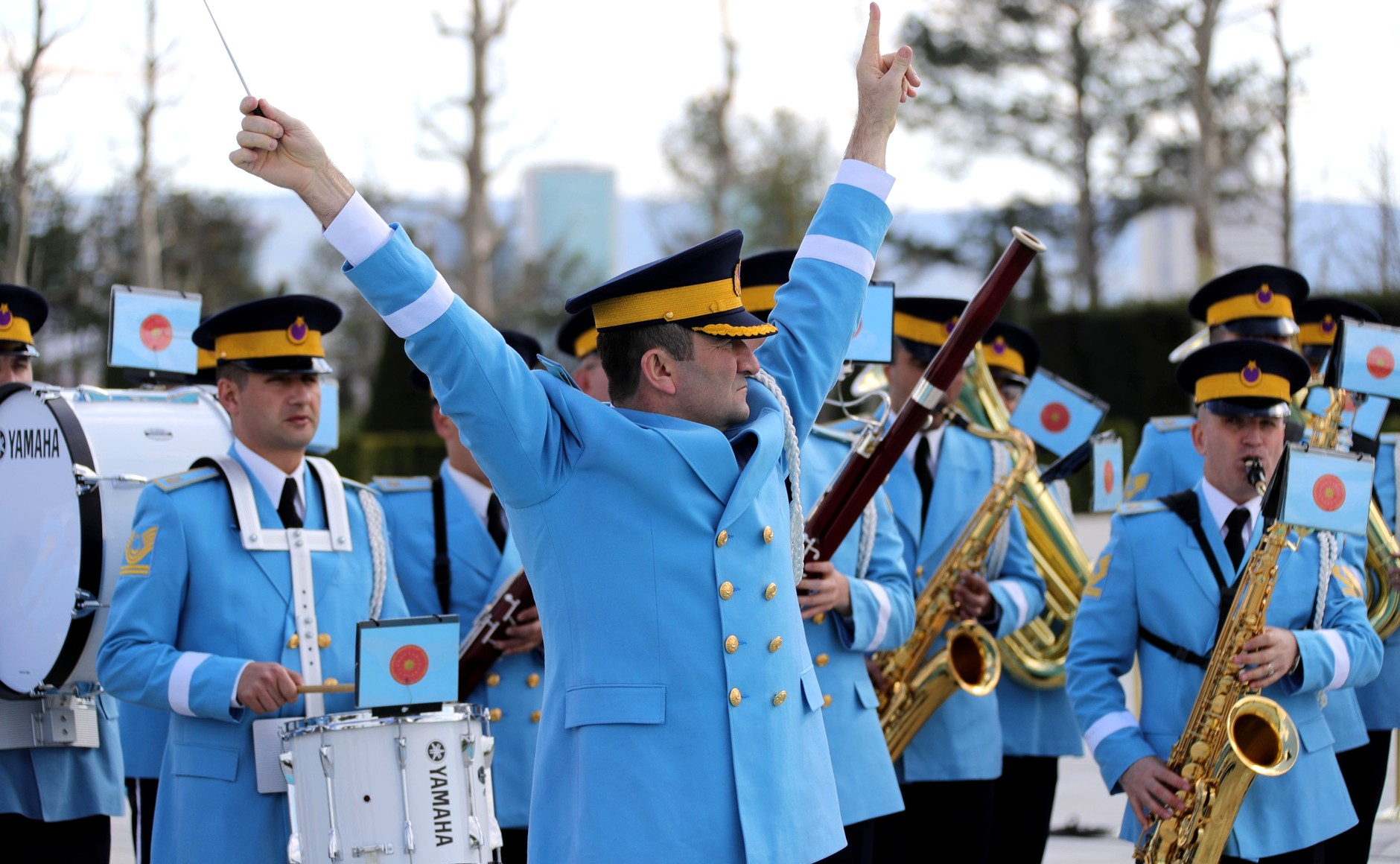
The bandmaster of the Harmonic Band of the Turkish Armed Forces.

The Ottoman military band style is retained today through the Armed Forces Mehter Unit (Mehter Bölüğü) at the Istanbul Military Museum (Askeri Müze). It is based on a tradition that can be dated back to the 13th century and even further back. It has participated in ceremonies in Germany, Russia and Azerbaijan where it presents itself as a historical unit. Other military bands existed with a more European tradition due to the influence of the Italian Instructor General of the Imperial Ottoman Music Giuseppe Donizetti. With the declaration of the Republic, military bands were expanded in their organization in the newly formed Armed Forces to a more western format. This was done by order President Atatürk to establish culture of the arts in the new republic. On the other hand, the instrument of Turkish origin, the Turkish crescent, is commonly displayed during military band formations in Turkey and around the world.

Nowadays, the regular bands of the Turkish Armed Forces have continued to follow a more Western pattern, with the Harmonic Band of the Turkish Armed Forces being the seniormost and oldest of its kind in modern-day Turkey, being founded in 1826 by order of Ottoman Sultan Mahmud II under the name of "Musika-i Hümayun" (Royal Band in Ottoman Turkish). Prior to its establishment, Janissary bands were the only protocol bands utilized in the Ottoman Army. As part of Atatürk's cultural reform, it was moved to Ankara with the administration of Osman Zeki Üngör and was separated from present-day presidential symphony orchestra in 1933 under the command of Turkish Armed Forces. The harmonic band performs protocol duties at the Çankaya Köşkü (the official residence of the Prime Minister of Turkey until 2014) in Ankara, formerly with the honour guard of the Presidential Guard Regiment and currently with ceremonial units of the Gendarmerie.

The Turkish Gendarmerie also maintains its own military band, alongside the bands of the official branches of the military. The Turkish Air Force Command maintains its own marching and dance band, both founded in 1961 with the directive of the Air Force Commander İrfan Tansel. The Turkish Armed Forces School of Music provides musical training and education to all current and potential members of these bands.

A Drum and Bugle Corps is also maintained in the Naval High School of the Turkish Navy. There are three independent jazz orchestras within the TAF: "Türkay" of the Land Forces Command, the "Eagles of Jazz" in the Air Force and Starfish Jazz Orchestra from the Naval Forces Command. The latter was formed in 2008 consists of non-commissioned officers, being considered to be the "flagship" of Turkish jazz. The harmonic band has a specialized small ensemble called Harmony Stars Orchestra, which was established within the body of harmonic band in 2006.

=== Uzbekistan ===
Military bands in Uzbekistan were inspired and follow the pattern of Russian military bands. On top of this, the Armed Forces of Uzbekistan pioneered a specific tradition with military bands, having a different march step and repertoire. The Band of the Ministry of Defense of the Republic of Uzbekistan is the seniormost band in the military that reports directly to the Uzbek Defense Minister. It is primarily responsible for the arrival ceremony at the Kuksaroy Presidential Palace for world leaders visiting Tashkent.

The band operates as a music center for the military, having authority over other affiliated military bands such as the following district bands:

- Band of the Tashkent Military District
- Band of the Northwest Military District
- Band of the Southwest Special Military District
- Band of the Central Military District
- Band of the Eastern Military District

The Ministry of Internal Affairs operates several musical ensembles, including the Exemplary Band of the MVD (founded in 1993), of which notable members included Lieutenant Colonel Yunus Gulzarov and its founder Colonel Grigor Terzyan. The Band of the Academy of the Ministry of Internal Affairs was founded in 1981 as a military band for the Tashkent MVD High School, beginning its public activities in the 1982 academic year. In 1992, Lieutenant Khasan Nazarov took control of the band, re branding it to reflect the new name of the school. It was originally a volunteer band composed of unpaid musicians from the academy. This would change in 2004 when its members were replaced with professional Uzbek musicians.

The Band of the Uzbekistan National Guard supports the musical activities of the National Guard. Founded in 1944, the Republican Specialized Academic Lyceum of Music of the National Guard provides special military training for musicians in their youth aged 14 to 18 like the Moscow Military Music College in Russia.

Other bands include those that are part of the Chirchiq Higher Tank Command and Engineering School and the Frontier Service.

=== Vietnam ===
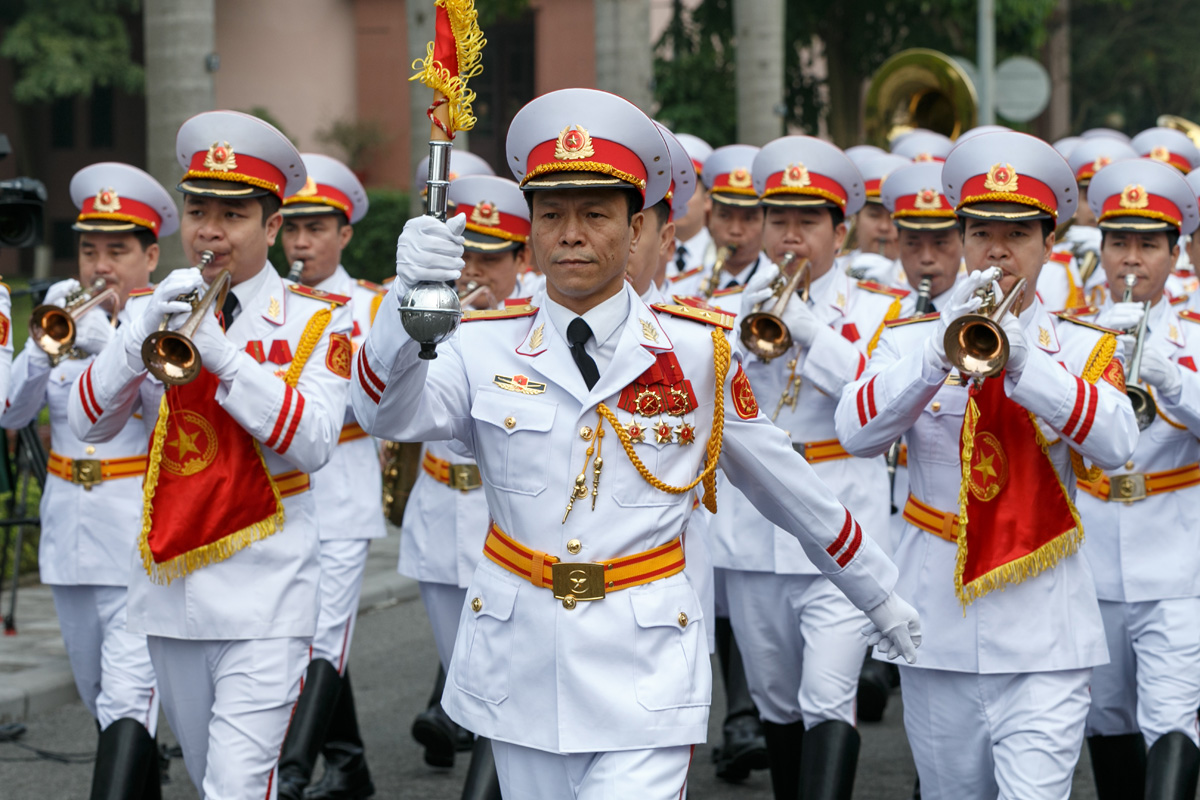
Band for the Military Honour Guard Battalion of the Vietnam People's Army.

Modern military bands that are part of the People's Army of Vietnam are heavily influenced and inspired by military bands in Russia and China, as well as bands from their former pre-independence colonizer, France. The first modern military bands in Vietnam were organized between 1944 and 1954, during the first 10 years of the establishment of the Socialist Republic of Vietnam. The Military Band of the General Staff Command of the Military Honour Guard Battalion of the Vietnam People's Army supports the ceremonial activities of the VPA and is the seniormost band of the armed forces, with bands stationed in formations from the regimental level above and in all educational institutions. Military bands are also maintained in the Vietnam People's Public Security.

== Military bands in Europe ==
=== Austria ===
Military bands of Austria are for the most part similar to the German musical format, although some military bands lack a Corps of Drums, which is the most notable part of the German format. The Gardemusik Wien of the Guard Battalion is the seniormost band in the armed forces and is the one responsible for playing at all state ceremonies and events.

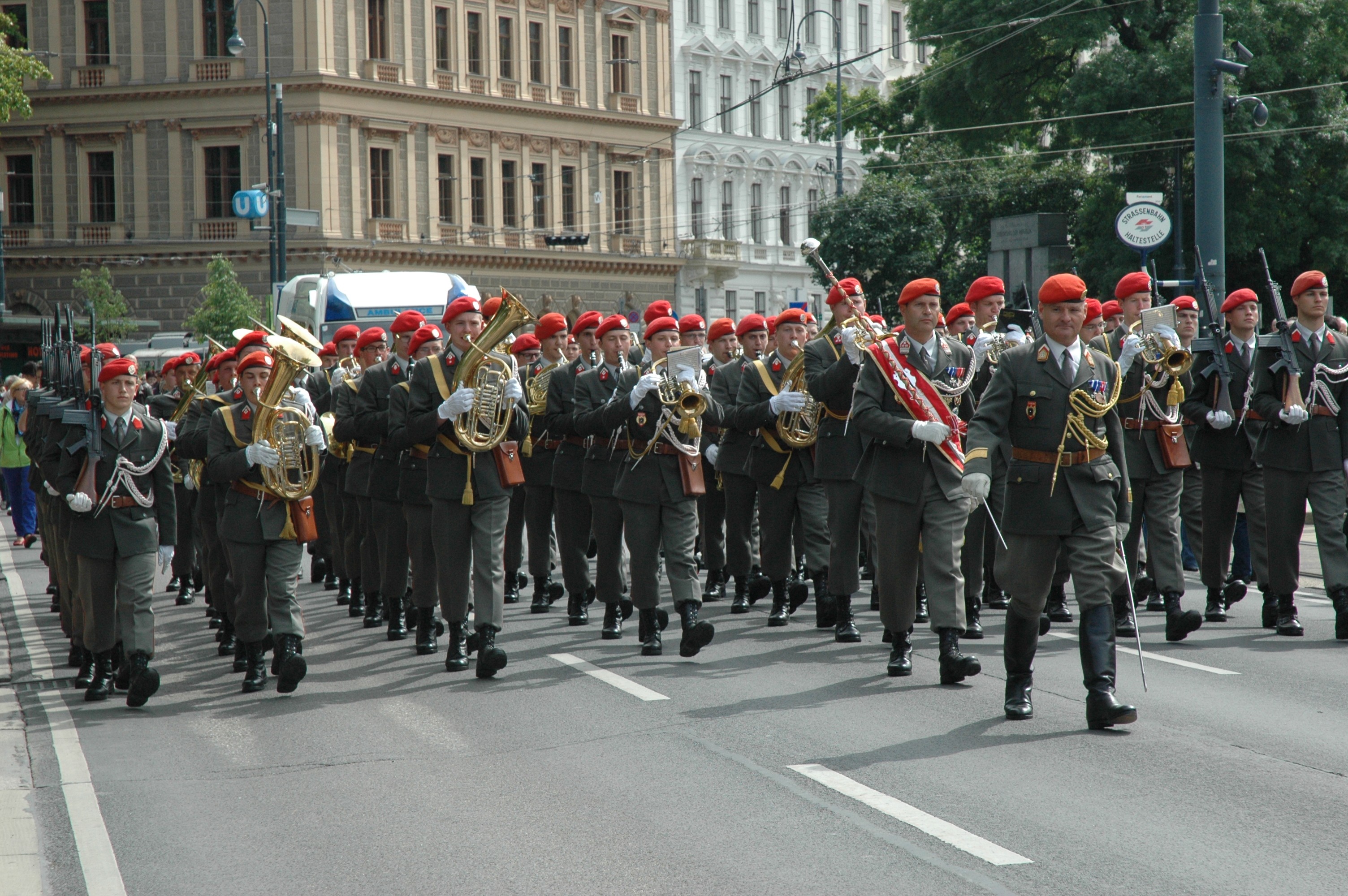
The Gardemusik Wien at the 34th Austrian Brass Music Festival

The first military bands in Austria were organized in 1741, with ensembles being restricted to infantry and artillery units. They reached their golden age between the 1820s and the mid-1840s, being inspired by French military tradition and reforms. Military bands at this point, were led by a director of music and were composed of 50-60 civilian musicians. By the turn of the 20th century, Austrian Military Music Bands included 178 regimental bands in the Army alone (majority in the infantry), which was composed of over 10,000 musicians. Outside the Gardemusik, military bands are divided into the following regional bands:

- Military Band Burgenland
- Military Band Kärnten
- Military Band Niederösterreich
- Military Band Oberösterreich
- Military Band Salzburg
- Military Band Steiermark
- Military Band Tirol
- Military Band Vorarlberg

From October 2014, the abandonment of five Austrian military bands, including the military band in Vorarlberg, was discussed for cost reasons. In December 2014, the government agreed to keep the nine locations with a reduced staff. Instead of the previous 47, there are to be 20 musicians per state in the future. In May 2016, during the Austrian governors' conference, together with Defense Minister Hans Peter Doskozil, it was decided to that military bands should be preserved in every federal state, consisting of 43 to 47 musicians.

=== Belarus ===
The massed bands of the Military Band Service of the Armed Forces of the Republic of Belarus follow the Russian traditional model with elements of Belarusian music in its repertoire. Regional bands from each of the military commandants form the basis of the band service along with the Exemplary Band (also known as the BelArmyBand), the Band of the Honor Guard Company, the Central Band of the Interior Ministry and the Band of the Ministry of Emergency Situations. The bands of the regional departments of the Ministry of Internal Affairs are also affiliated as well to the service.

=== Belgium ===
The Belgian Armed Forces have three professional military bands, each representing one of the service branches. Bands of the Belgian Armed Forces include the Royal Band of the Belgian Guides, the Band of the Belgian Navy, and the Royal Symphonic Band of the Belgian Air Force. All follow the British precedent due to these bands being based in the United Kingdom for much of the Second World War, with elements from the band traditions of France, the Netherlands and Germany.

The oldest and largest of these is the Royal Band of the Belgian Guides (former cavalry) dating from 1832. The bands of the Belgian Navy and of the Royal Belgian Air Component both date from 1947. The combined bands are known as the Music Bands of the Belgian Defense and consist of a total of nearly 200 professional musicians, all of whom holds a diploma from a Royal Conservatory.

=== Bulgaria ===
Military bands in Bulgaria are under the jurisdictional authority of the Bulgarian Armed Forces. They are shaped by the Russian and German examples as well as follow their own precedent. The senior band is the Representative Guards Band from the National Guards Unit. It was formerly the Central Brass Band of the Bulgarian People's Army and the Band of the Bulgarian Life Guards Squadron before that. The armed forces also maintain three service bands: the Ground Forces Band from Sofia, the Navy Band from Varna and the Air Force Band from Plovdiv.

The Ground Forces Band was established in 2000 as a direct successor to the Band of the 4th Infantry Regiment of Pleven, which has a more than 120 years of history. On 28 February 1884, Franz Minarick was appointed as the bandmaster of the newly formed Navy band. The air force band was created on 1 October 2000 (Bulgarian Music Day) from the Tactical Aviation Corps Band and the Plovdiv Garrison Brass Band.

=== Cyprus ===
==== Republic of Cyprus ====
The Military Music Department of the Cypriot National Guard is the official music band in the Republic of Cyprus. It is based on Greek and British military traditions. The National Guard Band was founded in 1968 and its staff comes from conscript musicians performing their service term within the Guard.

==== Northern Cyprus ====
The modern day Security Forces Command Band of the Turkish Republic of Northern Cyprus is based in primarily Turkish influences. It dates back to British rule over the island, when Captain Zeki Taner established the foundations for a Mujahideen Band to be formed in 1958 from makeshift tools. In 1960, when the Republic of Cyprus was declared, the guarantor country Turkish government sent instruments to the island that the Mujahideen Band needed through Cyprus Turkish Forces Regiment. In 1971, the Mujahideen Band took the name of the Cyprus Turkish Police Band, performing at many concerts under the name of "Student Band" due to the problems faced while crossing to the other districts. When Turkish Cypriots gained an independent state with the Turkish invasion of Cyprus, Security Forces Command was established on 1 August 1976 and the Police Band took the name of the Security Forces Command Band.

=== Czech Republic ===
The Czech Army Central Band is the primary unit of the Czech Land Forces responsible for providing musical support to the Army of the Czech Republic and the Armed Forces of the Czech Republic. The band is currently based in Prague where it fall under the Army Music Service of the Czech Armed Forces, which heads all bands in the CAF. There are two other bands in the CAF: Military Band Olomouc, Military Band Plzeň, Military Band Brno, Military Band Tábor and Military Band Hradec Králové. The latter descends from the former Band of the Czechoslovak Air Force (founded in 1949) and has since 1963 been working mainly in the East Bohemian Region. Many graduates of these bands come from the Prague Military Music School. Primarily, the band tradition in the republic stems from the Austro-Hungarian tradition, with latter influences from the United Kingdom and Russia. On 11 December 1918, it was decided to establish the first military band in the larger garrison towns.

=== Denmark ===
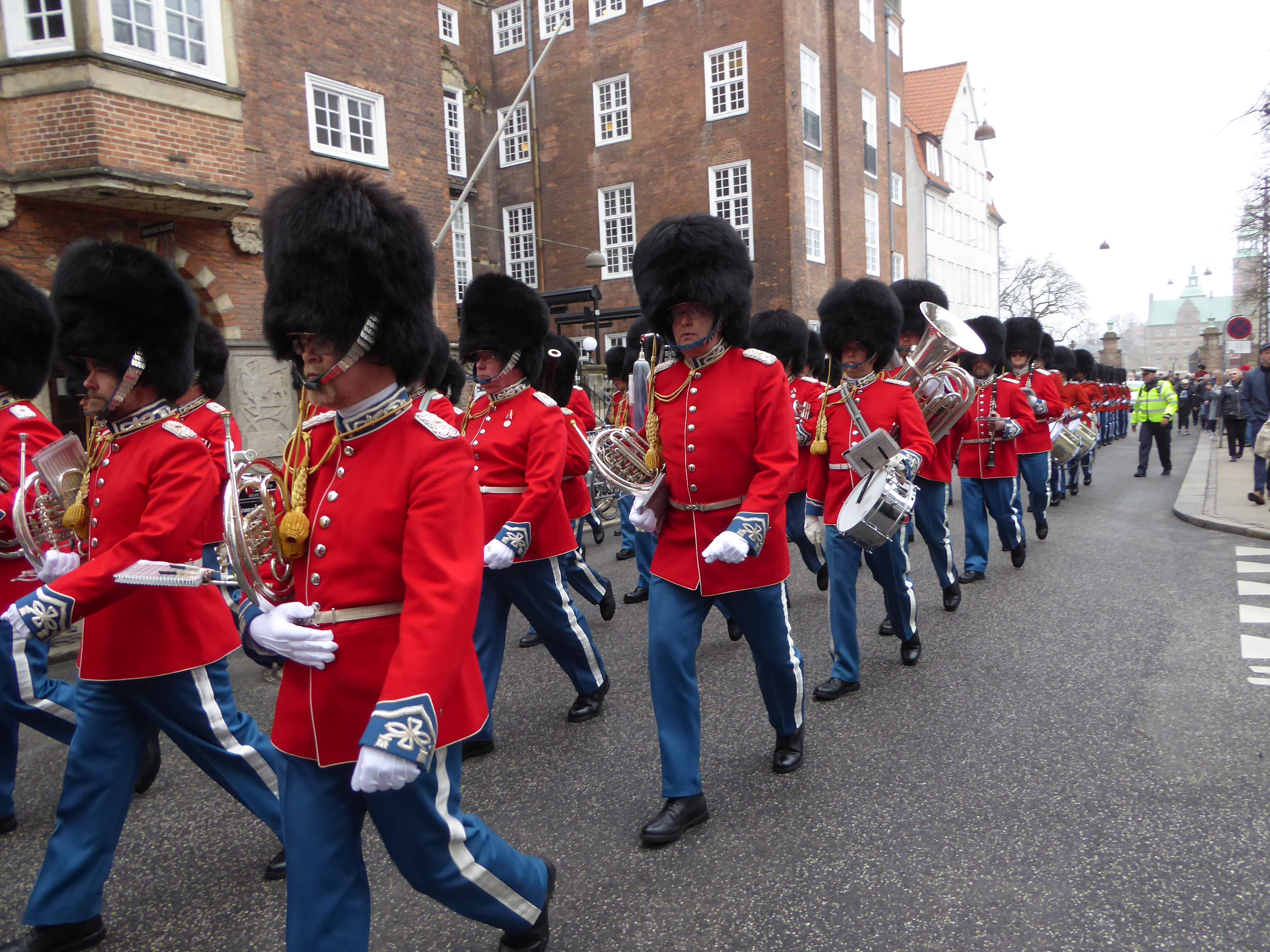
The Royal Life Guards Music Band, the seniormost military band in Danish Defence.

Danish military bands are known to have been influenced greatly by the traditional German and Swedish examples that it often surrounded itself with. The Royal Life Guards Music Band is the seniormost military band in the Danish Defence, performing at all national events, especially ones involving the Monarchy of Denmark, the Danish royal family and foreign dignitaries. The squad-sized Mounted band of the Guard Hussar Regiment Mounted Squadron, which consists of one Timpani and nine bugles, is the only mounted military band in the country and is used during processions and ceremonial escorts.

The Royal Danish Naval Academy sports the navy's only military band, the Royal Danish Navy Band (Danish: Søværnets Tamburkorps), established in 1964 and composed of 24 cadets. The army also maintains several regimental and battalion bands such as the Slesvigske musikkorps, which are stationed at their home barracks.

=== Finland ===
Band formations in Finland have been heavily influenced by Russian, German and Swedish military traditions. Finnish military music has an over 400-year history which began in 1544 when King Gustav I of Sweden promoted the strengthening of musical structure in the Swedish-Finnish army. The first Finnish military bands were composed of pipers, drummers, cavalry buglers and kettle drummers who began to serve on the front lines in the Russo-Swedish War (1554–1557). Gustav's son, John III, settled at Turku Castle after his father's death, and created his own personal court band, whose first directors were the Dutch-born Jören van Heiden and Blasius Fischer. This provided the basis for modern military bands in Finland.

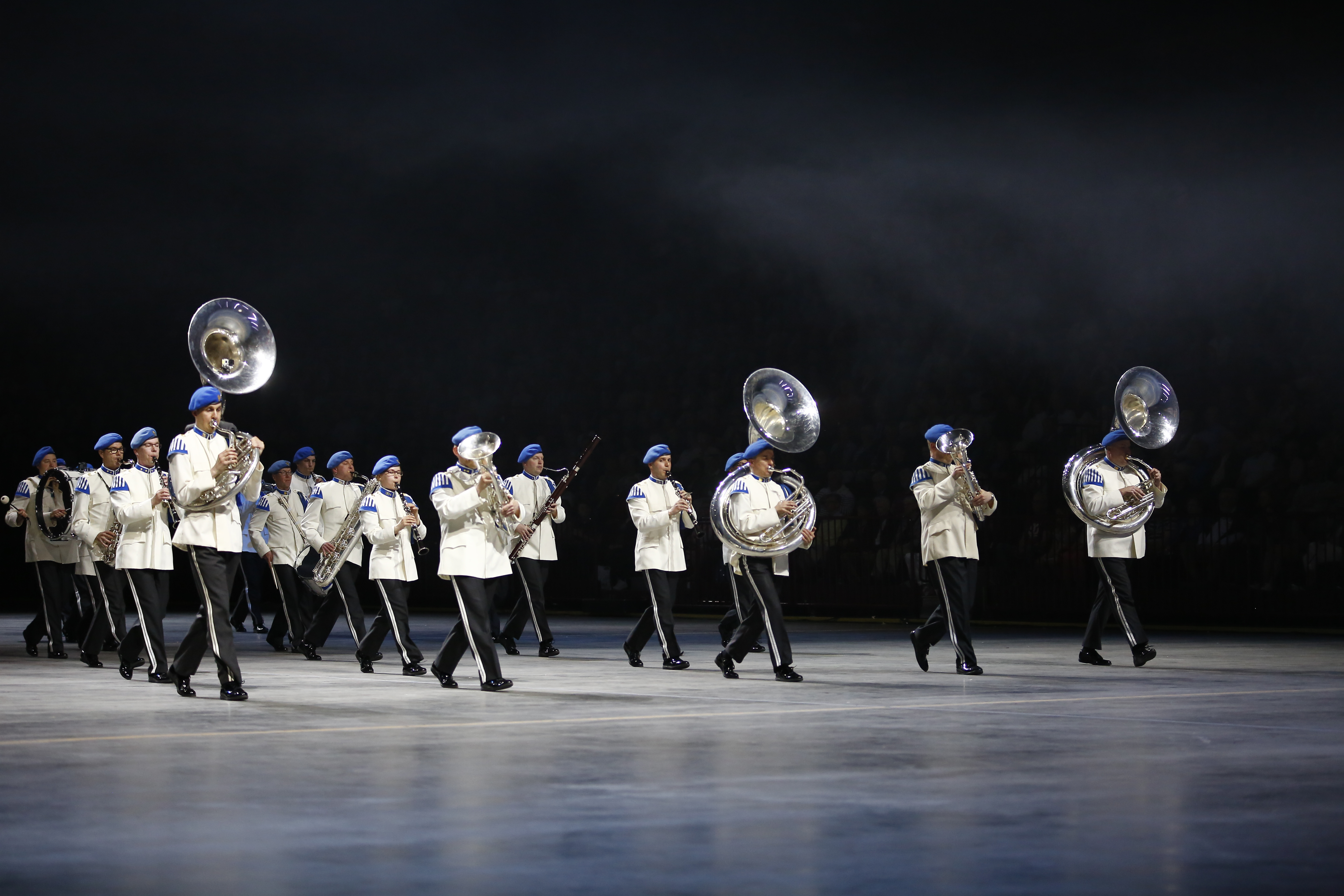
Members of the Kaartin soittokunta of the Finnish Armed Forces, perform at the Sweden International Tattoo.

In the 1600s, a four-member band was added to the ranks of an army regiment on the basis of the Hautboist model in Europe. In the early 1700s, there was a period of repression of Finnish military music, which would only improve later on in the century. In the early 1800s, the last band to be founded in Swedish Finland was the Band of the Queen Dowager's Life Guard Regiment in Pomerania. Bernhard Henrik Crusell, who was a musician in the and an internationally known Swedish instrumentalist, is known as the "Father of Finnish military music" and has "Crusell's March", named in his honor.

In the period of the Grand Duchy of Finland, a total of 23 military bands were in service, growing to 28 from 1812 to 1905. During this time, bands such as the Cavalry Band of the Dragoons Regiment and the Guards Band were founded. Army bands in independent Finland received their initial training at Korsholma Military Music School (now the Military Music School) near Vaasa. The Finnish Defence Forces sports 6 professional military bands with 180 musicians combined. The six professional Finnish military bands are the Kaartin Soittokunta, the Conscript Band of the Finnish Defence Forces, the Finnish Air Force Band, Finnish Navy Band, the Lapland Military Band, and the Dragoon Band. Lapland Military Band from Rovaniemi is the only professional wind orchestra in Northern Finland and is the northernmost military band in the European Union.

The Finnish Armed Forces also hosts and participates in the biannual Hamina Tattoo.

=== France ===
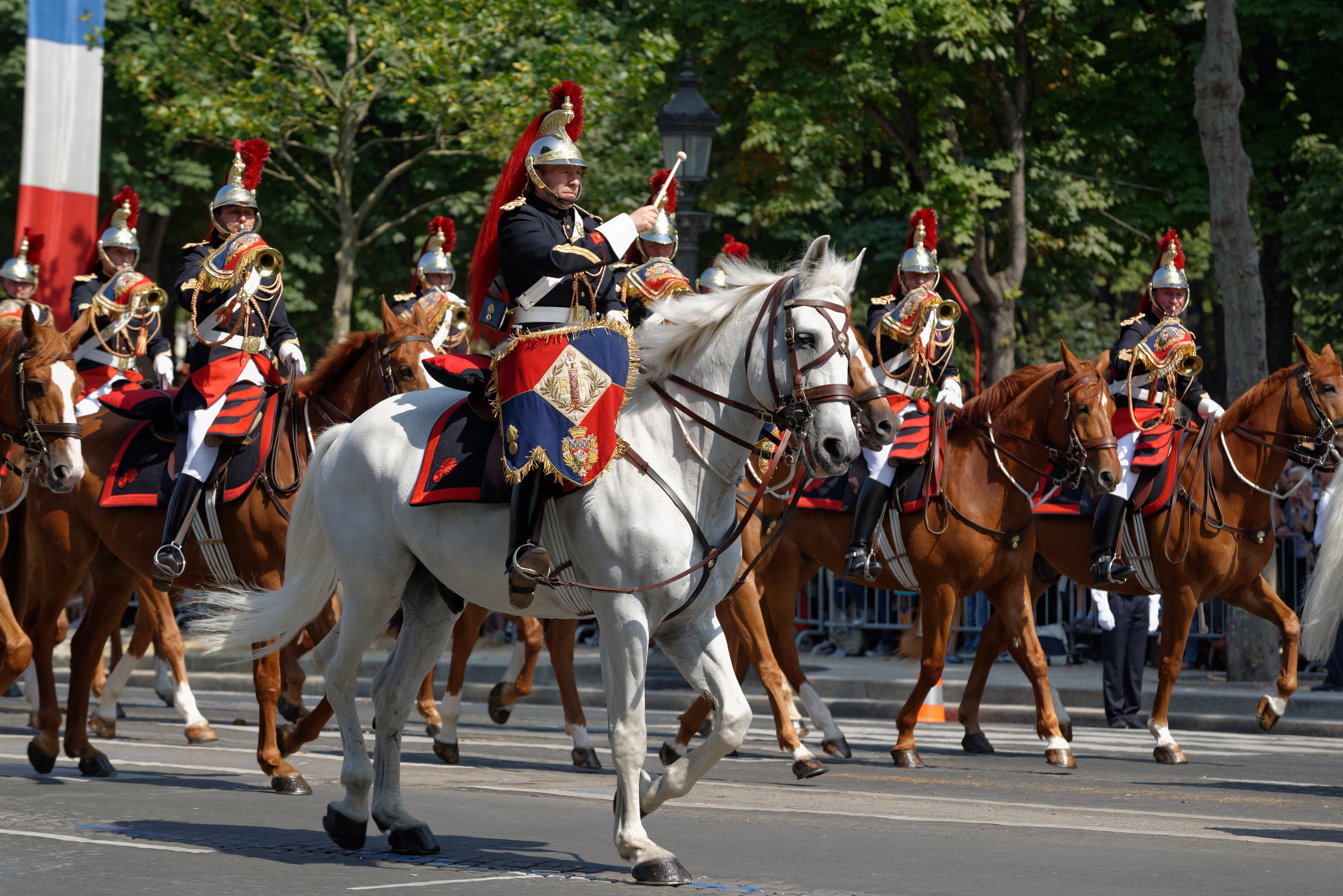
Mounted members of the French Republican Guard Band, a fanfare band during Bastille Day in 2013.

Since the 17th century, France has sported one of the oldest military band traditions in all of Western Europe, providing the Western world with a collection of French marches composed by eminent composers from the Ancien Régime, the Revolution, the Napoleonic era up to the present. The French Revolution brought many changes to music and military bands. As a result of the increase of musicians, military bands grew to sizes never seen before. The French National Guard had 45 musicians in 1789 and expanded to 70 in 1790. The band dissolved in 1792 but became the nucleus for the Paris Conservatory of Music. In 1827, all French bands were cut to 27 players at minimum due to economic reasons. While modern instrumentation somewhat mirrors those of British and American military bands, it is based on uniquely French military music traditions. These bands are led by a conductor and a drum major.

There are four types of military bands today in France: military marching bands (subdivided into marching and mounted brass bands), Corps of Drums (only in the Foreign Legion), Fanfare bands (attached to the marching band or as separate marching bands) and Pipe bands (more known in Brittany as the Bagad). Examples of these are the Marching, Fanfare, and Mounted Bands of the French Republican Guard, and the Central Band of the Foreign Legion, the only remaining French military band to use the fife. The French Army Cavalry and Armored Branch maintain mounted and dismounted fanfare bands featuring cavalry trumpets and bugles plus kettledrums and marching percussion. Another example is the band of the French Chasseurs Alpins (the band of the 27th Mountain Infantry Brigade (France)), which uses the Alphorns in displays. French Armed Forces bands are also of the headquarters element from the regimental or brigade level onward and can also provide musical elements for civil and military events. These bands are distinguished by their service dress uniforms. All army bands are part of the Army Music Command (CMAT). Outside of this framework, army bands include the Fanfare Bands of the 9th Marine Infantry Brigade and the 6th Engineer Regiment.

=== Germany ===
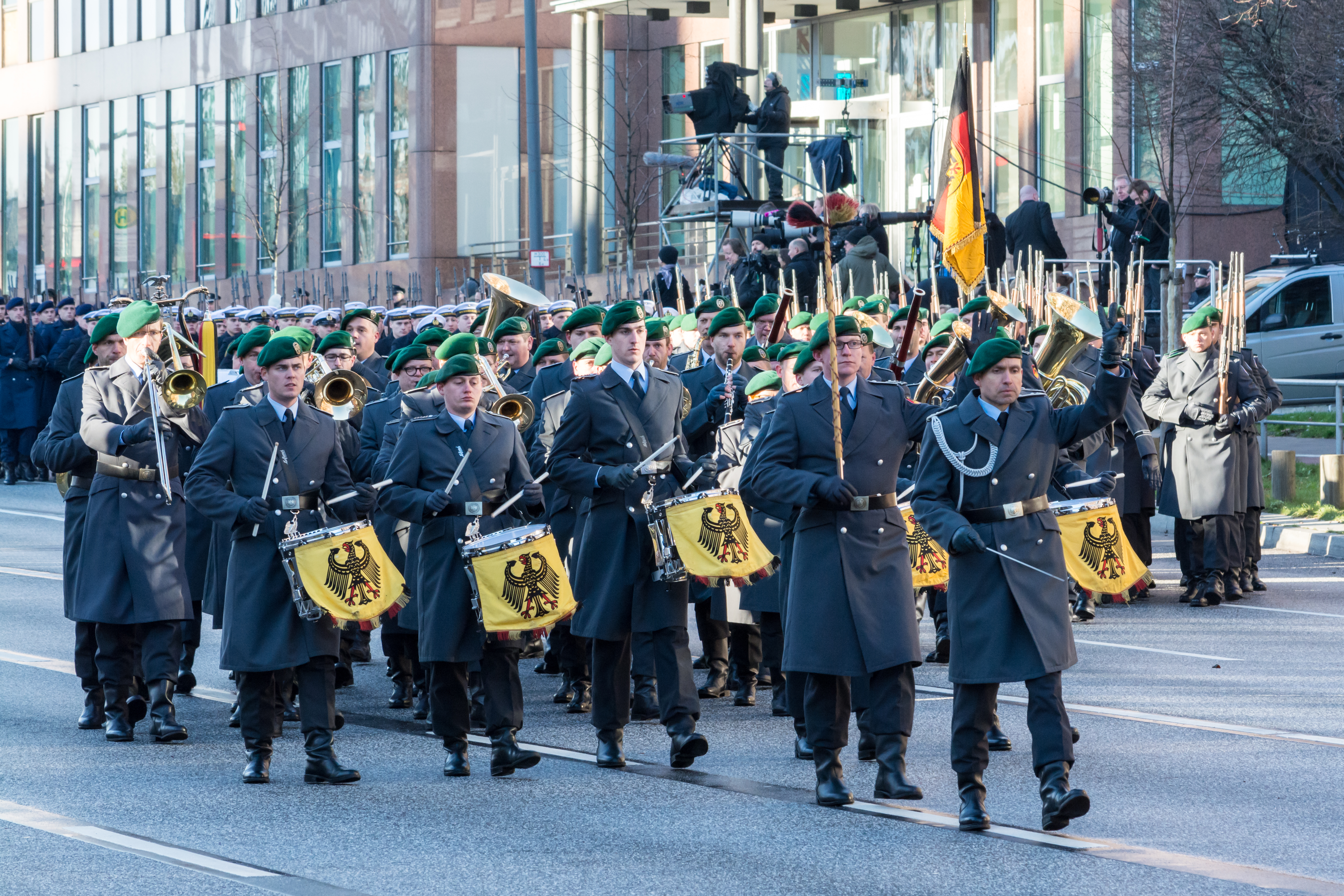
The Staff Band of the Bundeswehr during the funeral of German Chancellor Helmut Schmidt.

The military bands of Germany have two or more components depending on instrumentation. Military bands in Germany's Bundeswehr today are only composed of a military band and a Corps of Drums. Another distinguishing features are the presence of the Turkish crescent in the military bands when they are on parade and the band's conductor being assisted by a Drum major, as well as the inclusion of fanfare trumpeters. The military bands of Germany have also influenced the development of military bands throughout South America.

In types of ensemble, these bands are called as:

- Corps of Drums (Spielmannszug, Tambourkorps, Trommlerkorps)
- Military/Music/Marching Band (Musikkorps, Musikkapelle, Orchester)
- Drum and bugle corps (Bläserkorps)
- Brass bands (Blasorchester, Blaskapelle)
- Fanfare bands (Fanfarenzug, Fanfarenkorps)
- Mounted bands (Trompeterkorps, Kavalleriemusik, Kavallerieorchester, Fanfarenkavalleriekorps)

The bands of the Bundeswehr today are mainly composed of the band proper, Corps of Drums, and the occasional fanfare section, several bands have historical sections wearing period uniforms and playing either modern or classic instruments. Other such bands are led by Drum Majors, Conductors/Directors of Music, and Bugle Majors in the case of mounted, bugle, and fanfare bands.

During the Imperial era, such bands existed all over the German Empire, and later on during the Weimar Republic and the Third Reich (but the mounted bands were reduced to only a few by that time). The Wehrmacht and the Waffen-SS had maintained a considerable amount of military bands in its ranks. The SS-Verfügungstruppe and the Allgemeine SS had also maintained bands, giving way for the SS lead the way for German musical units in Nazi Germany to be part of this paramilitary organization. By 1934, a musical unit had been set up in the 1st SS Panzer Division Leibstandarte SS Adolf Hitler, which was Germany's most senior military band in the pre-war years. Professor Hans Felix Husadel, who was the Luftwaffenmusikinspizient of air force bands, was primarily responsible for the 1930s reorganization of bands in the Luftwaffe, which was notable in its inclusion of the saxophone in 1935.

East Germany's official band service was the Military Music Service of the National People's Army (Nationale Volksarmee), organized into the same ensembles as in the Bundeswehr, as well as added ensembles based on Soviet influence.

=== Greece ===
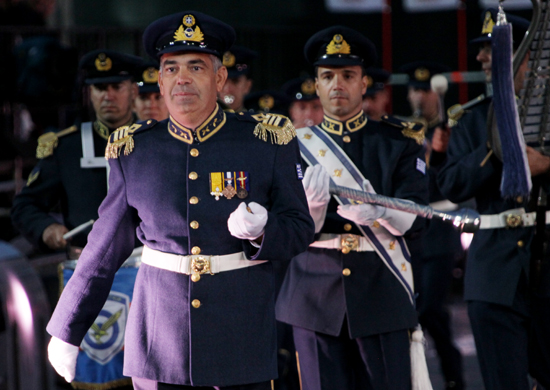
The Hellenic Air Force Band during the 2011 International Military Music Festival at Spasskaya Tower

Greek military bands have a long history that goes back since the country's establishment in the early 19th century. When the Hellenic Army's regular force was under the command of French Colonel Charles Fabvier, army culture was expanded into different areas, including the establishment of military music detachments for the first time. The Hellenic Armed Forces operates three musical units, including the Military Band of Athens, the Hellenic Air Force Band, and the Hellenic Naval Band

The Military Band of Athens, which is the seniormost military band in the army and the armed forces, has an over 190-year history. The band in its current form was established in 1856, and was the only professional musical band of the Greek State. All three bands partake in rendering honors and performing in military parades and concerts. Like the British Army, the Greek military also maintains unit bands at the regimental/brigade level to provide ceremonial support to these specific units.

=== Hungary ===
With the Hungarian Defense Forces Central Military Band (HDF Band) (Magyar Honvédség Központi Zenekar) being the official military band of the Hungarian Defence Forces, it represents the HDF on every occasion, including parades as well as ceremonies and has done this since its foundation in 1962. Military bands in Hungary have an over 120-year history dating back to the founding of the first military band in the capital of Budapest in the late 1890s. The central band also acts as the headquarters for all separate garrison bands.

=== Italy ===
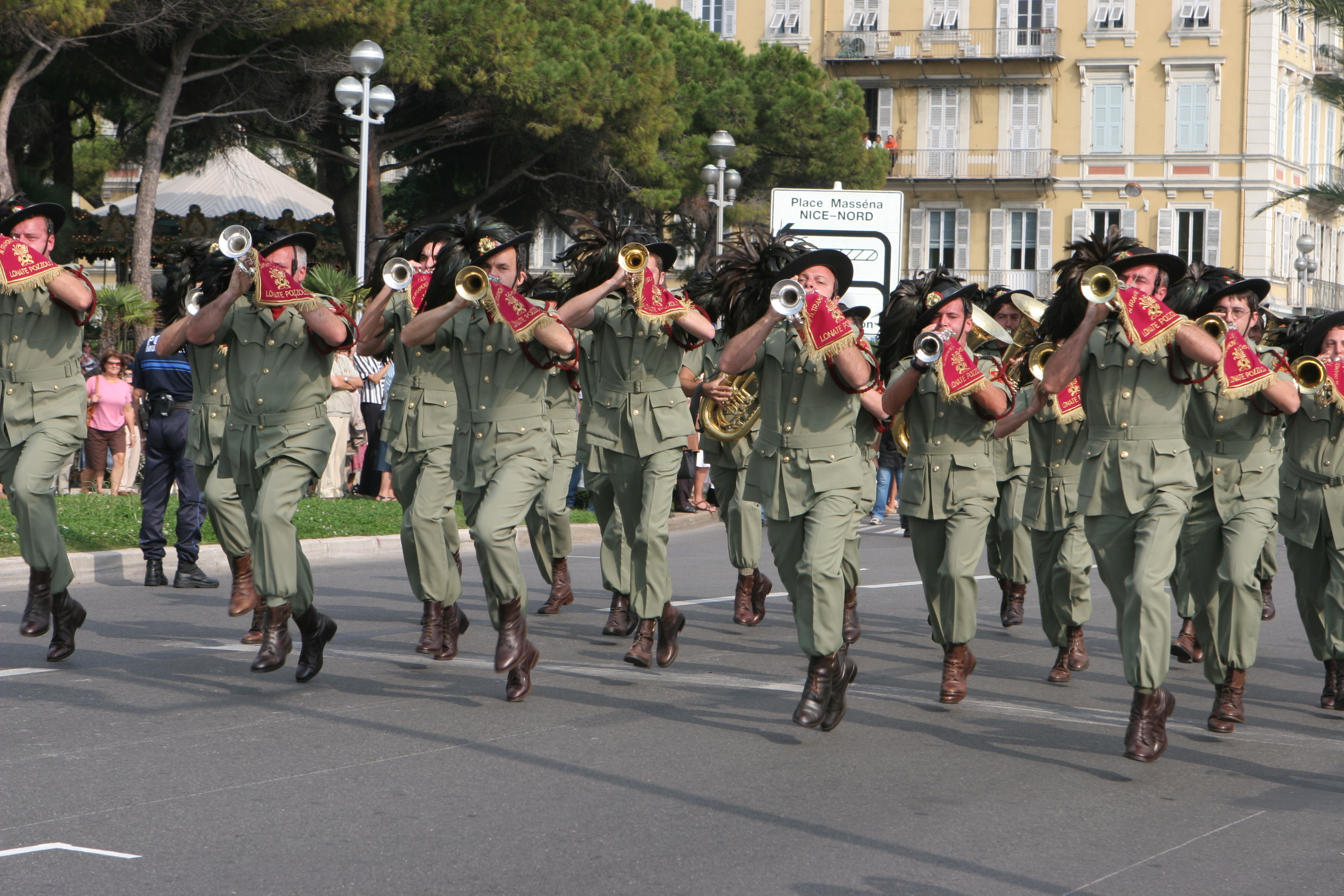
An Italian Bersaglieri fanfare band. As they lack percussion instruments, the band marches at a jogging pace.

Italy has a long tradition of military music. Today, within the Italian Armed Forces, Italian military bands (called in the Italian language as both either banda or fanfara) have an instrumentation order similar to British, French, and American military bands, although it retains the Italian musical flavor and heritage.

Mounted bands in the Italian Army, Carabineri and the Polizia di Stato formerly used only the bugle and the natural trumpet from the 16th century, up to the middle of the 20th century, from the late 19th century to now also they use brass, woodwinds, timpani, single tenor drums, snare drums, cymbals and glockenspiels.

Brass bands belonging to the Bersaglieri have no percussion and march on the jogging pace of their attached units on the lead.

The following bands serve the servicemen and women of the Armed Forces:

- Italian Carabinieri Bands
  - National Carabinieri Band
  - Mounted Carabinieri Regiment Band
  - Band of the Carabinieri NCO School Rome
  - Band of the Carabineri Basic School Turin
  - Band of the Warrant Officers' School (Florence)
  - Band of the "Lombardy" Battalion (Milan)
  - Band of the "Campania" Battalion (Naples)
  - Band of the "Sicily" Battalion (Palermo)
- Italian Army Bands
  - Italian Army Band Rome
  - Alpine Brigade "Taurinense" Band
  - Alpine Brigade "Julia" Band
  - Bersaglieri Brigade "Garibaldi"
  - Cavalry Brigade "Pozzuolo del Friuli" Band
  - Mechanized Brigade "Aosta" Band
  - Mechanized Brigade "Pinerolo" Band
  - Mechanized Brigade "Sassari" Band
  - Anti-aircraft Artillery Command Band
  - 1st Regiment "Granatieri di Sardegna" Band
  - 7th Bersaglieri Regiment Band
- Guardia di Finanza Bands
  - Central Band
  - Academy Band
- Italian Air Force Bands
  - Central Band
  - Air Force Academy Band
- Italian Navy Bands
  - Central Band
  - Band of the San Marco Marine Brigade
  - Band of the Corps of the Port Captaincies
  - Naval Academy Band

A military band was maintained in the former National Republican Guard.

=== Latvia ===
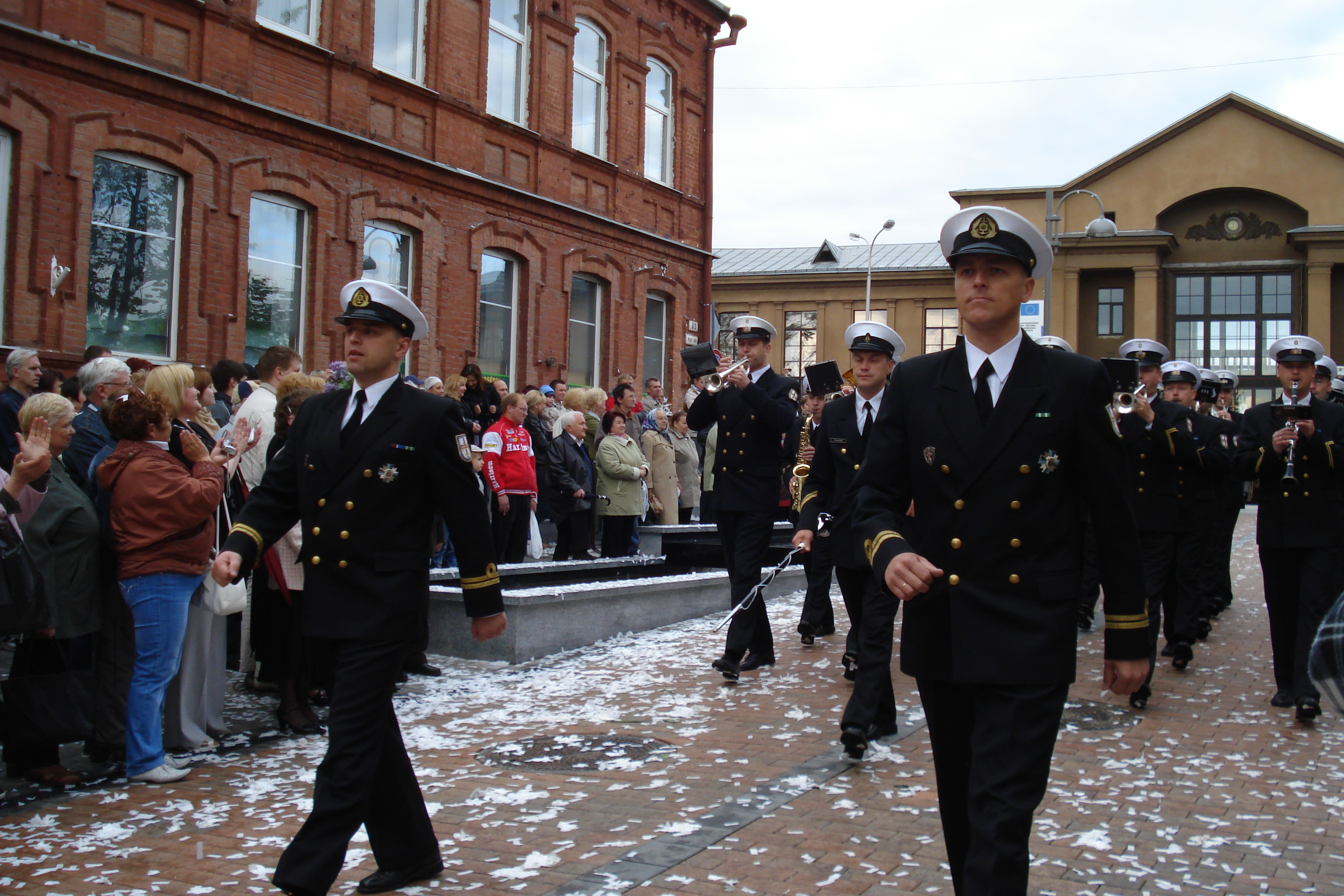
The Latvian National Armed Forces maintain a number of military bands, such as the Central Band of the Latvian Navy.

Latvia developed a tradition of having military bands right after it gained its independence from the Russian Empire in 1918. In February 1919, Captain Ludvigs Bolšteins of the newly formed Latvian Army ordered an infantry company to form a band composed of 11 volunteers in what was considered to be the first military band in independent Latvia. Beginning in 1940 and again following the end of the German occupation in 1944–45, the Red Army began stationing army bands on its territory. As the Soviet band tradition grew and progressed over the years, bands of the Baltic Military District stationed in the Latvian SSR were aligned towards the standard of the Bands of the Moscow Military District. Since 1991, the Central Military Band of the Latvian National Armed Forces (also known as the NAF Staff Band) has been the flagship ensemble of the national armed forces and has participated in every protocol events. Officially coming under the command of the Latvian National Armed Forces Staff Battalion, it mostly performs in the presence of a major public figure, such as the President of Latvia.

In addition to the Central Band of the Armed Forces, three other military bands are also associated with the NAF Staff Band and are on the National Armed Forces National Orchestral Board: They include the Central Band of the Latvian Land Forces, based in Daugavpils and mostly provides music for the Latgale; Central Band of the Latvian Navy, based in Liepāja; and the Central Band of the Latvian National Guard.

The Central Band of the Latvian National Guard is the newest band established by the Latvian Armed Forces. However, although it was officially founded in 2011, it actually succeeded a military band that was under the supervision of the National Guard and was active in the 1990s. At the time, it was simply under the command of an Ordnance Battalion of the National Armed Forces. At present, the National Guard Band sports a saxophone quartet, jazz ensemble, a choir, and a big band, which combined totals up to 40 musicians. The current conductor of the National Guard Band is Captain Andis Karelis and Major Viesturs Lazdins.

=== Luxembourg ===
The Musique militaire grand-ducale is the sole military band of the small country of Luxembourg, based in Conservatoire de Luxembourg. The band performs close to 50 concerts per year, mostly in Luxembourg City. The band is divided into a chamber orchestra, brass band, bugles and drums, an instrumental ensemble, as well as several quintets.

=== Netherlands ===
The Netherlands Armed Forces's military music component is made up of eight military bands and two field music formations, which perform ceremonial duties and give concerts to the public, these bands are a hybrid of the German, British, Spanish and French band traditions. The Royal Military Band "Johan Willem Friso" is the main military band of the Netherlands, serving as the seniormost band of the entire armed forces. The band was formed in 1995 as a fusion of both the Royal Military Band of the Grenadier Guards Regiment, elements of the Brass Band of the Rifle Guards Regiment and the Band of the Johan Willem Friso Regiment and thus is the largest and oldest among all the bands. The other four bands are the National Reserve Korps Fanfare Orchestra, the Brass Band of the Royal Netherlands Army Regiment of Engineers, the Fanfare Orchestra of the RNA and Mounted Fanfare Band Section and the Garderegiment Grenadiers en Jagers Brass Band. All five report to Headquarters, Royal Netherlands Army.

A video of the bands of the Dutch Army

The Royal Netherlands Navy is served by the Rotterdam Marine Band of the Royal Netherlands Navy, the Royal Netherlands Air Force by the Central Band of the Royal Netherlands Air Force and the Veterans' Brass Band of the Royal Netherlands Air Force and the Royal Marechaussee by the Fanfare Band of the Royal Marechaussee.

Of the many field music formations in active service during the Cold War only the Fanfare Band of the Royal Marechaussee's Traditional Drum and Bugle Corps is in service, together with the Royal Netherlands Air Force Traditional Drum and Bugle Corps, the eight bands currently active were only a few of the many bands that existed for public and ceremonial activities from the 19th century up to the 1990s in the Armed Forces.

Former bands and field music formations were:

- Corps of Drums of the Garderegiment Grenadiers
- Fanfare Orchestra of the Rifles' Guards Regiment
- Rifles' Guards Regiment Drum and Bugle Corps
- Band and Corps of Drums of the Garderegiment Fuseliers Prinses Irene
- Band and Corps of Drums of Regiment Van Heutsz
- Band and Drum and Bugle Corps of the Infantry Regiment Oranje Gelderland
- Band and Drums and Bugles of the Limburgse Jagers
- Fleet Forces Band of the Royal Netherlands Navy
- Fanfare Band of the Royal Netherlands Army Cavalry
- Fanfare Band of the Royal Netherlands Army Artillery
- Drum and Bugle Corps of the Logistics Component of the RNA
- Fanfare Orchestra of the Royal Netherlands Army Artillery
- Band and Fanfare Unit of the Royal Netherlands Army Regiment of Engineers
- Band and Fanfare Unit of the Royal Netherlands Army Corps of Signals

=== Norway ===
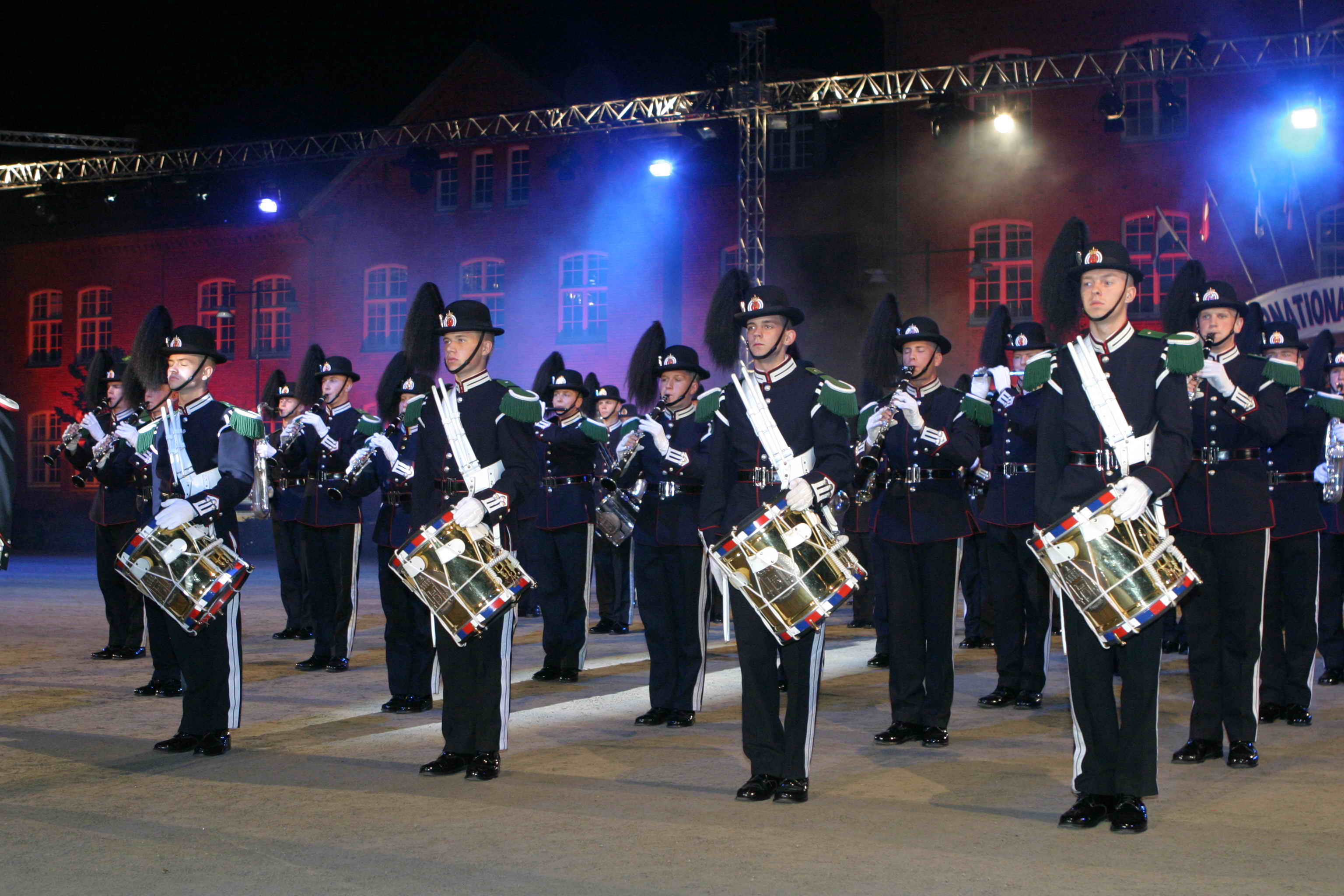
Members of the Norwegian Royal Guards Band and Drill Team Company

The Norwegian Armed Forces have several military bands that play a prominent role during ceremonies and parades. Norwegian bands date back to the 1620s, when platoons of drummers (tambur) were stationed at all military fortresses in the country under the Army. Five brigade bands were established during the restructuring of the Norwegian Armed Forces in 1817. Following World War II, military bands became popular among civilians and government officials, eventually leading to the Norwegian Parliament to give the green light for establishing over six bands in 1953.

The following bands, among others, serve the ceremonial duties of the Norwegian Armed Forces:

- Staff Band of the Norwegian Armed Forces
- Royal Norwegian Navy Band
- Norwegian Air Force Band
- Hans Majestet Kongens Garde Band and Drill Team Company
- Norwegian Army Band, Northern Norway
- Norwegian Army Band, Western Norway (also known as the Norwegian Armed Forces Band)
- Oslo Home Guard Band

=== Poland ===
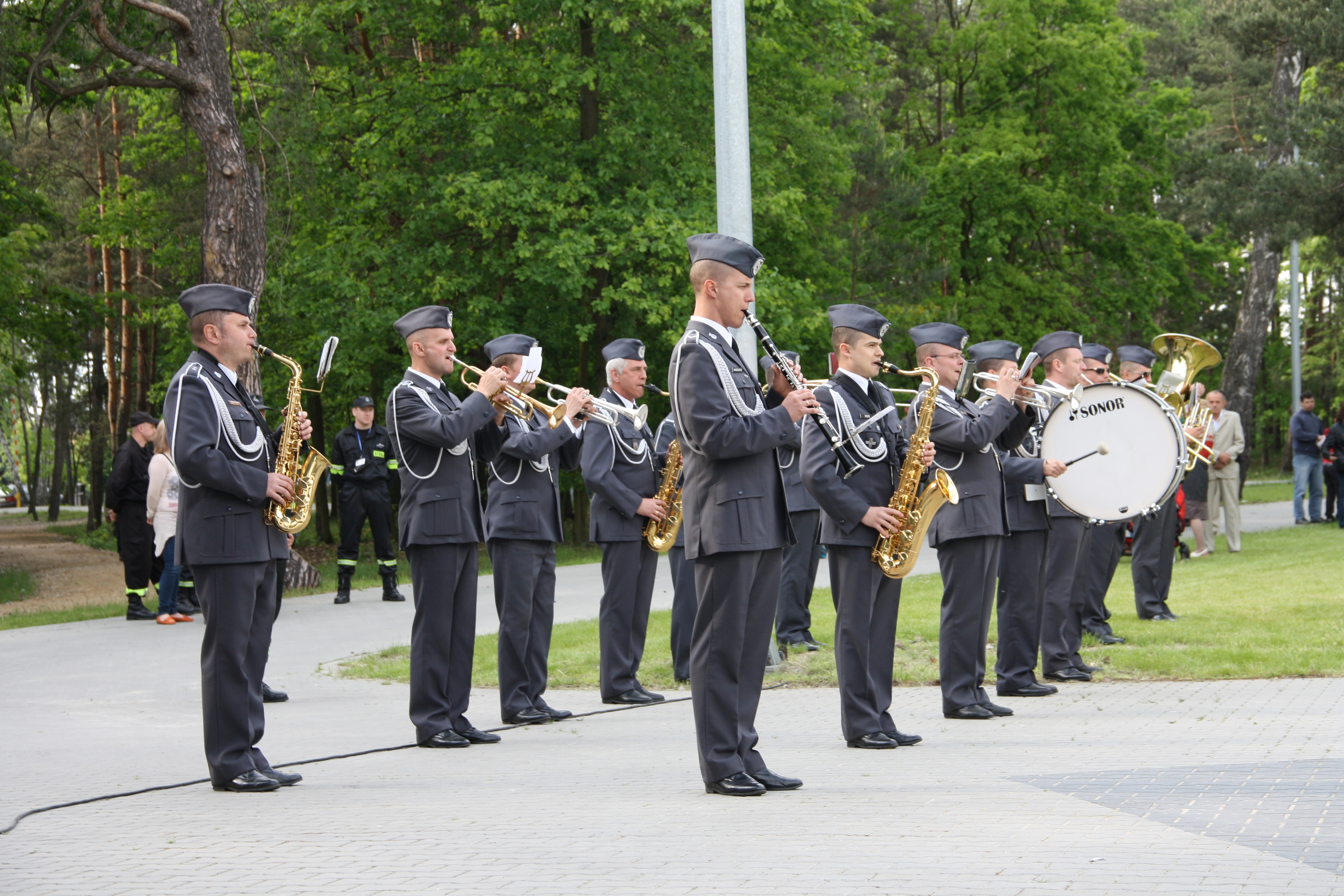
The Representative Band of the Polish Air Force was established in 2002, merging two military bands from Jelenia Góra and Oleśnica.

Polish Armed Forces military bands follow the Austrian model, but follow also the German and Russian band and march music tradition too. The main military band in Poland is the Representative Central Band of the Polish Armed Forces which is part of the 1st Guards Battalion, Representative Honor Guard Regiment and has served the leadership of Poland since 1918. All service branches of the armed forces also have their own military band. The representative ensemble of the armed forces also maintains a full chamber orchestra attached to the unit. In addition to the central band, the three main service branches of the Polish military maintain their own representative bands.

The Representative Band of the Polish Air Force (Orkiestra Reprezentacyjna Polskich Sił Powietrznych) was established in 2002 following the merger of two military bands from Jelenia Góra and Oleśnica. The majority of band members are graduates of the former Military Music High School in Gdańsk, as well as graduates of Music Academies in Poland and abroad. It takes part in numerous festivals and tattoos in Western and Central Europe. In 2009, the Polish Air Force Band was the winner of the 44th annual Polish Armed Forces review of military bands. It is currently based with the 34th Air Defense Missile Squadron in Bytom and is placed under the command of Lieutenant Krystian Siwek.

The Representative Band of the Polish Land Forces (Orkiestra Reprezentacyjna Wojsk Lądowych) supports the everyday ceremonial activities of the Polish Land Forces from its headquarters in Wrocław. It was established in 1952 by order of Vladislav Korchits, who was the then chief of Polish General Staff. In over 50 years, the band was led by acclaimed Polish musicians such as Major Czesław Kęstowicz, Captain Franciszek Minta, and Major Mariusz Dziubek.

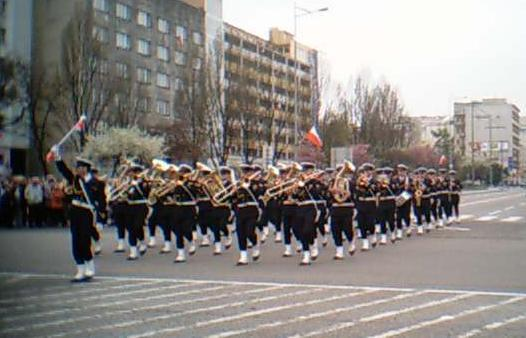
The Representative Band of the Polish Navy has served the musical needs of the Navy since 1920.

The Representative Band of the Navy of Poland (Orkiestra Reprezentacyjna Marynarki Wojennej Rzeczypospolitej Polskiej) serves the ceremonial and musical needs of the Polish Navy. The band was formed in 1920 in the city of Puck, which was the then headquarters of the Polish navy. It was transferred to Gdynia with other units in 1925 and has been based there ever since. Its activities were suspended during World War II due to the occupation of Poland. The Polish government created a Big Band as part of the band in 1982.

The history of the Representative Band of the Polish Border Guard (Orkiestra Reprezentacyjna Straży Granicznej) dates back to 1956 and is closely related to the history of the Carpathian Brigade of the Polish Army. It has performed its current functions as a military band since 1973 and has been based in Podhale since its founding. It is known as a perfect interpreter of symphonic, brass and classical music. The band prides itself on the over 10,000 concerts that it has performed over the years and the several prizes and awards it has been given by musical and government officials in Poland and abroad.

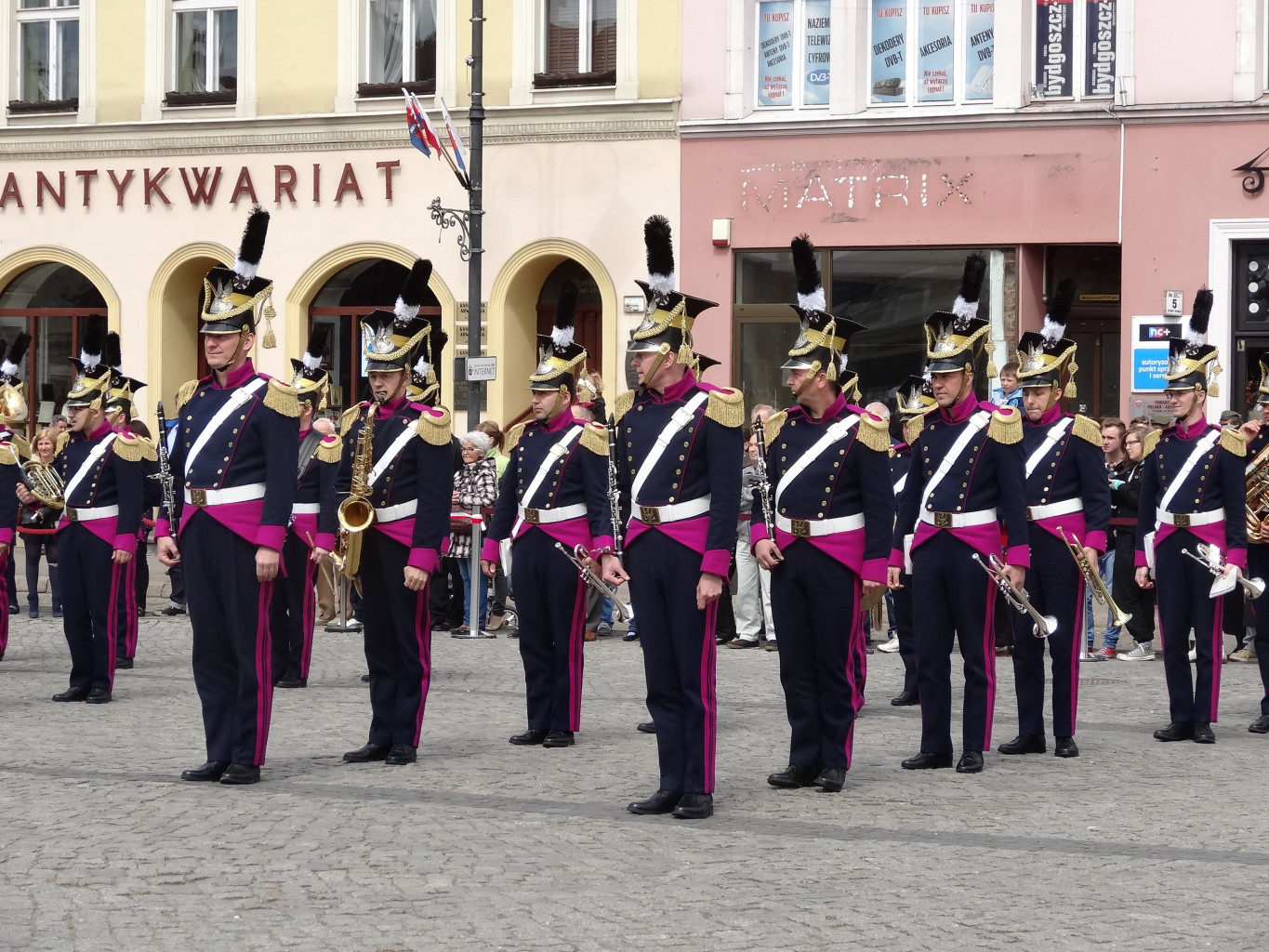
The band of the Bydgoszcz garrison performing on May 3rd Constitution Day, 2014

The following military garrisons have military bands under their jurisdiction:

- Bydgoszcz Garrison Band
- Stargard Garrison Band
- Toruń Garrison Band
- Lublin Garrison Band
- Giżycko Garrison Band
- Elbląg Garrison Band
- Szczecin Garrison Band
- Siedlce Garrison Band
- Żagań Garrison Band
- Świnoujście Garrison Band
- Koszalin Garrison Band
- Bytom Garrison Band
- Dęblin Garrison Band
- Radom Garrison Band
- Warsaw Capital Garrison Band
- Kraków Garrison Band
- Rzeszów Garrison Band

=== Portugal ===
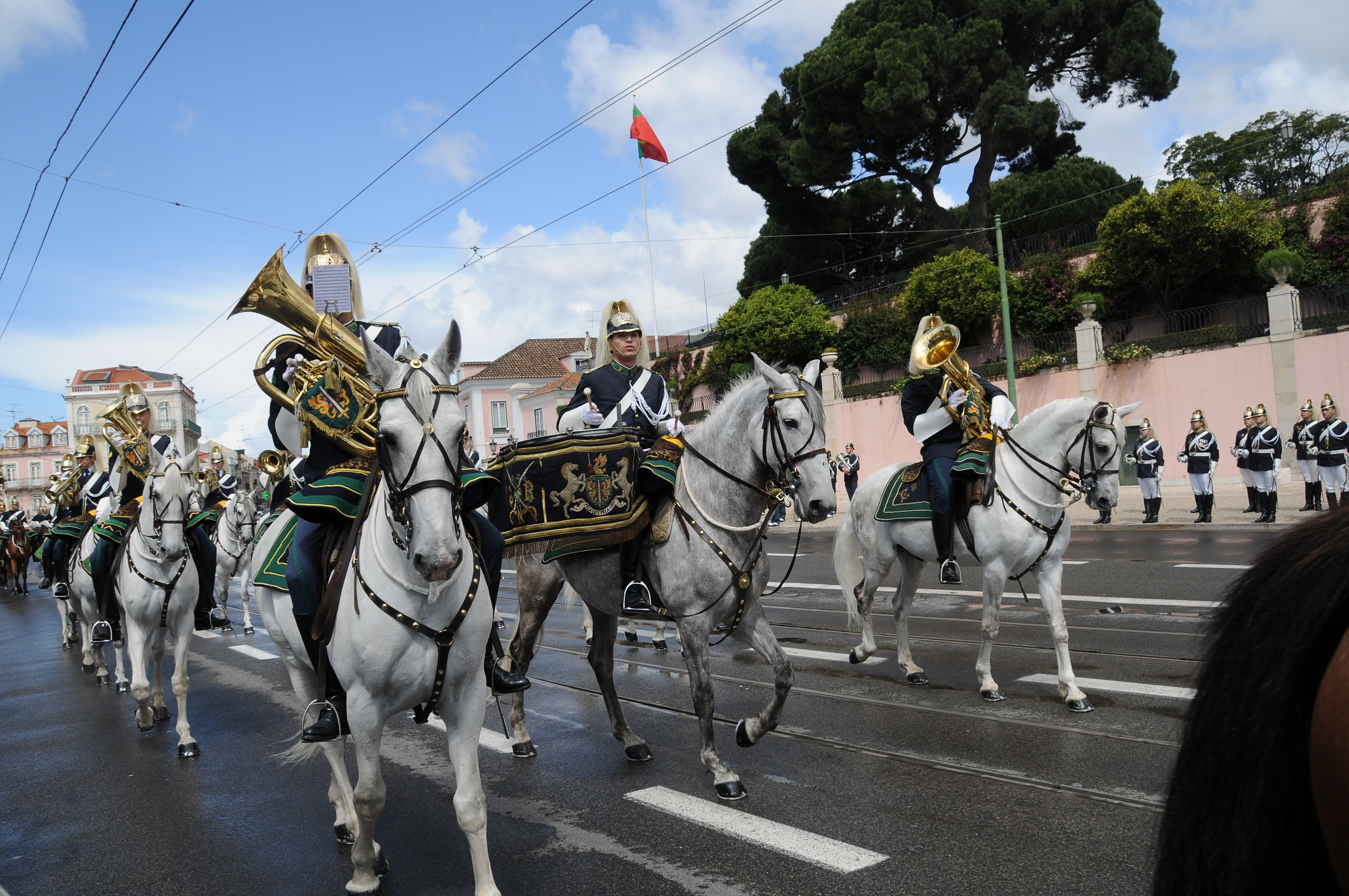
Horse Charanga, the mounted band of the Portuguese National Republican Guard.

Portugal has a long military music tradition. Military type bands exist not only in the Military forces, but also in security and emergency forces, with some influences from Spain, France and the United Kingdom.

The senior band of the Portuguese Armed Forces is the Army Symphonic Band (BSE), based in Lisbon and formed in 1988 by order of the Chief of Staff of the Army, General Mário Firmino Miguel. It is the heir to the oldest musical traditions of the Portuguese Army, historical predecessors of which include the Band of the 1st Infantry Regiment and the Band of the 5th Caçadores Battalion On 7 October 2005, it was awarded by the President Jorge Sampaio the Gold Medal of Distinguished Services. The Army also has four regional military bands, the Army Fanfare Band and three other fanfare bands. The Fanfare Brass Band of the Portuguese Rapid Reaction Brigade has the particularity of including bagpipes and its members being all qualified paratroopers. The youngest of the formations, it has been active since 1986.

The Banda da Armada (Navy Band) is the official band of the Portuguese Navy, dating back the 1740s when there was a band called "Charamela" in the Portuguese Royal Navy. The Navy also includes the Fanfarra da Armada (Fanfare Band of the Navy), a drum and bugle corps which is part of the Portuguese Marine Corps, with origins dating to the Royal Brigade and in existence since 1837. Both carry the long history of bands and field music in this branch.

The Portuguese Air Force Band was created on New Year's Eve in 1957, five years before the founding of the actual air force. Like the army band, it is a recipient of the Gold Medal of Distinguished Services, awarded in 1997.

Outside those bands, all of which are part of the main framework of the Portuguese military, the Symphonic Band of the National Republican Guard (GNR), the country's gendarmerie force, serves as an official military band and serves as the official state band of the republic. The GNR also includes the Horse Brass Band (Charanga a Cavalo), which is the only mounted band in the world which plays while on the gallop.

=== Romania ===
The Military Music Service of the Romanian Armed Forces (Serviciul musical militar al Forțelor Armate Române) and the Military Music Inspectorate (Inspectoratul Muzicilor Militare) are the principal military band departments in Ministry of National Defense of Romania. It is responsible for the organization and instruction of military bands in the armed forces. It is currently housed at a military base on 13 Iuliu Maniu Boulevard, Bucharest. July 1 is considered to be the "Day of Military Music" (Ziua muzicilor militare), which is observed as a professional holiday.

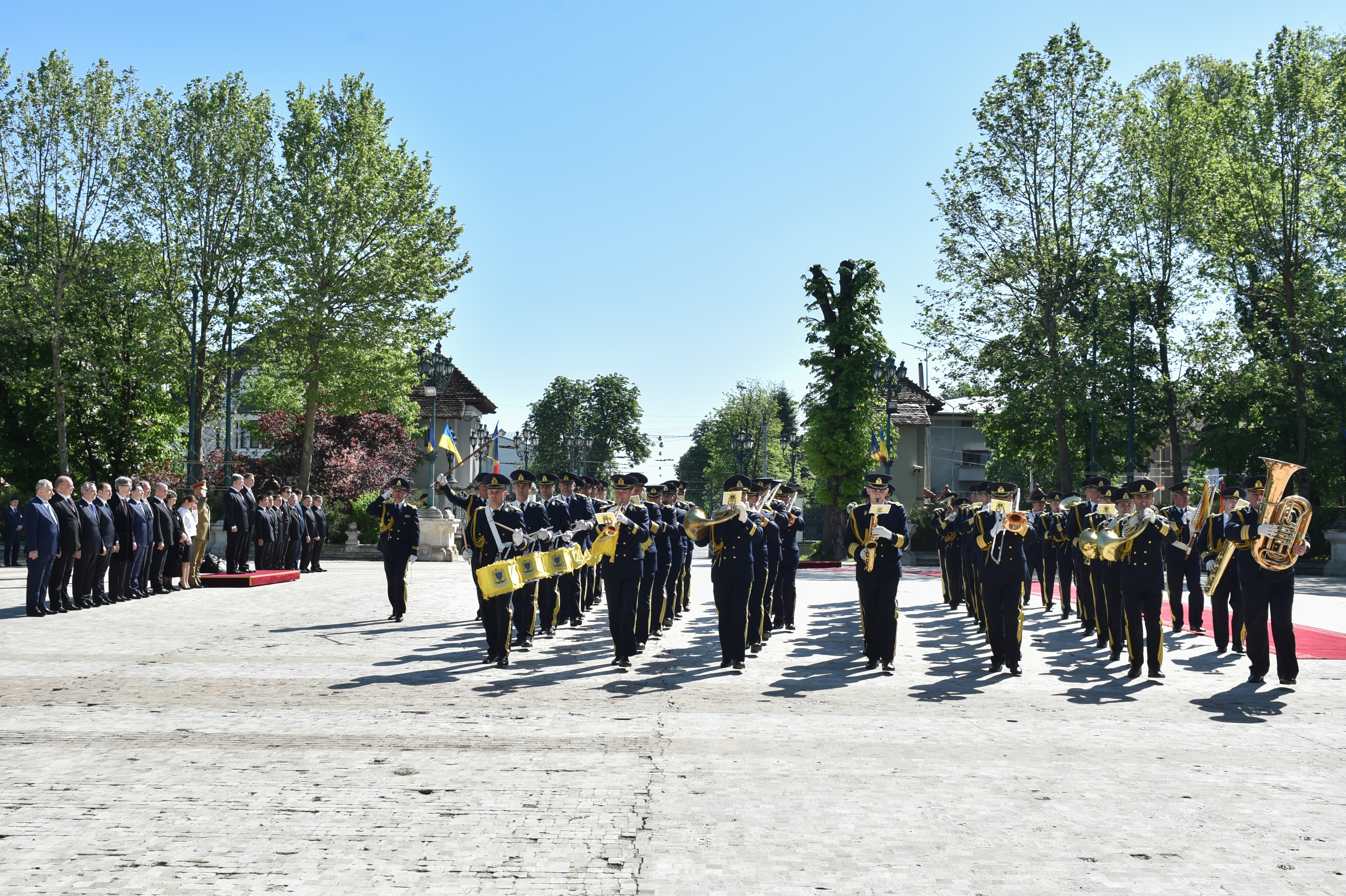
The regimental band for the Michael the Brave 30th Guards Brigade during the visit of Petro Poroshenko to Romania.

In 1864, it became a special section in the Ministry of War, which controlled its subordinate military bands and music schools. The section became the basis for the subsequent establishment of the Military Music Inspectorate in 1867, which had Captain Eduard Hübsch being the first commander. In the nearly 30 years since Hübsch was the inspector of the military music, the special regulations for the bands of the band were elaborated and the military musicians were given a new status in the army. On May 26, 1895, inspector general Ion Ivanovici (the author of the most famous Romanian waltzes Waves of the Danube) endowed the inspectorate with new instruments, introduced a valuable and diverse repertoire, while supporting the training of future military instrumentalists. On October 10, 1936, the Military Music School was established and was designed to ensure the training military music staff. In the middle of June in 1954, the representative military bands of each service branch of the Romanian People's Army were formed. The current inspector general of the military music service is Colonel Valentin Neacsu, who has served in this position since October 11, 2007, succeeding Colonel Ionel Croitoru.

The Romanian Armed Forces maintains a central band for its respective service branches. They include the Representative Central Band of the Romanian Army, the Representative Central Band of the Romanian Air Force, and the Representative Central Band of the Romanian Navy. In addition to centralized bands, the Romanian Armed Forces also maintains several other bands, which include the Regimental Band of the Michael the Brave 30th Guards Brigade, the Doina Armatei Folk Band, and the bands for the Military Training Center for Music, and the Military Music School. All the bands follow a mix of the Russian, French, British and German traditions with field snare drums on the front rank occasionally when in massed bands formation, during the period of the Socialist Republic of Romania a typical massed bands formation on national holidays in Bucharest (until 1989) sported bugles and chromatic fanfare trumpets following the Russian practice at the front rank in front of the percussion.

=== Russia ===
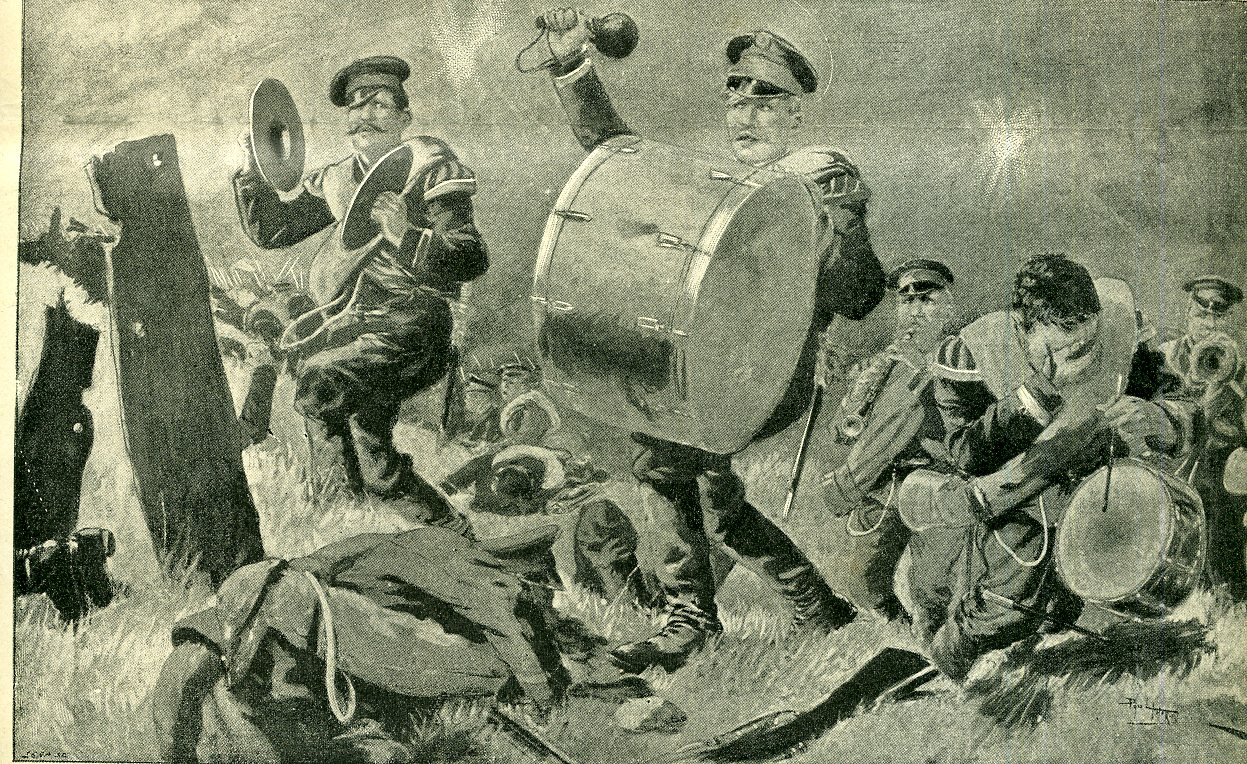
Depiction of a military band of the Imperial Russian Army during the Russo-Japanese War

Starting in the late 17th century with the birth of the regular Russian armed services, each unit of the Imperial army and navy formed their own bands using regular enlisted personnel and NCOs and led by officers as directors of music and bandmasters. This tradition stayed even in the Soviet era, and one of the finest band conductors of that era was Major General Semyon Tchernetsky, who founded and became the first director of music of the Central Band of the Ministry of Defense of the Soviet Union from 1927 to 1951. Indeed, Russia has a long tradition of military bands and so many military marches have been composed by various composers throughout the years. These bands were modeled after the German military bands, with the addition of the chromatic fanfare trumpet. Some but not all Russian marches then were made in Germany and other locations as the rest were locally composed military marches. They would usually have a conductor, and a drum major using his mace with/or a bugle major playing the chromatic fanfare trumpet. Brass instruments formed the first tier of the formation followed by the percussion and the woodwinds. Mounted cavalry bands were similar to German ones but were different in many aspects.

Military bands (also loosely translated to Военный оркестр, which means Military Orchestra) when massed would add field drums and fanfare trumpets to the ensemble for large parades and state ceremonies. The formation used by these massed bands mirror today's formations.

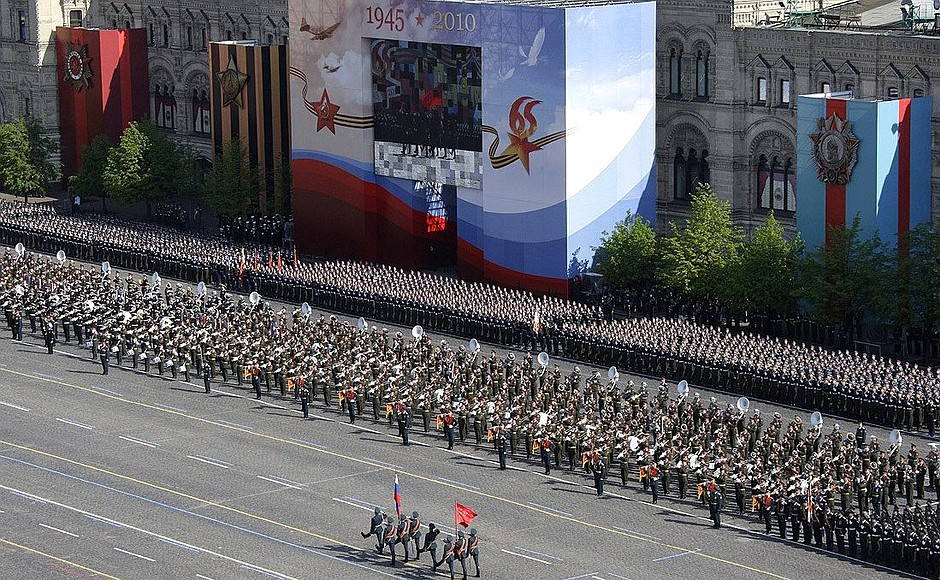
The Moscow Garrison massed bands during the 2010 Moscow Victory Day Parade

By the time that the Soviet Armed Forces came into being in 1918, military bands began to change for the better. With the establishment of the Central Military Band by Semyon Chernetsky in 1927 came the birth of today's Russian and ex-Soviet Union military band culture. In the late 1920s and the 1930s the typical Soviet Massed military bands that perform on May 1, November 7 and from 1945 onward, May 9, would be composed of a Military band and a Corps of Drums marching past and until the 1970s would later join the military band in place.

Soviet massed military bands in the 1930s and 1940s tend to have a drum major, a conductor, and an optional two to three deputy conductors in the front of the band. Mounted bands had the same formation, but with only a director of music and the optionally mounted band drum major, only a few bands sported woodwinds. The Soviet military bands of the pre-war days played not only on May Day and Revolution Day but in the National Sports Day parades at the Red Square, the various sports competitions, and other occasions, and after the Second World War, at Victory Day celebrations across the USSR. In the 1930s, the Turkish crescent holders were shaking during the sports parades, but in the 1940s, they were not shaking them. Their formation mirrored those used by Russian military bands in the Imperial era.

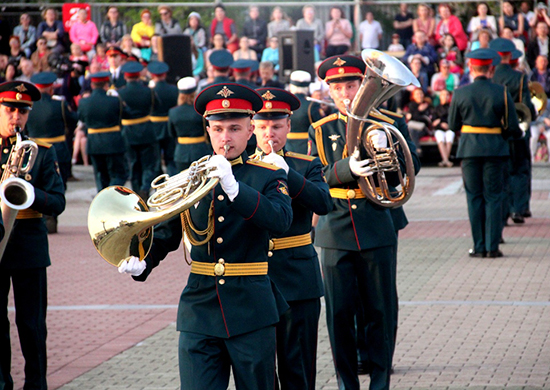
Regional and local garrisons/military districts in Russia also maintain their own musical support services, such as the Military Band of the Eastern Military District.

By the 1950s, Soviet military bands evolved in instrumentation. Their positioning, especially in the Moscow bands, changed for the better as newly composed Soviet military marches soon created the Soviet military band sound common to Westerners during the Cold War days. A conductor and one to four drum majors and several bandmasters led the massed military bands of the Soviet Union in Moscow, Leningrad and republican capital cities into a new decade of progress for Soviet military music as many new compositions entered the song-list of marches played during state parades. The reform of the bands begun in 1948-1949 under the assistant director of the band service, Major General Ivan Petrov, and continued on until the 1970s. Bands from the Moscow Military District took part in the opening and closing ceremonies of the 1980 Summer Olympics, which was the international television debut of Soviet military bands, broadcast to numerous countries around the world.

Today, military bands in the Russian Federation are also of the headquarters element from the regimental level onward, and also provide musical support to the different units of the Armed Forces of the Russian Federation, the Ministry of Internal Affairs, the Federal Protective Service, the Federal Security Service and the Ministry of Emergency Situations. The military bands here also provide musical support in civil and military events, in a wide range of groups and ensembles. Some can even continue the old Russian military band traditions by donning the old imperial military uniforms of the Russian Empire, especially the uniforms of the bands. Examples of such are the Central Band of the Ministry of Defence of the Russian Federation, the Exemplary Band of the Moscow Garrison Guard of Honor, the St. Petersburg Admiralty Band, the Central Band of the Western Military District and the Presidential Band from the Kremlin Regiment.

=== Serbia ===
The first military band in Serbia was founded in 1831 by decree of Prince Miloš Obrenović under the title of Knjaževsko–Serbska Banda. This band served the then-Royal Serbian Army and is the ancestor to the modern Band of the Guard as the official ceremonial band of the Serbian Armed Forces. The Royal Yugoslav Army and the Yugoslav People's Army have also maintained military bands in their ranks throughout the 20th century, with the former having a band in its Royal Guard. There was also a Military School of Music in the early 1900s. Military bands also include the Niš and Binički Bands of the Serbian Army.

All bands follow the Austrian practice with added Russian and Turkish influences.

=== Spain ===
Military bands in Spain are of very long-standing. There are reports of primitive bands dating from the Celtiberian tribal and Roman periods. However military music in the modern sense began with the expansion of the Spanish Empire between the sixteenth and eighteenth centuries, during the numerous Spanish military campaigns in Europe and the wider world when the first bands were formed in the Tercios of the Spanish Army, equipped with fifes and drums and later with wind instruments of the period formed under a drum major. The influence of Spanish military marching bands is very important, especially in Latin America and the Philippines. The characteristic marches are the "touch" of trumpets, bugles and cors de chasse, and the steady rhythm of the percussion section, with contrasting festive spirit and martial beats. In the 19th century, the light infantry of the Army adopted a militarized form of the civil Charanga tradition of southeastern and northern Spain, a tradition the Spanish Navy would adopt for naval units and ship's company bands.

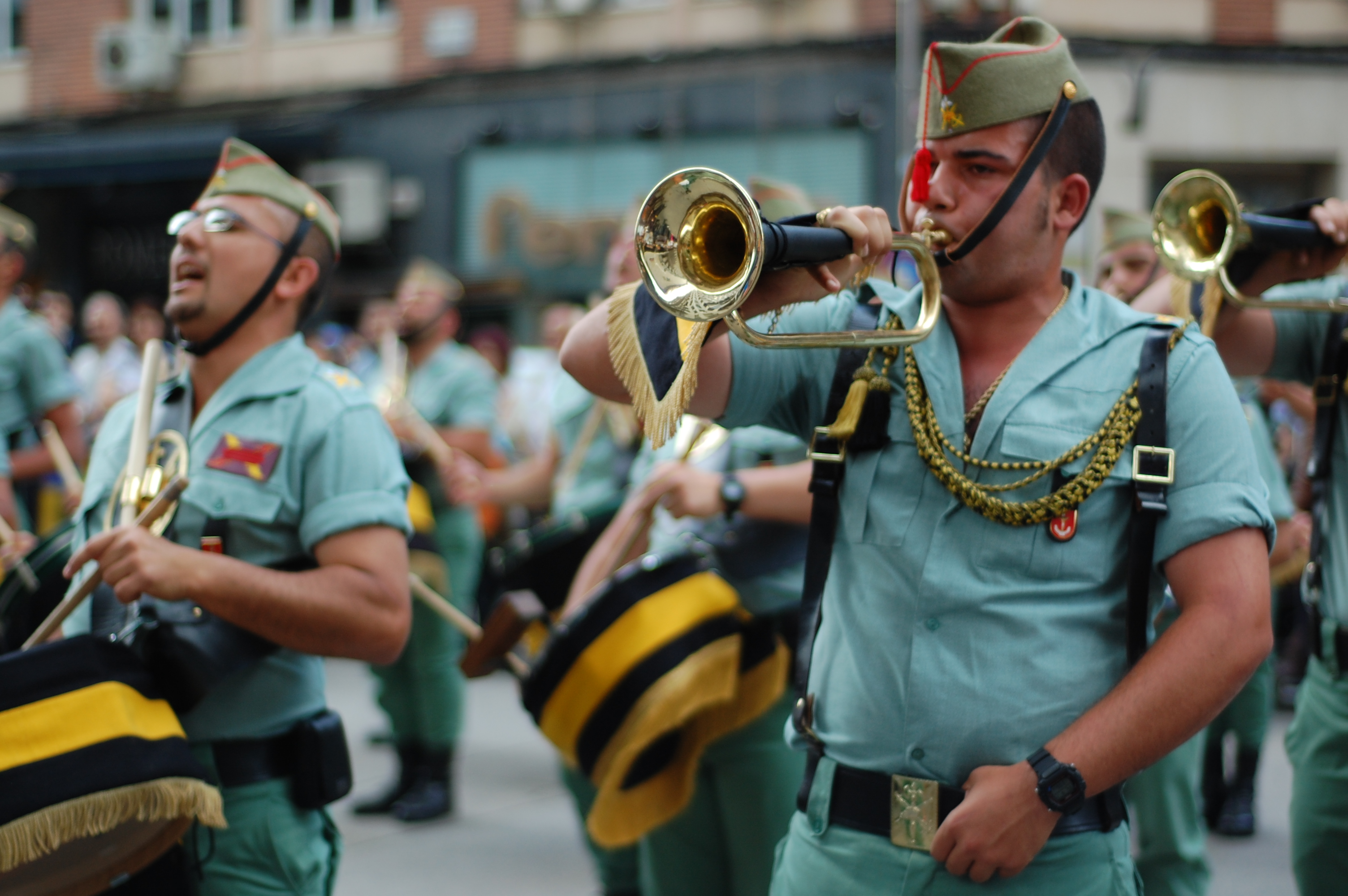
Plain bugles are traditionally used in the bugle bands of the Spanish Legion.

Band formations in the Spanish Armed Forces, all under the Band Corps within the Common Corps, follow the British model, but Spanish bands tend to have the most senior bandsmen or bandsman, playing a tuba, positioned at the head of the band or at the second line. The tubaist is usually the band sergeant major or the band corporal, mostly stationed in between the trombone players or leading a file of tuba and euphonium players in some bands. Bugle bands are part of the Spanish musical tradition since the 19th century when the bugle replaced the fife in the Spanish Army and Navy, and these bands consist of drummers and buglers (or trumpeters in the cavalry dismounted bands since the 20th century). Such formations, when massed together, are led by a Director of Music and a Drum Major (with a Bugle Major or a Trumpet Major depending on the specialty arm). The century-old Corps of Drums of the Regulares is led by a Drum Major and a Bugle Major with personnel playing the snare, bass, and single tenor drums, bugles, North African flutes and sometimes bagpipes, and the Spanish Royal Guard (as well as the 1st King's Immemorial Infantry Regiment of AHQ) sport Corps of Drums playing drums and fifes and wearing 18th-century uniforms. Plain bugles, by tradition, are used in the bugle bands of the Spanish Legion and the Paratrooper Brigade instead of the valved bugles used by other bands and the trumpets and bass drum used by the Royal Guards. Within units based in Galicia and Asturias, military pipe bands are in service as well. Only the Civil Guard and the Royal Guard retain mounted bands with cavalry trumpeters, both of which also having mounted kettledrummers.

Today, there are 26 bands or "Music Units" (Unidad de Música) whose members belong to the Band Corps. They are divided as follows: 15 of them in the Army, 5 in the Navy, and the rest in the Air Force. Their areas of operations include: Andalucía, Aragon, Canarias, Castilla-La Mancha, Castilla y León, Ceuta, Comunidad Valenciana, Galicia, Madrid, Melilla, and Murcia. A school of music is based in the Carabanchel district of south western Madrid as part of the Central Defence Academy with the purpose of training individuals in the Band Corps.

=== Sweden ===
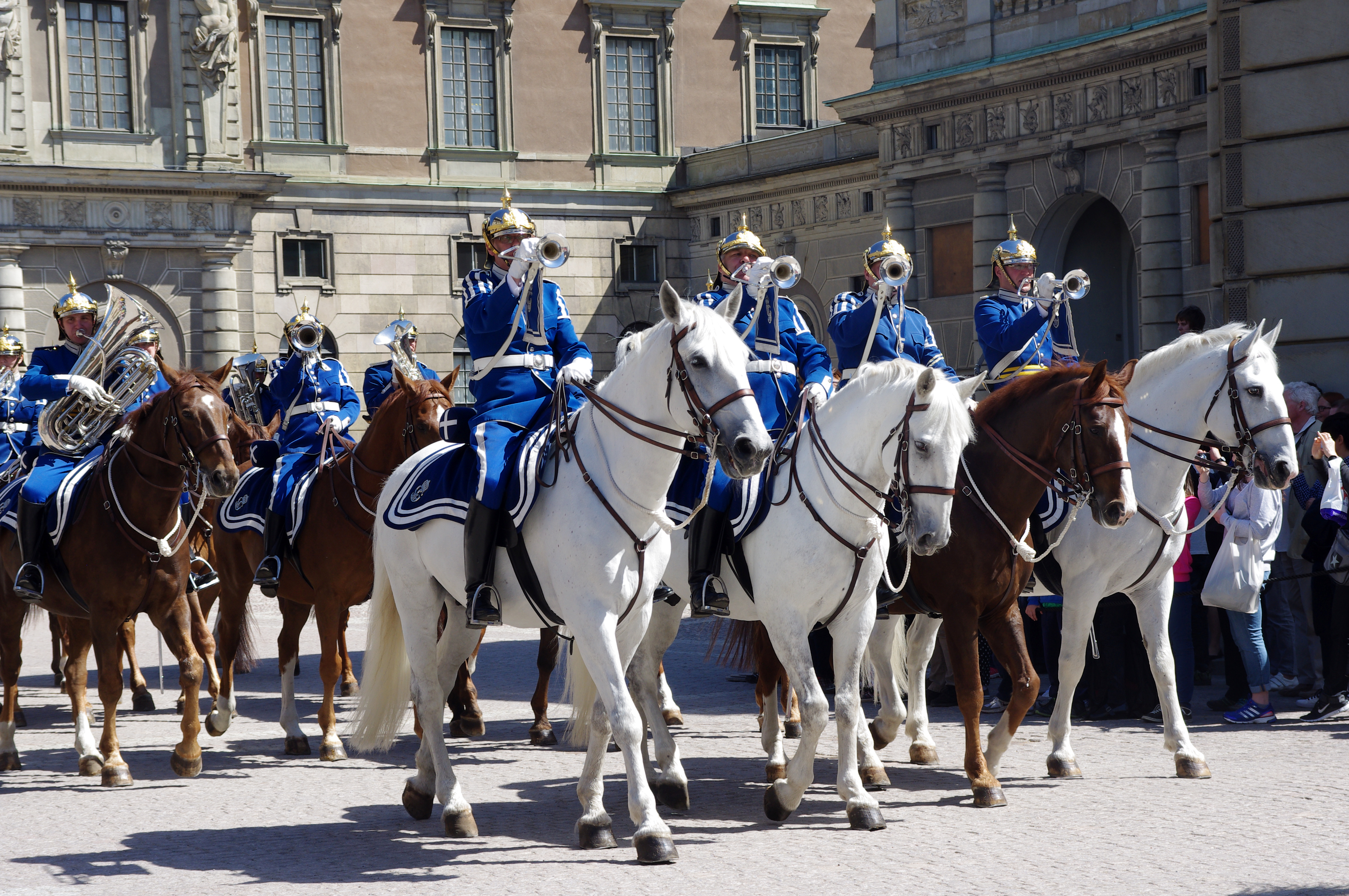
The Life Guards' Dragoon Music Corps performing during the National Day of Sweden in 2012

Traditionally, every Swedish regiment had a band. During the 20th century, many of them were disbanded and in 1957 all remaining military bands were merged into one per garrison or disbanded entirely. The Swedish military music was made into a non-military organization in 1971 but this proving unsuccessful, the Royal Swedish Army Band was set up in 1982, followed by several other bands in the 1990s. As of 2010 the Swedish Armed Forces no longer have conscripts, but professional soldiers. The military musicians in the Swedish Armed Forces Music are now professional musicians with civil ranks (CR-1/8) or professional soldiers with military ranks (OR-1/5). Today, Swedish military music has undergone new cuts, retaining two bands only in the army and one in the navy and only a single field music formation. In addition, there are 25 bands in the Swedish Home Guard, all of which are under the command of the Hemvärnsmusiken.

Formations in these bands are a mix of the Italian, German and British band traditions. The current active bands of the Swedish Armed Forces includes the Royal Swedish Army Band, and the Life Guards' Dragoon Music Corps, both of which are based in Stockholm; and the Royal Swedish Navy Band, based in Karlskrona. All three report to the Swedish Armed Forces Music Corps.

=== Switzerland ===
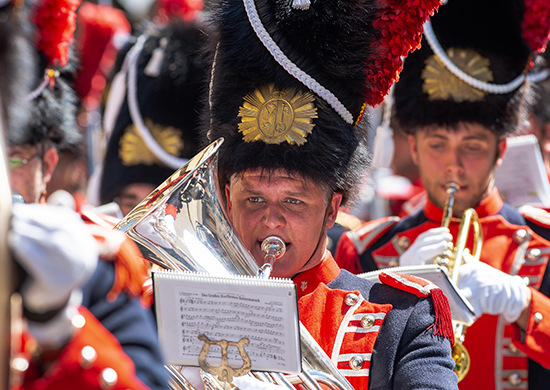
The Band of the Vieux Grenadiers is a civilian group dressed in the uniforms of the Swiss military from the 18th century.

The Swiss Army Central Band is the main military band in the landlocked confederation. It is based on mostly German and French, but also Italian and British influences. It serves as the Swiss Armed Force's sole ceremonial ambassador as the military does not have a permanent ceremonial (guards of honour are mounted by regular units). Despite having affiliations with the military, as well as its 18th century uniforms and precision drill, the civilian Top Secret Drum Corps is not a Swiss military band. The Military Music Competence Center (Kompetenzzentrum Militärmusik) is an organizational unit which specializes in the training of military musicians for service.

Also in service is the Conscript Band of the Swiss Army, which is manned by musician conscripts serving their national service term in the Armed Forces. Other bands include the Swiss Army Strings, the Swiss Army Big Band, Swiss Army Brass Band, the Swiss Military Small Band and the Swiss Army Concert Band. The Swiss Military Small Band is composed of musicians from the Brass Band Recruit School who finished an 18-week basic training in May 2018.

=== Ukraine ===
Military bands in Ukraine are subordinated to the Military Music Department of the General Staff of the Ukrainian Armed Forces. The following bands that form part of this department can be categorized into the following: band centers, academy bands and unit bands. The three seniormost bands in the Ukrainian Armed Forces are the National Exemplary Band of the Armed Forces of Ukraine and National Presidential Band of Ukraine and the Band of the Kyiv Presidential Honor Guard Battalion. The National Exemplary Band is the largest in the armed forces, employing over 100 musicians. There is a quota for the number of musicians different bands, with the headquarters bands of music centers of each armed service branch employing 52 members, and academic bands employing 21 members.

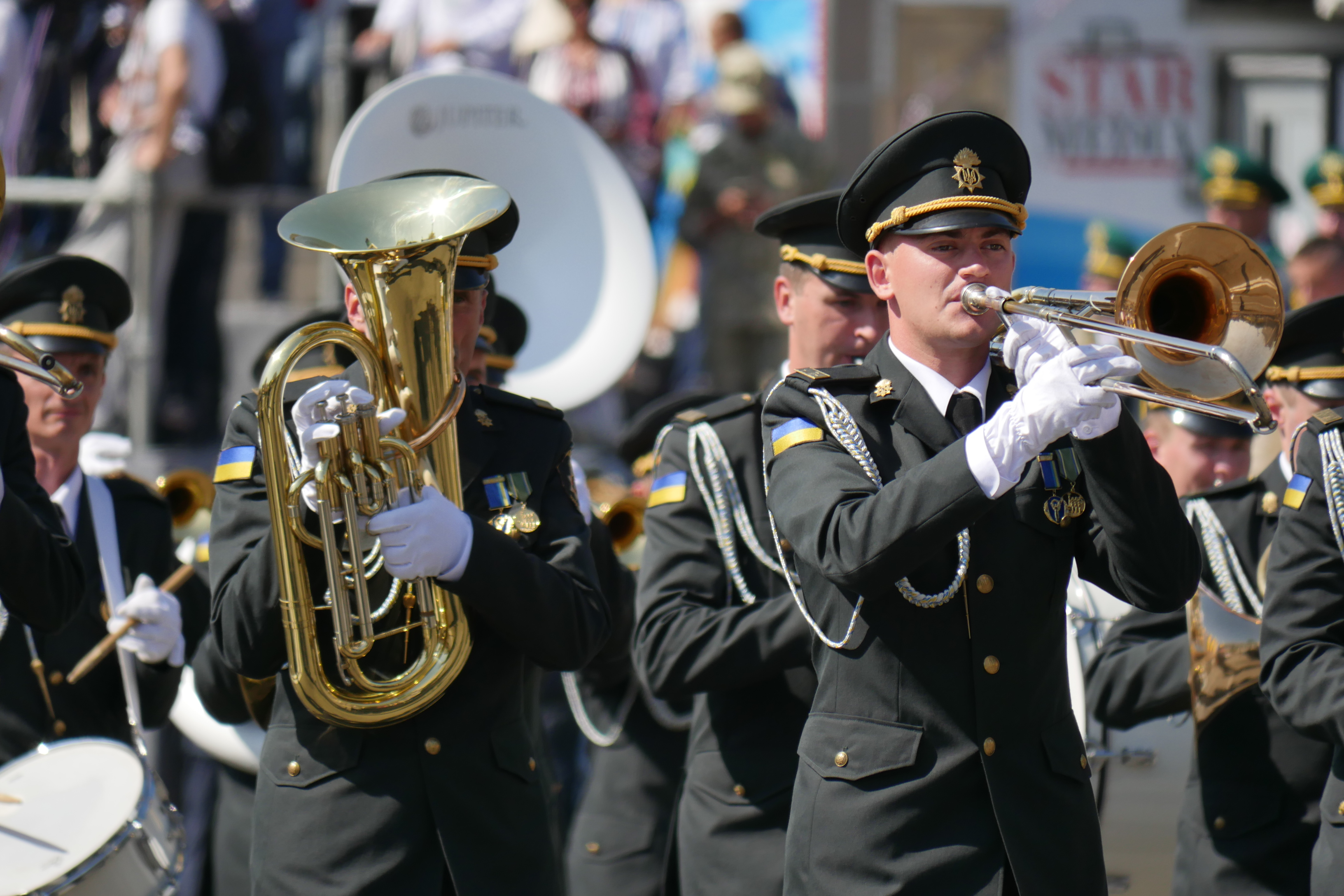
The Military Band Service of the National Guard of Ukraine perform during the Independence Day of Ukraine in 2018.

The Military Band Service of the National Guard of Ukraine consists of the Central Band of the National Guard of Ukraine, the Band of the National Guard Military Academy of Ukraine, the Band of the NGU National Honor Guard Battalion Kyiv and the Band of the National Guard NCO Training School. Ukrainian massed bands are known for their unconventional use of stationary instruments such as the Timpani and tubular bells. Since the Russian Army annexed Crimea in 2014 followed by the Russo-Ukrainian War, Ukrainian military bands have been ordered to orient their marching styles, as well as their drum majors to military bands in the European Union and NATO armed services.

In May 2016, soldiers from the Band of the 44th Artillery Brigade in Ternopil performed Shche ne vmerla Ukraina nearly 300 metres underground, breaking a world record. The Band of the 194th Pontoon-Bridge Regiment of the State Special Transport Service (established in October 2001) also serves as a military band despite it not being part of the armed forces.

=== United Kingdom ===
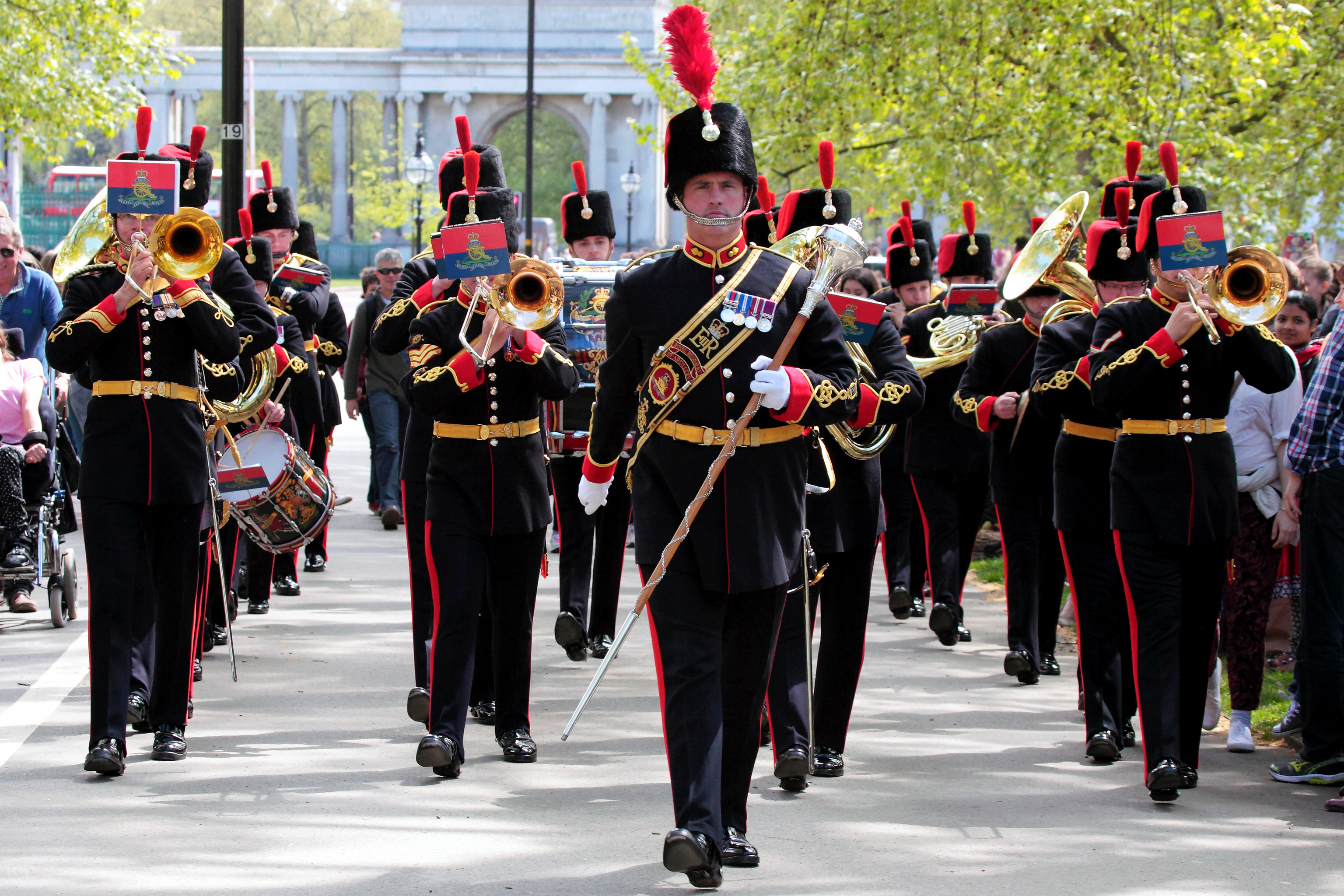
The oldest band in the British Army is the Royal Artillery Band, which can trace its origins to the Battle of St. Quentin, in 1557.

Since later medieval times and the formation of the first bands, the United Kingdom has had a strong military band tradition. In 1993, Richard Morrison, the chief music critic of The Times noted: "One of the oddest statistics about British cultural life is that the Defence Ministry spends more to maintain military bands than the government spends on all the professional orchestras and opera companies in the country." The oldest military band in the British Armed Forces is the Royal Artillery Band. This can trace its origins back to 1557 at the Battle of St. Quentin, although it was not made 'official' until 1762. A series of army reviews starting in 1994 reduced the number of British Army bands from 69 to 22 and the number of personnel from 2,000 to 1,100.

All regular bands in the British Army are part of the Royal Corps of Army Music and there are currently 22 in service. They range in personnel number from 64 to 15 and include: traditional marching, mounted and concert bands, as well as rock bands and a small string orchestra. The bands of the Royal Corps of Army Music are:

- The Band of The Household Cavalry - Hyde Park Barracks, London and Combermere Barracks Windsor
- The Band of the Royal Armoured Corps - Catterick, North Yorkshire
- The Royal Artillery Band - Tidworth
- The Band of the Corps of Royal Engineers - Chatham, Kent
- The Band of the Royal Corps of Signals - RAF Cosford, West Midlands
- Band of the Grenadier Guards - Wellington Barracks, Central London
- Band of the Coldstream Guards - Wellington Barracks, Central London
- Band of the Scots Guards - Wellington Barracks, Central London
- Band of the Irish Guards - Wellington Barracks, Central London
- Band of the Welsh Guards - Wellington Barracks, Central London
- The Band of The Royal Regiment of Scotland - Edinburgh
- The Band of The Queen's Division - RAF Henlow, Bedfordshire
- The Band of The King's Division - near Preston
- The Band of The Prince of Wales' Division - St Athan, South Wales
- The Band and Bugles of The Rifles - Winchester
- The Band of The Parachute Regiment - Colchester
- The Band of the Brigade of Gurkhas - Shorncliffe, near Folkestone
- The Band of the Army Air Corps - Colchester
- The Band and Corps of Drums of The Royal Logistic Corps - near Camberley
- The Band of the Corps of Royal Electrical and Mechanical Engineers - Catterick, North Yorkshire
- The Band of the Adjutant General's Corps - near Winchester
- The Countess of Wessex's String Orchestra - Woolwich, London

The British Army also has 20 reserve military bands located across the United Kingdom and Gibraltar:

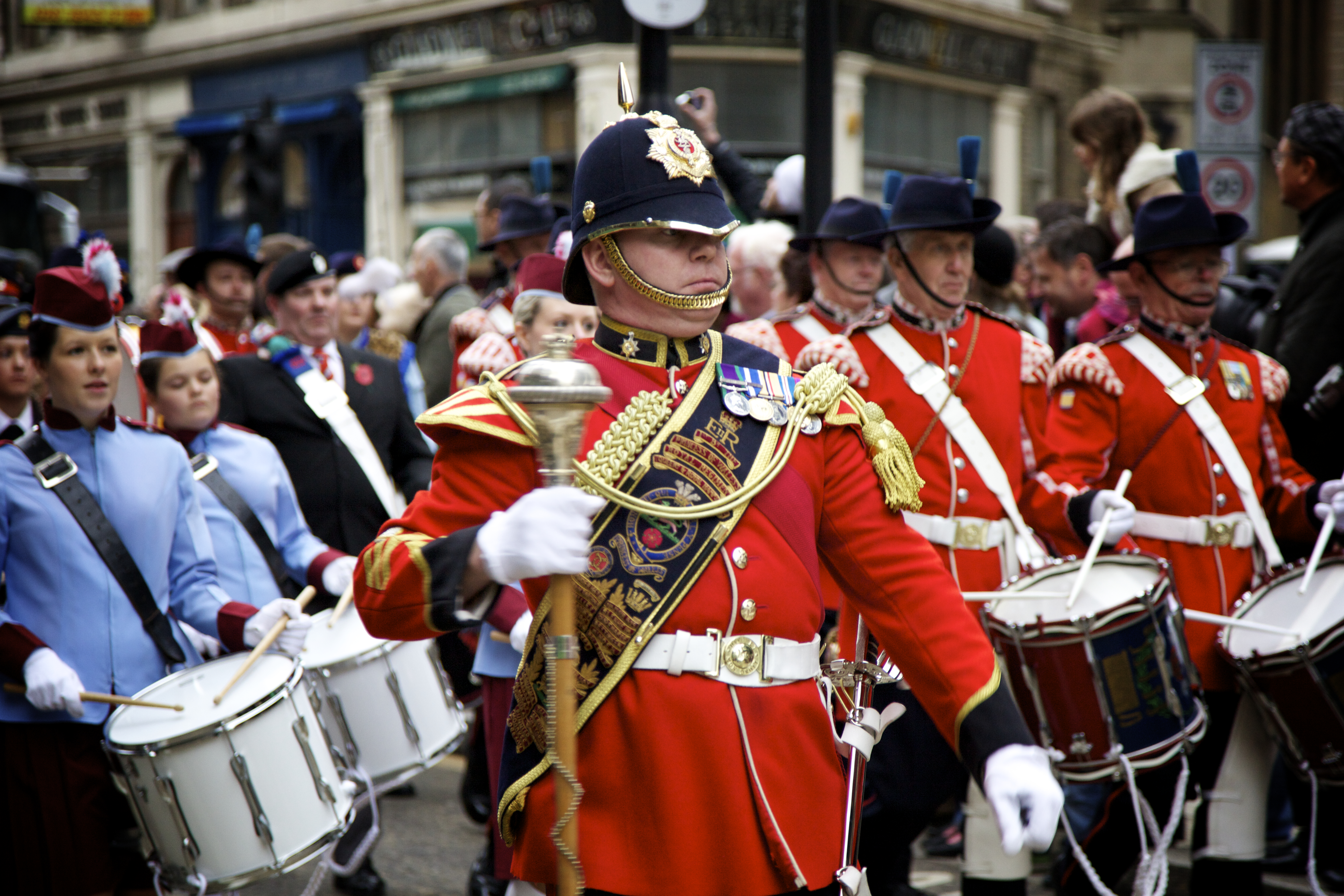
The Princess of Wales's Royal Regiment's Corp of Drums at the Lord Mayor's Show in 2010

- Band of the Honourable Artillery Company
- Regimental Band (Inns of Court & City Yeomanry) of the Royal Yeomanry
- Lancashire Artillery Volunteers Band
- The Nottinghamshire Band of the Royal Engineers
- The (Northern) Band of the Royal Corps of Signals
- Lowland Band of the Royal Regiment of Scotland
- Highland Band of the Royal Regiment of Scotland
- Band of the Princess of Wales's Royal Regiment (Queen's and Royal Hampshires)
- Band of the Royal Regiment of Fusiliers
- Band of the Royal Anglian Regiment
- Volunteer Band of the Royal Gibraltar Regiment
- Band of The Royal Irish Regiment (27th (Inniskilling) 83rd and 87th and Ulster Defence Regiment)
- Band of the Royal Welsh - The only Brass Band in the Reserve Army
- Band of the Duke of Lancaster's Regiment (King's Lancashire and Border)
- Band of the Yorkshire Regiment (14th/15th, 19th & 33rd/76th Foot)
- The Band of The Mercian Regiment
- The Salamanca Band of The Rifles
- The Waterloo Band of The Rifles
- Band of the 150th (Yorkshire) Transport Regiment, Royal Logistic Corps
- Band of the Army Medical Services

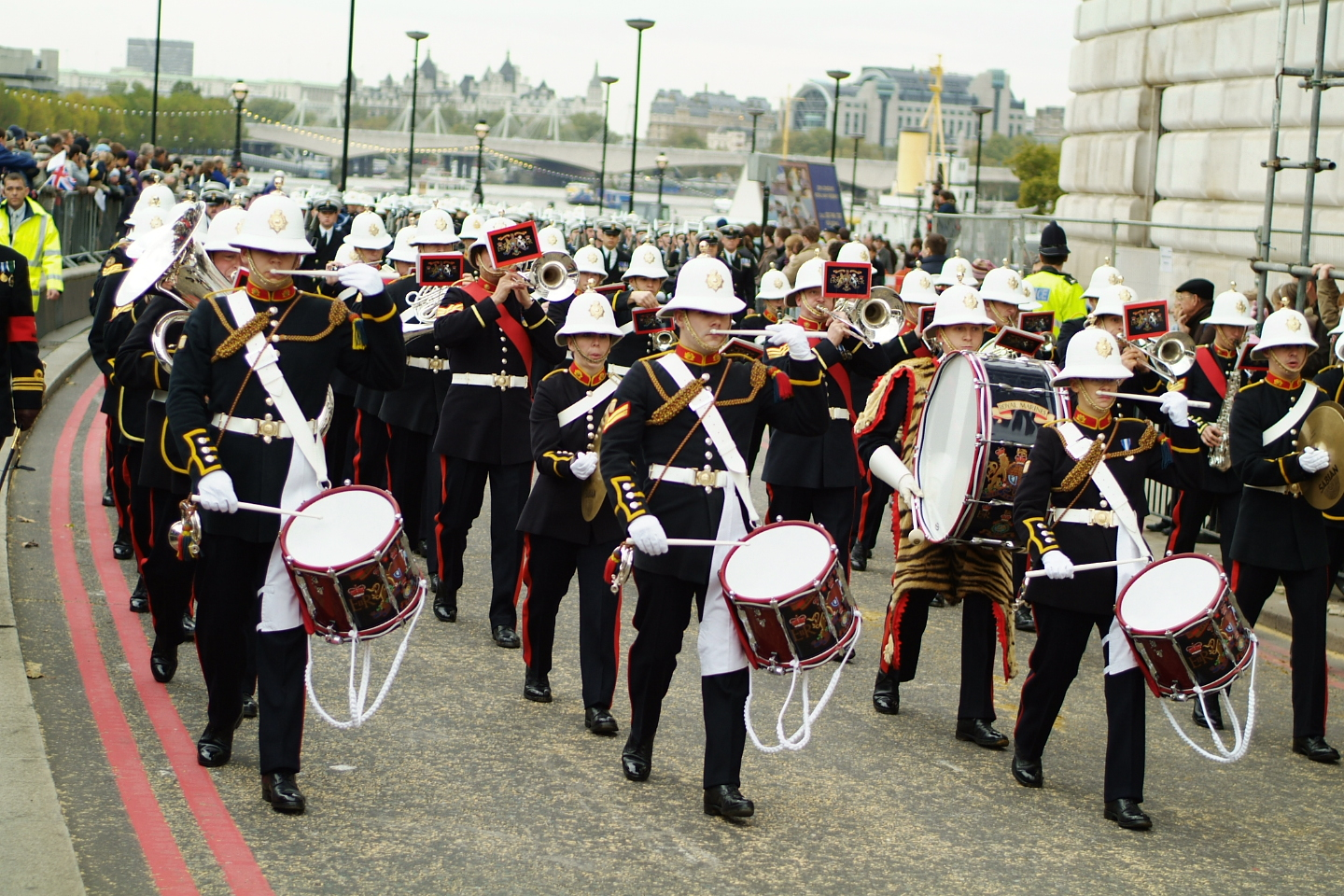
The Royal Marines Band Service is the only musical wing presently active in the Royal Navy.

The Royal Marines Band Service is, since 1950 and the disbandment of the Fleet Divisional Bands, the only remaining musical wing of the Royal Navy in service. It currently consists of six bands. Without doubt, groups of musicians existed in the service before 1767, when Royal Marines Divisional Bands were formed at the naval dockyard-bases of Chatham, Plymouth and Portsmouth and the naval gathering-point of Deal in the Downs, and marine bands (along with professional bands paid for by captains) plus their respective corps of drums provided music aboard ships before and during battles of the Napoleonic Wars (e.g. during the long sail into action at the Battle of Trafalgar).

At present, there are a total of five Royal Marine Bands and a Corps of Drums:

- Band of HM Royal Marines, Portsmouth (HMS Nelson)
- Band of HM Royal Marines, Plymouth (HMS Raleigh)
- Band of HM Royal Marines, Scotland (HMS Caledonia, Rosyth)
- Band of HM Royal Marines, HMS Collingwood (replacing the Band of Britannia Royal Naval College)
- Band of HM Royal Marines, Commando Training Centre Royal Marines

The band of the Royal Marines School of Music in Portsmouth (The Training Band) brings the total number to six.

The Royal Air Force Music Services is the organisation which provides military musical support to the Royal Air Force. Based at RAF Northolt (previously at RAF Uxbridge) and RAF Cranwell, it forms the central administration of one hundred and seventy musicians divided between the Central Band of the Royal Air Force, The Band of the Royal Air Force College, The Band of the Royal Air Force Regiment and Headquarters Music Services. These main military bands contain within their ranks the Royal Air Force Squadronnaires, Royal Air Force Swing Wing, Royal Air Force Shades of Blue, and The Salon Orchestra of the Central Band of the Royal Air Force.

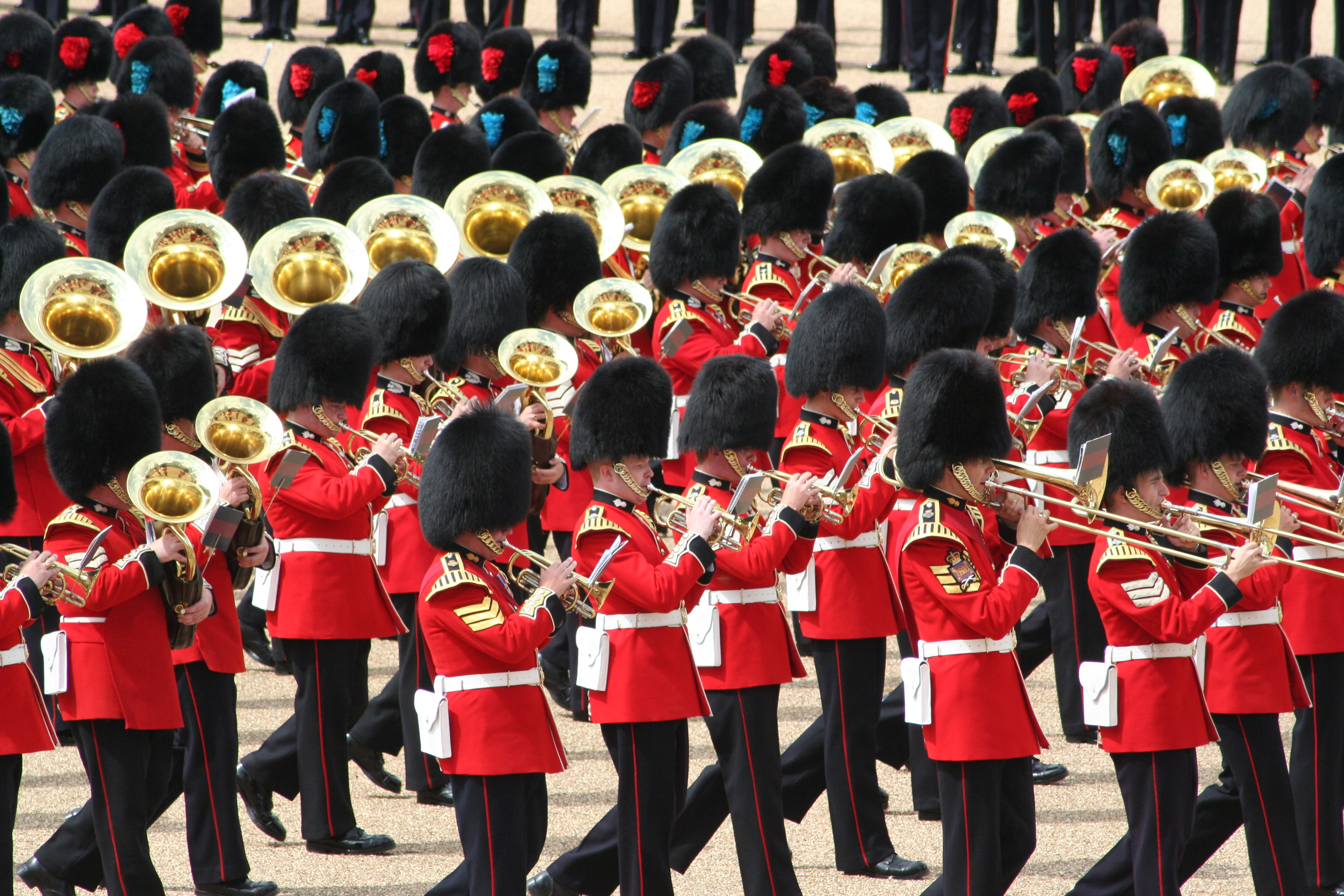
Massed bands of the British foot guards during the 2007 Trooping the Colour, an annual ceremony in which the military bands provide the music.

In the United Kingdom, the Mounted Band of the Household Cavalry and the Massed Bands of the Household Division perform at Trooping the Colour, an annual ceremony held every June on Horse Guards Parade to mark the official King's Birthday celebrations. The Massed Bands and the Mounted Band play a central role in this ceremony. The term "Massed Bands" denotes the formation of more than one separate band performing together, whether belonging to one or more regiments, or indeed countries.

== Military bands of Oceania ==
=== Australia ===
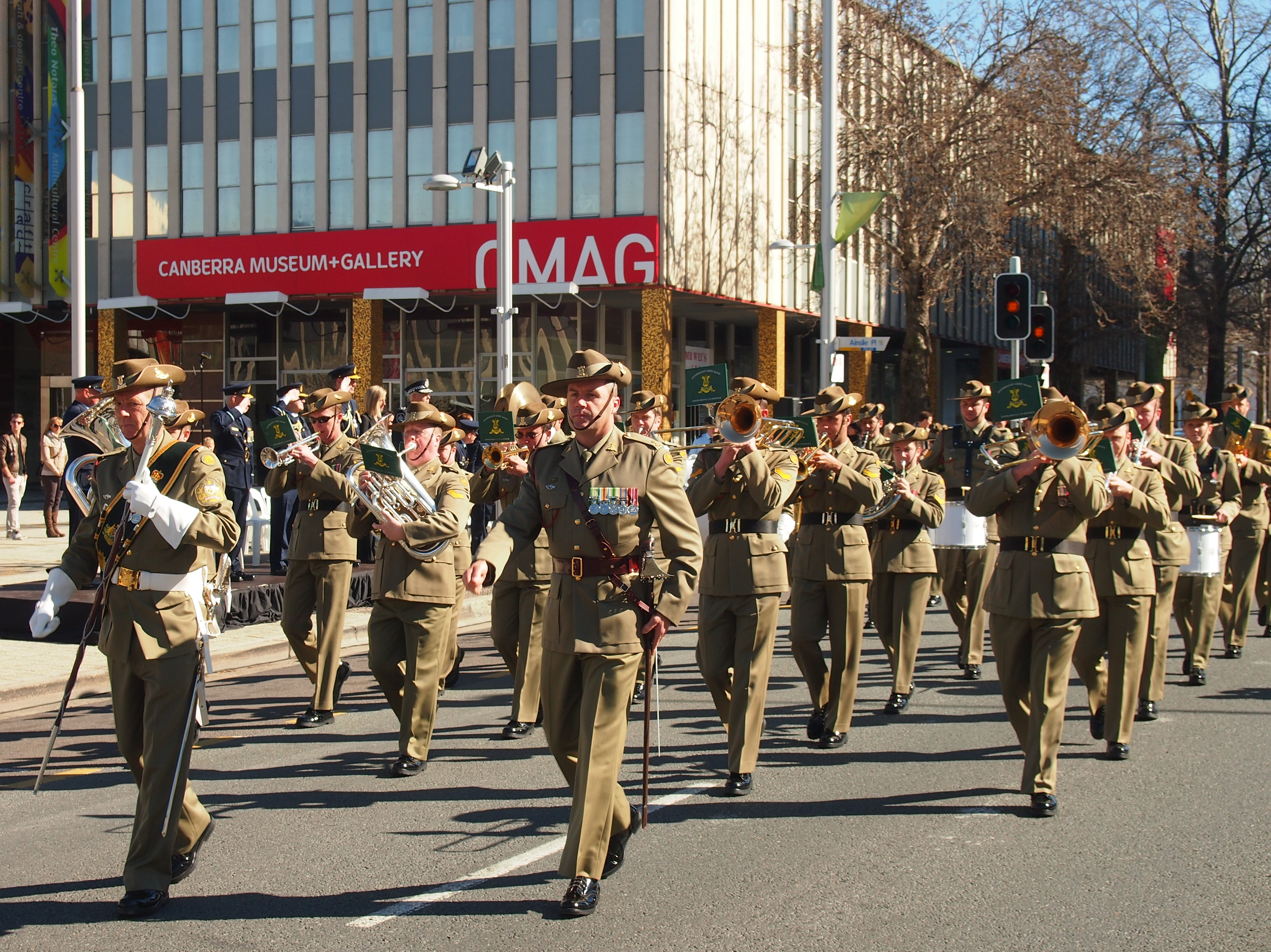
The Australian Army Band Corps, Canberra, 2013.

British military bands have served in the Australian colonies since their arrival in 1788 all the way up to 1870. During this period, the bands came from visiting British and non-British naval ships. These bands include the Band of the New South Wales Corps and the Band of the 73rd (Perthshire) Regiment of Foot. With the formation of the Regular Army in 1947, military bands were raised in each of the five commands and by 1955, there were 12 army bands. The seniormost of these bands was the Northern Command Band from Townsville. The RAAF Band was the first to take up the concert band format reflected local community bands at this time. At one point, the Australian Broadcasting Commission maintained its own military band. Branded as the ABC Military Band, it was formed in October 1933 and comprised 40 players from all Australian States, playing a concerts during the war to raise funds for Australian soldiers. It was disbanded in September 1951 due to low funding.

Military bands of the Australian Defence Force, and their formations on ceremonies and parades, are derived from those of the United Kingdom, with each service – Royal Australian Navy, Australian Army and the Royal Australian Air Force – having their own approach, based on the service military bands in the UK. For example, the Royal Australian Navy Band marches with drums at the front, whereas the bands of the other service branches have their trombone section at the front. The instrumentation also varies from band to band, as does the size of the ensemble.

The Royal Australian Navy Band maintains two sections of musicians, one based in Sydney and one near Melbourne (at H.M.A.S. Cerberus). Australian Army Band Corps has full-time bands based in Canberra, Wagga Wagga, Sydney, Brisbane, and Townsville, as well as part-time (Reserve) bands in Melbourne, Adelaide, Brisbane, Perth, Sydney, Newcastle, Hobart, and Darwin. There are also many Reserve pipes and drums bands attached to various units. The Royal Australian Air Force Band consists of a single 43 piece band based in Melbourne. The bands of all three services perform at ceremonial functions, such as Commemoration ceremonies and ANZAC Day marches, in addition to providing music capability for their respective services.

=== Fiji ===
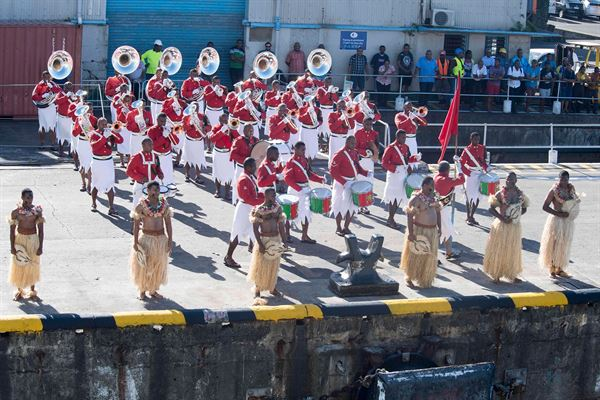
Fiji Military Forces Band performs as the USS Michael Murphy docks in Suva, Fiji.

The Republic of Fiji Military Forces sports only one military band, the Fiji Military Forces Band. The perform in the RFMF's ceremonial dress uniform, which consists of a red uniform with a traditional Fijian Sulu, which is also worn by the country's Presidential Palace Guards. The RFMF Band's formation is similar to their British counterparts, particularly the Royal Marines Band Service, which has its drum section at the front of the formation.

=== New Zealand ===
Military bands in New Zealand derive their formations from other Commonwealth and United States bands. They originated during the early 1840s, at the beginning of British rule. Since then, military bands have supported British and later New Zealand military events and commemorations. Before 1910, New Zealand military bands were attached to volunteer force units, with few regulations about the structure of bands.

In 1964, the number of army bands was reduced to seven, with the intention that the New Zealand Army Band replace the smaller part-time units with a central band. In 2012, nine of the then existing twelve New Zealand military bands were disbanded for reasons of economy. A single full-time band is now retained for each of the three armed services making up the New Zealand Defence Force: the New Zealand Army Band, the Royal New Zealand Air Force Band, and the Royal New Zealand Navy Band.

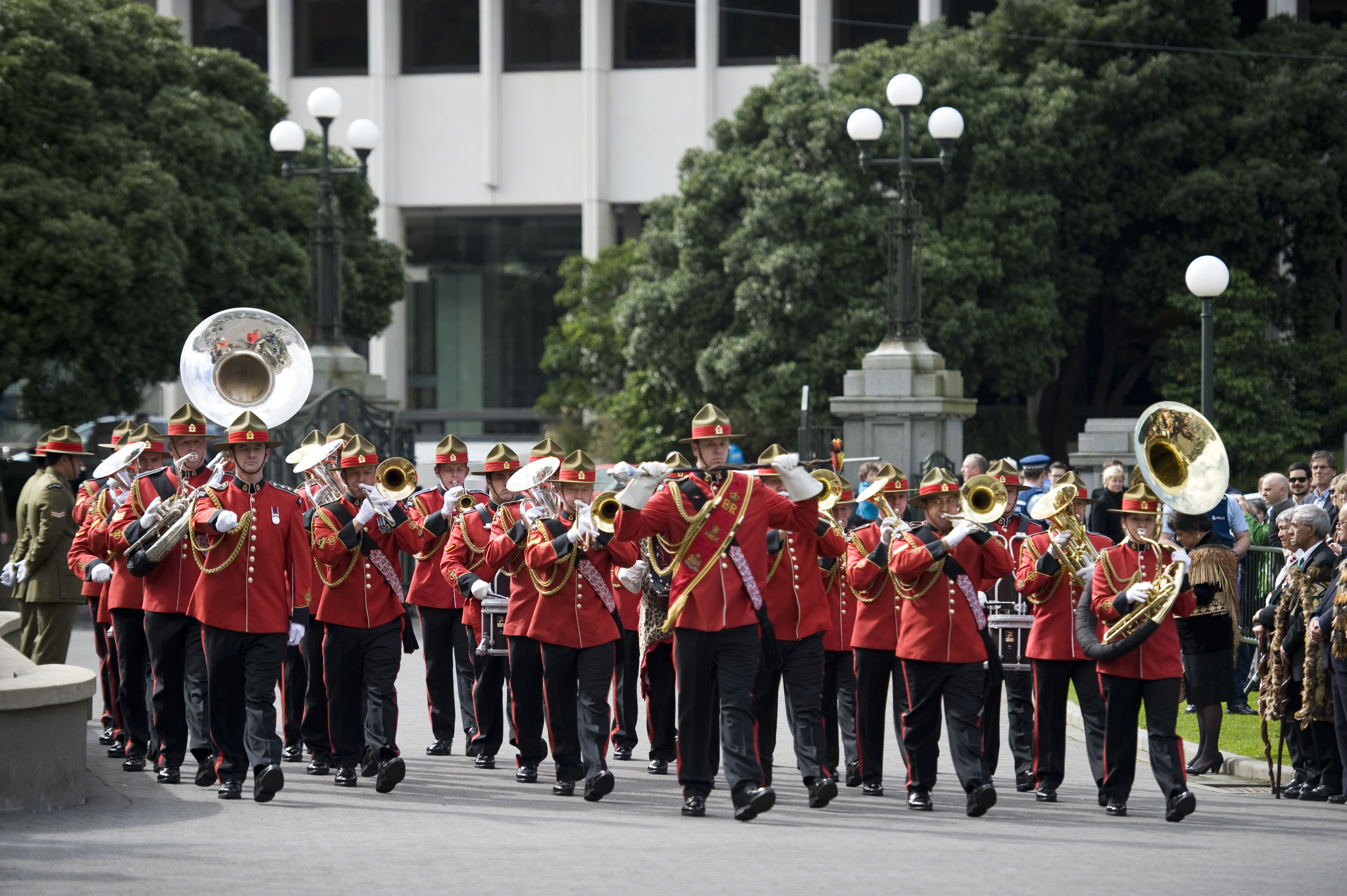
The New Zealand Army Band

Although the New Zealand Defence Force now formally maintains only these three military band services, there is also one (that of the Royal New Zealand Artillery) which survives as a voluntary unit separate from the regular armed services. As of 2024, this Auckland-based Band of the Royal Regiment of New Zealand Artillery is the oldest surviving military band in the country, having been founded in 1864.

=== Papua New Guinea ===
The Papua New Guinea Defence Force raised a platoon-sized military band in 2016, with the assistance of music personnel from Japan. The PNGDF Band traces its traditions and practices back to formations in other Commonwealth bands, specifically its former rulers, the United Kingdom and Australia; the latter of which Papua New Guinea was a former administrative territory of. Up until 1975, the Australian Army Band Corps, as well as other military bands of the Australian Defence Force provided musical support for the Royal Pacific Islands Regiment, which is still based on the island to this day.

== International military bands ==
Some military bands fall under the command of a certain political or military organization such as NATO or the European Union. Other military bands belong to a certain country however recruit most of its members from foreign countries in its area of responsibility (such as the United States Naval Forces Europe Band).

=== NATO ===
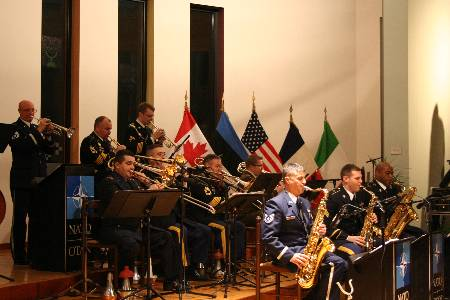
NATO's SHAPE International Band performing in 2011.

The SHAPE International Band is the official military band for the Supreme Allied Commander Europe (SACEUR) of NATO. Officially, it is based out of the Supreme Headquarters Allied Powers Europe in Mons, Belgium and functions as a public relations unit that represents the SACEUR and NATO as a whole. Although being mostly composed of musicians of the United States Armed Forces, it also consists of musicians from other countries in the alliance.

=== NORAD ===
The North American Air Defense (NORAD) Command Band was a military band sponsored by the United States Air Force and was composed of members from the US Army, Navy, and Air Force as well as the Royal Canadian Air Force. It was created in 1959 and operated as a 90-member touring orchestra. Notable members include Scottish-Canadian musician Bobby Herriot. In 1991, the band was re-designated as "America's Band in Blue" before being merged with the 15th Air Force Band of the Golden West in 1994, providing the premise for what is today the United States Air Force Band of the Golden West.

== IMMS ==
The International Military Music Society (IMMS) is a public organization based in the United Kingdom that is dedicated to encourage interest in military bands, their activities and history internationally. The society has branches and members in 38 countries.

== See also ==
- March (music)
- Martial music
- Military drums
- Ruffles and flourishes
- Marching band
- Mounted band
- Police band (music)
- Corps of drums
- Pipe band
- Fanfare band
- Drum and bugle corps (classic)
