= Border Security Force Camel Band =

Indian military band

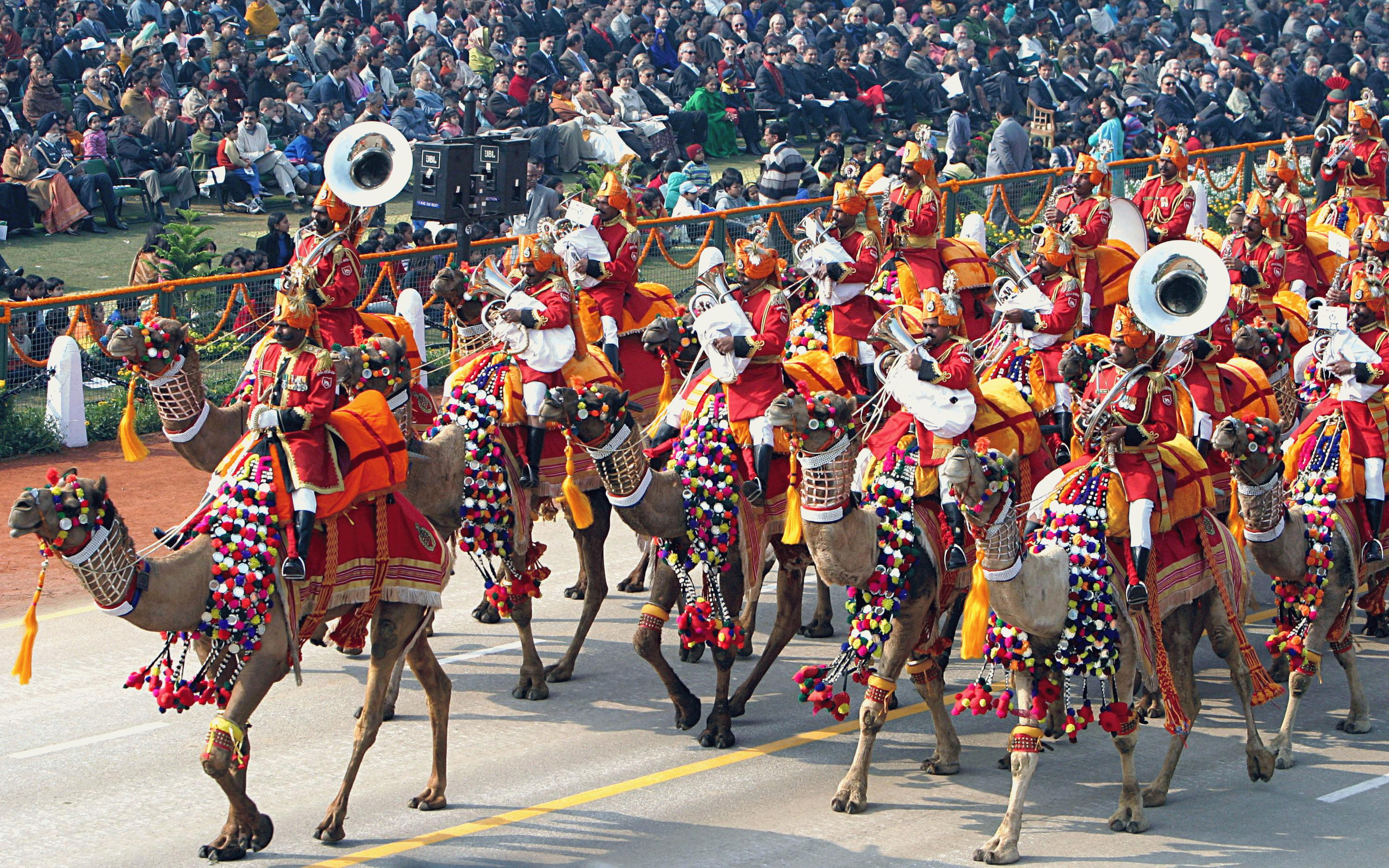
The BSF Camel Band during the annual Republic Day Parade in 2004.

The Border Security Force Camel Band is the mounted band of Border Security Force of India. The 36-member camel band is one of two official military bands in the BSF. It was formed in 1986 at the Rajasthan Frontier as a result of a concept introduced by Shri Rathore. It was the first camel mounted military band in the world to be established, being mentioned in Guinness Book of World Records as such. It is currently the only band of its kind in the world. After its establishment, it engaged in three years of intensive training until its first performance in January 1990. Deen Bandhu was the first bandmaster of the band.

It consists of thirteen musicians mounted specifically on dromedary camels. Its instrumentation includes a bass drum, two clarinets, a saxophone, a trumpet, a trombone, all led by a director of music.

== Republic Day ==
It is one of the unique sights of the Delhi Republic Day parade and has been an annual participant since 1990. The only time it has missed a parade was in 2016 due to a lack of preparation. In October 2019, the BSF protested the non-inclusion of its marching contingent, since it had only been asked to send its camel-mounted band to the Republic Day Parade. Scouts and Guides for Animals and Birds with OIPA: Indian People for Animals, through Naresh Kadyan, Retired Commissioner, Bharat Scouts and Guides, Haryana, moved PIL, before the Delhi High Court, for an order to ensure human treatment in the movement of 100 camels from Rajasthan to Delhi, to take part in Republic Day Parade.

== Other events ==
External videos
- NWI Exclusive Interview With Camel Mounted Band Of BSF

It is a permanent feature in Rajasthan and Marwar festivals and has also participated in various military tattoos. U.S. President Barack Obama lauded the performance of during his state visit to New Delhi on 5 November 2010. 10 years prior, it took part in the Royal Edinburgh Military Tattoo in Scotland. Besides the Republic Day Parade, it participates in the BSF Raising Day Event. It has also participated in many festivals across the country. The band and the ceremonial BSF Camel contingent perform regularly at the Jodhpur Sthapana Divas, the Thar Mahostav at Barmer, the Desert Festival of Jaisalmer, and the annual Camel Fair and Festival of Bikaner.

== See also ==
- Indian military bands
- Omani Royal Guard Military Band
- Life Guards' Dragoon Music Corps
- Mounted Band of the Household Cavalry
