= Mounted band =

Class of musical ensembles

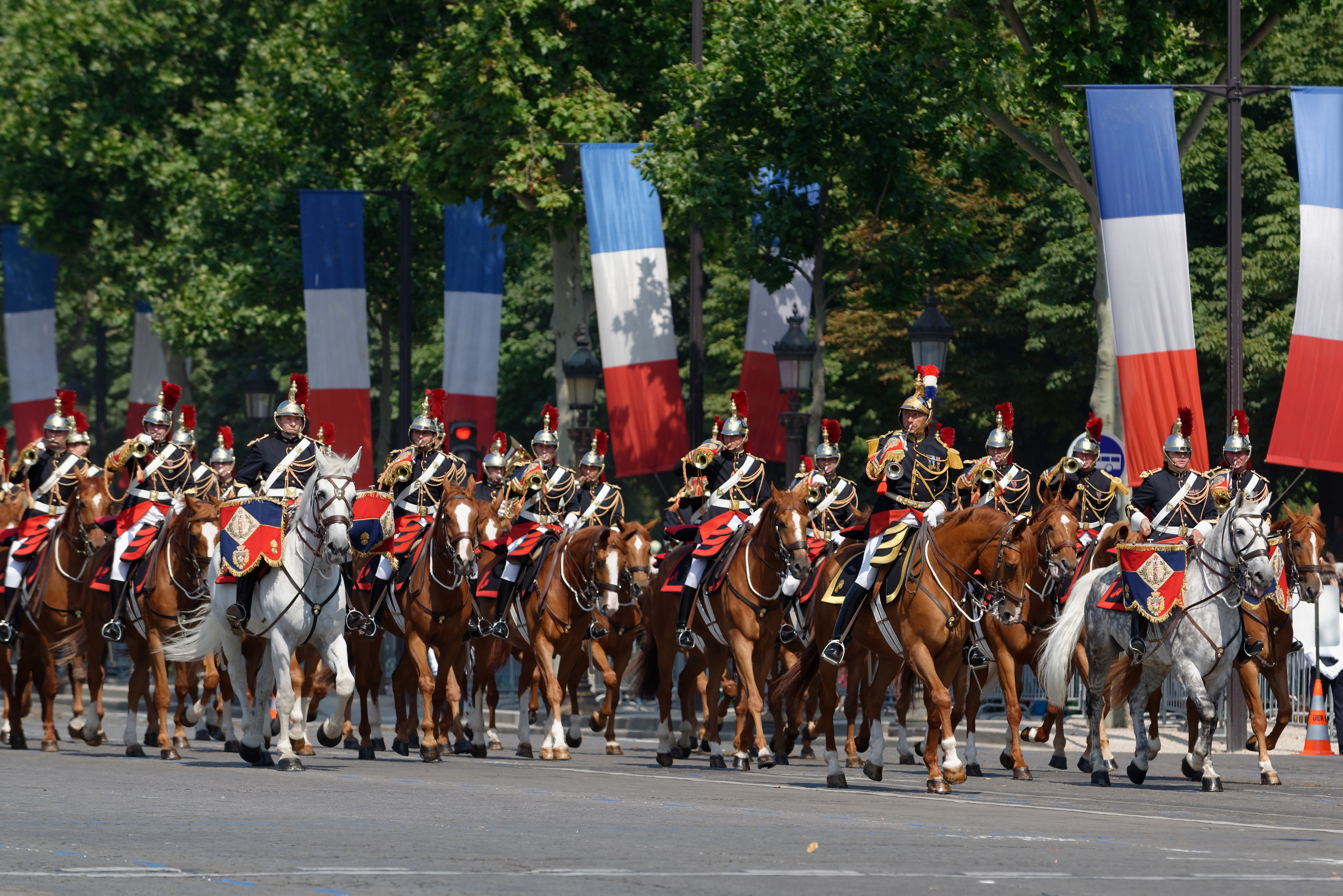
Mounted members of the French Republican Guard Band, a fanfare band during Bastille Day in 2013.

A mounted band is a military or civilian musical ensemble composed of musician playing their instruments while being mounted on an animal. The instrumentation of these bands are limited, with the musician having to play their instrument, as well as steer the animal to the designated location. Most mounted bands, therefore, use instruments that can easily be held, such as bugles, horns, and Fanfare trumpets. Timpani and glockenspiels are also a common feature, usually located at the head of a band. Although a band that is mounted on any member of the families Equidae and Camelidae are considered to be a mounted band, horses are most commonly used, mostly being employed in military bands in Europe, North and South America, and some parts of Asia.

== Functions and origins ==
Mounted bands in most cases are variants of military bands and are meant for the cavalry, and only several are in service today in various parts of the world. The main current functions have been providing musical support for ceremonial events, for civic events, and perform at military and police observances such as funerals and military and police academy graduations. Similarly to military and police, and Pipe bands, the musical repertoire is primarily based on ceremonial compositions and marches, with a high percentage also including honors music such as fanfares. A Cavalry march is used as military marching music in the movement of mounted troops. The marches of mounted bands are written in 6/8 time, rather than the 2/4 or 4/4 time of the infantry.

Mounted bands were originally established at sometime around the 12th century, during the crusades, with these newly established bands being incorporated into infantry bands. The idea then caught on in Central Europe before being used by the Ottoman Empire, who also created the first military band in the world. The use of timpani, trumpets, and bugles in these bands played an important role in the middle of the 15th century, when they were deployed to the front lines to motivate the mounted cavalry in battle and in parade.

== Mounted bands by country ==
=== Argentina ===
The seniormost band of the armed forces, the Alto Peru Fanfare Brass Band of the Regiment of Mounted Grenadiers, is the official mounted brass band in service to the President of Argentina in his/her capacity as Commander in Chief of the Armed Forces of the Republic. The brass band was founded in 1929. Despite it being a mounted band, it can also perform with the regiment while dismounted.

Another notable mounted band in the Argentine Army is the Mounted Band of the 4th Armoured Cavalry Regiment "General Lavalle's Cuirassiers", which wears uniforms similar to those of the French Republican Guard. Similar to the Alto Peru Band, despite it being a mounted band, it can also perform with the regiment while dismounted.

A new mounted band was raised in 2018 to serve as the ceremonial musical unit of the Mounted Operations Group of the 1st National Gendarmerie Region, Argentine National Gendarmerie.

=== Brazil ===
The Cyclophonica Bicycle Orchestra, founded in Rio de Janeiro in 1999, is the only civilian professional mounted band in the Americas. The only other similar group in the world is the Bicycle Showcase Crescendo, from the Netherlands. Cyclophonica has twelve musicians, playing more than 30 different instruments. The group is directed by its founder Leonardo Fuks, an oboist, multi-instrumentalist and professor of music acoustics at Rio de Janeiro Federal University.

Only the Military Police of São Paulo State maintains a traditional small mounted band section.

=== Chile ===
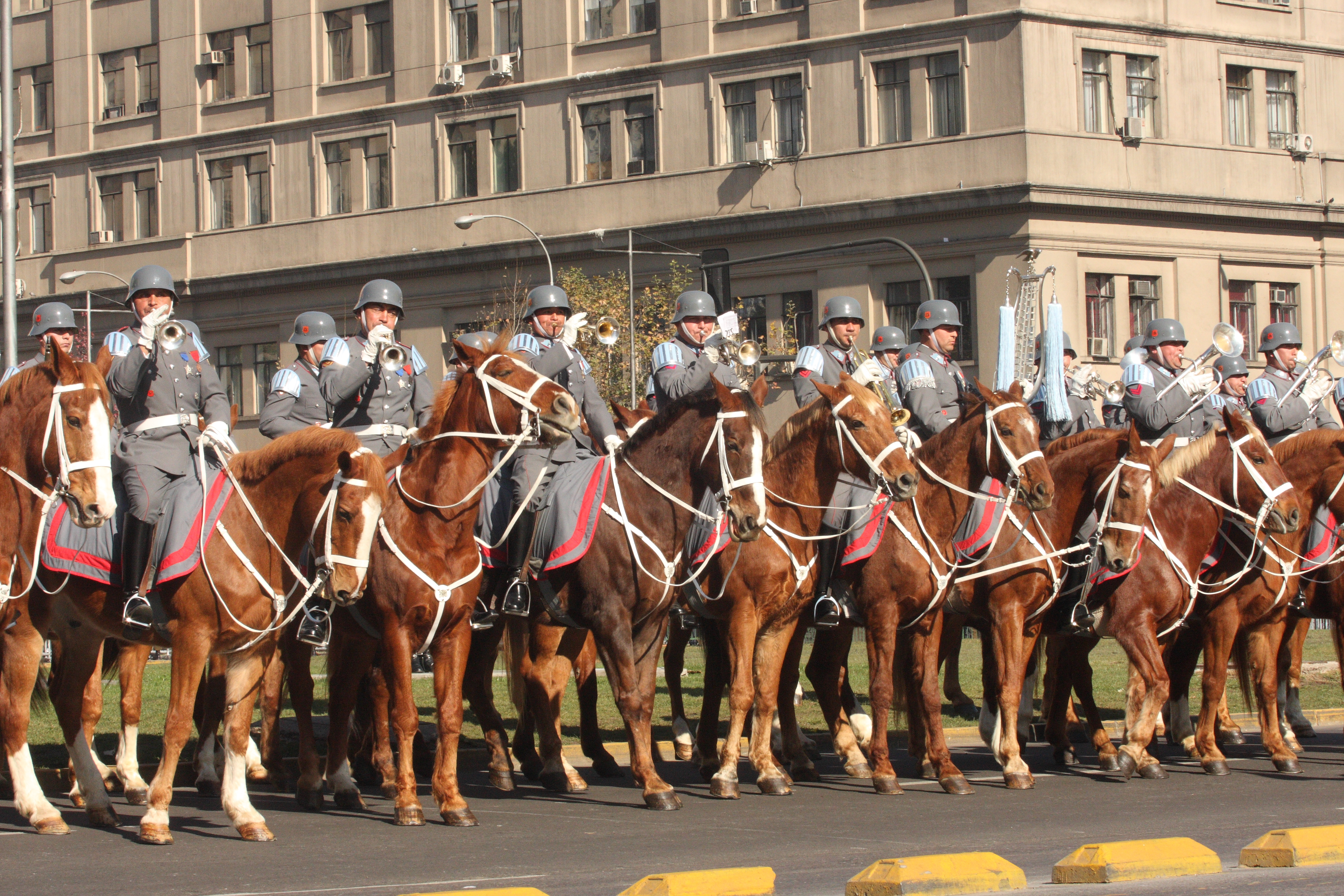
A mounted military band of the Chilean Army, in 2011

The following two Chilean mounted bands are the most notable in the Chilean Army:

- Mounted Band and Bugles of the 1st Cavalry Regiment "Guards Grenadiers"
- Band and Bugles of the 3rd Cavalry Regiment "Hussars"

Mounted band formations on parade follow the German model, having similar instrumentation with the infantry bands (and not with the brass of the German cavalry ensembles) with the exception being an added bugle section in place of the corps of drums of infantry units, a tradition inherited from France.

=== Denmark ===
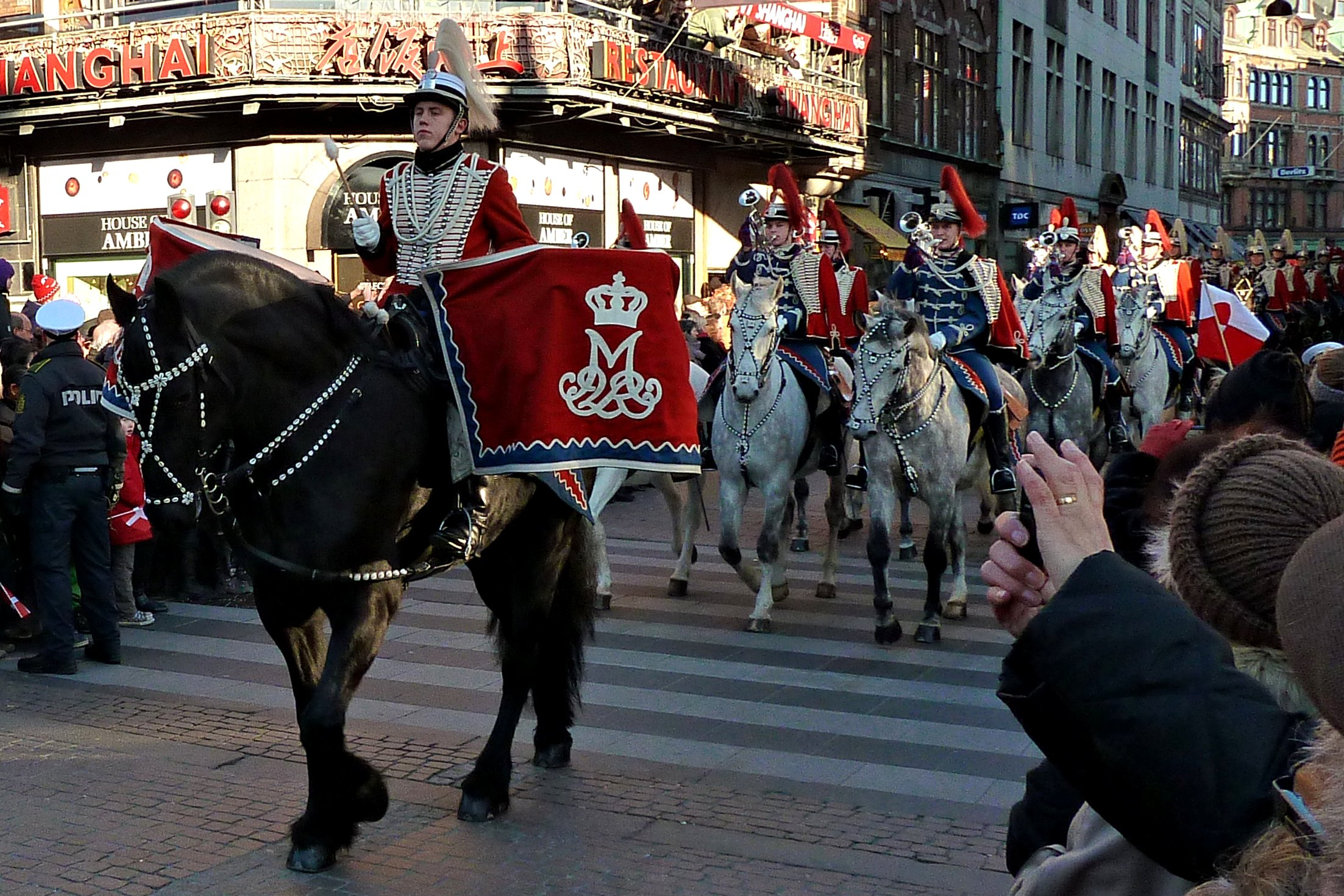
The mounted Timpani, with the royal monogram

In Denmark, the Guard Hussar Regiment Mounted Squadron has a mounted band (Gardehusarregimentets Hesteskadron Trompeterkorps), which consists of one timpanist and nine buglers. The band is used for military parades, when escorting the Monarch and foreign dignitaries, and shows.

=== Ecuador ===
The Mounted Band of the Ecuadorian National Police (Banda Instrumental Montada de la Unidad de Equitación y Remonta (UER) de la Policía Nacional) uses brass, woodwinds and percussion (sans the timpani). The fanfare band of the Presidential Mounted Ceremonial Squadron (Granaderos de Tarqui), also of the Army, is composed only of 2 timpani on drum horses, fanfare trumpets, 3 snare drums, 3 tenor drums and sousaphones (when mounted).

=== France ===
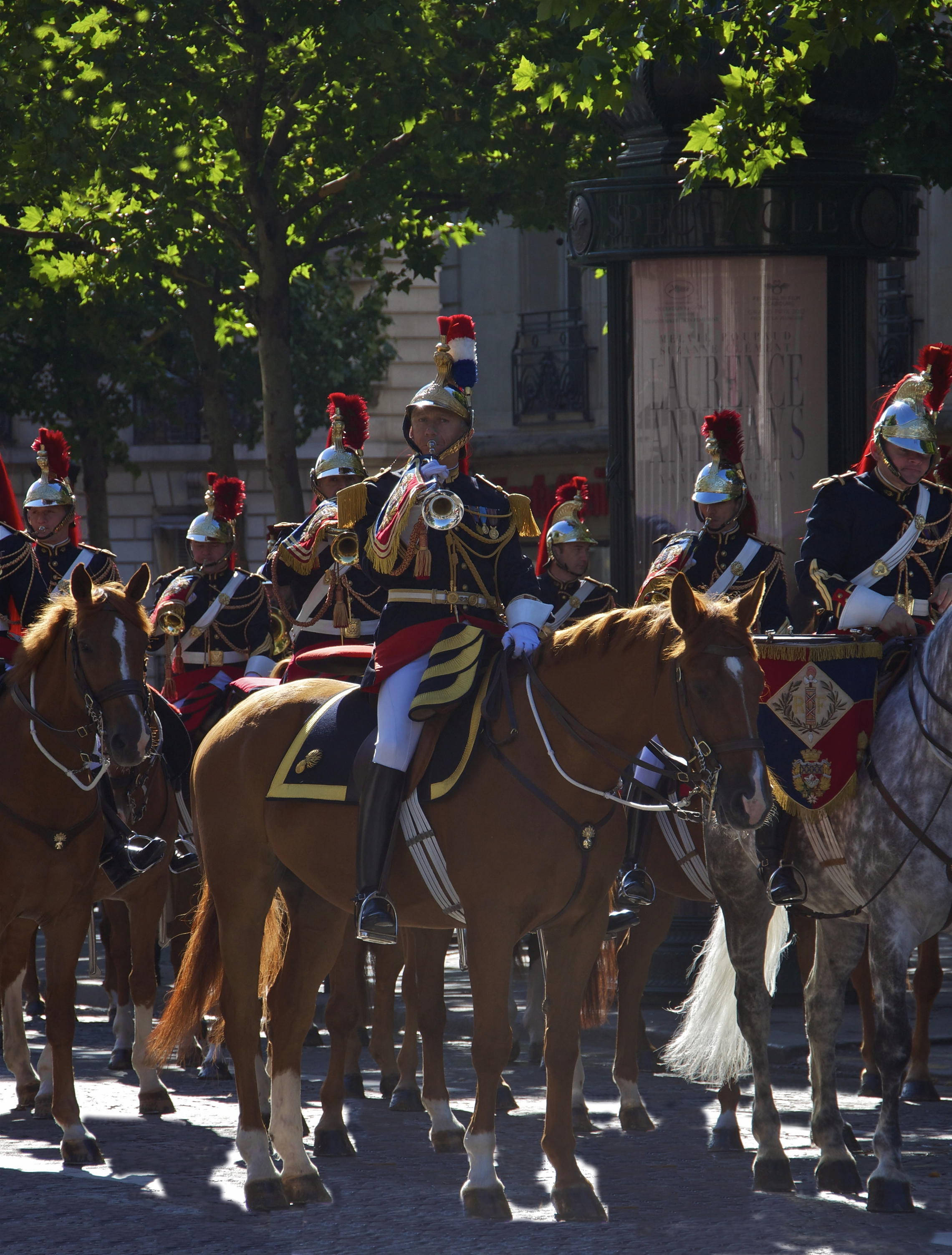
Captain Jacques Leblay, director of music of the mounted cavalry regiment of the Republican Guard.

The French Republican Guard Band maintains a mounted fanfare band (La Fanfare de Cavalerie de la Garde Républicaine), which is the seniormost of its kind in the French Armed Forces. In addition to the cavalry of the Republican Guard, the Armoured Cavalry branch of the French Army and Armored Branch maintain mounted fanfare detachments for use on ceremonial occasions. All three of these bands whether mounted or dismounted feature cavalry trumpets, bugles, kettledrums and marching percussion, as well as other one-handed instruments. Mounted bands began to encompass a larger instrumentation after a brief suppression by Napoleon. In the following years after, woodwind instruments were incorporated into French mounted bands.

=== Germany ===
A few civilian mounted bands exist today in modern Germany. The Imperial German Army in the 19th century sported many cavalry bands in its ranks before the end of the German Empire's 47-year rule in 1918. Prior to this, the most notable German mounted bands were located in the Kingdom of Prussia. Nazi Germany also sported many mounted bands during its 12-year rule. The number of mounted bands of the over 1,000 that existed in the Third Reich was alleged to be at least 138, according to some historians. Currently, a revival mounted band is underway in the state of Lower Saxony where a brass band, the Heidedragoner Brass Band, aims to honor the traditions of the 2nd Hannover Dragoon Regiment of the Imperial German Army by having a section of the band being mounted on horses. It began this tradition in 2013 and became fully active in 2016, becoming Germany's first military-styled civilian mounted brass band. Like its predecessors, the Heidedragoner Band is an all-brass band, and does not have a woodwind section, relying only on a timpanist when mounted. This was the case for all German Army mounted bands in the 19th century up to the early 20th.

During the Imperial German, Weimar Republic and Third Reich, the bandmaster of the mounted band carried a bugle as a signaling device similar to the baton of the infantry bands wherein he gave the signals to, among others, conduct the band, halt the music, and change the march tempo.

=== India ===
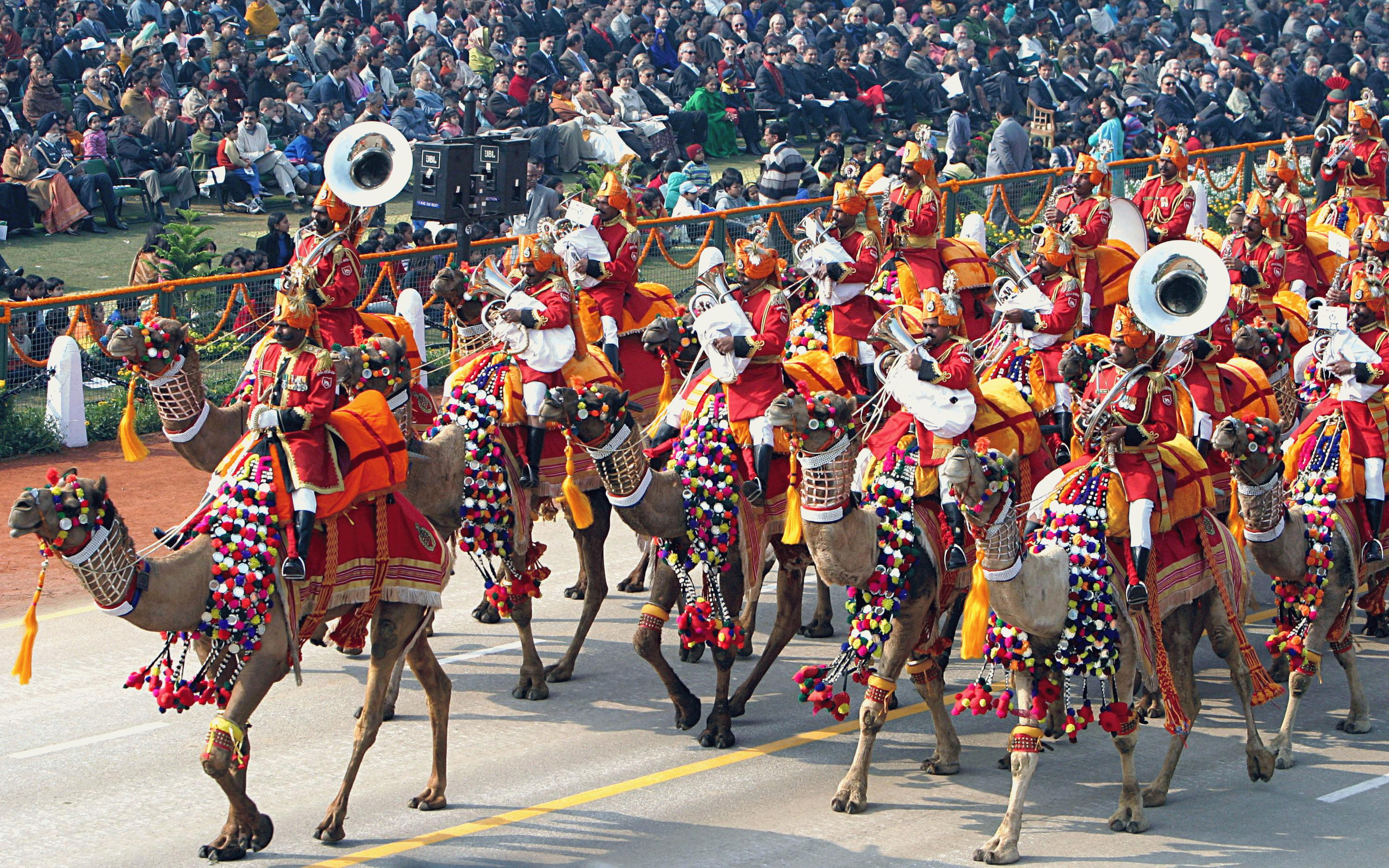
The unique BSF Camel Contingent during the annual Republic Day Parade in 2004.

The 36-member camel mounted band of the Indian Border Security Force is one of two official bands in the BSF. It is the only camel-mounted military band in the world, and is mentioned in Guinness Book of World Records as such. It is one of the unique sights of the Delhi Republic Day parade and has been an annual participant since 1990. Former Indian military mounted bands included the Gwalior Mounted Band.

=== Netherlands ===
The mounted band services are provided by the Fanfare Band of the Royal Marechaussee in the Netherlands (Trompetterkorps der Koninklijke Marechaussee). Based in Apeldoorn, the band consists of reservists and part-time musicians who work on average 2 days a week. Veterans of reserve bands also hold on to the mounted fanfare and bugle band traditions of the Dutch military. The Opende based Bicycle Showband Crescendo is unique in that the civilian band is composed of musicians who are mounted on bicycles while they are playing their instruments. Currently, there are only two civilian mounted bands in the world: Crescendo and the Brazilian Cyclophonica Bicycle Orchestra. Its military counterpart is the Fanfare Orchestra of the Royal Netherlands Army Cavalry, which can also play while mounted on bicycles and wearing uniforms of the 1940s.

=== Oman ===
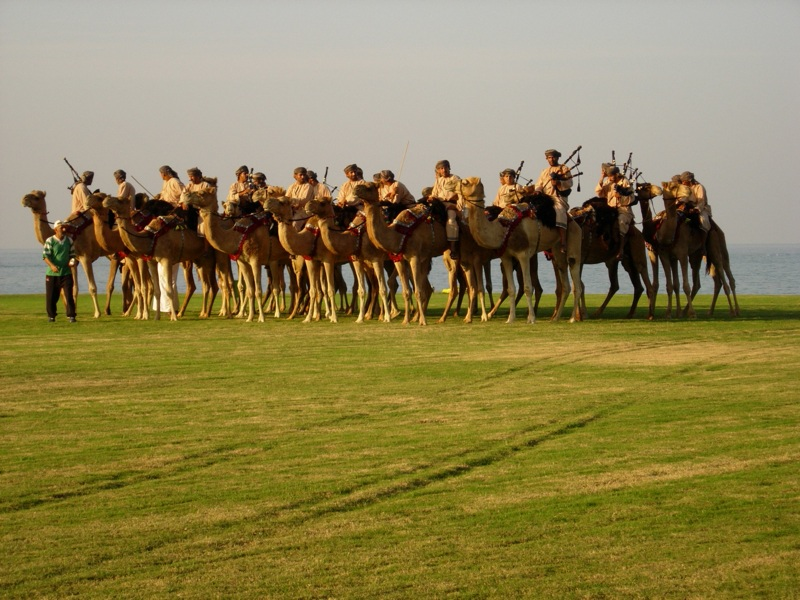
ROP Camel Band

Oman currently sports what is the only camel mounted pipe band. The official name of the band is the Royal Cavalry Mounted band, and it is a unit of the Royal Guard of Oman (RGO), specifically the central band. The horses are mainly a mix of Arabs, Clydesdales and Shires. The cavalry is composed of at least 100 horses and riders, all of whom are based in Al Safinat stables at the Royal Palace. The cavalry band is probably known the most for the fact that, since 2001, it has seen a significant number of women in its ranks, with women accounting for 25% of the riders in the band. On parade, the pipers lead the band while mounted on Arab horses, as a large carriage pulled by six Friesian horses carrying drummers immediately follows behind. In 2008, Sultan Qaboos bin Said al Said of Oman requested Kilmarnock-based McCallum Bagpipes design some specialized pipe tubes, due to the ones at the time having a history of leaving gaps in the pipers' teeth.

The Royal Oman Police also maintains a camel mounted band based in Muscat.

=== Peru ===
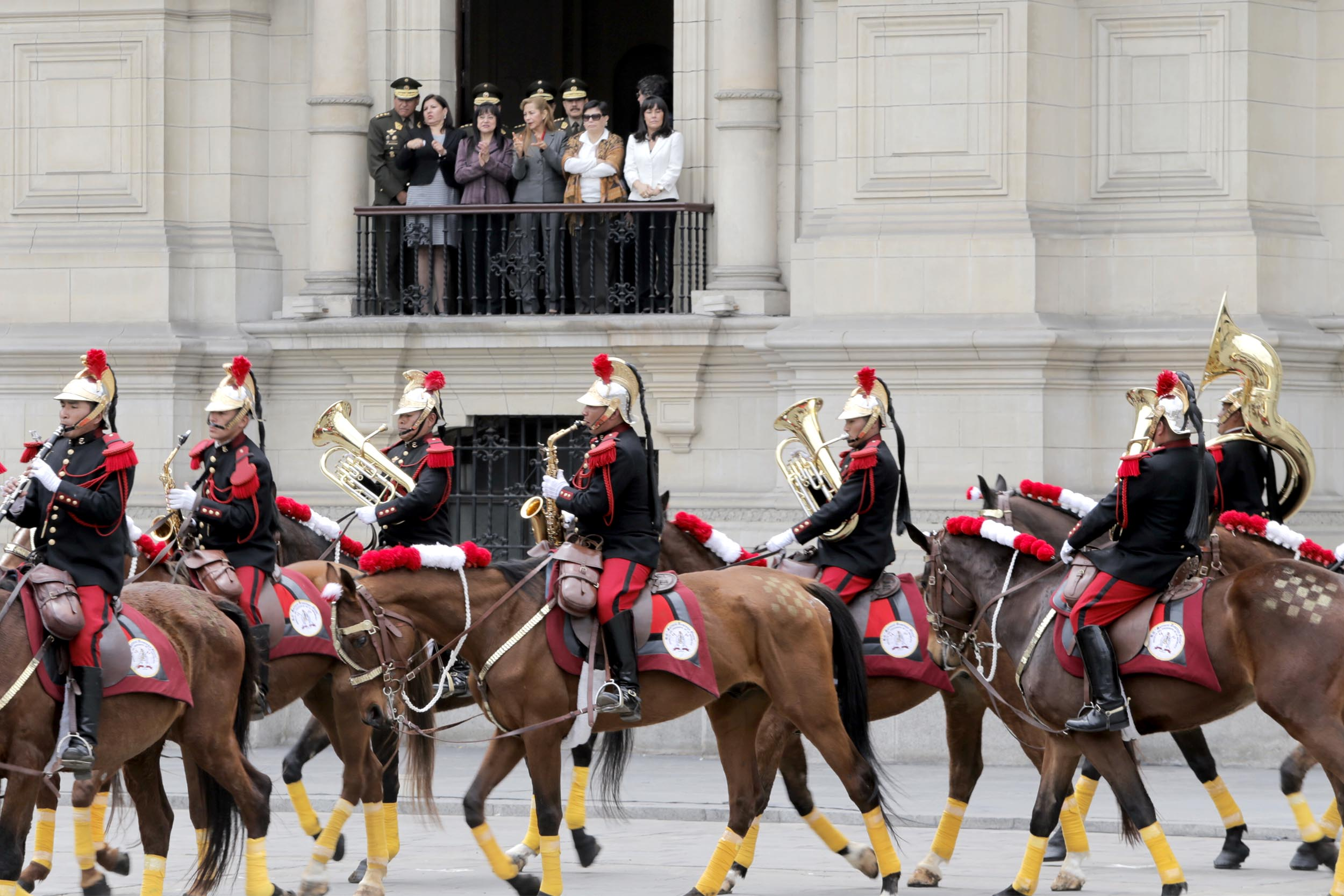
The regimental band of the Presidential Life Guard Dragoons Regiment is the only active mounted band in the Peruvian Armed Forces.

The Mounted Fanfare Band Company of the Presidential Life Guard Dragoons Regiment "Marshal Domingo Nieto" is today the only mounted band in active service within the Peruvian Armed Forces. It was established in 1905 along with the formation of the regiment, was disbanded in 1987 and remained inactive until 2012, when it was reactivated by Ollanta Humala, the President of Peru. It reports directly to the President as the official presidential mounted band with operational control under the commander of the 3rd Infantry Division (Army).

A small mounted fanfare band serves the Mounted Police Department of the National Police of Peru and traces its roots to the former 24th Cavalry Command of the Peruvian Civil Guard.

=== Portugal ===
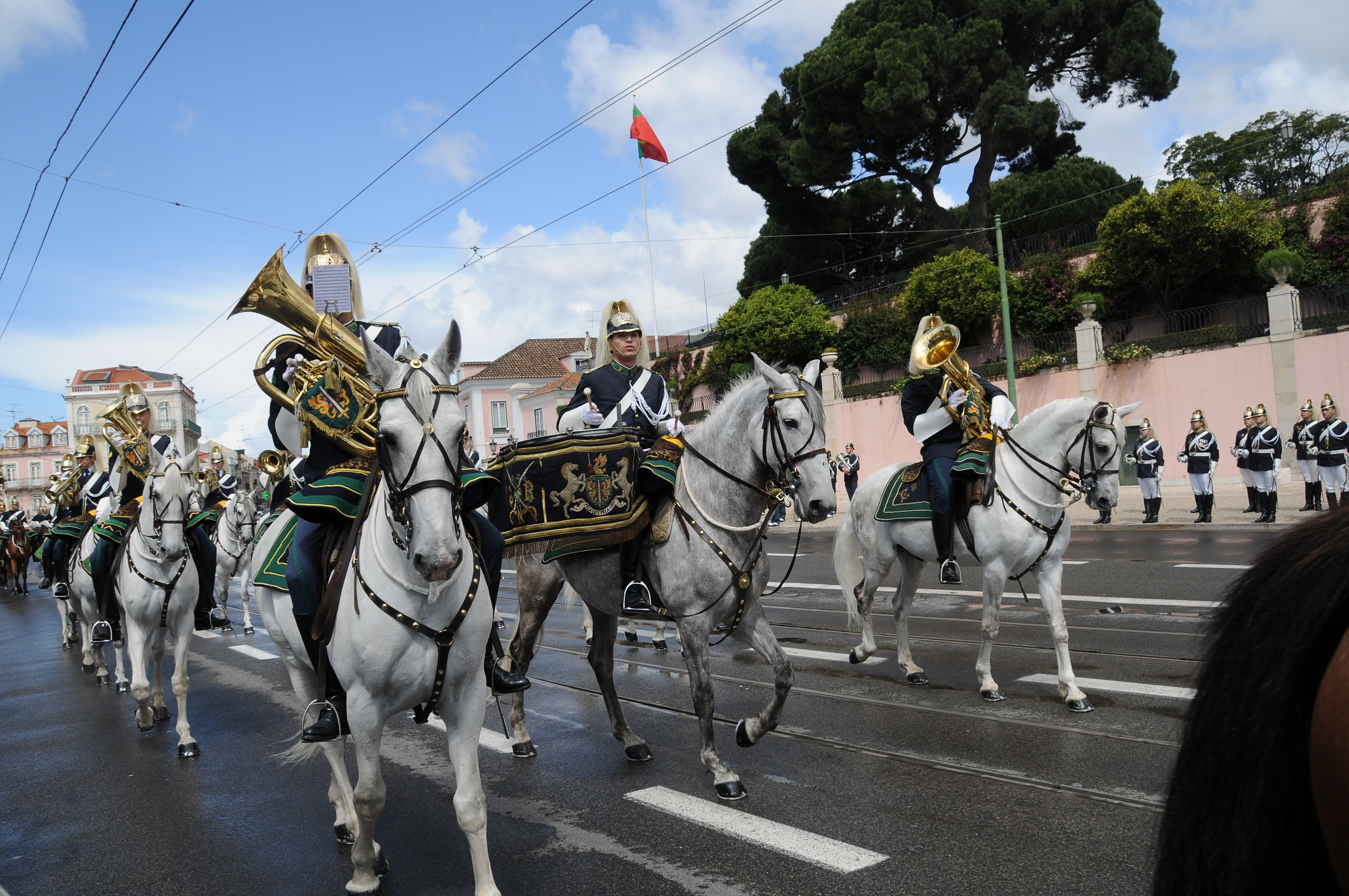
Charanga a Cavalo in the changing of the guard of the Portuguese Presidential Palace

The National Republican Guard (GNR) maintains a mounted band, known in Portuguese as the Charanga a Cavalo.

The Charanga a Cavalo is part of the State Honors and Security Unit (former GNR Cavalry Regiment) and usually parades with the horse squadrons of the GNR, including with Presidential Squadron in the guard mounting ceremony of the Presidencial Palace. This mounted band is the only band of its kind in the world that is able to play while galloping.

Unlike other bands, it is an all-brass ensemble similar in instrumentation to that of the French Republican Guard. Usually the band is joined by the pennant bearers of the GNR cavalry.

=== Russia ===
In Russia, Mounted Bands (Russian: конный оркестр) existed in the Red Army in the early twentieth century. Many cavalry units sported bands that were mounted and dismounted on horses. Their history dates back to the era of the Russian Empire, majority being all-brass following Imperial German precendence. In 1867, at a competition of European military bands in Paris, first place was taken by the Band of the Life Guards Cavalry Regiment. During the latter half of the Soviet Union, jubilee parades on Red Square in honor of October Revolution Day featured historical Bolshevik cavalry led by a mounted band with a drum major at the front.

In the Russian republic of Tuva, the Brass Band of the Government of Tuva, was created on 24 March 2008 by a student band under the Kyzyl Art College (originally founded in 1960). It is the only civilian mounted band in Russia, upholding the traditions of its predecessor, the Horse Brass Band of the Tuva People's Revolutionary Army, (active in the TPRA from 1929 to 1944). Their first performance during a Victory Day Parade in 2008, was enthusiastically received by the residents of Kyzyl. The band has been a participant in te Spasskaya Tower Military Music Festival and Tattoo in Moscow and the Capital City Day celebrations in Kazakhstan.

=== Senegal ===
The Red Guard of Senegal sports a mounted band which is the premier ceremonial unit of the unit's presidential protection group. The band, which consists of 35 musical cavalrymen, leads the Red guard in parades, on their white bay horses whose tails are dyed red. It is similar to the Republican Guard Mounted Band of France and closely follows the French mounted band tradition, which includes the tradition of a bugle major.

=== Spain ===
Only the Spanish Royal Guard and the Civil Guard retain mounted bands (Banda de caballeria), which are unique in this country that these are composed mainly of cavalry fanfare trumpets, which there are more similar in size to bugles but play differently owing to their historical role as signalling instruments for the cavalry and artillery in the Spanish Army and in the cavalry units of the Civil Guard and the current National Police Corps. For many years the Royal Guard's Royal Escort Squadron Mounted Band of Timpani and Bugles was the only band there that has the timpani as part of its instrumentation, and is led by a trumpet major, timpani were the primary signalling instruments used in the Gardes de Corps of Napoleonic times. This situation lasted until the 2020s, when the Civil Guard's Cavalry Squadron finally received timpani for its mounted band.

=== Sweden ===
The Royal Swedish Cavalry Band (Livgardets Dragonmusikkår (LDK) serves as the official mounted band in the Swedish Armed Forces. Currently, the LDK rides at the head of the Swedish Life Guards during the mounting the King's Guard, which parades through the capital. It is closely related to the Prussian/German tradition for mounted bands and is the common basis for mounted military bands in the Scandinavian Region. The LDK is the only band that still kept their musical traditions even during the Prussian reforms of the mid-1800s initiated by Wilhelm Friedrich Wieprecht. The LDK serves under the general command of the Swedish Armed Forces Music Corps. Unlike other bands it is led by a Drum Major, who uses the mace when mounted. The usual kettledrummers are positioned with their drum horses behind the drum major. All wear full dress and it is an all-brass unit.

=== United Kingdom ===
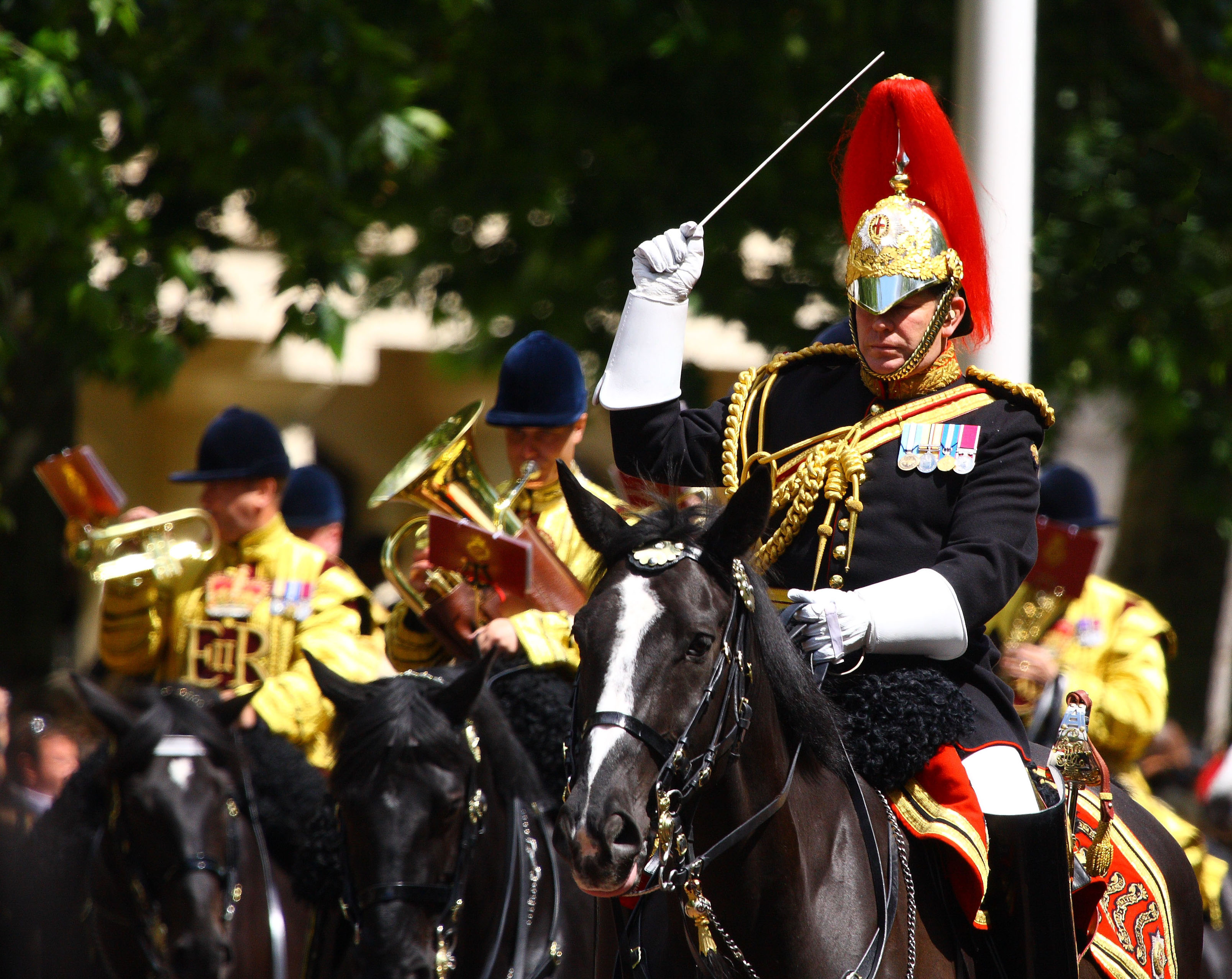
Major Tim Cooper, Director of Music of The Blues and Royals conducting the Mounted Band of The Blues and Royals.

Cavalry units and Royal Horse Artillery, like infantry battalions, maintained their own band in the United Kingdom. Until the 1930s, all cavalry regiments had a mounted band led by a drum horse. Similar to the Household Division, until 2014 both the Household Cavalry regiments had their own mounted bands and also their own regimental quick and slow marches, with the merger of the regimental bands to form a unified 64-strong Mounted Band of the Household Cavalry. The term "Massed Mounted Bands" denotes the combined mounted bands of the Household Cavalry.

The current Band of the Royal Armoured Corps is a descendant of the numerous line cavalry mounted bands that existed in the 19th century and in the first half of the 20th century.

=== United States ===
The United States Armed Forces does not currently have mounted bands in its ranks, but in the first 100 years of the country's existence, they were not uncommon. In the 1840s, establishing such bands was complicated and took multiple years to assemble from military ranks. This was partly due few band recruits knew how to ride a horse, and fewer still how to play a musical instrument. The original bands were composed of army buglers and trumpet players, with woodwind instruments and other brass instruments joining later. Mounted bands in the United States Army were ultimately disbanded in the '30s and '40s as mechanized vehicles such as tanks replaced horses. By the end of the Second World War, there were no ceremonial mounted bands left in the U.S.

In 2019, a military-styled civilian mounted band renewed the tradition in the US, as is happening in an ongoing revival in Germany. The Ohio-based 2nd Cavalry Brigade Band, made up of American Civil War re-enactors, played bugles and brass at its first public parade on May 29 and in 2022 completed a three day run, opening Fantasia at the Equine Affaire held in Columbus Ohio. Another civilian group, the Pendleton Roundup Mounted Band based in Oregon, wears uniforms based on the cowboy dress of the old western communities in the late 19th and early 20th centuries. This band includes more instruments including brass, woodwind and percussion.

=== Uruguay ===
The Regimental Band “Grito de Asencio” of the 1st Cavalry Regiment (Presidential Guards) “Blandengues de Artigas” of the Uruguayan Army is a mounted band following the Argentine practice, wearing the regiment's 19th century uniforms, but unlike its Argentine counterpart, also uses woodwinds. It is the official presidential band of the republic. Despite its mounted status, it can also perform with the regiment in dismounted formation.

== See also ==
- Cavalry
- Marching band
- Military band
- Police band (music)
- Fanfare band
- Corps of drums
- Drum and bugle corps (classic)
- Pipe band
