= Royal Guard of Oman =

- الحرس السلطاني العماني
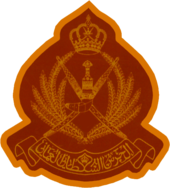
- The crest of the Royal Guard of Oman
- Founded: 1970
- Country: Oman
- Allegiance: Sultan of Oman
- Branch: Sultan's Armed Forces
- Type: Guard of honour Military band Royal guard
- Role: Anti-aircraft warfare Armoured warfare Close protection Close-quarters combat Counter-battery fire Counterterrorism; Covert operation Desert warfare Hostage rescue HUMINT; Maneuver warfare March; Raiding; Reconnaissance; Tactical emergency medical services Urban warfare
- Size: 4,500-5,000
- Garrison/HQ: Al Aman Barracks, Seeb, Muscat Governate
- Anniversaries: 1. November

Commanders
- Commander of the Royal Guard of Oman: Major General Khalifa bin Abdullah al Junaibi

The Sultan of Oman's Royal Standard, the standard's colours are reflected in the RGO's uniforms

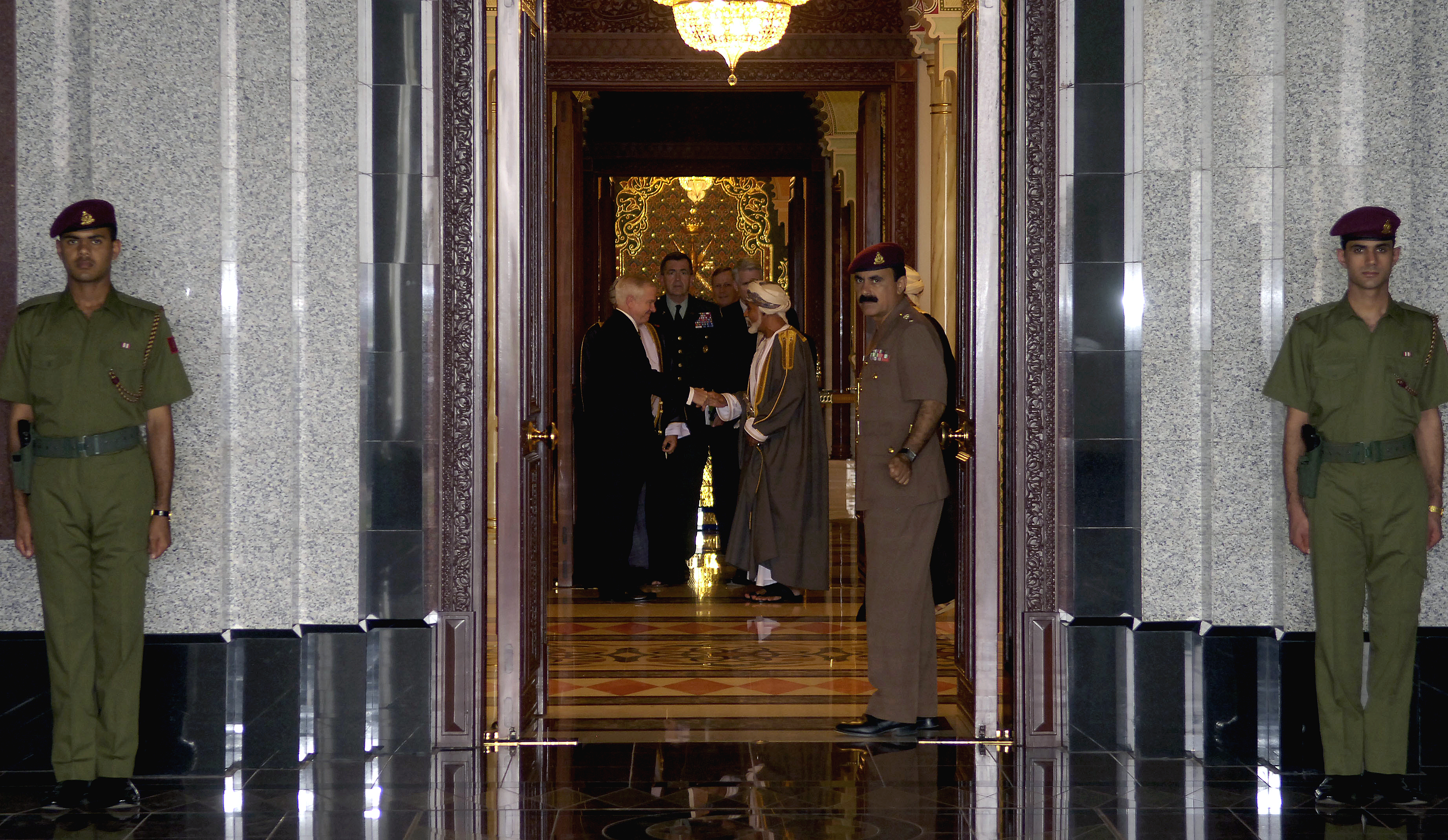
Royal Guards on duty at Al Baraka Palace

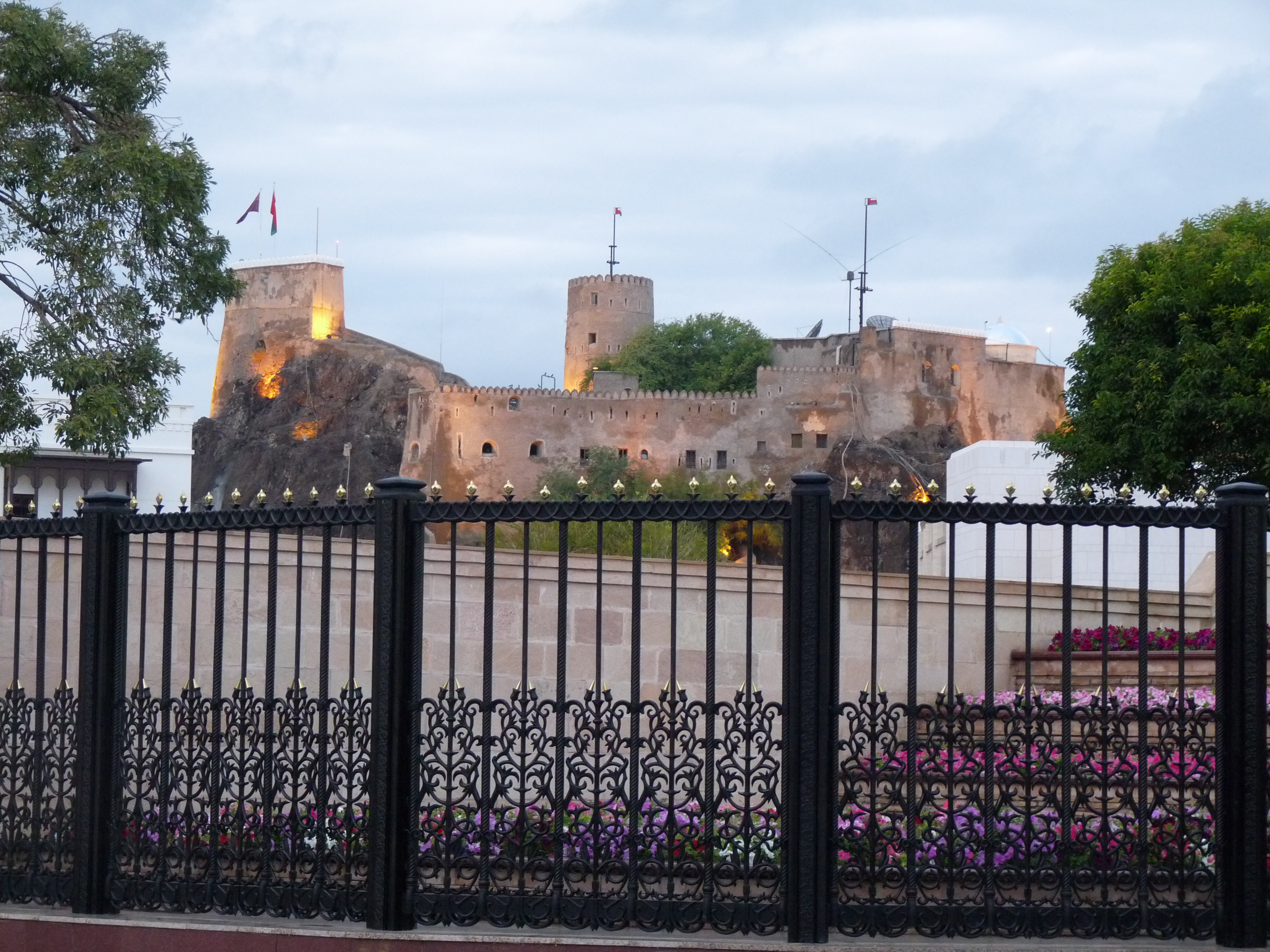
Fort Mirani in the background of the Al Alam Palace gardens

The Royal Guard of Oman (RGO) (Arabic: الحرس السلطاني العماني) is the royal guard of the Sultan of Oman. It is a separate service within the Sultan's Armed Forces (SAF) and although equipped to carry out land defense operations, it is not part of the Royal Army of Oman. The RGO is a personal security and ceremonial unit responsible for the protection of the Sultan and other senior members of the royal family.

There are two other Royal Household partner organizations which directly interface with the RGO, they are:

- The Oman Royal Yacht Squadron - based in Muscat Harbor with moorings for larger royal vessels in Muttrah's Port Sultan Qaboos
- The Royal Flight of Oman - based at Muscat International Airport

== History of the Force ==
The RGO can trace its history back to the small groups of lightly armed Askaris that guarded the palaces and forts of the Sultans of Oman, many habitually recruited from East Africa or loyal local tribesmen. However, it was His Majesty Sultan Qaboos bin Said that decided to develop a more structured approach to royal protection. The RGO originated from the Oman Gendarmerie, which in the early 1970s became His Majesty's Body Guard known as the Royal Guard Squadron. In 1975 the squadron developed into the Royal Guard Regiment and was responsible for the protection of His Majesty and his guests; and by default the security of royal residences (palaces, etc.) and the Sultan's travelling camps This unit was grown in size and evolved into the multi-function RGO of today.

== Organisation ==
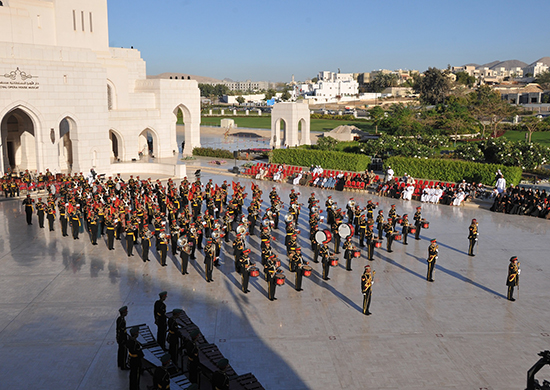
The military band

The RGO is organised as a light mixed capability brigade-sized formation of at least 4,500 but no more than 5,000 personnel. It is equipped with a variety of wheeled armoured and soft-skinned combat vehicles; as well as light and heavy support weapons. The RGO also has a ceremonial equestrian unit that is based at the Royal Stables at Seeb. The RGO's motorcycle VIP convoy escort specialists have also created a display team known as the Red Helmets. The RGO has ceremonial bands (including bagpipe bands) and a school of music. The RGO also administers the Royal Oman Symphony Orchestra and its own technical college, both based at separate sites in Seeb.

The following is the brigade's military structure:

- Headquarters Company
- Honour Guard Battalion
- RGO VIP Escort
  - Motorcycle Escort
  - Mounted Escort
  - Red Helmets
- Omani Royal Guard Military Band
  - Infantry Band
  - Royal Cavalry Mounted band
  - Jazz Band
  - Steel Band
  - Pipes and Drums
  - Symphonic Orchestra
  - School of Music
- Armoured Company
- Royal Guard of Oman Technical College

== Base locations ==
The following are some of the official residences of the Sultan and have a permanent RGO security presence:

- Al Alam Palace - the Sultan's ceremonial palace in Muscat - RGO personnel are billeted in the old Portuguese Fort Mirani adjacent to the palace
- Al Baraka Palace - the Sultan's primary residence in Seeb
- Al Hosn Palace - the Sultan's residence in Salalah
- Al Maamoura Palace - the Sultan's residence outside of Salalah
- Al Shomoukh Palace - the Sultan's residence in Manah
- Bahjat al Andhar Palace - the Sultan's residence in Sohar

Al Alam Camp and Halban Camp are two of the RGO bases in the Muscat area for when they are not deployed.

== Equipment ==
The RGO uses wheeled armoured fighting vehicles and is known to have:

- Nine Italian Centauro 120mm (8x8) Mobile Gun Systems. These AFVs replaced older French VBC-90 mobile gun systems in the RGO inventory
- 56 French Renault Véhicule de l'Avant Blindé (VAB) (6x6), including VPM-81 (81mm mortar carrier) and VDAA TA20 (anti aircraft) variants
- French Truck-mounted MBDA VL MICA missile Ground Based Air Defense system.
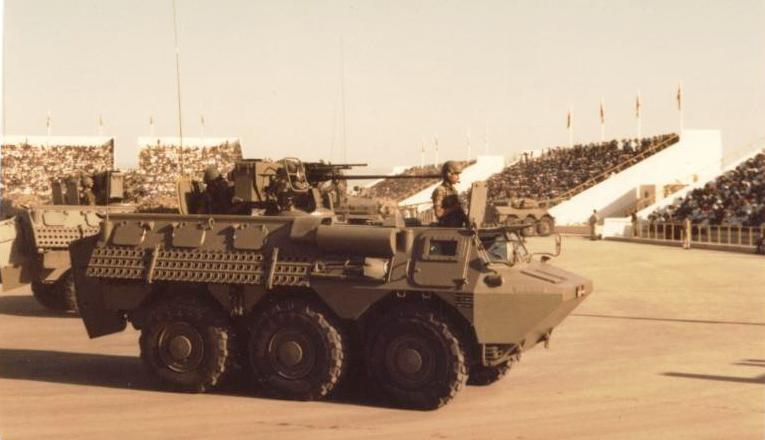
A Royal Guard of Oman (RGO) VDAA TA20 armoured anti-aircraft AFV on parade in 1981

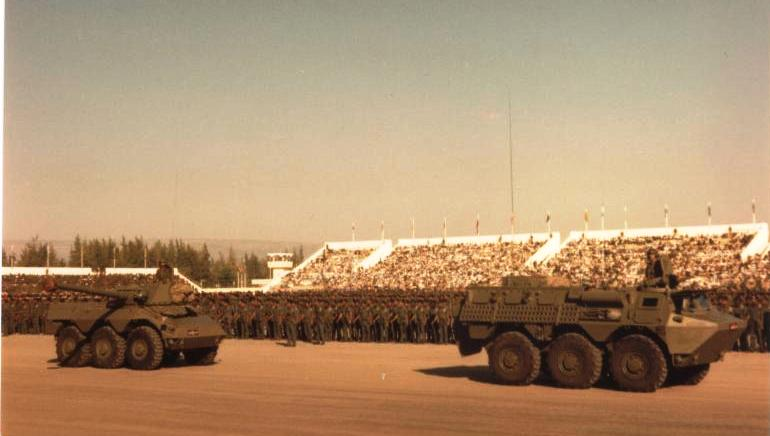
RGO VBC-90 (left) and RGO VAB (right) AFVs on a National Day Parade in 1981

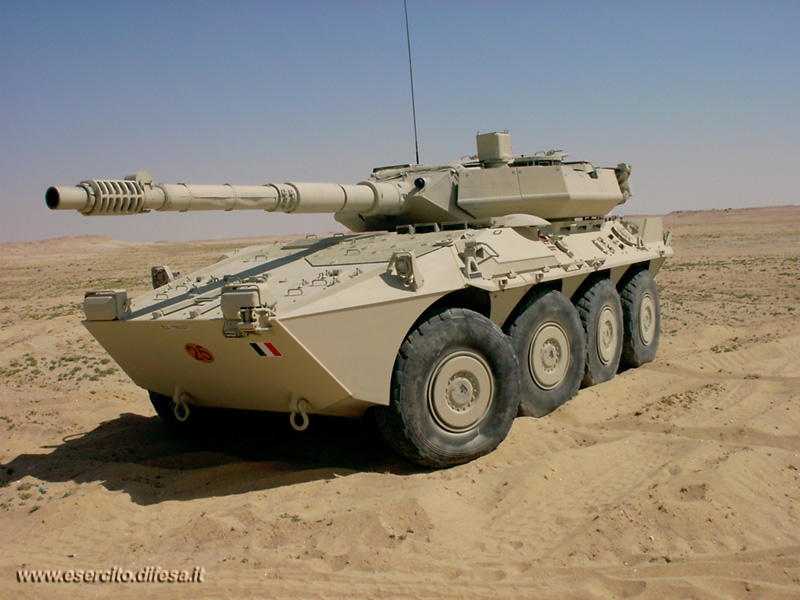
The Centauro Mobile Gun System (not an RGO vehicle in this image)

== See also ==
- Sultan of Oman's Armed Forces
- Royal Guard of Oman Technical College
