= VBC-90 =

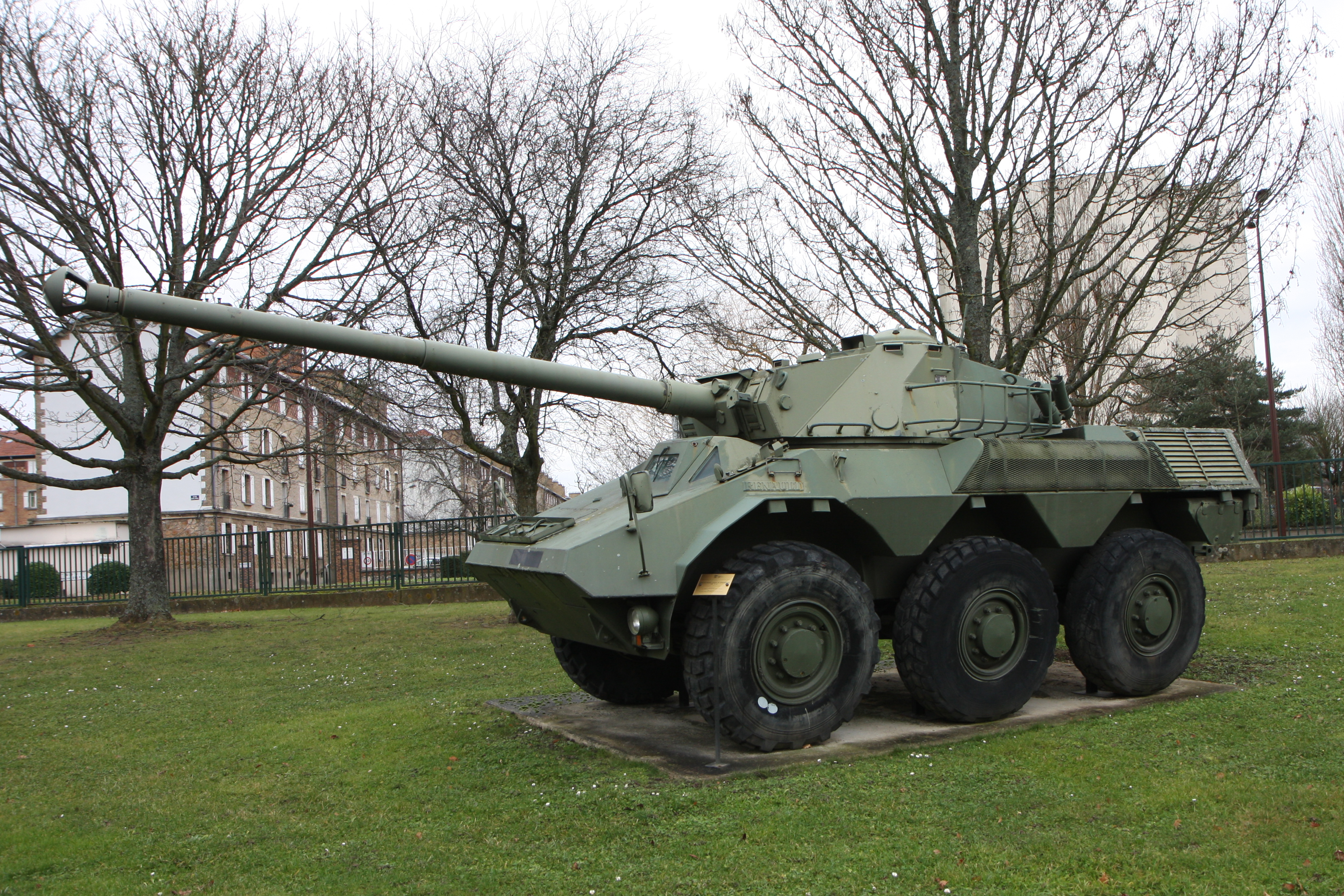
- Type: Armoured car
- Place of origin: France

Service history
- In service: 1981 – 2010
- Used by: See Operators

Production history
- Manufacturer: Renault Véhicules Industriels/Creusot-Loire
- No. built: 34

Specifications
- Mass: 13,500 kilograms (29,800 lb)
- Length: 8.135 m (26 ft 8.3 in) (gun forward); 5.63 m (18 ft 6 in)
- Width: 2.50 m (8 ft 2 in)
- Height: 2.552 m (8 ft 4.5 in)
- Crew: 3
- Armour: 6–8 mm
- Main armament: 90 mm rifled gun
- Secondary armament: 1× 7.62 mm coaxial machine gun 4× smoke dischargers
- Engine: Renault MIDS 06.20.45 6 cylinder water-cooler turbocharged diesel engine 220 hp (160 kW)
- Power/weight: 16 hp/tonne
- Suspension: 6x6 wheel
- Operational range: 1,000 km (620 mi)
- Maximum speed: 92 km/h (57 mph)

The Renault VBC-90 (Véhicule Blindé de Combat, or "Armoured Combat Vehicle") is a six-wheeled French armoured car carrying a 90mm high-velocity gun mated to a sophisticated fire control computer and ranging system. It was developed primarily for internal security or armed reconnaissance purposes. Modeled after Renault's Véhicule de l'Avant Blindé (VAB) armoured personnel carrier, the VBC-90 was engineered in concert with Saviem and Creusot-Loire. One was also built in prototype form by Argentina under license, where it was known as the Vehículos de Apoyo y Exploración. VBC variants were available with various hull configurations resembling those of the VAB and the Berliet VXB-170.

== Development History ==
The VBC-90 was developed by Renault and Saviem as a specialized reconnaissance and fire support variant of the Véhicule de l'Avant Blindé. It had a very wide turret ring and was manufactured specifically to carry a large-calibre gun system. At least two prototypes had been completed by 1979 and were initially designated VCS-90. The first two had boat-shaped hulls and glacis plates reminiscent of the VXB-170 and VAB, respectively. They essentially resembled six-wheeled variants of these vehicles, albeit with larger turret rings. The third had a more unique hull and a sloping glacis plate. It was this variant which was eventually accepted for production as the VBC-90.

Unlike the VAB, the VBC was not developed to meet a French Army requirement and was intended solely for export to French military clients overseas. Nevertheless, from 1981, the French government ordered 28 VBC-90s for a single squadron of the Mobile Gendarmerie, as a replacement for the ageing AMX-13 light tanks. These were delivered to the Gendarmerie between 1981 and 1984. VBCs produced by Renault for the Gendarmerie were designated VBC-90G. Another 6 were delivered to Oman between 1984 and 1985 along with a larger shipment of VABs for the Royal Omani Guard.

By 2016, Oman had retired the VBC-90 from service and replaced it with the much more heavily armed B1 Centauro. In France, the Mobile Gendarmerie relegated its VBC-90Gs to reserve storage in the early 2000s.

A simplified VBC-90 variant known as the Vehículos de Apoyo y Exploración (VAPE) was developed for Argentina by Renault. It was trialled alongside a much heavier model of the ERC 90 Sagaie offered by Panhard, but neither of the two were adopted by the Argentine Army.

In 2014, Lebanon was involved in negotiations to purchase the stored French VBC-90Gs. The deal was to be partly financed with military grants from Saudi Arabia, but was canceled in 2016 due to tensions between Lebanon and Saudi Arabia.

== Specifications ==
It has a steel hull armoured to protect against small arms fire. It has a crew of three, with the driver sitting at the front of the vehicle with three bullet-proof windows provided for the driver. A GIAT TS 90 turret carries the commander and gunner, and carries an armament of a 90 mm cannon with a co-axial 7.62 mm machine gun. 20 rounds of 90 mm ammunition are carried in the turret, with a further 25 rounds in the hull.

It is powered by a six-cylinder diesel engine mounted at the rear of the hull, driving a 6x6 drive. The vehicle is not amphibious, unlike the VAB on which it was based.

== Operators ==
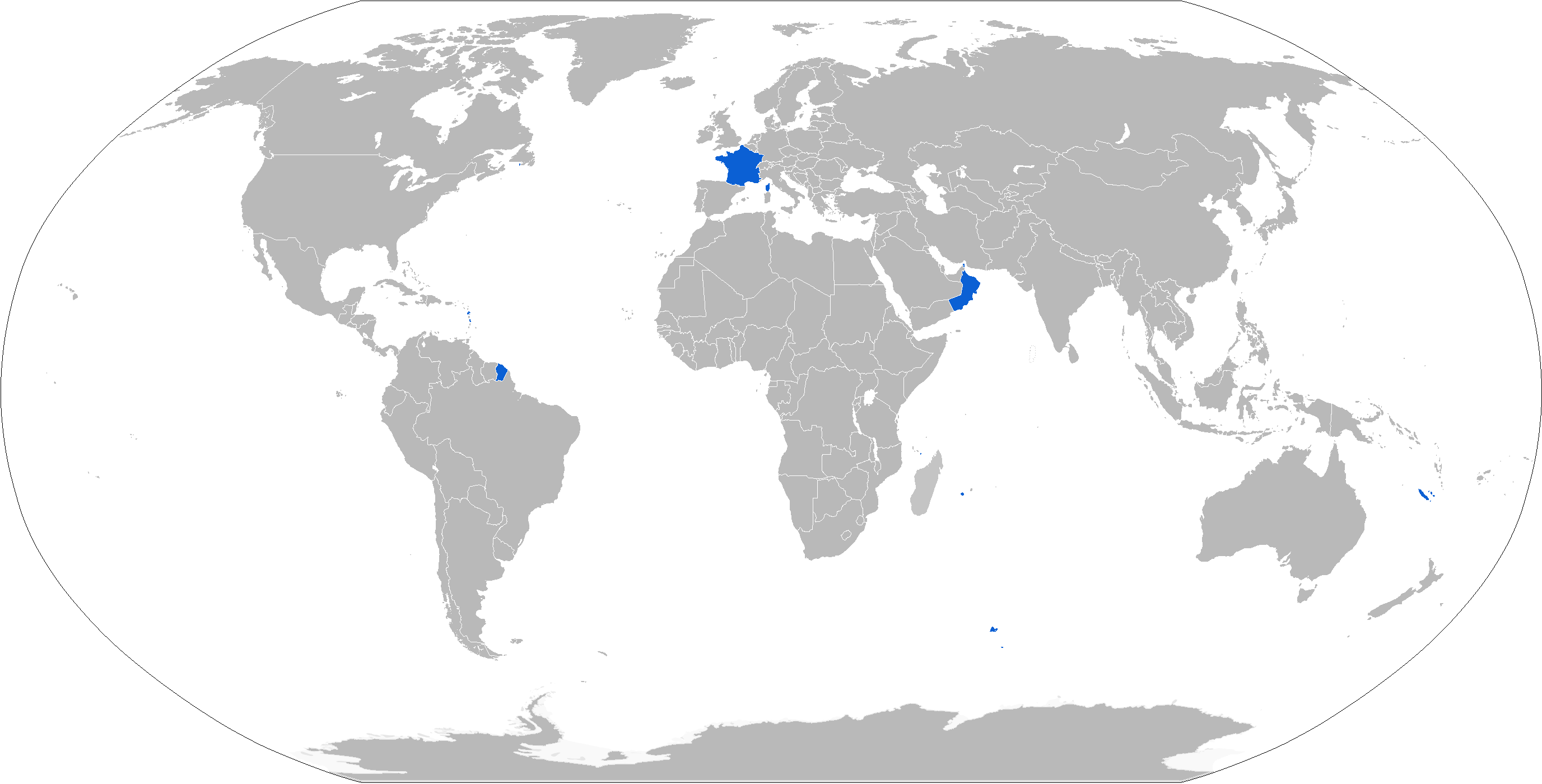
Map with VBC-90 operators in blue

=== Former operators ===
- Oman
- France

=== Potential operators ===
- Lebanon

== Gallery ==
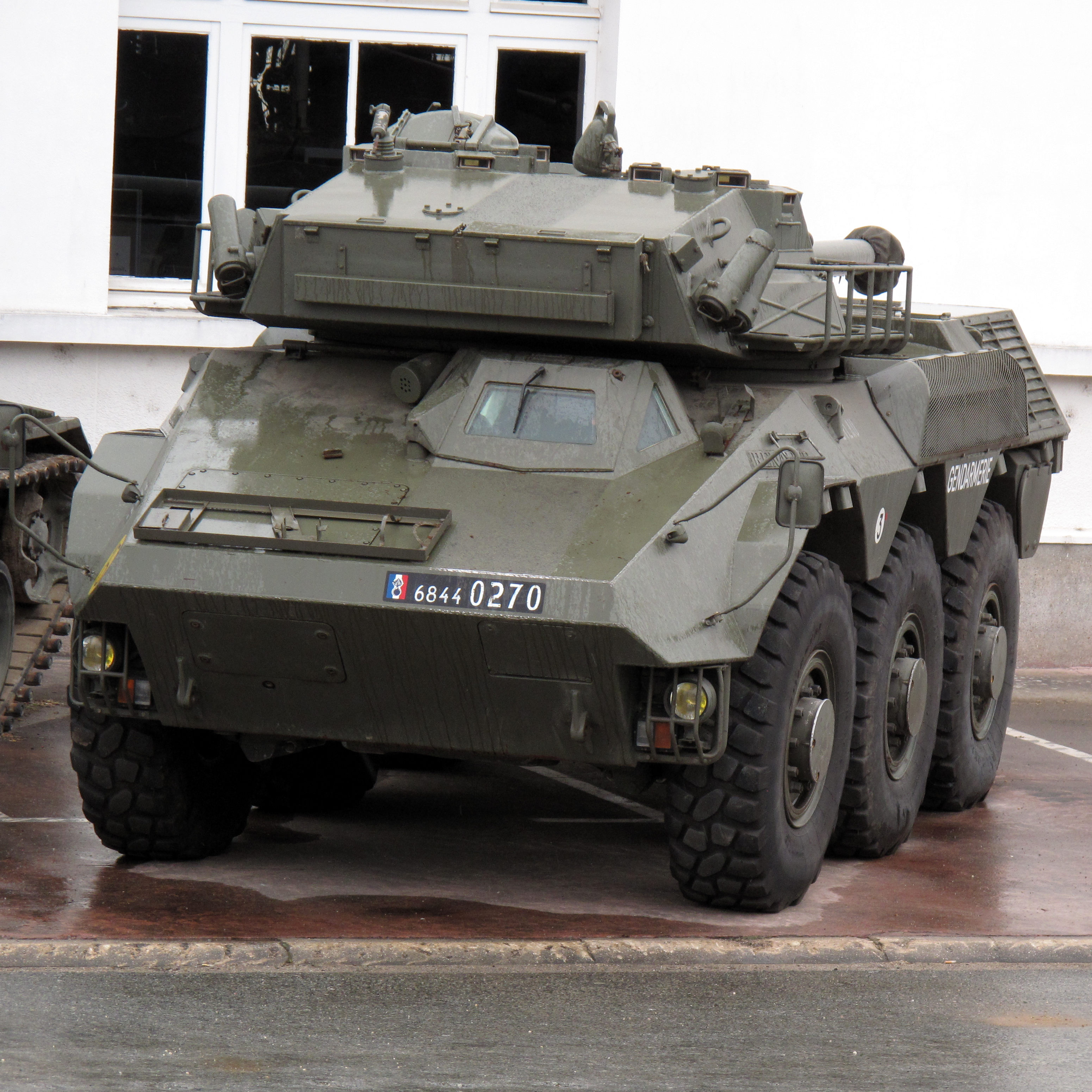

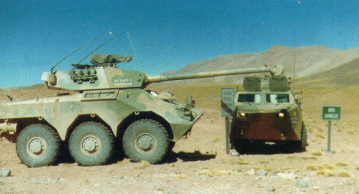

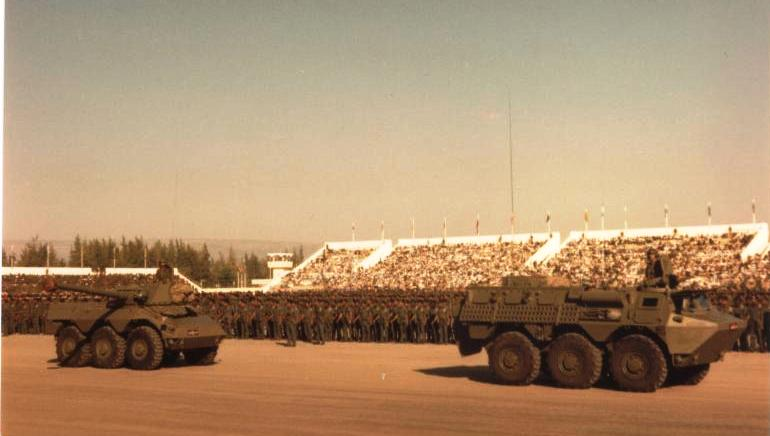
