= Royal Guard of Oman Technical College =

Royal Guard Of Oman Technical College كلية الحرس السلطاني العماني التقنية
- Type: Military/Technical junior college
- Established: 1976 as a School; 1997 as a College
- Director: Mr. Saud Al Busaidi
- Administrative staff: 45
- Students: 382
- Undergraduates: 2910
- Location: Seeb, Muscat, Oman
- Campus: Urban
- Colours: Crimson
- Affiliations: Royal Guard of Oman

Royal Guard Of Oman Technical College (RGOTC), is a public military and technical college in al Seeb in the governorate of Muscat in Oman, founded by Sultan Qaboos Al Saeed in 1976. The college is owned by the Royal Guard of Oman.

Since 1976, the intake of students has gradually increased from the initial 20 students to 50 students per year.

== See also ==
- List of schools in Oman
- List of universities in Oman
