= Royal Flight of Oman =

- Royal Standard of the Sultan of Oman
- Active: 1974; 52 years ago - present
- Country: Sultanate of Oman
- Allegiance: Oman
- Role: VIP Transport
- Part of: The Diwan of Royal Court Affairs
- Main operating base: Muscat International Airport (MCT/OOMS)
- Paint scheme on fixed wing aircraft: All over white with red and green cheatline with national flag on tail fin
- ICAO and IATA Codes: ORF and RS

Commanders
- Commander of His Majesty’s Royal Flight Oman: Captain Suleiman Bin Harith al Barashdi (since 2010)

Aircraft flown
- Transport: Airbus A319 & A320, Boeing 747, Gulfstream 550 & VIP helicopters

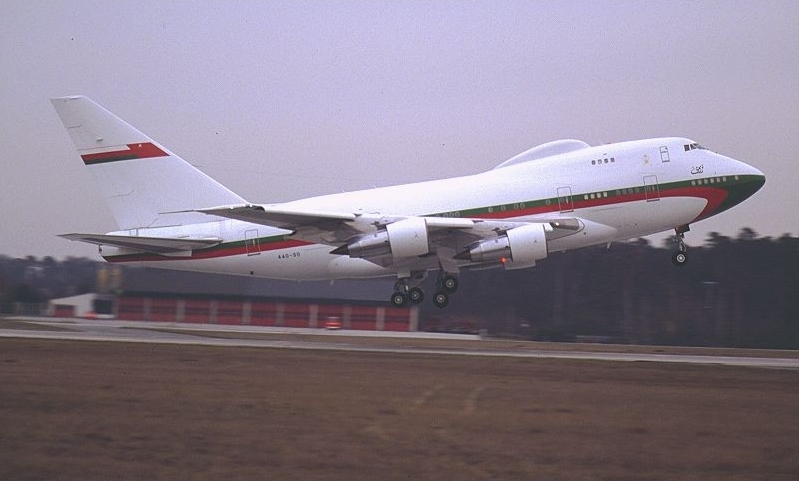
Boeing 747 SP27, with the SATCOM bulge on top of fuselage.

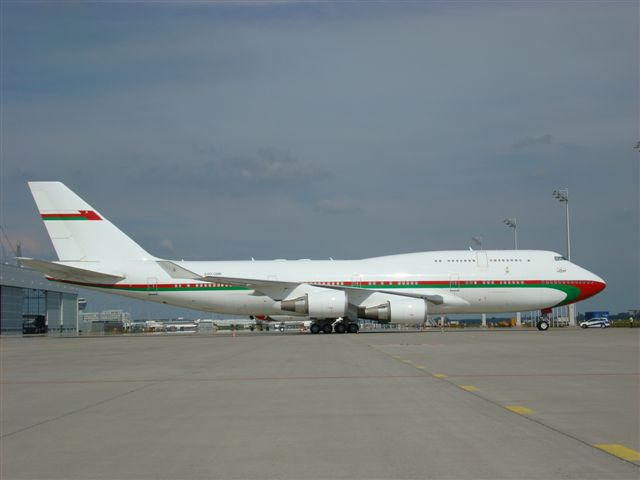
Boeing 747 430.

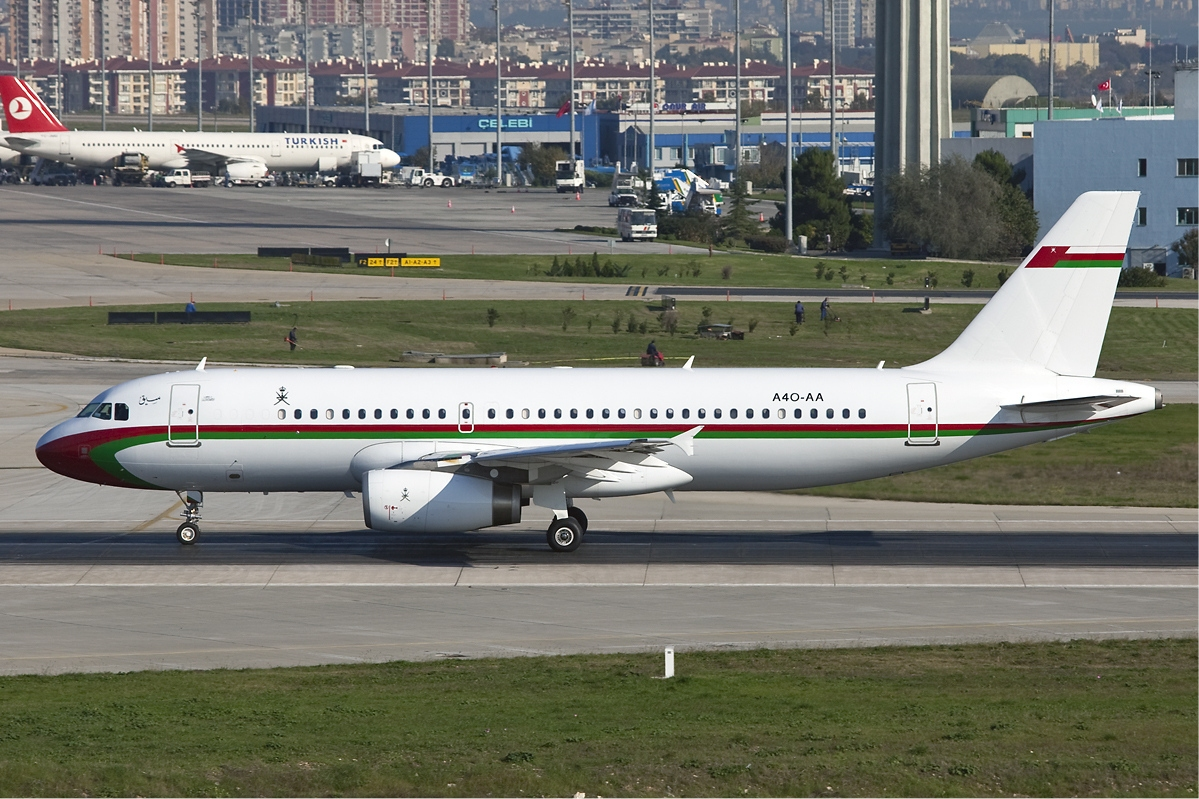
Airbus A320.

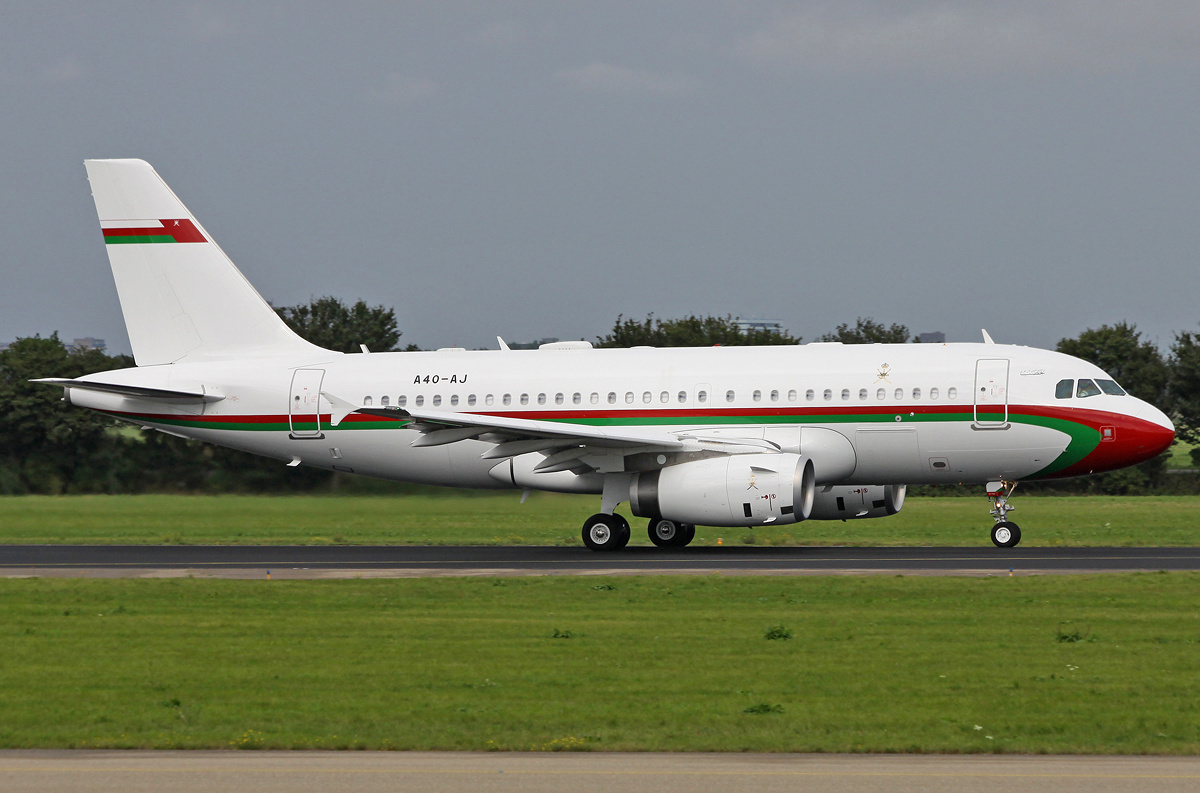
Airbus A319.

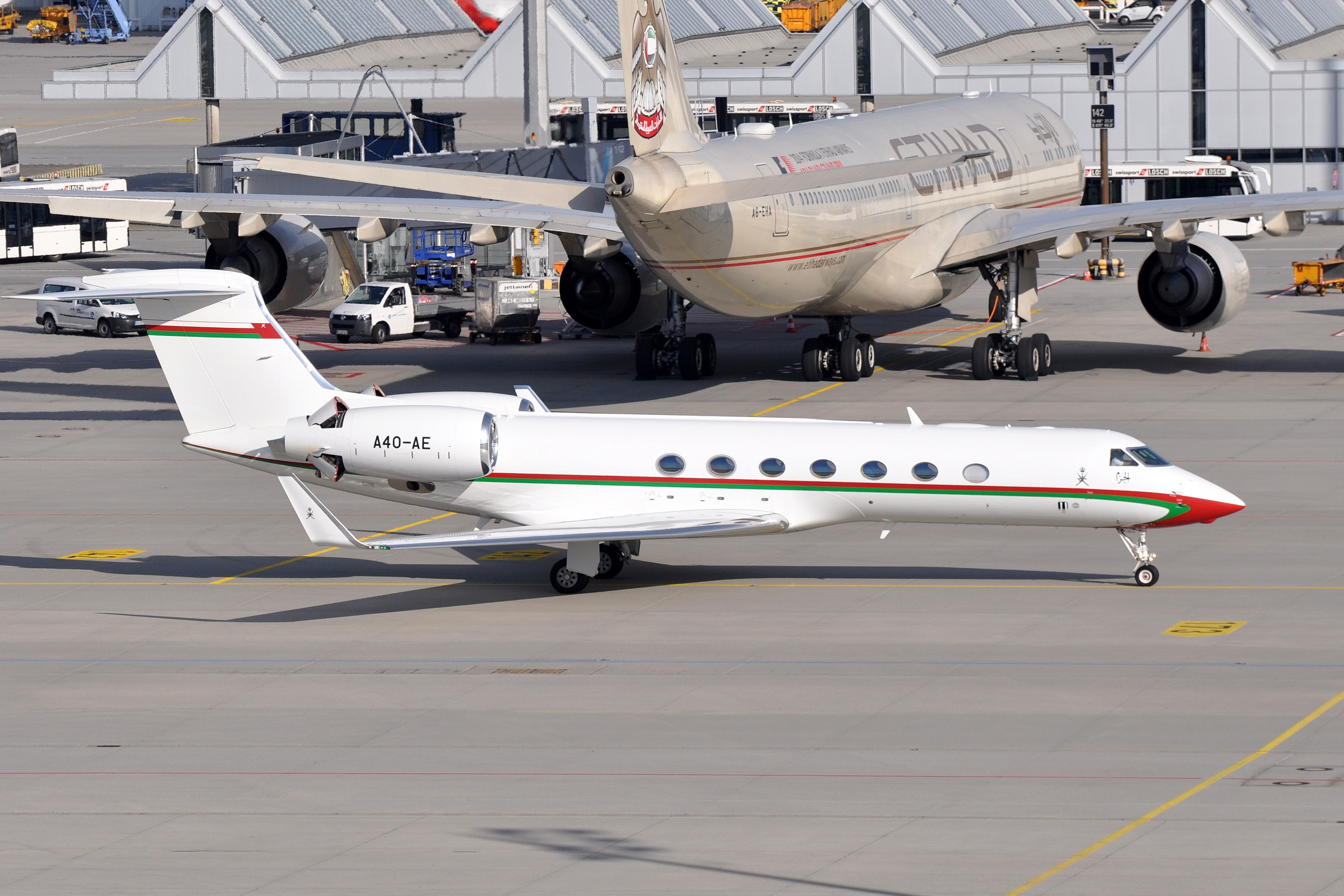
One of the RFO's Gulfstream 550s (A40-AE/Al Hazim).

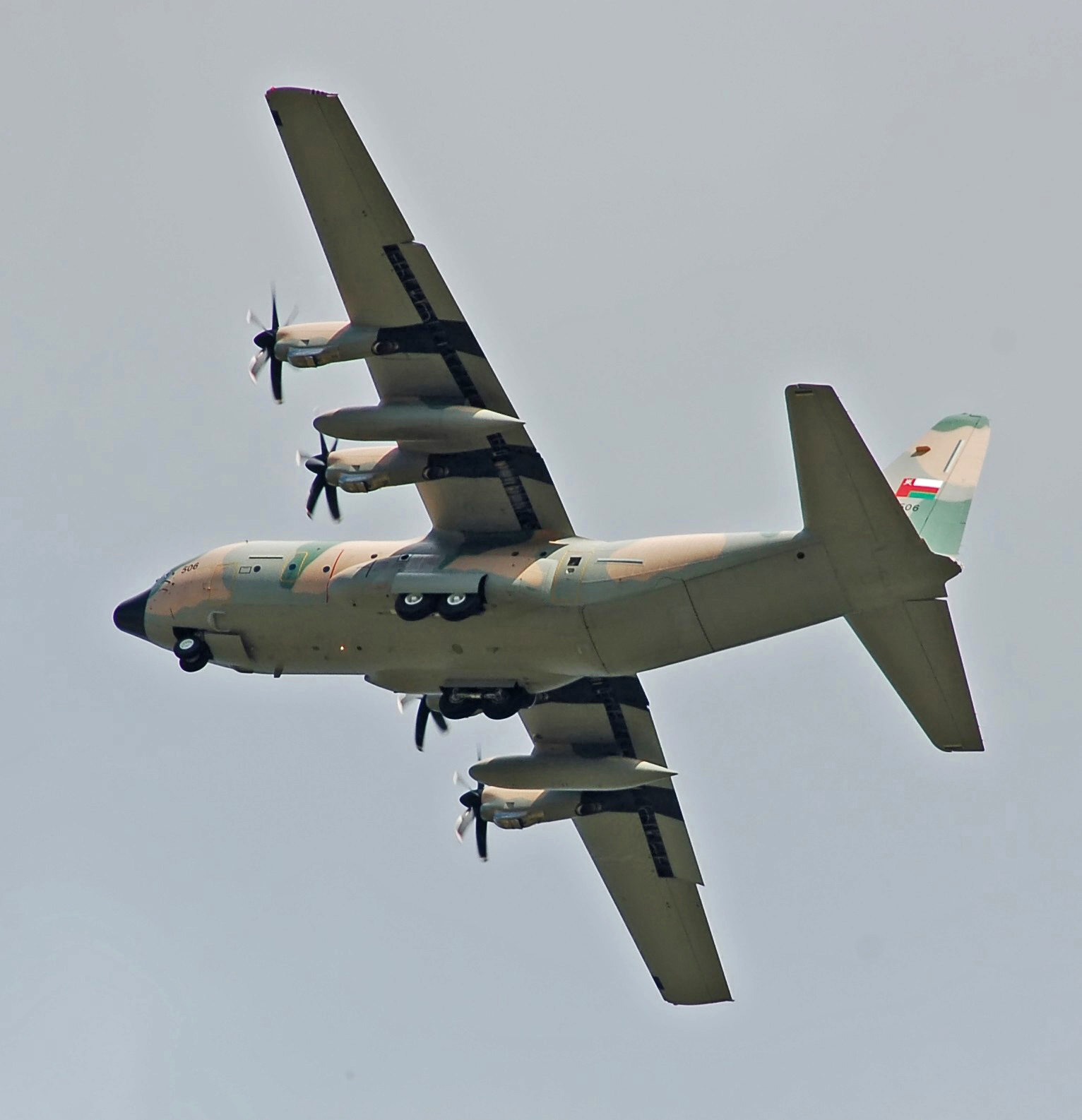
C-130J (this is a RAFO air frame - one of three C-130Js delivered to Oman).

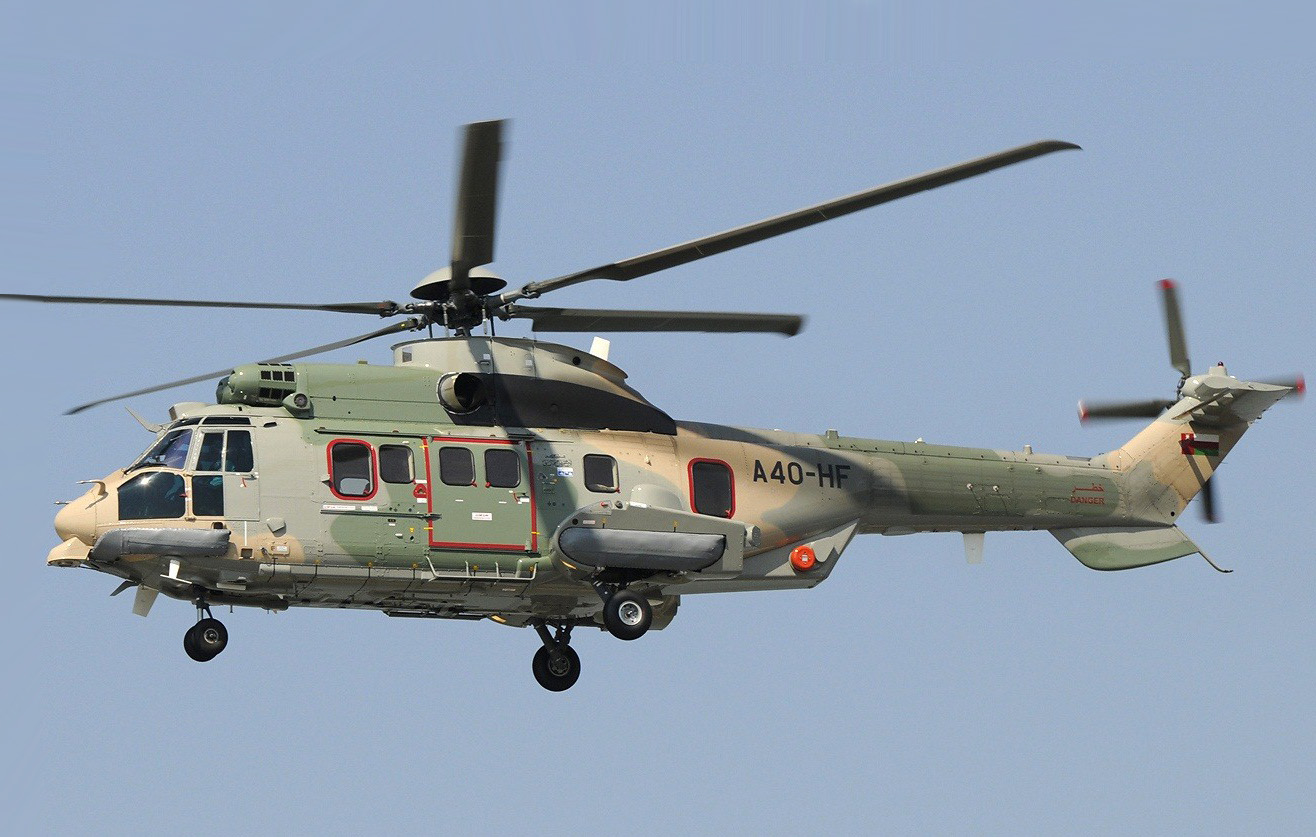
Super Puma II.

The Royal Flight of Oman (RFO) is the VIP air transport capability embedded within the Sultan of Oman's Royal Household. The Royal Flight is not a military organisation, but rather part of the Diwan of Royal Court Affairs; it is not part of the Royal Guard of Oman.

The RFO was formed in 1974 and started with a few fixed wing aircraft, rotary wing aircraft were added in 1975.

The RFO has its own staff housing and welfare complex (including a club and an international school) on Al Matar Street near Muscat International Airport.

== Bases ==
The RFO has one permanent operating base and a secondary base:

- Muscat International Airport - in a segregated and separately secured VIP terminal and hangar area
- Salalah International Airport - is used regularly and there is a segregated and separately secured VIP terminal supporting RFO activities.

RFO aircraft will also make use of Omani regional airports and RAFO airbases as necessary.

== Current inventory ==
The RFO operates the following aircraft types:

Aircraft	Origin	Type	Variant	Numbers	Registration/Nickname	Notes
Passenger Jet Aircraft
Boeing 747SP	USA	VIP Transport	SP27	1	A4O-SO/Sohar	Delivered 02/07/1984
Boeing 747-400	USA	VIP Transport	430	1	A4O-OMN/Sohar	Delivered 30/04/2004
Boeing 747-8	USA	VIP Transport	747-8	1	A4O-HMS/Nizwa	Delivered 2012
Airbus A319	Germany	VIP Transport	133 CJ	1	A4O-AJ/Khasab	Delivered Feb 2013
Airbus A320	France	VIP Transport	233	1	A4O-AA/Saiq	Delivered Dec 2005
General Dynamics Gulfstream G550	USA	VIP Transport	G550	2	A4O-AD/Masirah A4O-AE/Al Hazim	Delivered Jul 2011
Transport Aircraft
Lockheed Martin C-130 Super Hercules	USA	Medium lift transport	J variant	1	525	Delivered 2012
Passenger Rotary Wing Aircraft
Eurocopter EC225 Super Puma II	France	VIP Transport	EC225LP	6	A4O-HD, A4O-HE, A4O-HF A4O-HMA, A4O-HMB, A4O-HMC	Delivered 2007
Eurocopter AS550 Fennec	France	VIP Transport	AS550C3	3	07, 08, & 09	Delivered 2005
