= Maʽmurah =

- Village
- Location in Oman
- Coordinates: 17°03′42″N 54°13′55″E
- Country: Oman
- Governorate: Dhofar Governorate
- Time zone: UTC+4 (Oman Standard Time)

Maʽmurah (معمورہ) is a village in Dhofar Governorate, in southwestern Oman. It is the location of the Sultan of Oman's Al Maamoura Palace.
