= Mounted Band of the Household Cavalry =

British mounted band (2014-)

Mounted Band of The Household Cavalry
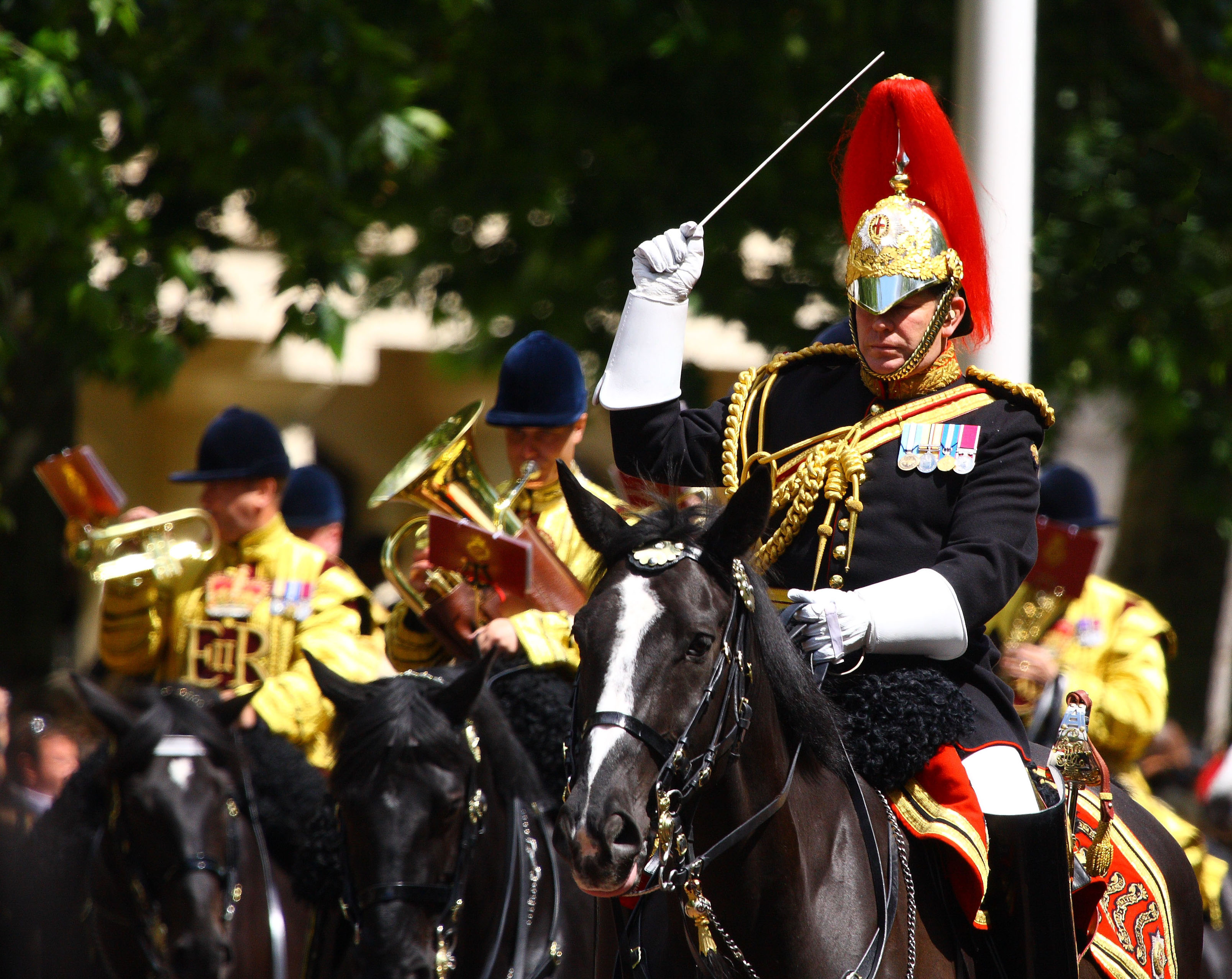
- Major Tim Cooper, Director of Music of The Blues and Royals conducting the Massed Bands of the Household Cavalry.

Background information
- Also known as: HCMR Band
- Origin: London, United Kingdom
- Years active: 2014-Present
- Website: Bands of the Household Division

The Mounted Band of the Household Cavalry is a British Army band which ceremonially serves the Household Cavalry Mounted Regiment (HCMR). The HCMR Band is the largest symphonic wind band in the British Army. It is one of the bands of the Royal Corps of Army Music (RCAM) and is currently based at Hyde Park Barracks and Combermere Barracks.

== Origins ==
=== Band of The Life Guards ===
In the years since the dissolution of the Commonwealth of England, music had become very important to the ceremonial duties of the regiment, which each Troop of the Guards having a fanfare team consisting of one kettledrummer and four trumpeters. The trumpets and drums were silver, crimson, and gold, with the Royal Coat of Arms engraved on it. At that time, the horses they mounted were of a black Clydesdale horses.

=== Band of The Blues and Royals ===
It originates from the Band of the Royal Horse Guards which was founded in 1805. On St George's Day that year, King George III presented the band with a set of silver kettledrums, and appointed Herr Stowasser as the first bandmaster of the Regiment. In 1938, the band made an appeared in the movie The Drum where they performed in kilts for the first time in their history. The band went through an amalgamation in 1969 to form the Band of the Blues and Royals which was founded in the same year.

=== Merger ===
In September 2014, the Bands of The Life Guards and The Blues and Royals were merged to form the combined Mounted Band of the Household Cavalry composed of 64 musicians from the two bands. The band wear the uniform of both The Life Guards and The Blues and Royals on service events and the State Dress on major holidays and occasions.

== Regimental music ==
- The Life Guards:
  - Quick - Millanollo
  - Slow - Life Guards Slow March
  - Trot Past - Keel Row
- The Blues and Royals:
  - Quick - Quick March of The Blues and Royals
  - Slow - Slow March of The Blues and Royals
  - Trot Past - Keel Row

== Events ==
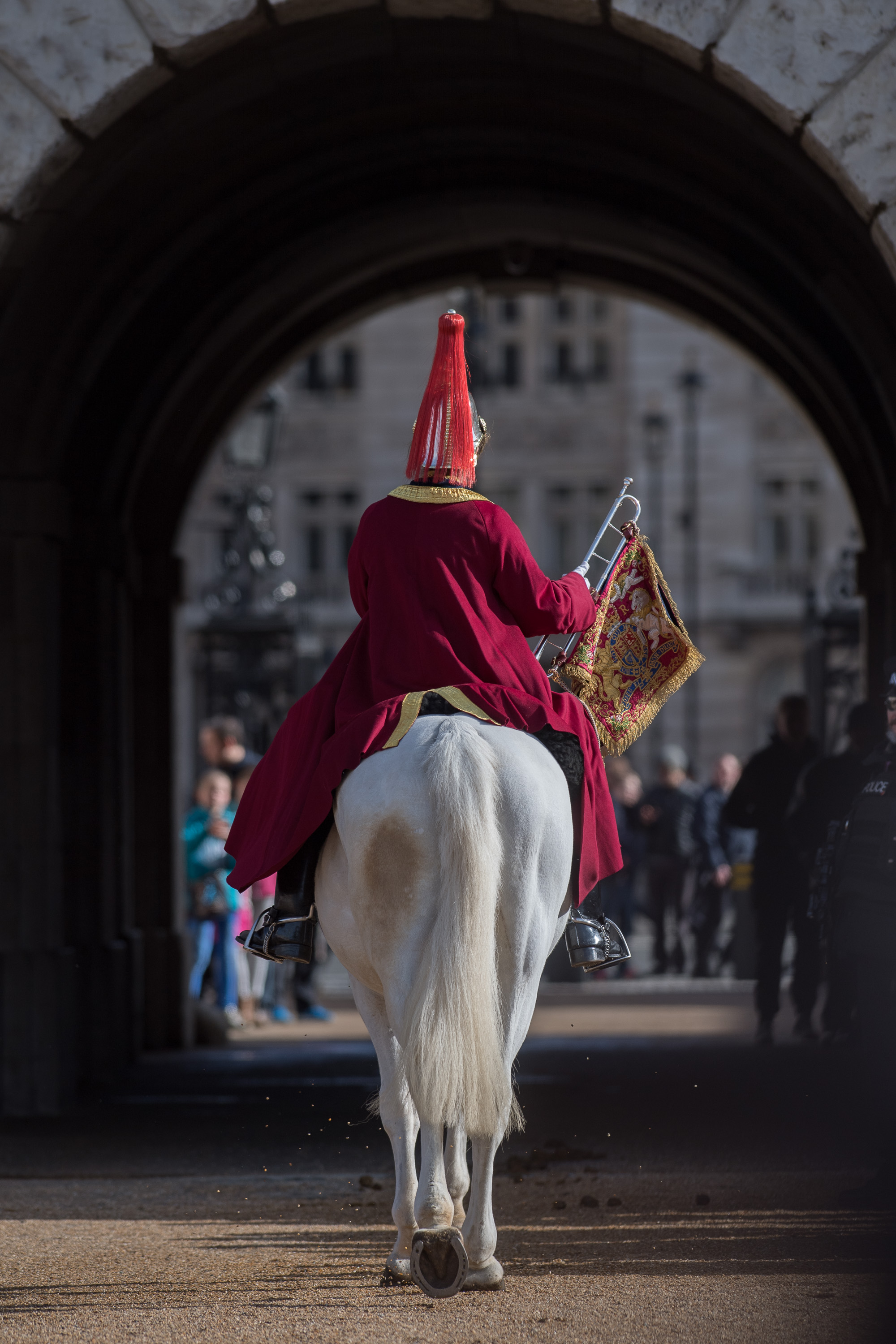
A trumpeter of the Band of The Household Cavalry.

The two 35 member mounted bands of the combined massed bands of the HCMR Band regularly perform at special occasions and events. Some of the main and most notable events they participate in are listed below, although this is not a comprehensive list:

- Mounting of the King's Life Guard
- State and official visits to the United Kingdom
- The Festival of Remembrance
- Trooping the Colour
- Beating Retreat
- State Procession at the State Opening of Parliament
- Lord Mayor's Show
- Coronation of the British monarch

Since 2014, the HCMR Band has performed in many other public events, such as the Sweden International Tattoo, as well as the Birmingham International Tattoo.

== Uniform ==
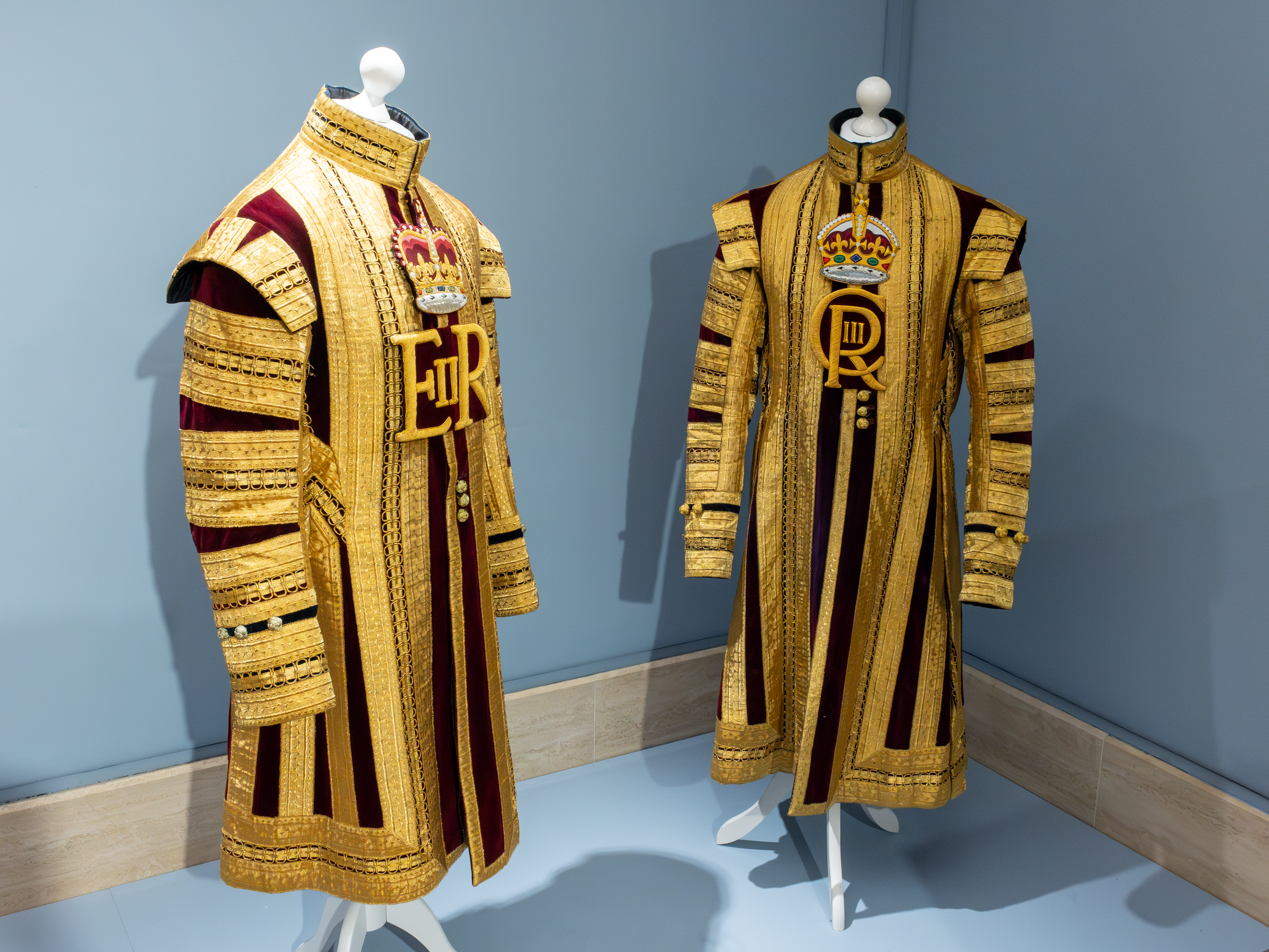
State dress coats of the State Trumpeters bearing the royal cyphers of Elizabeth II and Charles III

The HCMR Band mostly wears three ceremonial dress uniforms:

- The mounted band's main uniform is known as the state dress (unchanged since 1685) which consists of a gold state uniform and dark blue peaked equestrian caps. The state dress is only worn if a member of the British royal family is present, as for example on the Monarch's Birthday Parade (Trooping the Colour), but not on the two Trooping the Colour's rehearsals, the Major General's Review and the Colonel's Review. An often overlooked detail on the state dress is a pair of vestigial false sleeves, now in form of narrow strips hanging from the back of the shoulder and looped up into the waist-belt. False sleeves were a traditional embellishment of the uniforms of British Army drummers and pipers (who were also, in non-royal regiments, clad in reverse colours) which were abolished in 1768.
- The main uniform of The Life Guards consists of a scarlet coat with a silver lace. It originates from a similar uniform created in 1678.
- On ceremonial occasions, The Blues and Royals wear a blue tunic (inherited from the Royal Horse Guards, also known as "the Blues"), with an Eagle arm patch inherited from the 1st The Royal Dragoons, and a metal cuirass, and a matching helmet with a red plume worn unbound.

== State Trumpeters and Drummers ==
The HCMR Band often provides State Trumpeters for ceremonial events of state. The HCMR Band, specifically when denoted as the "Massed Mounted Bands" on parade, is led by two musicians on Shire horses who are playing the timpani. They steer the reins of the drum horses with their feet, due to their hands being occupied with the drumsticks. A drum horse must have a minimum of 68 inches in order to be used in this regard. They also have to have the capability to carry two silver drums weighing 112 kilograms (247 lb) combined.

== Notable members ==
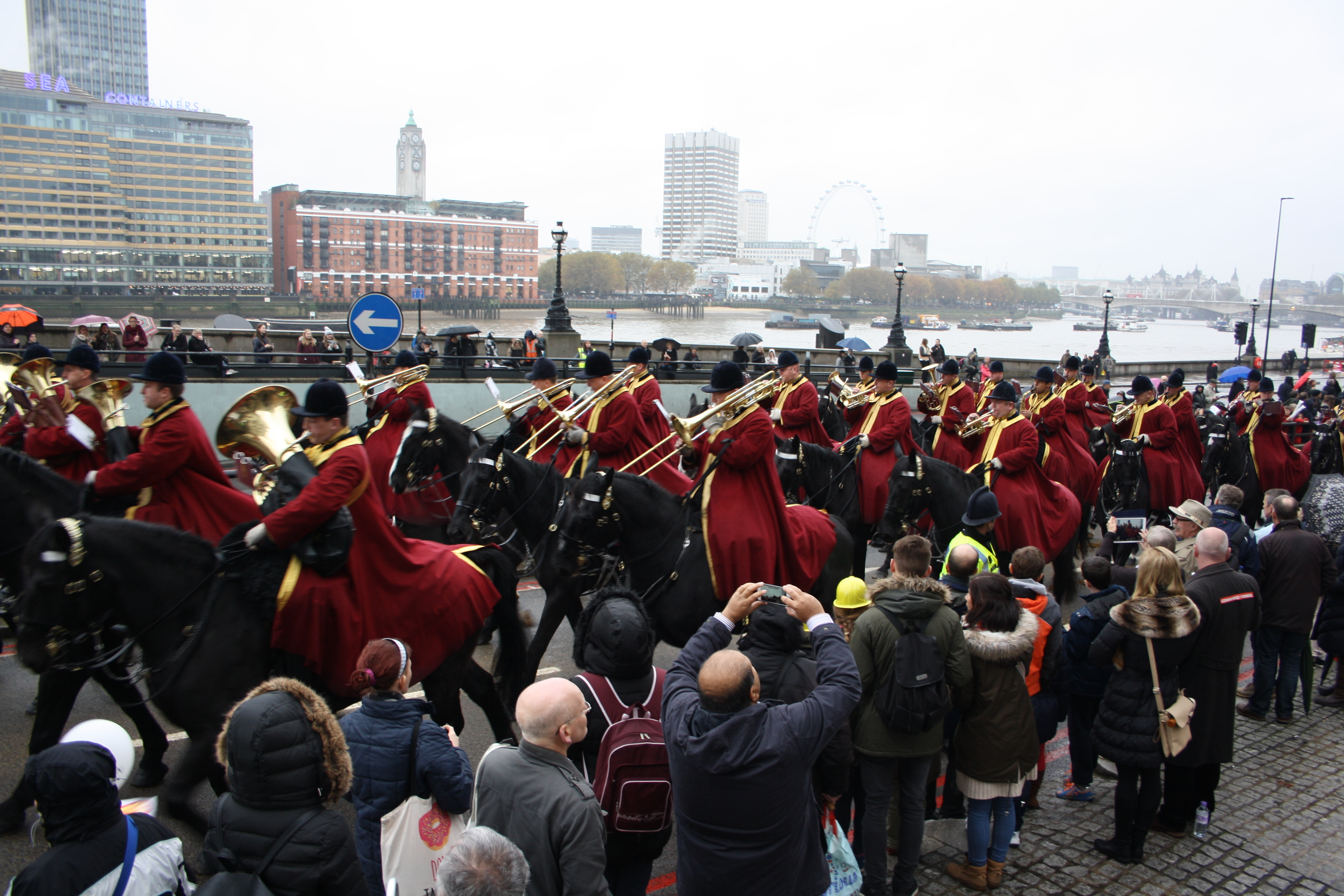
The HCMR Band at the 2016 Lord Mayor's Show.

- Major Jason Griffiths - Director of the Band of The Blues and Royals
- Captain J. Cooper - Member of the Band of The Life Guards and founder of the Nigerian Army Band Corps
- Warrant Officer Class 1 Esther Freeborn - First female bandmaster of the HCMR Band
- Herr Stowasser - First Bandmaster of the Band of The Blues and Royals
- James Tutton - Bandmaster of the Band of The Blues and Royals and one of the founders of the Society of British Musicians
- Richard Jones - Magician and soldier known for winning the tenth series of Britain's Got Talent in 2016.

== Drum horses ==
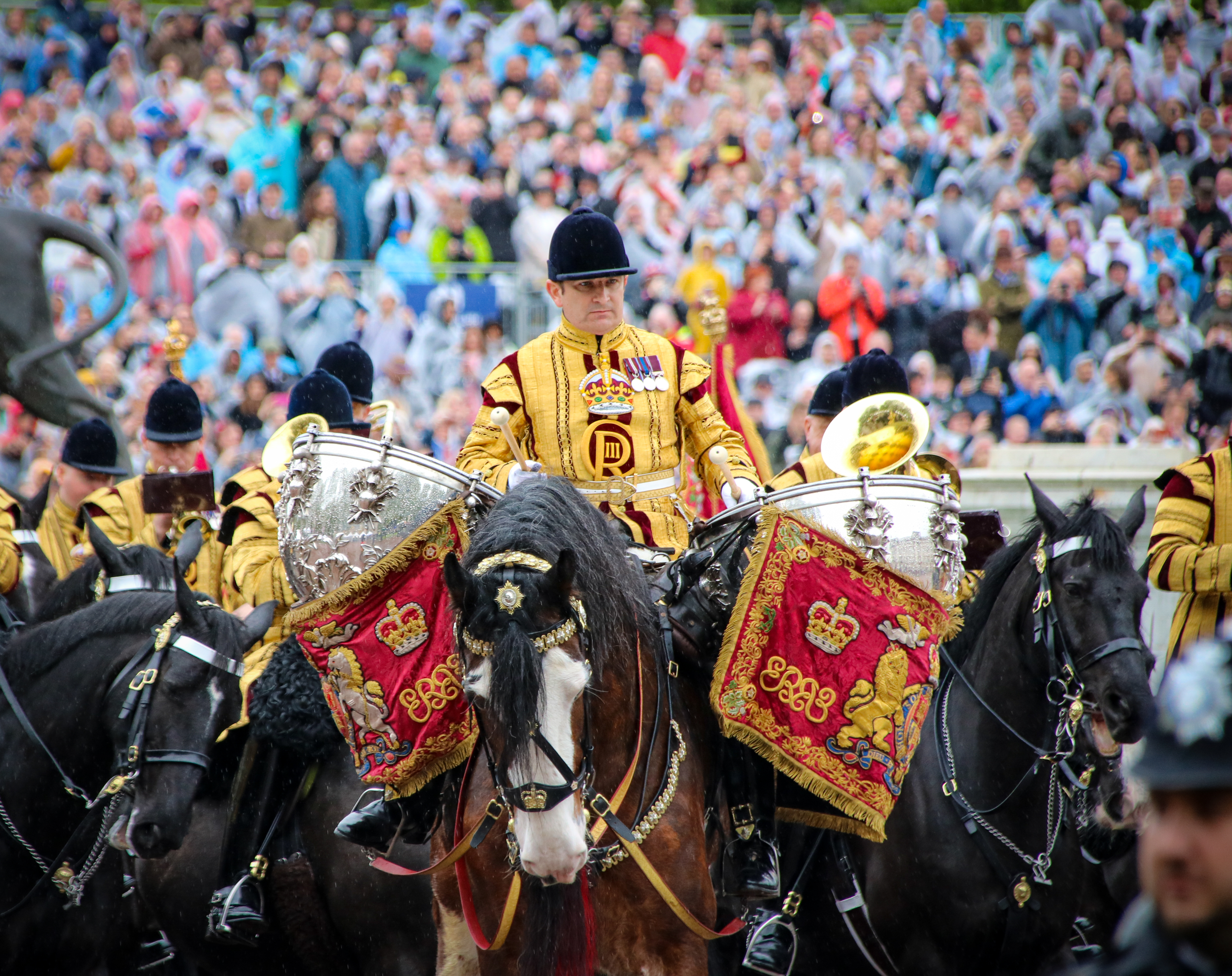
Drum horse Major Atlas leading the procession to Buckingham Palace for the Coronation of Charles III and Camilla

Drum horses lead the Mounted Band of the Household Cavalry. They are large heavy horses of full or part-bred Shire or Clydesdale breeds. Drum horses hold the rank of major and the monarch assigns their official name from classical mythology. Earlier drum horses have been named Hector, Leonidas, Janus, Spartacus, Constantine, Horatius and Mercury—those in service as of 2023 are Perseus, Atlas, Apollo and Juno.

The horses need to have a calm and steady temperament and be able to cope with noisy crowds. They carry an adult in ceremonial gear and two solid silver kettle drums while being guided by reins operated by the rider's feet. Their training takes years, first learning to carry copper drums weighing 10kg each. They work their way up to carrying silver drums; some weighing as much as 52kg each.

== See also ==
- Mounted band
- Military band
- Household Cavalry Mounted Regiment
- Bands of the Household Division
