= Al Maamoura Palace =

Royal palace in Oman

- قصر المعمورة العامر

General information
- Type: Palace
- Town or city: Salalah
- Country: Oman
- Coordinates: 17.05985°N 54.2334034°E
- Owner: Sultan of Oman

Al Maamoura Palace (Arabic: قصر المعمورة العامر Qaṣr al-Maamoura al-Amer) is the Sultan of Oman's residence in Maʽmurah just outside of Salalah. The palace is surrounded by extensive gardens with a falaj running through the grounds.

== History ==
During the Dhofar War, it was occupied by rebels for a short time and then housed an artillery battery.

== Razat Farm ==
Sultan Said bin Taimur began the farm adjacent to Al Maamoura Palace to figure out how to grow tropical and sub-tropical fruits in the Dhofar region. It is now under the jurisdiction of the office of Royal Court Affairs. In March 2024, they announced that specialists at the farm cultivated a new type of banana plant called the Razat Banana that is a subspecies of the Williams Cavendish banana.
