= Omani Royal Guard Military Band =

Musical Band in the Sultan of Oman's Armed Forces

- فرقة الحرس السلطاني العماني
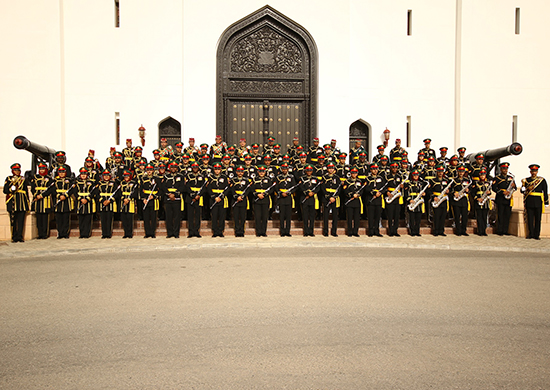
- The combined band at their rehearsal square in April 2018.
- Active: 1981–present
- Country: Oman
- Allegiance: Qaboos bin Said al Said
- Branch: Sultan of Oman's Armed Forces
- Type: Military band
- Size: battalion sized
- Part of: Royal Guard of Oman
- Garrison/HQ: Muscat
- Anniversaries: 1 November

Commanders
- Head of the Military Music Service of Oman: Brigadier General Dr. Ramis Juma’an al Oweira

The Omani Royal Guard Military Band (Arabic: الفرقة العسكرية العمانية للحرس الملكي) is the official music band of the Royal Guard of Oman and the seniormost military band of the Sultan of Oman's Armed Forces. It is specifically dedicated to providing ceremonial honours and music to the Sultan of Oman, the House of Al Said, and public officials.

== Activities ==
The following protocols events are the basis for the activities of the Band of the Royal Guard of Oman:

- Being present at military parades and national events
- Honoring foreign heads of state during state visits to Muscat
- Support the ceremonial activities of the RGO and the Sultan
- Performing exhibition drill

The band frequently performs at home and abroad. Domestically, the band annually performs at a military tattoo in the Royal Opera House Muscat. As per the band's international presence, members of the band have performed in Egypt, the United Kingdom, France, the UAE, and Russia. The mounted band has at one point, performed for Queen Elizabeth II at Windsor Castle in London. The Steel Band also has had an opportunity to participate in the Steel Band Festival in Australia, while the Pipes and Drums have competed in three international pipes and drums competitions in Scotland. In June 2019, it had the honor to perform on Horse Guards Parade for the British Army's Beating Retreat.

== Organization ==
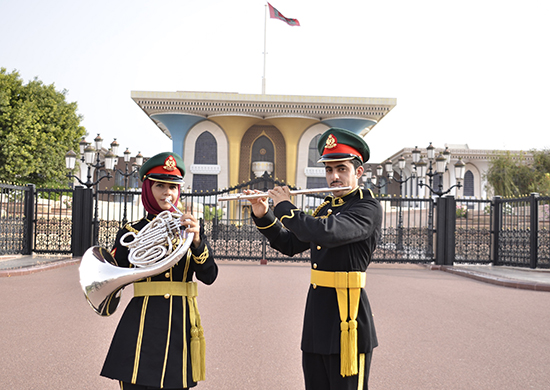
A male and female member of the RGO Band

- Headquarters Administration Company
- Central Infantry Band
- Royal Cavalry Mounted band
- Pipes and Drums
- Jazz Band
- Steel Band
- Symphonic Orchestra
- School of Music

=== Headquarters Administration Company ===
The Headquarters Administration Company serves as the primary support unit responsible for delivering logistical, instructional, and administrative support to the band operating under the authority of the General Directorate of Music.

=== Central Infantry Band ===
The Infantry Band is the premier unit in the RGO Band. The band performs as a concert band, as well as a marching band. The band is divided into two sections which make up the band's composition.

=== Royal Cavalry Mounted Band ===
The Royal Cavalry Mounted Band is the world's only camel mounted pipe band. The horses that are employed are mainly a mix of Arabs, Clydesdales and Shires. The mounted band, which is composed of at least 100 horses and riders, is based at the Al Safinat stables in the Royal Palace. Since 2001, it has seen a significant number of women in its ranks, with women accounting for 25% of the riders in the band as of 2018. When on parade, the pipers lead while a large carriage pulled by six horses carrying kettle drummers follows behind. As a result of the pipes leaving gaps in the pipers teeth, Sultan Qaboos bin Said al Said in 2008, requested that a company design some specialized pipe tubes for the band.

=== School of Music ===
The RGO School of Music is responsible for training musicians of the RGO in all aspects, including marching and the performance of marching music.

- Director General: Brigadier General Dr. Ramis Al Oweira
- Principal Composer: Dr. Leif Sundstrup
- Recording and Engineering Section: Prince Anselm

== Ceremonial Music ==
Title	Event
Junōd al jow	Played at military parades
Salute to the General of the Air Force	Ceremonial honors
Ya Bilād al izz nusōr al jow	Played at military parades
Sunset	Played at ceremonial retreats

== See also ==
- Sultan of Oman's Armed Forces
- Royal Guard of Oman
- Military band
- Mounted band
- Pipe band
- Corps of drums
- Fanfare band
- Marching bands
