= Life Guards' Dragoon Music Corps =

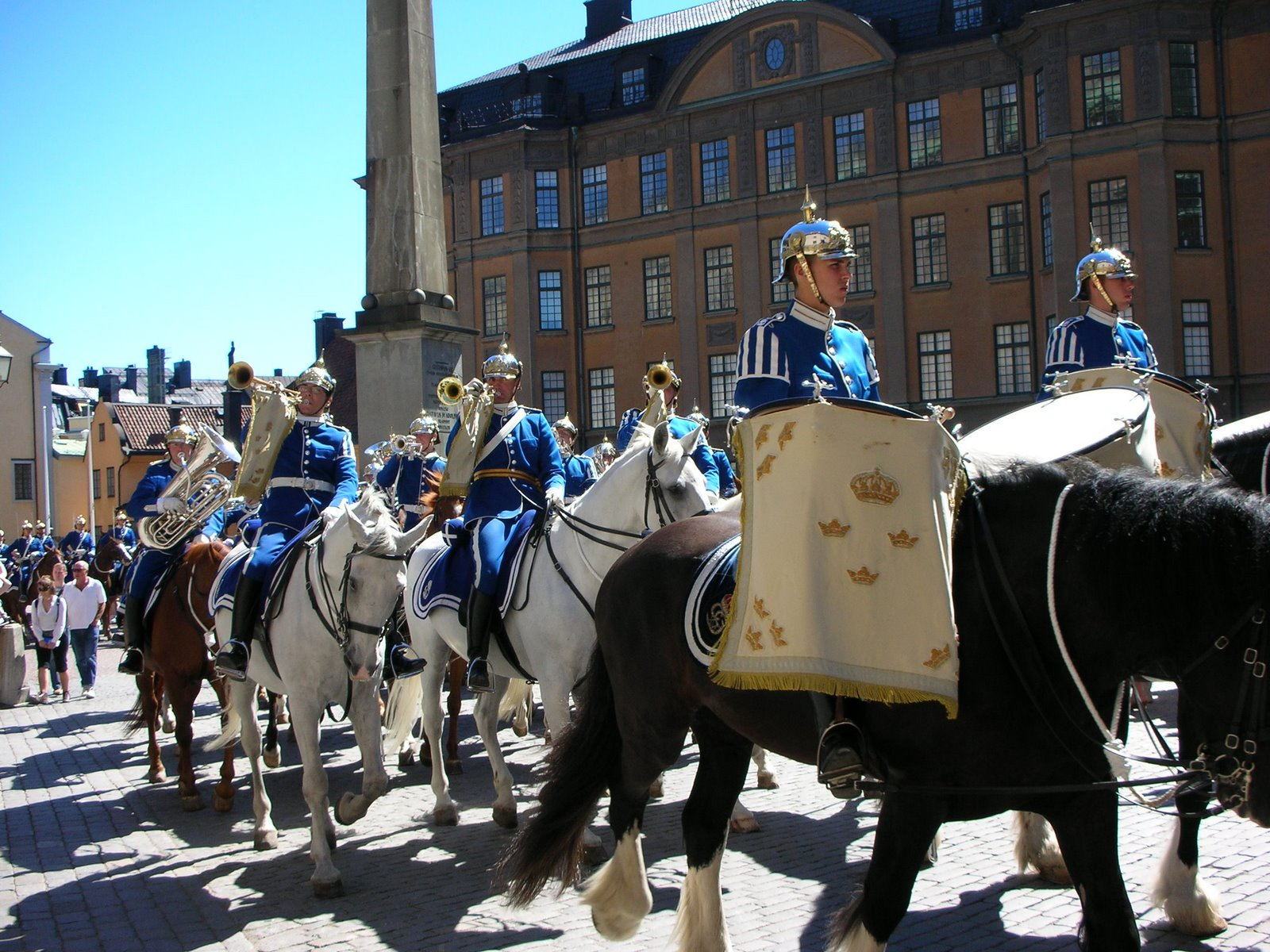
Life Guards' Dragoon Music Corps

The Royal Swedish Cavalry Band (Swedish: Livgardets dragonmusikkår, LDK) is one of three professional military bands in the Swedish Armed Forces. The band traces its ancestry back to the 1500s when King Gustav Vasa raised his first regiment of horse. Today LDK is one of few mounted bands in the world. The band rides at the head of the Life Guards through Stockholm when mounting the King's Guard and the parade is considered one of Sweden's main tourist attractions. This band reports as part of the Swedish Armed Forces Music Corps, which is responsible for the formation and maintenance of Swedish military bands

== Establishment ==
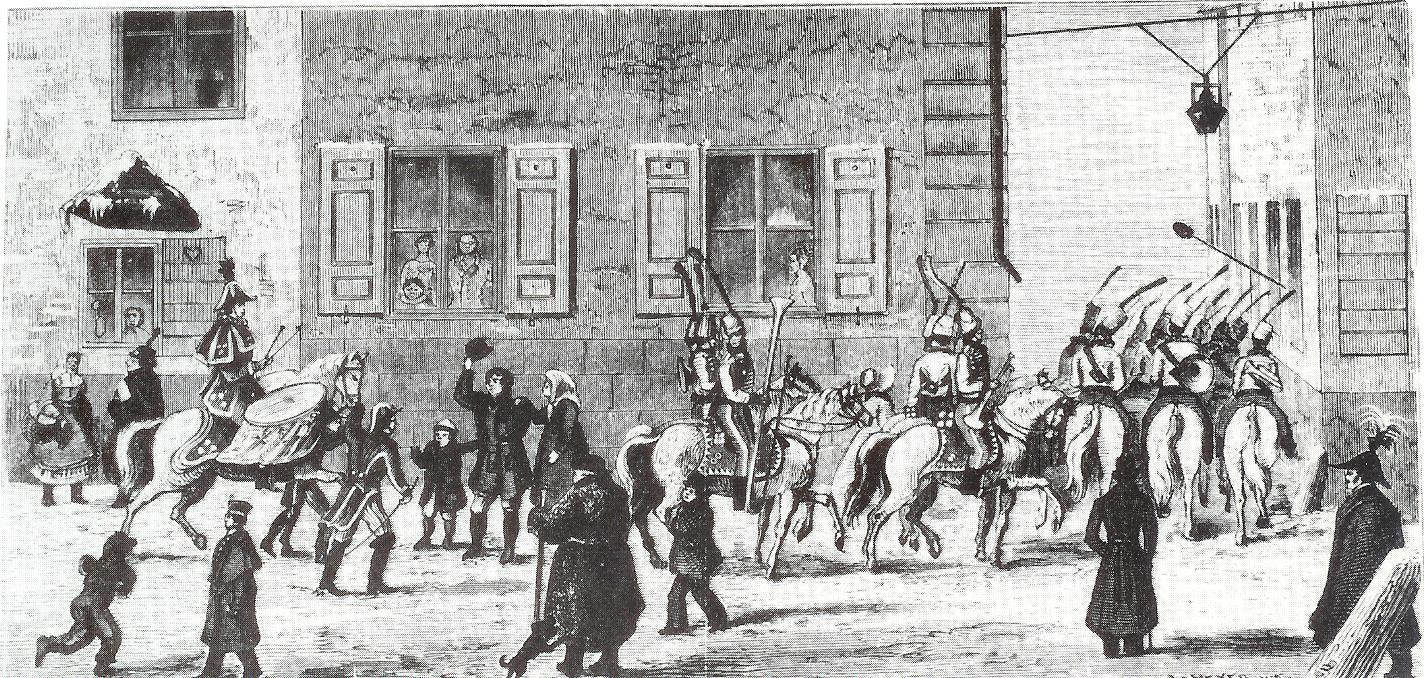
LDK circa 1820

The Royal Swedish Cavalry Band is stationed in the Cavalry Barracks in Stockholm, where the Life Guards' 80 horses are stabled. The band consists of 27 brass instrumentalists and three percussionists. The mounted musicians play either mounted or on foot and conduct public concerts. Each year the band gives around 140 performances, 45 of which are mounted King's guard parades.

== Mounts ==
LDK uses three horse breeds. The black Shires carry the kettle drums and are from the world's tallest horse breed. The Greys are of Altkladruber breed of the Imperial and Royal stud Kladruben -Kladruby-nad-Ladem in today's Czech Republic. The Greys carry the fanfare trumpeters. The Chestnuts of Swedish Warm blood carry the cornets, horns, bass trumpets, euphoniums and tubas.

== Uniforms and accoutrements ==
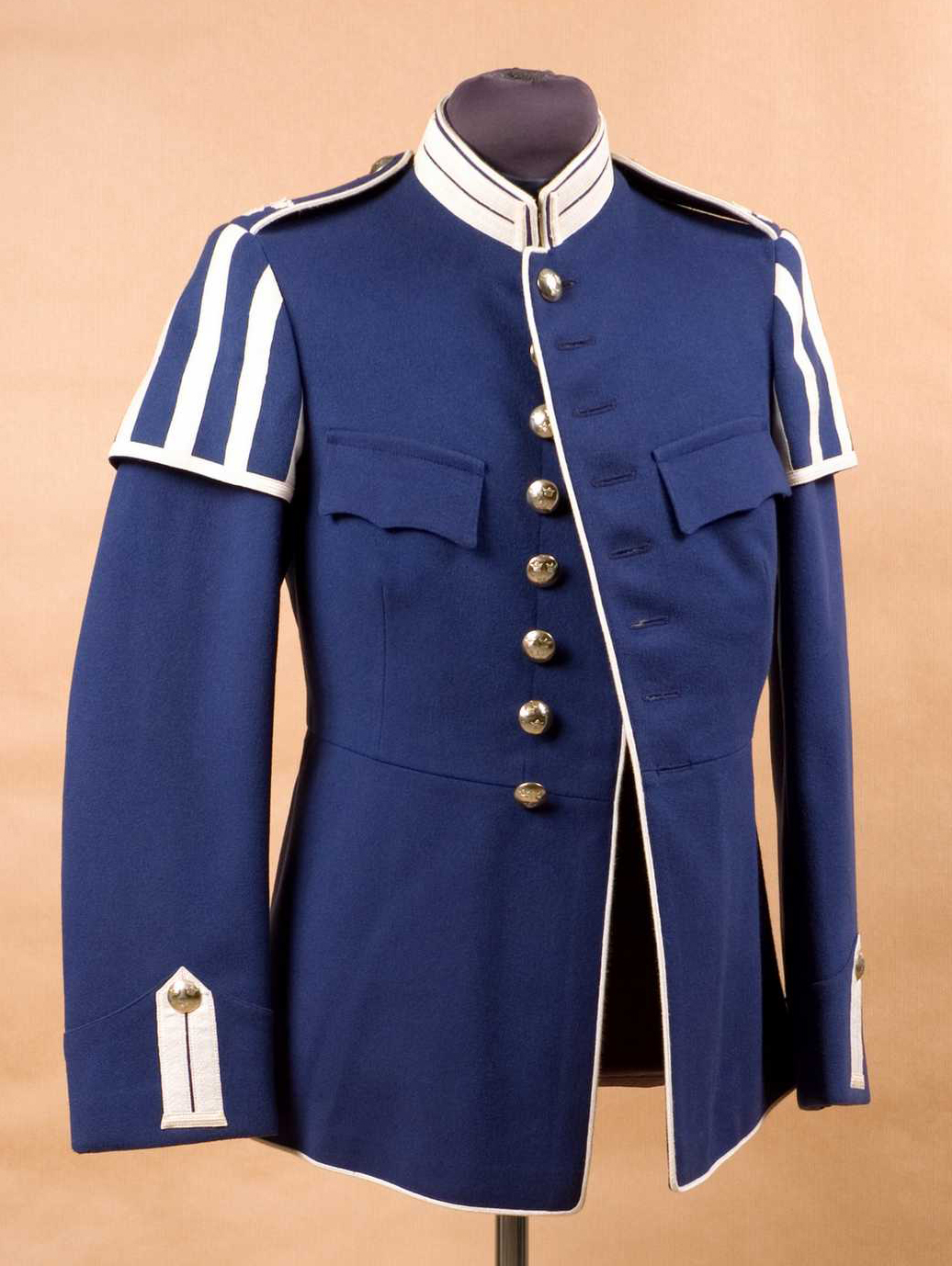
Jacket m/1895 of the Life Guards with musician's swallows nests (other ranks only)

LDK's full dress is Pattern 1895. Originally a battle dress, it is now worn in three different versions: Full Dress Ceremonials, No1 Dress and No2 Dress.

== Repertoire and performances ==
The band's repertoire spans many fields of music - the exceptional is normal for the mounted band; every day, all year round. During the summer you can watch the LDK on their way to the Stockholm Palace. At other times the band may spend a week in Afghanistan playing for the Swedish forces. LDK's many ensembles form the basis for the varied occasions required in the professional armed forces of today. The Royal Swedish Cavalry Band presents everything from single fanfare trumpet calls, through brass quintets and sextets up to accompanying music and all 30 musicians performing simultaneously in concert.

== History ==
When Gustav Vasa was crowned in 1521 his Life Guards (Livdrabanter) had 2 trumpeters. In 1526 King Gustav Vasa raised the first regular regiment of horse in Uppland with an establishment of 12 companies each company having 2 trumpeters. The Uppland Horse (Uplands ryttare) continued to serve in all Swedish campaigns and wars until 1927 when it they were amalgamated with the Life Guards under the new name the Life Regiment of Horse with a 5 squadron establishment and a mounted band of 16. The band was strongly influenced by Wilhelm Wieprecht's great reform of the Prussian mounted military bands 1824–1840. Of the hundreds of mounted bands in Germany, France and Sweden reformed by Wieprecht or influenced by his ideas The Royal Swedish Cavalry Band in Stockholm is the only one remaining.

In 1949 the Royal Horse Guards were disbanded. 1 squadron and the mounted band of 14 musicians formed the Life Guards. In 1971 all professional military bands were outsourced from the Armed Forces in a slightly changed establishment, the mounted band gradually expanded to Director of Music, kettle drummer and 16 musicians. 1990 conscripted musicians were allowed into the band and which in 1992 was transformed into a complete conscript establishment. As fewer and fewer conscripted musicians were available professional musicians were once again enrolled and in 2011-12 the band was once again a full-time professional military band.
