= Royal Artillery Mounted Band =

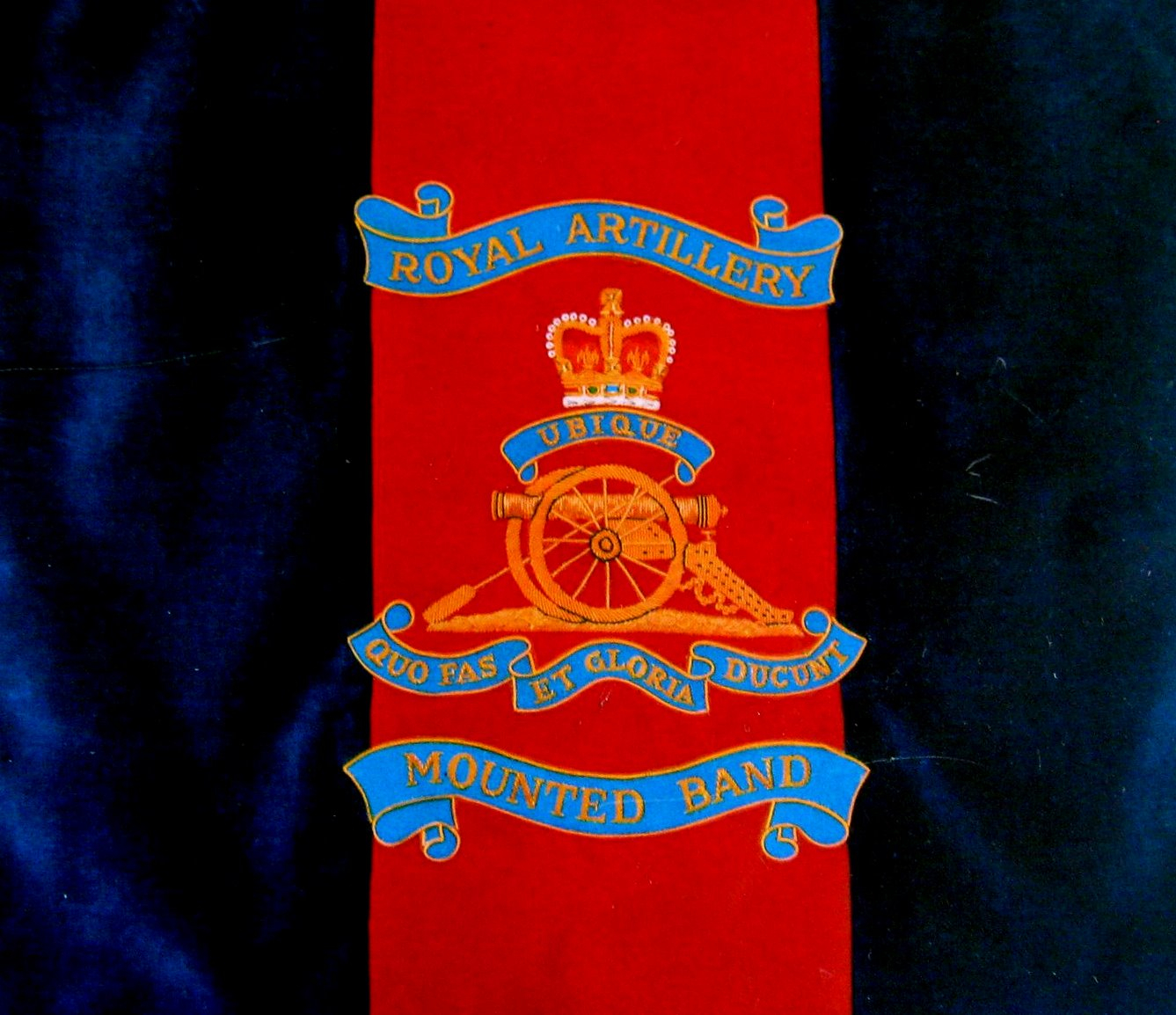
- Music Stand Banner of the Royal Artillery Mounted Band

Background information
- Origin: United Kingdom
- Years active: 1886-1984

The Royal Artillery Mounted Band was a British military band consisting of woodwind, brass, and percussion instruments, and military unit, founded in 1886, and in existence until 1984, representing the Royal Artillery, and the Royal Horse Artillery, and augmenting the Royal Artillery Band at royal and state occasions.

== Origins ==
From 1886 to 1939, the Royal Artillery Mounted Band served as the mounted counterpart of the Royal Artillery Band for horse artillery units of the Royal Artillery under the banner of the Royal Horse Artillery and was the United Kingdom's, and one of Europe's most famous mounted bands, and the favourite of Queen Victoria's. At the funeral of Queen Victoria on 2 February 1901, the Royal Artillery Mounted Band preceded the royal hearse, and the ceremonial troops of both the Royal Horseguards and the Lifeguards, followed by the Royal Artillery (Woolwich) Band. It was the first military band in Great Britain to ever appear on cinematic film. Like all bands of the Royal Regiment of Artillery, the band maintained a full orchestra capability for which it was in great demand, particularly throughout Europe during the Cold War years. The band was disbanded in 1984 as a result of Ministry of Defence cost-cutting measures.

"...the largest mounted band ever seen" '[The Times, June 1984].

=== Historical basis of the RA Band ===
The first documented accounts of music in the 'English Artillery' date back to 1557 at the battle of St. Quentin (1557), where the Artillery had their "drumme and phife". Bands known as 'Hoboys' from the hautbois (oboes) of the French Horse Grenadiers, appeared throughout the cavalry and foot guards regiments. Twenty musicians from the 'Artillerie Band' augmented the Royal Band of King George II aboard a barge on the River Thames, situated "close to the Royal Barge" for the first performance of the 'Water Music', by George Frideric Haendel (Händel), in 1717. It is likely that the Artillery raised additional musicians on ad hoc terms especially for the occasion (the title 'Royal' was first used in 1720). In 1731 we find the Hoboys of the Honourable Artillery Company, which consisted of three oboes, a curtal "and no more". The composer Händel once again enlisted the services of the now 'Royal' Artillery Band on 27 April 1749 at the Royal Fireworks in Green Park. The number of musicians who augmented the Royal Band on that occasion is unspecified, but particular mention of the Artillery kettledrums is well documented. Also, the King had requested that "no fidels (stringed instruments) be used, but the composer wrote on the score that all the oboe and bassoon parts be doubled on strings (these players were again drafted from the Royal Artillery Band).

Fifers were added to the Royal Artillery Corps of Drummers in 1748 on a permanent basis, and the corps continued until after the Crimean War, when it became a bugle band. It soon became apparent that the bandsmen were becoming bored with the limited five-note compass of the instrument, and so they persuaded the instrument maker, Henry Distin to supply them with sets of his newly patented chromatic attachments, to enable the bugle to have the same compass as the cornet. This proved very successful, particularly after the furore created on Woolwich Front Parade, when two buglers performed the Mess Call, playing 'The Roast Beefe of Olde England' in (inadvertent) two-part harmony.

The original kettledrums of the Royal Regiment of Artillery were of a uniquely large pattern, and were mounted on a carriage, designed especially for the purpose. In 1772 the carriage was used at the funeral of the first Duke of Marlborough, John Churchill. Until 1756 the carriage remained in permanent use, and then was stored in the Tower of London (where the artillery guns were made), where it was eventually destroyed by fire in the mid-nineteenth century. The uniform worn by the kettle-drummer, the driver, and the leader, was not the usual uniform of the Royal Artillery. Instead, they wore court livery, as is still seen worn by the drum majors and mounted musicians of the Household Cavalry, on royal, and State occasions today. The entitlement of the Royal Artillery Band to wear court livery (or State dress) still remains, though nowadays it is never exercised, and largely forgotten, most probably because they are not members of the Household Division. However, the Royal Artillery Band does maintain the distinction of being the only band, in which all of its members wear, as part of their ceremonial uniform, a band sword, at the waist. These distinctive swords were presented to the band by the Duke of Kent, father of Queen Victoria.

The Royal Artillery bands were the only ones in the British Army, to wear gold belts, and gold crossbelts (all other musicians and bandsmen wear white, or composite patterned), as well as a uniquely styled musician's lyre badge, on the right forearm (all other musicians or bandsmen wear the British Army Bandman's Lyre on the upper arm). In 1994, because of the band's role supporting the ceremonial duties of the King's Troop, Royal Horse Artillery, it was granted 'State' status, thereby becoming the eighth, and only non-Household Division band to carry that status. It is for this reason, that the band will continue to remain at Woolwich, instead of relocating with the regiment to Larkhill, the new permanent home of the Royal Regiment of Artillery. On 7 February 2012, the King's Troop relocated from St. Johns Wood, to Woolwich. Both the Royal Regiment, and the Royal Artillery Band, have always been particularly close to the hearts of the reigning monarchs of the United Kingdom, who have been Captains General of the RA in their capacity as commanders in chief of the British Armed Forces. Indeed, Her Majesty the Queen, Queen Elizabeth II, as well as holding the honorary appointment of 'Colonel-In-Chief' of several other regiments, also holds the more prestigious appointment of 'Captain General' of both the Royal Artillery, and the Honourable Artillery Company.

Towards the end of the Seven Years' War (1756 - 1763), the Royal Artillery Band was formed, at the battle of Minden in Germany in 1762. Upon its arrival at Woolwich in 1762, where it would be permanently stationed, the status of the band was made official. In 1763 other bands were adopted by various regiments and gradually became officially recognized. Prior to this period all bands (other than the RA Band) were raised only for special occasions and purposes, and were not paid for by the State, but by the officers of their particular regiments. Immediately afterwards they were dissolved.

The Royal Artillery Band numbered eight players who "should be proficient upon the [oboe] and [bassoon] - four of each instrument". The articles of the band were written in German, but were also available translated into English, by virtue of the fact that the first eight musicians employed were German military personnel. The fact that the band was raised in Germany, in the same manner as the other Guards and regimental bands later founded, is by no means unusual. By November 1787, the band (by now stationed at [Woolwich]) was under the command of its 'Master-Musician' Friederich Wiele, also an outstanding violinist. Among the eight musicians, there now numbered five Englishmen, and all of the musicians were capable of performing on stringed, as well as on wind, instruments. In 1795 the bandmaster George McKenzie described the band as possessing fifteen musicians. The proficiency of the musicians led to the desirability of more bands to entertain the numerous artillery regiments of the day. It is worth bearing in mind that although the Royal Artillery Band is the oldest permanent military band in Great Britain, its former years were not always within British shores, and because it remained unrecognized officially until 1762, 'official' bands existed first in the United States of America. By 1763 the second, and all subsequent military band in Britain became recognized officially. Indisputably, the Royal Artillery Band, with its well documented pedigree, is the oldest permanent employer of professional musicians in the kingdom, and the Royal Artillery Orchestra predates the first permanent civilian orchestra in the kingdom by 50 years (among those, there exists a long-standing rivalry between the Royal Philharmonic Orchestra, and the Hallé Orchestra of Manchester, to claim this title) thereby making it Britain's oldest orchestra, with an entirely unbroken history. There are spurious claims by two other military bands, for being the oldest in the kingdom, but these cannot be substantiated, and that there is a significant difference between bands of drums and fifes, or trumpets, and those in which all instruments play in both four part harmony and counterpoint. In the case of the Artillery, their musicians were also required to play stringed instruments.

== History ==
=== The Royal Horse Artillery Band (1797–1886) ===
In January 1793, two troops of Royal Horse Artillery were raised, each being provided with two drummers "who also played upon the bugle-horn". In 1797 trumpeters were designated to these permanent troops. The band was supported financially solely by the officers of that regiment. At the advent of the nineteenth century, an unofficial mounted band is known to have existed in the regiment, because records show that it was supported and funded by the officers of that branch of the army, being under the charge of one Trumpet-Major Hall. In 1845, Bombardier Henry Lawson, one of the finest trumpeters in the country, and principal trumpet of both the Royal Artillery Band and the Royal Artillery Brass Band, was appointed as Trumpet-Major of the Royal Horse Artillery Band in 1845. Lawson, who joined the RA Band in 1823, was frequently compared with Koenig, the famous cornet player of Jullien's band. The band improved considerably under his direction. He was succeeded, after his retirement in 1852 by Trumpet-Major George Collins, the brother of William Collins, bandmaster of the Royal Artillery Band. Collins introduced to the band, an instrument that he had helped to develop many years earlier, the 'keyed bugle' [a link to a history of the keyed bugle may be found in §7 below see esp. P.21]. The first bandmaster of the RHA band was James Browne, who was formerly principal flautist, and a violinist in the RA Band at Woolwich, who succeeded Collins in January 1870. Meanwhile, by the year 1869, so many brass instruments had been added to the band of buglers, that the title was changed to the Royal Artillery Brass Band. The RA Brass Band entered the lists of the Crystal Palace Band Contest in 1871, where it won the first prize of £50.

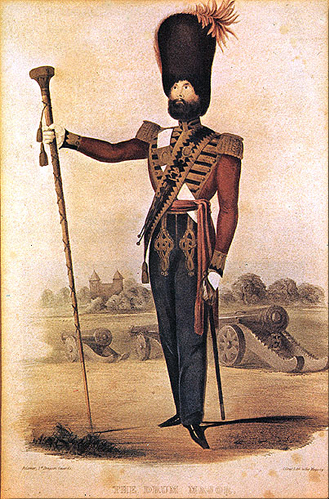
RA Band Drum Major, 1844

The Royal Horse Artillery Band when mounted now numbered 36 men, with kettle-drums and scarlet bannerols, and was regarded as the equal of the best cavalry bands in the army. As a dismounted band, they often deputized for the band of the Coldstream Guards. After the Franco-Prussian War, the numbers of troops in the Field Artillery increased substantially, with the result that the two large previously existing bands, the RA Band, and the RA Brass Band, because they were dismounted, found themselves without duty. The result was that the RHA Band was now required to attend all the parades of the Royal Horse Artillery and the Royal Field Artillery. The financial burden to the RHA officers who supported the band led to deep resentment, and the decision was made, in 1877, by the then Duke of Cambridge to form a new band from the best members of the RHA Band, and the RA Brass Band, with the express instruction that Bombardier Henry Lawson (of the RA Brass Band) be its bandmaster. A letter dated 13 November 1877 from the War Office confirms that a committee be set up to consider a plan put forward by the RHA for the formation of a mounted band for the whole regiment of artillery. On the disbandment of the RHA Band, its bandmaster, James Browne retired. Following the rider-training of the best members of the RA Brass Band, and together with the best members of the RHA Band, the new Royal Artillery Mounted Band came into being.

=== The Royal Artillery Mounted Band (1886–1984) ===
The Royal Artillery Mounted Band, which was for many dubbed "...the largest mounted band ever seen", was originally formed at Woolwich, London, on 19 January 1878, under the direction of its bandmaster, James Lawson, who had formerly led both the Royal Artillery Bugle Band and the Royal Artillery Brass Band. A surplus of horses from the Royal Horse Artillery and Royal Field Artillery prompted the creation of The Royal Artillery Mounted Band (Woolwich) which comprised 62 musicians, 42 of these mounted on horses.

=== Early years ===
Later in the foundation year of the Mounted Band at Woolwich, news was received that the Duke of Cambridge had made the decision, that because of the large proportion of Horse and Field Artillery equipment, and troops situated in Aldershot, it was only right that the Garrison should have a mounted band permanently stationed there. During the following year, 25 mounted musicians and horses were posted to Aldershot, leaving 35 mounted musicians with the Royal Artillery Band in Woolwich. On 26 August 1887, the Woolwich 'mounted band' was suppressed. All of its members transferred to the Aldershot band. The remaining 12 musicians were absorbed into the Royal Artillery Band, which was ordered to provide a 'Mounted Portion' of twenty players. Eight musicians were immediately required to undergo rider training in order to prepare for mounted duty. The 'Mounted Portion' comprised: 1 'Serjeant in charge', 2 Bombardiers, and 17 'Bandsmen'. In 1894, the then Duke of Connaught arranged for a searchlight display to take place in Aldershot, for Queen Victoria. The Royal Artillery Mounted Band, as the main band opened the impressive display, that would become the first of the Aldershot Command searchlight tattoos, held annually to audiences often exceeding 500,000. Among its other prestigious engagements, the Royal Artillery Mounted Band "the largest mounted band ever seen" [The Times] had the privilege of heading the lord mayor of London's processions, and the funeral procession of Queen Victoria in 1901 where it preceded the hearse. Under its famous bandmaster, Mr James Lawson, the band contributed regularly to the Woolwich Town Hall concerts, but purely as a military band, "in which sphere [as was widely documented at the time], it eclipsed the Royal Artillery Band. It ought to be mentioned, that the famous Italian conductor of the Royal Artillery Band, Cavaliere Ladislao Zavertal, deliberately took no notice of Mr Lawson's achievements, preferring to concentrate his efforts into transforming the Royal Artillery Orchestra (Britain's oldest-established permanent orchestra, founded in 1763) into the ensemble that would become renowned throughout Europe.

The instrumentation of the Royal Artillery Band in Aldershot came largely from the Royal Artillery Brass Band (formerly under the charge of Lawson), and consisted of 8 cornets, 3 tenor horns, two baritones, 2 E-Flat bombardons, and 1 pair of kettledrums. To this, 5 woodwinds, including E-Flat 'clarionette' and piccolo were added. All of the musicians were required to become proficient on stringed instruments – a required condition that has remained in all Royal Artillery bands from 1887 to the current day. In 1897 the 'mounted portion' of the Royal Artillery Band was disbanded, leaving the Aldershot band to fulfil all remaining mounted ceremonial duties. During the tour of New Zealand, by the Royal Artillery (Woolwich) Band (May 1913 – March 1914), approximately half of that band remained in London to provide an orchestra. The RA Bands Committee chose to allow Mr Henry Sims and the Royal Artillery Mounted Band to fulfill the London concerts at Queen's Hall, although the strings were actually augmented by those string players remaining in Woolwich. Orchestral music in all of the Royal Artillery's bands has always been maintained as an important, and integral feature of the regiment's music, and the string sections in general, have always comprised mainly those musicians, whose primary instruments were/are stringed instruments. Likewise, primary brass, woodwind, and percussion players, would specialize in the military band ensembles. On 17 May 1913 The Royal Artillery Mounted Band gave the first performance at the opening of the new bandstand, at the riverside promenade (The Groves) in Chester.

=== War years (1939–1945) ===
In 1939 on the outbreak of war, the horses were returned to the Remount Depot. Before the end of 1940, the main four artillery bands were allotted their separate War stations. The Royal Artillery (Woolwich) Band was made responsible for tours in the Northern and Scottish Commands, and a single tour of duty in Northern Ireland. The Royal Artillery Mounted Band was renamed 'The Royal Artillery (Aldershot) Band' for the duration of the war, and moved in 1941 to Harrogate in North Yorkshire, to take over the Northern and Scottish Commands (to be stationed at Hildebrand Barracks, Penny Pot Lane, Harrogate), while the Woolwich band returned to London, to serve the South Eastern Command, with a small detachment of the band at Watford for the Eastern Command [the RA (Portsmouth) Band went to Cheshire for the Western Command, while the RA (Salisbury Plain) Band was sent to Bulford Camp for the Southern Command]. The number of days the Aldershot band spent away from headquarters, some of them in battle zones is: 176 (in 1941); 214 (in 1942); 171 (in 1943); 123 (in 1944). Upon the band's return to Aldershot at the end of the war, at the King's suggestion, it was reinstated with the highly prized title 'Mounted Band' because of its former associations with the Royal Horse Artillery, and on the understanding that the RHA may at any time claim entitlement to the services of the band above all requests by other regiments. It is also notable, that the King's Troop, Royal Horse Artillery (who, when their guns are on parade, are at the 'right of the line' of the British Army, and though not Household Cavalry, are nevertheless at the head of the Household Troops, which include the former) have always remembered the RHA connection of the Mounted Band with affection – still regarding them as their own – and the musicians were granted the right to be forever affiliated with this equestrian branch of the Service.

The Royal Artillery Mounted Band, renamed 'Royal Artillery (Aldershot) Band' as the band of Northern Command, stationed from 1940 to 1945 in Hildebrand Barracks, Harrogate, North Yorkshire

=== Post-war history and final years (1945–1984) ===
On 1 August 1947 the Royal Artillery Mounted Band, and the Portsmouth and Salisbury Plain bands were granted staff band status, along with three other corps bands. In the case of these Royal Artillery bands, they were to be known as "minor staff bands" because they were under the administration of the Royal Artillery Band in Woolwich as the 'parent' unit. The then serving bandmaster of the Mounted Band, Mr David McBain, was commissioned as its first director of music. At that time, the band was stationed at Minden Barracks, Deepcut, Surrey. In 1967 the band moved to Germany, where it replaced the Royal Artillery (BAOR) Band at Dortmund, although the 'BAOR' had, until then, been stationed in Oldenburg. During the band's extensive tour throughout Germany and in other European countries the band fulfilled many important engagements, including the British Week in Vienna ambassadorial event in October 1969.

The band returned to the UK in 1972 to be stationed for the first time at Larkhill, on Salisbury Plain, where it replaced the newly styled 'Royal Artillery Alanbrooke Band' (formerly the Royal Artillery (BAOR) Band). By now, it had been decided that the two bands would alternate locations every five years. The new arrangement continued until the final return of the Mounted Band to Larkhill, where it was disbanded within months of making its last-ever appearance at the Edinburgh Military Tattoo in 1984. The Royal Artillery was required in 1976 to provide a band to play for the Mounting of the Guard at Buckingham Palace. So that the Royal Artillery Band was able to still meet its previously agreed commitments for orchestra, the Royal Artillery Mounted Band formed the bulk of the 50-piece palace band, with its remaining men drawn from Woolwich. The Woolwich musicians being in the minority were thereby required to remove their band swords, to satisfy a uniform appearance. All three RA bands were reunited, with support from the various affiliated Territorial Army bands, at the Beating of the Retreat in June, 1980 on Horse Guards Parade, Whitehall Whitehall, in London, in the presence of Her Majesty the Queen, the Captain General of the Royal Regiment.

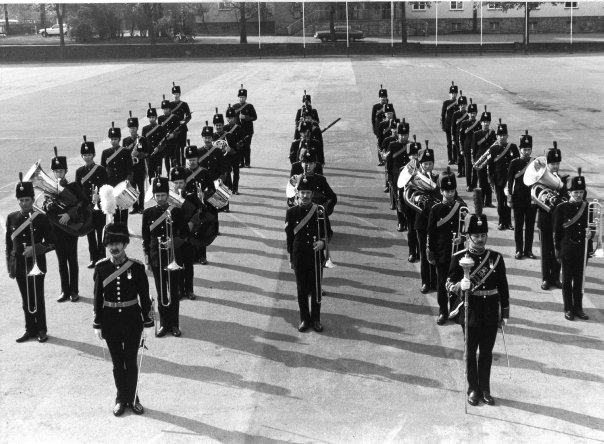
The Royal Artillery Mounted Band, under the command of its Director of Music, Captain Brian Hicks, R.A. at West Riding Barracks, Dortmund

During the 43-strong band's final five-year tenure in Germany, stationed at Dortmund, its strength rose briefly to 47 musicians (including three flutes, two oboes, thirteen clarinets, two bassoons, three French horns, and two euphoniums). Each of its musicians, in the true tradition of the Royal Artillery bands, played at least two instruments – one military band instrument and one orchestral (one of its musicians was recruited as a bouzouki player / violist, who also learned to play the clarinet!). This would be the high point in the size of the band, before it began to slowly diminish in size, though not in stature. The diversity and number of ensembles contained within the capabilities of the band were widely known and respected, and even included such exotic instruments as the accordion, and aforementioned bouzouki, with the band notably becoming the first to include a synthesizer in its commercial recordings under its then director of music, [Captain] Terence (Terry) Kenny. Musicians typically applied from all over the United Kingdom to join the band, responding to advertisements in such publications as 'Melody Maker' and 'Gramophone'. Kenny was succeeded by [Captain] Brian Hicks as director of music in October 1977. Hicks remained with the band until the first year of its return to Salisbury Plain.

Prior to the band's return to the United Kingdom in 1982, it could still muster 38 musicians, however, following voluntary redundancies and postings to other bands, the number of musicians declined to 24 by the time its ultimate album was recorded, towards the end of 1983, at Wembley Studios, under the baton of [Captain] Frank Anthony Renton. Frank Renton did much to maintain the high profile of the Mounted Band, not least to boost the morale of the musicians awaiting their fates under the looming shadow of disbandment, with a choice of being posted to either Woolwich, or Germany to join the Royal Artillery Band and Alanbrooke Band respectively, or redundancy.

Throughout its long history the Royal Artillery Mounted Band maintained a particularly high standard of performance, for which it will always be remembered. This held the band in good stead on the various occasions when, owing to its seniority, it would take precedence at prestigious events, such as during the Festival of Flanders on 6 September 1980, where at the 'Sportpaleis' in Gent, it was seen with the larger, and similarly famous Band of the Grenadier Guards. At the Sportpaleis, and at the Paleis des Beaux Arts (also in Gent), the band excelled both musically, and visually, with that of the Grenadier Guards again also participating. In spite of its many public appearances as a marching band and concert band, the band retained the kudos it had always received for its orchestra, and as such, by far exceeded the number of engagements it fulfilled as a military band. During its time in Dortmund, the orchestra regularly provided a 20-piece pit orchestra, to accompany the West Rhine Musical Society at the Garrison Theatre, Rheindahlen. The week-long productions included 'Princess Ida', 'Yeoman of the Guard', 'Fiddler on the Roof', 'Carousel', 'Patience', and 'My Fair Lady' among others, with further musicals to accompany at the Garrison Theatre, Dortmund, including 'My Fair Lady'.

The orchestra travelled regularly throughout the British Army of the Rhine area, and frequently across European borders, to perform at military bases, embassies, and also for civilian private hires. The orchestral library was almost as extensive as that of the military band. The Mounted Band was the only band of the British Army of the Rhine, to possess a true capability on stringed instruments, as each of its personnel, in the tradition of all Royal Artillery Band musicians, was expected to also play a stringed instrument in addition to either a wind, or a percussion instrument. The orchestra would typically play for three or four mess functions (i.e. banquets) per week, with certain musicians remaining to provide a dance band until the early hours in the morning, with most of the musicians still being required to appear in the military band on various parade grounds throughout Germany, in addition to frequent private (civilian) engagements and concerts. Many of the string players continued their careers in civilian orchestras, and at one time there was a predominance of ex-RA Mounted Band string players in the Royal Opera House Orchestra. Private orchestral engagements were particularly varied, and even included playing for all-Strauss galas and fashion shows, namely at the Hilton Hotel in Vienna, and accompanying artistes such as Harry Secombe, Eve Boswell, Moira Anderson, and others. These assets were suitably accorded the esteem they deserved, when on 25 October 1982, the last of the band's quinquennial inspections, by the Inspector of Army Bands took place at Larkhill. The number of band members by that time at fallen to 33. In the traditions set by the band, as has indeed was also the case at the two previous Kneller Hall inspections (as they are usually dubbed), the Royal Artillery Mounted Band was awarded the highest possible marks in all areas, involving all ensemble combinations within the band.

=== 1984 - Final year ===
By the beginning of the year, the band comprised 24 members, not including its director of music. By The last official photographs of the individual members of the band were taken, and mounted in a large frame, to commemorate a band that had existed for almost a century. This set of photographs (shown above, right) is now in the possession of the Royal Artillery Band at Woolwich, London. The orchestra and dance band were invited to play at the British Dental Association's Gala Dinner, at the Guildhall, London, on 16 June 1984, in the presence of the lord mayor of London. The orchestra was conducted on that occasion by its director of music, Captain Frank Renton, RA. On the evening of 11 July the band was present for a massed bands display, at the Royal School of Artillery, with the Royal Artillery Band, and bands of the 1st Battalion The Gloucester Regiment, 2nd Battalion The Parachute Regiment, and the Royal Electrical and Mechanical Engineers. The final year of the band was filled with numerous major engagements, culminating in a resounding triumph in Italy, where the band took part in the International Music Week in Turin and performed at the British embassy in Rome (in June 1984). The last major engagement at which the band performed, from mid-July until mid-August, was at the (now 'Royal -') Edinburgh Military Tattoo, as the senior band under the command of WO2 (BSM) S.M. Day. The other bands taking part at the time, including the Band of the Scots Guards, the Band of the Queen's Own Highlanders, the band of the Argyll and Sutherland Highlanders, and the Royal Band South, of H.M. The Sultan of Oman. As the Mounted Band was at the time bereft of a director of music, the Tattoo Director of Music that year was Major D. Carson, Scots Guards. On 20 October 1984, a farewell dinner was held for the Royal Artillery Mounted Band, at the Warrant Officers' and Sergeants' Mess at Larkhill. Aside from the current members of the band, three former band members attended, including Ernie Langhope, who served in the band from 1920 to 1945. For the occasion the RA (Woolwich) Band provided a six-piece mess orchestra. Days after the farewell dinner, the band's remaining 24 members were posted to each of the remaining Royal Artillery's bands, with some following those who had already taken voluntary redundancy.

== Bandmasters and Directors of Music ==
James Lawson became the first bandmaster of the Royal Artillery Mounted Band in Woolwich, and was succeeded by Henry Sims in Aldershot, who was bandmaster from 1886 to 1918.

In 1919 it was decided by the Royal Military School of Music and the War Office, that 'Directors of Music' would head the three bands of the Household Cavalry, all bands of the Royal Regiment of Artillery, the Bands of the Royal Engineers, and the regimental bands of the five regiments of footguards of the Brigade of Guards. All other bands retained a 'Bandmaster' as head, and the Royal Artillery Band retained in addition to its director of music, a bandmaster, for the reason of it being the largest of all British military bands, with its own musical training establishment, the Junior Musicians Troop, Royal Artillery.

Successors to Henry Sims were:

- Augustus Joseph Dunn (1918–1920)
- Thomas James Hillier (1920–1935)
- Sam Rhodes (1935–1938)
- David McBain (1938–1948)
- Basil Hector Brown (1948–1958)
- William Williams (1958–1966)
- George Edwin Evans (1966–1972)
- Terence Alan John Kenny (1972–1977)
- Brian Erwin Hicks (1977–1982)
- Frank Anthony Renton (1982–1984)

In its last few months in existence, the band was conducted and managed by Drum Major Shaun Day. Four directors of Music of the Royal Artillery Mounted Band, during the postwar era, succeeded to the highest post in military music, that of Principal Director of Music, of the Royal Military School of Music, at Kneller Hall, Twickenham. The four DoMs were: David McBain, Basil Brown, George Evans and Frank Renton.

== Locations ==
- "(i)" 1886 until 1887 at Royal Artillery Barracks, Woolwich
- "(ii)" 1887 until 1940 at Mons Barracks, Aldershot"(iii) 1940 until 1944 at Hildebrand Barracks, Harrogate, North Yorkshire
- (iv) 1947 until 1950? at Minden Barracks, Deepcut, Surrey.
- (v) 1950[?] until January 1967 at Mons Barracks, Aldershot.
- (vi) January 1967 until January 1972 at West Riding Barracks Dortmund, West Germany.
- (vii) January 1972 until January 1977 at the Royal School of Artillery, Larkhill, Wiltshire.
- (viii) January 1977 until January 1982 at West Riding Barracks, Dortmund, West Germany.
- (vi) January 1982 until disbandment on 31 March 1985 at RSA, Larkhill, Wiltshire.

== Ceremonial uniform ==
=== 1886–1939 ===
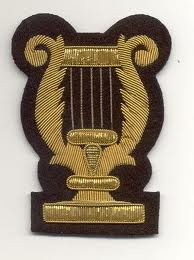
The unique RA Band lyre, (No.1 Dress version) as only worn by the Royal Artillery's musicians, and on the right forearm (rather than the standard army 'bandsman's lyre' which is worn by all other Army bandsmen and musicians, on the upper arm)

Originally the only headdress worn by when mounted, was the blue forage cap. As a marching band, all RA bands wore the busby. In 1894 a new style black sable busby was introduced (the earlier busby having once replaced the shako from c. 1850 until the end of the 1860s) with a scarlet bag on the right, and a brass grenade on the left, which held a red cut feather plume. The busby was held in place on the head by a brass chin chain, on a black leather strap. The busby (originally the headdress of hussars) became the correct headdress for all mounted ceremonial duties, as well as for marching band. At some time during the late 1860s, the familiar modern helmet, with a ball replacing the usual spike (similar to that worn by policemen) appeared, which remained part of the uniform until 1894. [Shako >busby (c. 1850) >>modern helmet (from c. 1860) >>>modern busby (from 1894)] The tunic was not worn on horseback: the patrol jacket of the royal artillery was worn instead. The patrol jacket was made of navy blue cloth with a scarlet collar edged in gold lace; at each side on the front were gilt grenade badges. The front of the jacked was piped with yellow-ochre rope (later replaced with gold Russia braid) and was fastened by hooks and eyes. The shoulder straps were gold cords held in place by a gilt button at the collar. The cuffs of the jacket were navy blue with an Austrian knot in gold cord. The pouch belt (worn over the left shoulder) was white leather with a large black patent leather pouch (for carrying music cards, on the flap of which was fastened the RA gun badge. The waistbelt was also of white leather, with a brass snake-hook clasp. The RA band-sword [see "The Royal Artillery Band" (¶1) above] was not worn, and so the sword slings were linked together. Peculiar to the Mounted band were the girdles (similar to the broader stable belts of today) that were worn together with the pouch belts. The girdle (introduced in 1904) sported the RA colours, red, and blue, and was fastened with brass olivettes and loops (originally at the wearer's front, then at the side). A year later, a wider version, with a central stripe in blue was introduced to the RA Mounted Band, and later into the RA bands in Dover, Plymouth, and Portsmouth. In 1920, it was finally introduced into the RA Band at Woolwich. A more recent girdle design, still to be seen worn by some of the musicians in the 1980s, featured brass clasp-fastenings, adorned with the RA musicians' lyre. White leather gloves with clay-piping were uniquely worn in the Mounted Band (those worn in the other bands were of white brushed cotton). The riding breeches were navy blue with a broad scarlet stripe down the outer seam. The riding boots were of black leather and spurs were held on by straps. In undress, a blue forage (pill-box) cap with a gold lace band was worn. When marching, the mounted bands wore the standard officer pattern 'George' boot with 'dress' spurs fixed to the heel with screws, rather than the 'box' spurs as worn by officers. The silver-plated kettledrums were covered in a dark blue 'bib' (drum banner). The harness was of brown leather with a brass-studded bridle and a breast plate of brass, depicting the grenade badge. The shabraque was likewise decorated. The third, or 'foot rein' was fastened onto the stirrups. The bit reins, and bridal reins rested in the neck of the animal. The saddle was the standard army pattern. So as to make a distinction between the two bands, no kettle drum bibs or shabraques were used by the 'Mounted Portion' at Woolwich. In 1899, in anticipation of the start of the new millennium, the brass 'bomb' plume holder was moved to the front of the Royal Artillery busby, and the plume was changed from cut feather to scarlet horsehair.

=== 1939-1984 ===
During the Second World War, the band's uniform was identical to that worn by the RHA troops: khaki Service Dress with boots with puttees. The headdress was the khaki Service Dress cap, with a black leather chin strap, which continued to be worn by the Mounted Band until its last days. On the right arm forearm of the jacket, was a khaki worsted lyre, unique to artillery musicians. After the war, the band adopted, as its 'ceremonial' uniform, the No. 1 Dress jacket (blues) with scarlet facings, replaced the tunic. The corresponding No. 1 Dress trousers sporting a wide scarlet stripe on the outside seam were worn. Service stripes were permitted on No. 1 Dress jackets, and the RA stable belt continued to be worn. The busby was not reintroduced until the 1960s, the headdress of the time being the No. 1 Dress peaked cap. The Royal Artillery Woolwich Band continued to wear the band sword [an image of the sword can be found by following the link at the bottom of the page] with this uniform. Standard pattern black leather shoes were worn. After the reintroduction of the busby, close-fitting cavalry-style trousers were adopted, and these were buckled under the instep of the 'George' boot, by the aid of leather straps. Silver dress spurs were screwed to the heel of the boot. The stable belt was no longer worn, but replaced by the standard officer pattern leather cross belt, worn over the left shoulder, which was covered in 18 carat gold wire, with a small black patent leather pouch, onto which a gilt RA gun badge was fastened. In preparation for the birthday parade for Her Majesty The Queen, on Horse Guards Parade, London (June 1986), musicians from the surviving RA (Woolwich), and RA (Alanbrooke) bands were measured for the new design of tunic, in navy with scarlet cuffs and collar, quilted silk lining, and additional 18 carat gold braiding. The braiding was more pronounced according to the rank of the wearer. This is the design that continues to be worn by the present Royal Artillery Band.

== Regimental music ==
=== The British Grenadiers ===
The tune 'The British Grenadiers' was first adopted for use as a regimental march by the Honourable Artillery Company (the oldest British regiment), during the English Civil War. Although grenades were first thrown by artillerymen in 1643, the term 'grenade' was only first documented in 1688. Originally a Dutch song, the melody now known as 'The British Grenadiers' was brought to England by King William III of the Netherlands. Soon after the melody became popular in these islands, a version of it, titled 'The New Bath' appeared in a '17th Century Dance Book' by Playford. In the Netherlands, it is known as 'De jonge prins van Friesland' ('The Young Friesian Prince') after Prince Johann Willem Friso. In 1706, the march became the regimental quick march of the Royal Artillery, and was known as the 'Royal Artillery Grenadiers March', but was not declared 'official' until 1882. It first appeared in print, as 'The British Grenadiers' in 1740. As a regimental quick march, the short duration of the melody has always resulted in unwanted repetition, but in 1983, Lieutenant-Colonel Stanley Patch (then director of music) provided a suitable solution, by adding the 'Trio' section of another favourite artillery march, 'The Voice of The Guns', composed by Major F.J. Ricketts under the pseudonym 'Kenneth J. Alford'. The popularity of the tune 'The British Grenadiers' rivalled that of its contemporary 'Lilliburlero', and subsequently led to its adoption by all regiments who wear as their cap or collar badges, the symbol of the grenade. These include the Grenadier Guards, and all Fusilier regiments.

=== The Trayne of Artillery's Grenadiers March ===
Prior to the Royal Artillery adopting 'The British Grenadiers' as its regimental quick march, 'The Train of Artillery' (as it is now known) was the rather elegant (medium-)quick march of the royal regiment. This march first appeared in print, published by Thompson & Son, London, in 'The Compleat Tutor for the Fife', circa 1760. The first grenadiers were artillery men.

The original military march is scored for eight players, comprising 2 piccolos (in two-part counterpoint), 2 oboes, 2 bassoons, and 2 drums. Two updated recordings exist by the Royal Artillery – one conducted by its director of music Major Robert Quinn, (in 18th Century style, albeit it scored for full modern military band), and a more up-to-date version, conducted by Lt Colonel Malcom Torrent.

In Georgian times, the musicians ('bandsmen') would walk, rather than march, ahead of the fighting troops onto the battle field, in order to help boost the morale of the troops.

=== The Minden Rose ===
The origins of this march are obscure. The piece was first documented as 'Mindener-Marsch', and possibly came into being during the battle of Minden. In style, it is a ceremonial 'Reiter-Marsch', or cavalry march, and probably adapted to accompany the horse-drawn guns of the Artillery, from a German regional folk song.

=== The Marquess of Granby's March ===
This is the original slow march of the Royal Artillery, and appeared in print, published by Thompson & Son, London, in 'The Compleat Tutor for the Fife', circa 1760. The Marquess of Granby (the Earl of Rutland) was master-general of the regiment (1763–1772), and was preceded by General Ligonier (1759–1763) after whom, a now forgotten slow march 'General Ligonier's March' was named. The appointment 'master-general' is nowadays known as 'Master Gunner, St. James's Park' (not to be confused with 'master gunner', which is a warrant officer special skills appointment).

=== The Royal Artillery Slow March ===
The Royal Artillery Slow March was written by Her Royal Highness, the Duchess of Kent, and mother of Queen Victoria (herself "a most competent musician"), circa 1836. It is also the regimental walk march of the Royal Horse Artillery and at least one other regiment.

=== Regimental Trot 'The Keel Row' ===
The Royal Horse Artillery (and cavalry regiments) adopted this Tyneside air in 1903 on its publication by the War Office. This march is one example of the regiment's intention to cater for all of its troops, drawn, as they were, from all regions of the United Kingdom. By comparison, almost all other regiments have traditionally recruited locally (e.g. the Devon & Dorset Regiment, the Durham Light Infantry, etc.).

=== Regimental Canter 'Bonnie Dundee' ===
The melody of 'Bonnie Dundee' dates back to the battle of Bannockburn in 1314. By 1600 the melody was certainly known all over Scotland and England. It appears in 'The Beggar's Opera' and was used by Robert Burns. It is also associated with a poem by Sir Walter Scott, which commemorates the Viscount of Dundee's bravery in the 1689 rebellion. It is believed that the title of this melody refers to the Viscount of Dundee, rather than to the jute-, and marmalade-producing City of the same name.

=== Fanfare 'The Royal Regiment' ===
The composer Frederic Curzon (1899, London – 1973, Bournemouth) was, at one time, a gunner officer. Curzon wrote this fanfare for the opening of the Royal Artillery Association Rally in 1952. Its masterful use of both the RA's and RHA's 'Trumpet Call' typify the composer's penchant for incorporating melodies that he associated with his personal experiences in life. Of his many lasting compositions, perhaps the most perennial are the suites "Robin Hood", "In Malaga", "Dance Of An Ostracized Imp", "Galavant", and "The Boulevardier", all of which continue to be performed, and recorded by orchestras worldwide. Other notable composers who wrote specially for the Royal Artillery Band include Zavertal, Dvorak, C P E Bach, and Sir Arthur Bliss, Master of the Queen's Music. The military band medium has also attracted such eminent composers as Beethoven, Korngold, Meyerbeer, Fucik, Ganne, Léhàr, Händel, Holst, Vaughan Williams, Morton Gould, Schickele, Walford Davies, Russell Bennett, Ives, and Malcolm Arnold, to name a few.

=== The 'Eton Boating Song' ===
The 'Eton Boating Song' is not connected to the famous British public school of the same name. It was composed in 1863 by one Captain Algernon Drummond, and transcribed by T. L. Mitchell, and the piano accompaniment was arranged by Evelyn Wodehouse. The words of Kipling's 'Screw Guns' from his 'Barrack Room Ballads' are well known to RA officers and soldiers. Screw guns were so-named, because the barrels could be broken down into pieces, to be carried on mules in mountainous regions. They were last used during the Second World War, by RA Mountain Regiments in the campaign in Italy. The piece was arranged for orchestra, with a transcribed edition for military band, by Karl Kaps, as an 'English' (='slow', with 3 definite beats to the bar) waltz, and published by B. Feldman & Co. London.

== Selected discography ==
Despite the relative paucity of commercial albums released by the Royal Artillery Mounted Band, many of their tracks were frequently broadcast over the radio throughout the 1970s, and original pieces from the band's library were often heard in special arrangements by the leading light orchestras of the day, such as Paul Fenhoulet & His Orchestra ('Serenade For A Gondolier'), and Frank Chacksfield & His Orchestra ('Souvenir de Montmatre') on such shows as 'Friday Night Is Music Night', and on LPs. The prolific novelty compositions by former director of music Terry Kenny (including under numerous pseudonyms) continue to be recorded by military bands, and wind bands worldwide, and now closely rival the number of recordings of marches by British composer Kenneth J. Alford. The band was the first British band to issue proper 'Big Dance Band' numbers in its recordings, since the Royal Air Force Band's 'Squadronaires' during, and immediately after the Second World War.

"OUT OF THE BOX"

The Royal Artillery Mounted Band

Captain T. A. Kenny, A.R.C.M., p.s.m., R.A.

Director of Music

(Lismore 1974)

"HAPPY MUSIC"

The Royal Artillery Mounted Band

Captain T. A. Kenny, A.R.C.M., p.s.m., R.A.

Director of Music

(Lismore 1976)

"BIG BAND SOUNDS FROM THE ROYAL ARTILLERY MOUNTED BAND"

The Royal Artillery Mounted Band

Major T. A. Kenny, A.R.C.M., p.s.m., R.A.

Director of Music

(EMI 1977)

"CALL FOR THE GUNS"

The Royal Artillery Mounted Band

Captain F. A. Renton, R.A.

Director of Music

(Bandleader 1983)

== See also ==
- Bands of the Household Division (United Kingdom)
- Trooping the Colour § Massed bands troop
