= Bands of the Household Division (United Kingdom) =

Grouping of 7 bands of the British Army

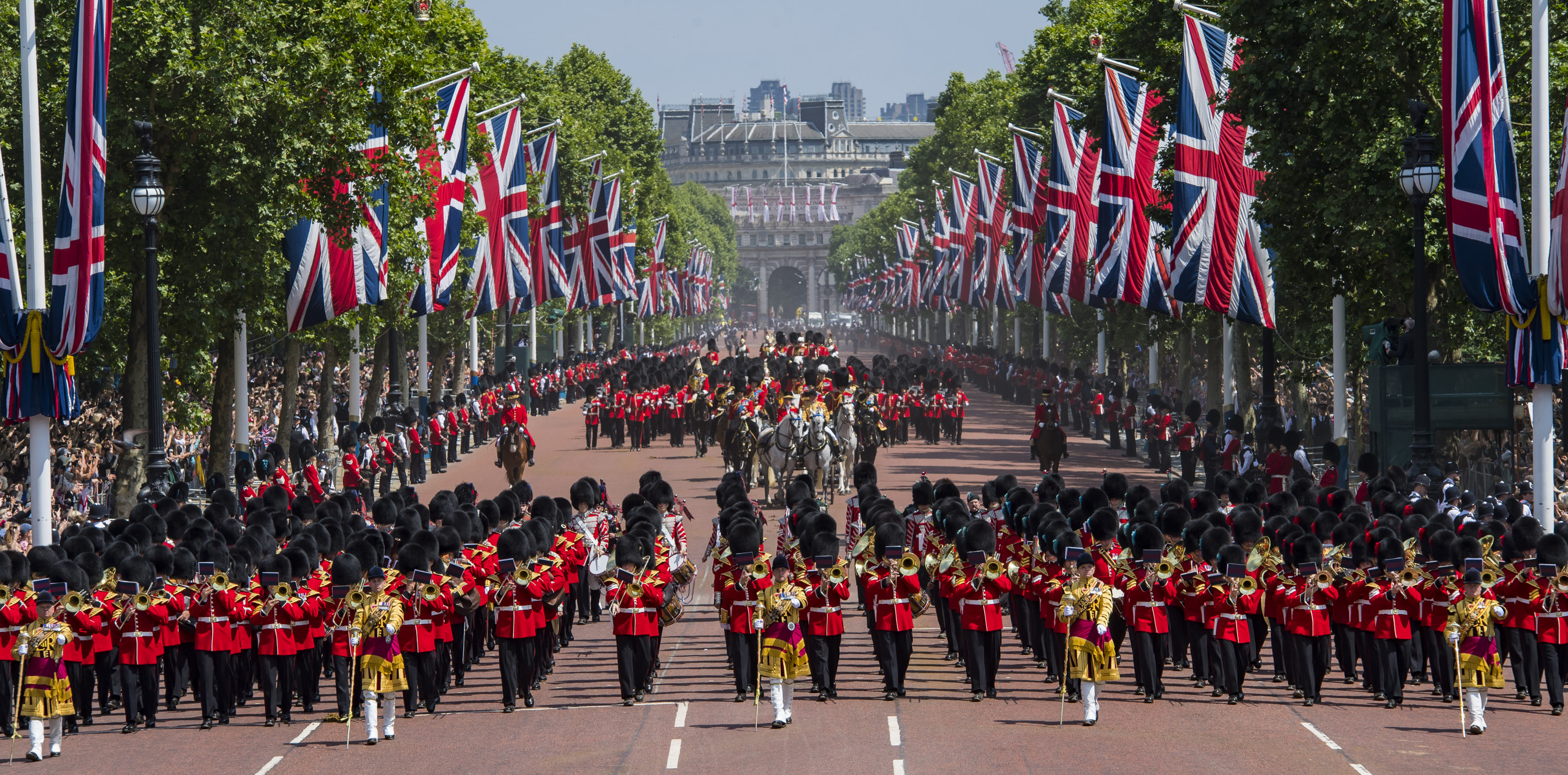
The Bands of the Household Division lead the procession of the Royal Family's return from Trooping the Colour in 2018.

The Bands of the Household Division refer to the grouping of the seven military bands of the Household Division, which forms a part of the British Army's London District. The bands belong to five regiments of foot guards and two Household Cavalry regiments.

== Bands ==
The two Household Cavalry bands are Band of the Household Cavalry and the Countess of Wessex's String Orchestra. The five bands of the foot guards are Band of the Grenadier Guards, Band of the Coldstream Guards, Band of the Scots Guards, Band of the Irish Guards and Band of the Welsh Guards.

As of 1913, the massed bands numbered around 250 musicians who are members of the Royal Corps of Army Music rather than the named regiments. These have been on show in the Changing of the Guard ceremony at Buckingham Palace. Similarly, both the Household Cavalry regiments have their own mounted bands and also their own regimental quick and slow marches.

On an unusually warm June day in London in 2023, three soldiers fainted during a rehearsal in full dress, wearing woollen uniform and bearskin, leading a commentator from The New York Times to question the sense of "soldiering on in our old, wrong clothes" in the light of climate change.

== Functions ==
=== Beating Retreat ===
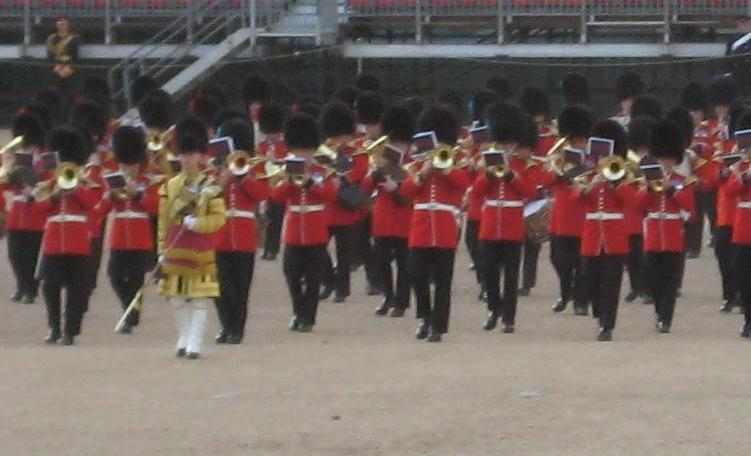
The massed bands during the Beating Retreat in 2008.

The Beating Retreat is a massive gathering of the band's of the Household Division on Horse Guards Parade. It is based on a 16th-century military ceremony in England that was first used to recall nearby patrolling units to their castle. It is held each year, on the Wednesday and Thursday evenings preceding Trooping the Colour, with the Massed Bands, Pipes and Drums and Corps of Drums of the Household Division, supported by The King's Troop and visiting military bands from around the world.

=== Trooping the Colour ===
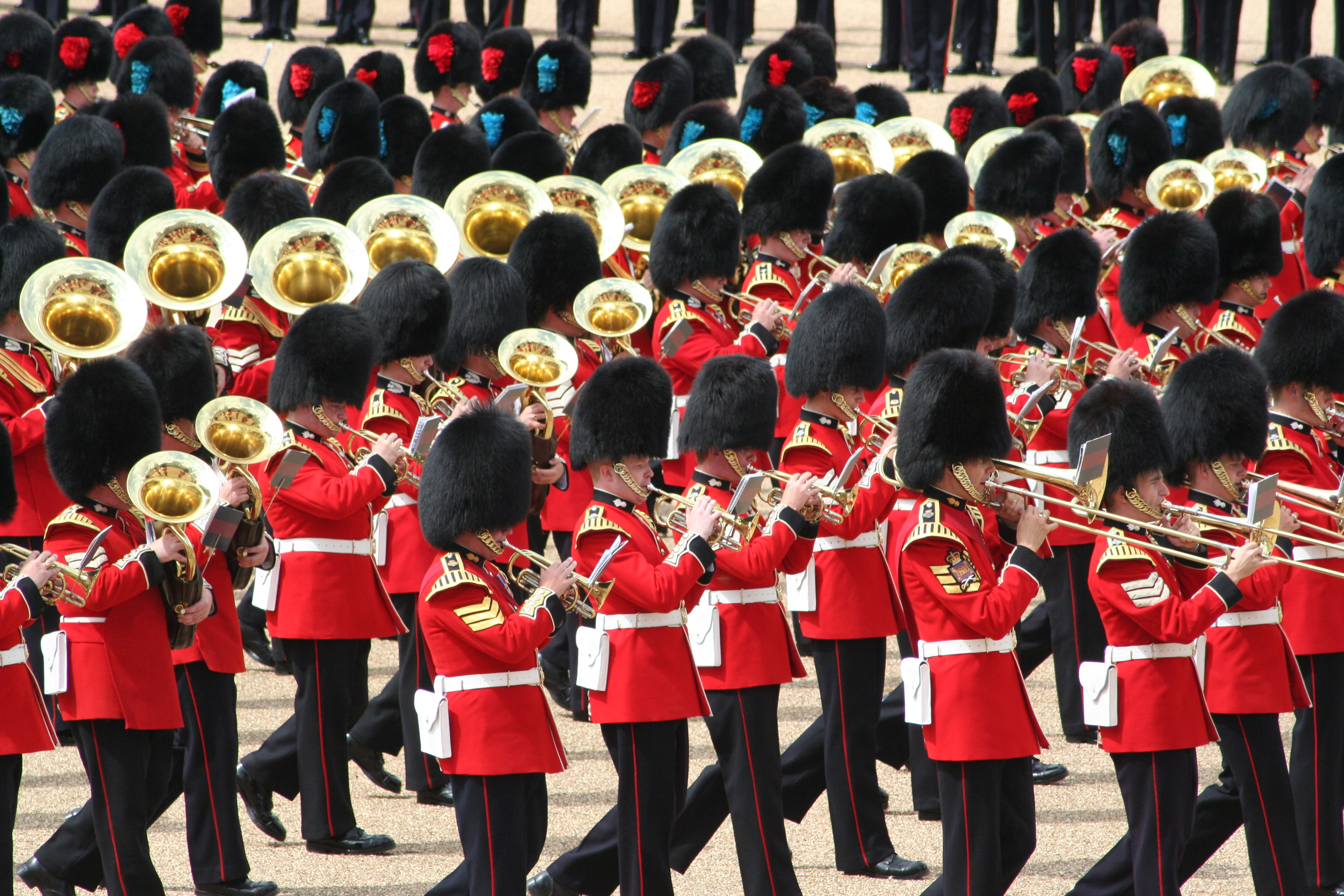
The massed bands of the Household Division during the Trooping of the Colour in 2007.

The Massed Bands and Mounted Band are featured annually at Trooping the Colour. In addition to the occasional pipers that join the bands, the presence of the Bands of the Household Division totals to approximately 400 musicians. It is responsible for performing the Royal Salute (God Save the King), providing music for the inspection of the line, the trooping through the ranks, and the march past in slow and quick time. One of the unique roles it has is the trooping of the band. This occurs once the King is seated, to which the command "Troop!" is given by the Field Officer. Upon hearing the command, three strikes on a bass drum and a playing of one note by the bands give the signal for the Massed Bands to begin. Under the command of the Senior Drum Major, the Massed Bands march and countermarch on Horse Guards Parade in slow and quick time. The slow march music is traditionally the Waltz from Les Huguenots while the quick march is generally a chosen tune. During the quick march, a lone drummer from the Corps of Drums breaks away to post himself just to the right of No. 1 Guard to sound the lone drummer's eight-bar "Drummer's Call". This initiates the Trooping of the Colour phase, by means of signalling the Captain of No. 1 Guard to cede his command to the Subaltern of No. 1 Guard. The call having been sounded, the lone drummer returns to the Massed Bands.

==== Spinwheel ====
As the Escort to the Colour slow-marches down the field towards No. 6 Guard to begin their colour trooping, the massed bands perform a manoeuvre unique to their unit and the Royal Marines known as the anti-clockwise "spinwheel". It is a 90° turn in restricted space, and is the specific responsibility of the Garrison Sergeant Major.

Lieutenant-Colonel Rodney Bashford, Director of Music for the Grenadier Guards from 1960-1970, was quoted as saying the following about on the spinwheel:

"A 'wheel' is not an easy manoeuvre with even a small body of troops, and with a block of 400 men the normal wheel is impossible. The massed band therefore pivots on its own centre, so that certain outer ranks and files march long distances in a hurry while the centre and inner ranks loiter with extreme intent, or merely mark time. Yet others not only step sideways but backwards as well. This highly complex movement is called a 'spin-wheel', the details of which can be found in no drill book or manual of ceremonial. Its complexity defies description, and if the truth were known, many of the participants know not whither they go or, on arrival, how they got there. The spin-wheel is almost an art form and each performance of it, although similar in essentials, is different in detail. Most of the performers are adjusting their actions to suit the needs of the spin-wheel of the moment, having adjusted their movements quite otherwise on other occasions."

== Senior Director of Music ==
In 1887, the first bandmaster was commissioned; Daniel Godfrey of the Grenadier Guards received the title as a personal award coming with a Jubilee Medal as part of Queen Victoria’s Golden Jubilee Honours. In the Foot Guards, personal commissions would later be granted to Lieutenant Colonel John Mackenzie Rogan and Captain Albert Williams. As a result, on 6 June 1914, the term "Director of Music" was introduced to distinguish those with a commissioned rank from warrant officers.

Since 2020, the senior director of music has become known as 'Commanding Officer, Household Division Bands'.

List of Senior Directors of Music since 1914:

| Name | Regiment | Term |
|---|---|---|
| Lieutenant Colonel John Mackenzie Rogan | Coldstream Guards | 1914–1920 |
| Captain Albert Williams | Grenadier Guards | 1920–1921 |
| Captain Frederick Wood | Scots Guards | 1921–1929 |
| Major Andrew Harris | Welsh Guards | 1929–1938 |
| Lieutenant Colonel George Miller | Grenadier Guards | 1938–1942 |
| Lieutenant Colonel Jiggs Jaeger | Irish Guards | 1963–1968 |
| Major Rodney Bashford | Grenadier Guards | 1968–1970 |
| Lieutenant Colonel James H. Howe | Scots Guards | 1970–1975 |
| Major Gerald Horabin | Irish Guards | 1975–1977 |
| Lieutenant Colonel Richard Ridings | Coldstream Guards | 1977–1985 |
| Lieutenant Colonel Derek Kimberley | Grenadier Guards | 1985–1987 |
| Lieutenant Colonel Michael Lane | Irish Guards | 1987–1989 |
| Lieutenant Colonel Peter Hannam | Welsh Guards | 1989–1993 |
| Lieutenant Colonel David Price | Scots Guards | 1993–2000 |
| Lieutenant Colonel Phillip Hills | Grenadier Guards | 2000–2002 |
| Lieutenant Colonel Andrew Chatburn | Irish Guards | 2002–2005 |
| Lieutenant Colonel Bob Owen | Scots Guards | 2005–2007 |
| Lieutenant Colonel Graham Jones | Coldstream Guards | 2007–2011 |
| Lieutenant Colonel Stephen Barnwell | Welsh Guards | 2011–2013 |
| Lieutenant Colonel Kevin Roberts | Welsh Guards | 2015–2017 |
| Lieutenant Colonel Darren Wolfendale | Irish Guards | 2017–2020 |
| Lieutenant Colonel Simon Haw | Coldstream Guards | 2020–2022 |
| Lieutenant Colonel David Barringer | Welsh Guards | 2022–2024 |
| Lieutenant Colonel Stewart Halliday | Coldstream Guards | 2024–2026 |
| Lieutenant Colonel Paul Collis-Smith | Blues and Royals | 2026–Present |

== Senior Drum Major ==
The Senior Drum Major of the Household Division is a pivotal ceremonial appointment within the British Army, responsible for leading and coordinating the Massed Bands of the Household Division during major state events, including Trooping the Colour and Beating Retreat. This role ensures the precision and uniformity of drill movements across all participating regiments.

In addition to leading performances, the Senior Drum Major oversees the training and development of other Drum Majors within the Household Division, maintaining the high standards of ceremonial excellence that the division is renowned for.

While the role does not confer a specific military rank, it carries significant ceremonial prestige and responsibility.

As of July 2025, WO2 Daniel Fairley of the Coldstream Guards occupies the role of Senior Drum Major of the Household Division. Previously, he held the role of Drum Major of the 1st Battalion Coldstream Guards. In 2018, he won the Major General's Silver Bugle Competition. His first official act as Senior Drum Major was leading the Massed Bands during the state visit of French president Emmanuel Macron in Windsor on 8 July 2025.

List of Senior Drum Majors since 1983:

| Name | Regiment | Term |
|---|---|---|
| WO2 Peter Foss | Scots Guards | 1983 |
| WO2 Dixie Dean | Irish Guards | 1984–1987 |
| WO2 Raymond Davis | Grenadier Guards | 1988 |
| WO2 Steven Ward | Coldstream Guards | 1989–1991 |
| WO2 Stan Jackson | Coldstream Guards | 1992–1994 |
| WO2 Reg Sargeant | Grenadier Guards | 1995 |
| WO2 Stephen Boyd | Irish Guards | 1996–1998 |
| WO2 Colin Ayling | Irish Guards | 1999–2001 |
| WO2 Andrew Gray | Coldstream Guards | 2002–2004 |
| WO2 Dean Colbert | Scots Guards | 2005–2007 |
| WO2 Anthony Moors | Grenadier Guards | 2008–2010 |
| WO2 Benjamin Roberts | Coldstream Guards | 2010–2012 |
| WO2 Matthew J. Betts | Grenadier Guards | 2012–2014 |
| WO2 Scott Fitzgerald | Coldstream Guards | 2014–2018, April–July 2021 |
| WO2 Damian P. Thomas | Grenadier Guards | 2018–2021 |
| WO2 Harry Sutton | Grenadier Guards | April 2021 |
| WO2 Gareth Chambers | Irish Guards | 2021–2025 |
| WO2 Daniel Fairley | Coldstream Guards | 2025–present |

== See also ==
- Mounted Band of the Household Cavalry
- Royal Air Force Music Services
- Royal Artillery Band
