= Royal Artillery Band =

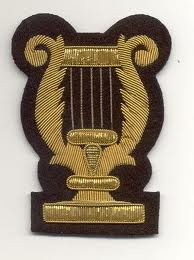
- The RA Band lyre, (No. 1 dress version) as worn only by the Royal Artillery's musicians, and on the right forearm (rather than the standard army 'bandsman's lyre' which is worn by other Army bandsmen and musicians, on the upper arm)
- Active: (1557), Sanctioned 1762–2019
- Country: Kingdom of Great Britain (1762–1800); United Kingdom (1800–2019)
- Branch: British Army
- Type: Military Band
- Part of: Corps of Army Music
- Garrison/HQ: Royal Artillery Barracks, Woolwich Garrison
- Nicknames: The Royal Artillery Band; The Band of the Royal Artillery; The Royal Artillery Orchestra; Band of the Royal Artillery; Royal Artillery Orchestra

The Royal Artillery Band was the first official, and permanent British military band (and former symphony orchestra) originating in 1557, but granted official status in 1762. Consisting of woodwind, brass, and percussion instruments (and from 1787, also stringed instruments), it represented both the Royal Regiment of Artillery, and the state. The Royal Artillery Orchestra (of the Royal Artillery Band) [disbanded on 9 February 2014] was Britain's first permanent professional orchestra. All other bands in the British Army received official, permanent status from 1763 onward. Now that the band's overall history of over four and a half centuries has come to an end, it is now claimed that the Band of the Grenadier Guards are the oldest band, with their overall history of over three hundred and thirty years. It is however, important to consider that until 1762, all military bands were formed as and when required, and then immediately disbanded when not, and that they consisted only of hired, civilian musicians; becoming integrated professional soldiers in 1762 (in the Royal Artillery) and from 1763 (in all other regiments and corps).

It was announced on 30 July 2013 that the Royal Artillery Orchestra would cease to exist in favour of a forthcoming "State String Orchestra", now known as "The Countess of Wessex's String Orchestra" following the most recent cuts to Army Music.

On Sunday 9 February 2014, the Royal Artillery Band, and a specially formed 'Veterans of the Royal Artillery Band' paraded on General Gordon's Square for the last time in their home town of Woolwich, thus ending a 252-year era, before relocating to join their regiment at Tidworth Barracks, Wiltshire The Band spent Christmas 2013 in Afghanistan, where they carried out their wartime role, as well as continuing to entertain the troops, and accompanying such celebrities as Gary Barlow, and Katherine Jenkins. Its former accommodation in the historic Georgian Royal Artillery Barracks became the home of the 24-piece Countess of Wessex's String Orchestra.

In October 2019, it was announced that the band would relocate and subsequently disband, to become one of the forming bands of British Army Band Tidworth.

== History ==
The Royal Artillery Band served as the musical arm of the artillery branch of the British Army (the Royal Regiment of Artillery).

In May 1660, the Lifeguards had their 'unofficial' kettledrums and trumpets. They also formed a band proper in 1763 after the end of the Seven Years' War. The First Foot Guards had their 'unofficial' fifes and drums in 1685 (some accounts state 1665), but their band proper was not founded until 1783 along with two other "bands of the Foot Guards". As the Grenadier Guards were not formed until after the Battle of Waterloo (from surviving troops of the First and Second Foot Guards), any claim to a band of the 'Grenadier' Guards prior to the Battle of Waterloo must be regarded as incorrect, and there are no accounts available of continuity between any Guards band which may have existed, and that of today's Grenadier Guards.

It was announced in a press release by CAMUS (now The Royal Corps of Army Music) on 29 July 2013, that all orchestral capability in British Army bands would be terminated in favour of a new 24-piece state string orchestra, formed from a nucleus of ex-Royal Artillery strings players, who had been temporarily held, in various Guards bands during the establishment period of the orchestra, and newly recruited ex-civilian string players. The new orchestra has subsequently been named "The Countess of Wessex String Orchestra".

The Royal Artillery Band and the Royal Artillery Orchestra (Britain's first, and oldest permanent orchestra) are significant in the history of British music, and in particular, of British military music, as being two of the oldest permanent musical organizations in the world, and can trace their origins as far back as 1557. The Band is closely linked to the English Artillerymen (Honourable Artillery Company), and the subsequent formation of the English Artillery regiments, which would eventually become the Royal Regiment of Artillery, and for the rise of the Royal Horse Artillery at the command of the Duke of Marlborough, and later also for the King's Troop, Royal Horse Artillery (formerly the Riding Troop).

== Origins and brief history ==
The first documented accounts of music in the "English Artillery" date back to 1557 at the battle of St. Quentin, where the Artillery had their "drumme and phife (or fyffe)". Bands known as 'Hoboys' (Fr. hautbois = oboes) of the French Horse Grenadiers appeared throughout the English cavalry and foot guards regiments during campaigns, but were disbanded immediately afterwards, as "surplus to requirements". The regiment did however, appoint permanent drummers at least from 1751, because the Royal Clothing Warrant of that year states that the drummers "were clothed in red. lined, faced, and lapelled on the breast with blue, and laced with the royal lace" (i.e. 'royal livery' as still worn today by the Household Cavalry Band). The royal lace is a 22-karat gold braid with two thin purple stripes. The English Artillery's (civilian) musicians expanded into an eight-piece ensemble consisting of 4 oboes and 4 bassoons, with each of the musicians required to also perform at Court on a stringed instrument, and increasingly at regimental dinners. The eight musicians were hired by the officers of the regiment, and disbanded after every event. It wasn't until 1762, that a total of eight musicians would be hired permanently by the Regiment, when the Royal Artillery Band was 'officially' formed at Minden, Germany. In 1717 twenty (civilian) musicians - eight wind instrumentalists and twelve drummers - from the 'Artillerie' list augmented the Royal Band of King George II aboard a barge on the River Thames, situated "close to the Royal Barge" for the first performance of the Water Music, by George Frideric Handel. The 'English' Artillery (the title 'Royal' was first used in the Regiment's appellation in 1720) raised additional musicians on ad hoc terms for occasions such as these, reverting immediately afterwards to the permanent eight. The composer Handel once again enlisted the musical services of the 'Artillerie' [Royal Artillery] on 27 April 1749 at the Royal Fireworks in Green Park. [The number of musicians augmenting the Royal Band on that occasion is unspecified, but particular mention of the "Artillerie kettledrums (of a particularly large pattern)" is nevertheless well documented. Kettledrums were confined to royal events in those days, or in battles, and only the Lifeguards otherwise used kettledrums, but of the standard size. In Germany, all kettledrummers were licensed to play them, and had to belong to the Guild of Kettledrummers]. A licence, or royal warrant, was also required to play the trumpet (which is why the cornet became the standard soprano brass instrument in the British military band. The King had also requested that "no fiđels (stringed instruments) be used" for the Royal Fireworks event, but the composer defiantly wrote on the score that all the oboe and bassoon parts should be doubled on strings (these players were again drafted from the Artillery) thereby confirming Handel's intention to use string players regardless of the King's express wish.

Prior to those given by Handel, all public performances of music in England were arranged directly by the Church, with the exceptions of processional music (royal, and military), and music for recruiting purposes. These performances of Handel's music are the first recorded in Britain, that were not connected to the Church, and among the first in Europe. Their popularity gave rise to occasional concerts before fee-paying audiences, and eventually to the existence of the first civilian professional orchestras, and the building of public concert halls. Thus the very first public bandstands date from this period.

England's Two Artillery Regiments At the formation of the now 'Royal Artillery' regiment in 1720, a special unit of artillerymen - which had been in existence since 1537 by royal charter, and which incorporated the Artillery Pikemen who date back to c. 1450 - the Honourable Artillery Company - was designated a ceremonial role, and in this capacity, they continue to exist, still maintaining their own band, the Band of the Honourable Artillery Company. It would not be until 1747 when the second regiment would be awarded the title 'Royal' (the City of London Regiment, the Royal Fusiliers). The Honourable Artillery Company (now part of the British Army Reserve) is the oldest regiment in continuous service in the British Army (the Royal Militia of the Island of Jersey, were formed 1337 but had a break in service to the crown from 1946 to 1987). The Honourable Artillery Company have always maintained through their ceremonial duties, close links with the Brigade of Guards. The Honourable Artillery's regimental band recruits a large number of ex-serving regular army musicians from the Royal Artillery, Corps of Royal Engineers and Guards as well as civilians with no previous military background. Apart from their source of musicians, there is no connection between the Honourable Artillery Company, and the Royal Artillery. In 1830 King William IV decreed that the HAC's ceremonial uniform should be modelled on that of the Grenadier Guards. The HAC are regarded as a City of London regiment, being the closest Territorial Army regiment to the "Square Mile"'. All City of London regiments (the oldest of these being the Royal Fusiliers) are entitled to wear red tunic and pelt headdress on parade. However, the original purpose of the red tunic was to denote soldiers of the King's bodyguard, which included the Artillerie Pikemen (HAC), the Yeoman of the Guard, the Yeoman Warders of the Tower of London, the Lifeguards, and the First and Second Footguards. In Scotland, the Royal Company of Archers has existed since 1676, to provide a similar function in Scotland to that of the Yeomen of the Guard, and the Yeomen Warders of the Tower Of London.

Royal Bodyguard Corps and their origins The origin of the HAC pikemen in fact predates the formation, in 1485 under the reign of King Henry VII, of the Yeoman of the Guard of the State' (the Royal Bodyguard), based at St. James's Palace, and of the Yeomen Warders of the Tower of London (the Palace and Fortress Guard), whose almost identical livery is based closely on that of the pikemen of the period, from a time when helmets (rather than the Tudor hat), and breastplates were worn by all three bodies. The Yeomen Warders do not wear the sash belt on their ceremonial uniforms, and with the exception of state occasions, their normal daily dress is the navy blue 'undress' uniform. The Yeomen Warders broke away from the body of the Yeomen of the Guard when the king gave up his residence at the Tower of London, which remained a royal palace, but still required a corps of men to guard the Tower of London. One can readily identify the Yeoman of the Guard by their shoulder belts on an otherwise identical livery. The Royal Bodyguard of the Gentlemen At Arms, although founded in 1509 is the senior corps of bodyguards to the Sovereign, by virtue of the fact that its members are gentlemen. Before the Honourable Artillery Company was incorporated into the Territorial Army (now the Army Reserve), the pikemen were disbanded, but later restored for the purpose of battle re-enactments, and entertainment, such as at military tattoos. Another royal bodyguard corps, is the Royal Company of Archers, formed in the sixteenth century in Scotland, who, in Scotland, where they share the same sovereign as England, Wales and Northern Ireland, take precedence guarding the Monarch.

Kettledrums of the Royal Regiment of Artillery The original kettledrums of the Royal Regiment of Artillery were of a uniquely large pattern, and were mounted on a carriage, designed especially for the purpose, modelled on the already extant Prussian drum carriages, and which were drawn by six white horses. The first appearance of the carriage was during the Williamite War in Ireland of 1689. In 1751 the drums were described as being painted blue at the forefront, with rims in red, and carrying the arms of Great Britain. In 1772 the carriage was employed at the funeral of the first Duke of Marlborough, John Churchill. Until 1756 it remained in permanent use, and stored in the Tower of London (where the artillery guns were made), where it was eventually destroyed by fire in the mid-nineteenth century.

Uniforms The uniform worn by the kettle-drummer, the driver, and the leader, was not the usual uniform of the Royal Artillery. Instead, they wore court livery, as is still seen worn by the drum majors and mounted musicians of the Household Cavalry, on royal and state occasions as of 2013. The entitlement of the Royal Artillery Band to wear court livery (or state dress) still remains, though nowadays it is never exercised, and is largely forgotten. A painting by J. Wootton, in the possession of Her Majesty the Queen and dated at around 1759, shows the drum carriage bearing the Artillery kettledrums, with the kettledrummer, driver, and rider dressed in state dress, and likewise, two mounted trumpeters halted behind the carriage. However, today's Royal Artillery [State] Band does maintain the distinction of being the only band in which each and every one of its musicians wears, as part of his ceremonial uniform, a band sword at the waist. These distinctive short swords were presented to the Band by the Duke of Kent, father of Queen Victoria. Band swords have been worn by other regiments' bands, and indeed by bandsmen in foreign bands, traditionally for the purpose of personal defence during active duty, in their non-combatant role.

The Royal Artillery Band is also the British Army's only band whose members wear gold belts and gold crossbelts (all other bands wear white, where a crossbelt forms part of the uniform, apart from the Corps of Royal Engineers, the Royal Corps of Signals and now amalgamated Royal Corps of Transport who wear a crossbelt containing a high proportion of gold), as well as a uniquely styled musician's lyre badge, rather than the standard army bandsman's lyre. In 1994, because of the Royal Artillery Band's role supporting the ceremonial duties of the King's Troop, Royal Horse Artillery, it was granted permanent "State" status, thereby becoming the eighth, and only non-Household Division band to carry that status. It is for this reason that the Band continued to remain at Woolwich instead of relocating with the Regiment to Larkhill - the new permanent home of the Royal Regiment. On 7 February 2012, the King's Troop relocated from St. Johns Wood, to Woolwich. The Royal Artillery Band had however, assumed temporary State status on a number of significant occasions during the past. The Band will cease to be a State band in 2014, when, owing to funding cuts announced in 2013 in Army Music, it will lose its string capability, be reduced in number, and relocate to Tidworth, in Hampshire.

Both the Royal Regiment and the Royal Artillery Band have always been particularly important to the British monarchs, since the Prince of Wales (later King George IV), first regularly sang with the Band. It was George IV who was responsible for the Royal Artillery Orchestra's regular concerts, given at Windsor Castle - the first concerts in Britain performed by a professional orchestra (leading to the famous Woolwich Town Hall concerts, which continued until 2011). Indeed, Her Majesty the Queen, Queen Elizabeth II, as well as holding the honorary rank of Colonel-In-Chief of several other regiments, also holds the prestigious rank of "Captain General" both of the Royal Artillery and of the Honourable Artillery Company.

Fifes Fifers were added at the instigation of the officers of the Regiment to the Royal Artillery Corps of Drummers in 1748 on a permanent basis, and this unit continued until after the Crimean War, when it became a bugle band. It soon became apparent that the musicians were becoming bored with the limited five-note compass of the instrument, and so they persuaded the instrument maker, Henry Distin to supply them with sets of his newly patented chromatic attachments, to enable the bugle to have the same compass as the cornet. This proved very successful, particularly after the furore created on Woolwich Front Parade, when two buglers performed the Mess Call, playing 'The Roast Beefe of Olde England' in (inadvertent) two-part harmony. From that time, the 'keyed bugle' went into production. In Europe, and among the English troops, fifers, drummers (and pipers) have always been fighting soldiers, acting additionally as stretcher bearers as necessary. There is no record, however, that this was ever the case in the Royal Artillery.

Place of origin of the Royal Artillery Band Towards the end of the Seven Years' War (1756 - 1763), the 'modern' Royal Artillery Band was founded and formed by Lieutenant Colonel W. Phillips, at the Battle of Minden (1759) in Germany. It was granted official status in 1762. Phillips had much experience of seeing and listening to the Prussian bands, on which he unsurprisingly modelled his band. By the following year, the (German) musicians - of whom one, John Michael Bach, was the son of the third cousin to Johann Sebastian Bach - were now permanent paid members of the British Army, stationed at Woolwich, to the south east of London, at the home of the Royal Regiment of Artillery. Prior to this period all bands were raised only for special occasions and purposes, after which, they were immediately disbanded. The bands were not paid for by the State, but by the officers of their particular regiments. Article 3 of the Royal Artillery Band's 'Articles of Agreement' of 1762 state that the [RA] musicians "will be looked upon as actual soldiers and cannot leave the regiment without a formal discharge." In 1783, we see the first mention of "three Foot Guards bands, each of 8 performers."

Permanent home of the Royal Artillery Band (until 2014) Woolwich has been the home of the Artillery since the fifteenth century, as an important defence position guarding the port of London, and the Tower of London - the original home of the Royal Arsenal, where everything associated with artillery and grenades was produced, before a new arsenal was built at Woolwich. In 2007 the Royal Regiment left Woolwich, where it had been based since 1712 (receiving its 'Royal' title in 1714). The Band, which since 1993, as with all military bands in the army, had become absorbed into the newly formed Corps of Army Music (now the Royal Corps of Army Music). As a Corps of Army Music unit, many of the band's traditions and customs changed, in order for it to become a standard band of the Corps (e.g. no longer were B-Flat bass tubas positioned in the front rank of the band, belts and cross belts were temporarily changed to the Corps' white colour, and band swords were temporarily removed, while the tempo marking for its quick marches was changed from crotchet equals 116 beats per minute to 120). The band moved to its new permanent base at Larkhill, until its eventual merging to form a new style 'British Army band' to satisfy further cuts to army music.

== Development and eventual absolution ==
By November 1787, the Band (by now stationed at Woolwich) was under the command of its 'Master-Musician' Friederich Wiele, also an outstanding violinist. Among the eight musicians, there now numbered five Englishmen, and all of the musicians were capable of performing on stringed, as well as on wind, instruments. In 1795 the bandmaster George McKenzie described the band as possessing fifteen musicians. The rank of 'Musician' was still peculiar to the Royal Artillery alone; the rank of 'Private' was usual in all other bands, with the term 'bandsmen' used instead of 'performers' or 'musicians'. (During the 'Options For Change' discussions between 1993 and 1996 it was finally decided to abolish the system of regimental bands of the line, and to retain only the staff- and corps- bands. Today, there are no 'bandsmen' in the British Army, as those remaining in service all hold the appointment 'Musician').

In 1802 the Band had recorded twenty-one performers (the increase was probably owing to the absorption into its ranks of the Band of the Royal Irish Artillery, on its disbandment in 1801). The proficiency of the musicians led to the desirability of more bands to entertain the numerous artillery regiments of the day. King Louis 14th of France devised his own orchestra, the '24 Violinists of the King' based on the military orchestras of the day (in 1626) which infers that either those extant in Germany, or that of the still unofficial Royal Artillery Band were seen as models. Until the death of Queen Victoria, and for a great many years beyond, the standard of the Royal Artillery Orchestra remained unsurpassed in Britain. The Orchestra continued to be regularly engaged, by royal command, to play during and after state banquets at Buckingham Palace and Windsor Castle. Many first performances were given by the Orchestra, including, in 1868, the overture to 'Die Meistersinger von Nűrnberg' conducted by James Smyth. This piece would not be performed in this country by a civilian orchestra until the Philharmonic Orchestra of London included the work in a programme in 1882.

For almost five years (1805–1810), the Band was under the charge of Colonel Charles A. Quist, the Commanding Officer, even though a Herr M. Eisenherdt had been appointed as Master Musician. Colonel Quist, who by 1810 had assumed the appointment of Band Commandant suggested the initiation of a series of vocal and orchestral concerts, known as the "Royal Artillery Concerts". These were held every week during the winters, at the RA Officers' Mess, and were conducted by some of the most distinguished musicians in London.

While under the direction of George McKenzie, Master Musician (1810–1845), King William IV, having heard the Band play at the launching ceremony in 1883, of a ship in Woolwich, commanded the Band to play at the royal palace within the very same week (George McKenzie was appointed at the insistence of King George IV to Lord Bloomfield). King William wanted to present the Band with a pair of sterling silver kettledrums, but was disappointed when they were instead made of copper, enamelled, and "beautifully painted", so he also presented the officers with a superb candelabra. The inscription on the kettledrums reads "Presented by His Majesty King William IV., 1833)." In 1815 the Band of the Coldstream Guards had risen to twenty-two 'bandsmen', while in 1812, it is also recorded that the Royal Artillery Band comprised thirty-eight 'musicians'. By regulations, all bands, except that of the Royal Artillery which was not controlled by the War Office, were restricted to ten players and a bandmaster in 1821. In 1823, regulations permitted fourteen players, by which time, the Royal Artillery Band numbered thirty-nine. At this time, the finest bands in the kingdom were the Royal Artillery Band under George Mackenzie, and the Court Military Band of George IV, directed by Christian Kramer. The Royal Artillery Band followed immediately behind the coffin guard during the funeral procession of the Duke of Wellington, in 1852.

The nineteenth century was a period of experiment and refinement among the instruments of outdoor music. The most successful of these instruments were the saxophones (c. 1840), patented by Adolphe Sax, which although are regarded popularly as 'woodwind', are actually single-reed brass instruments. The Royal Artillery Band were quick to adopt the alto and tenor members from the family of nine instruments, which became useful in supporting the clarinets.

Standardization of military bands, including instrumentation, sheet music, and drill, was an obvious requirement if different bands were to perform together. Carlo Boosé, Bandmaster of the Scots Guards (himself German) recognized the need for uniformity of instrumentation. In 1845 he produced the first British publication of a military band arrangement, which was received with such great enthusiasm, that the firm Boosey & Co. provided the funds to establish 'Boosé's Military Journal'.

The number of musicians in the Royal Artillery Band had risen to over seventy by 1856, and by 1890, there were over a hundred performers. In 1856, the Duke of Cambridge proposed the acquisition of Kneller Hall, at Whitton, near Twickenham, for the permanent use of training Army musicians. Approval was received from all commanding officers, by way of a circular, on 4 December, and the first music class was scheduled to take place on 1 January 1857. The Royal Military School of Music was initially supported well by the majority of military bands, but with only four pupils to represent the Household Cavalry and Foot Guards. However, both the Royal Artillery and Royal Engineers Bands continued to train their musicians exclusively at the Royal Artillery Junior Musicians Troop at Woolwich – a practice that would continue until the 1980s, later also including musicians from the Band of the Royal Signals. (The Corps of the Royal Signals developed from the Royal Engineers Signals Unit, and was established in 1920). In 1894 there were a hundred and eighty-eight bands in the British Army, and this rose to a hundred and ninety-eight in 1926. It can be seen that for a small town to host this prestigious band was a big event, such as when Herne Bay invited the band to open its newly extended Central Bandstand in 1932. Over the next sixty-seven years, the number of bands would decline.

At the height of Queen Victoria's reign, the number of band personnel in the Royal Artillery rose to over one hundred and fifty, including its 'symphony orchestra' of over eighty musicians. The massed bands of the Royal Regiment of Artillery must therefore have been a truly formidable sight, particularly in the company of the Royal Artillery Mounted Band "The largest mounted band ever seen" (reprinted in 1984 in The Times), and the various other minor artillery bands that also existed. At the International Music Festival in Le Havre in 1925 the Royal Artillery Band won three first prizes, plus the coveted Conductor's Medal. By the end of the British Empire, its size had reduced, but it continued to grow again, until, in 1977, the band comprised one hundred and twenty musicians, and on special occasions could be seen on parade with the regiment's massed bands – the Royal Artillery Mounted Band (forty-seven strong), and the (forty strong) Royal Artillery Alanbrooke Band). In 1980, the Army Board had come to the conclusion that the Royal Artillery Band, the Royal Artillery Mounted Band, and the Royal Artillery Alanbrooke Band would be required to adopt a wartime role. At that time, there were sixty-eight bands in the Army, and apart from the Royal Artillery bands, all of them fulfilled the traditional wartime role as stretcher bearers. It was decided that in the case of the Royal Artillery bands, the musicians would be trained as drivers, and all three bands quickly ensured that their members were trained and qualified as HGV 2 drivers, with additional experience driving 10-tonne Monarch trucks during Operation Lionheart in 1982.

During the Second World War, the Royal Artillery Band was allotted a war station in Yorkshire, where it was responsible for tours in the Northern and Scottish Commands, and also completed a single tour of Northern Ireland. Towards the end of the war, the Band returned to London to serve the South Eastern Command, where it also provided a small detachment at Watford. There even existed a 'Royal Artillery Travelling Orchestra', which was conducted by the composer Robert Still, to support the main band, by allowing them to concentrate on their regimental and ceremonial engagements. The war years saw many associations between the Band and fellow Gunner celebrities, such as Max Jaffa, Eric Fenby, Harry Secombe, Frankie Howerd and Spike Milligan, as well as recordings and broadcasts with the Orchestra, for Vera Lynn, which it shared with the RAF Concert Orchestra, Mantovani and his orchestra, and Roland Shaw and his orchestra. Harry Secombe, Frankie Howerd and Spike Milligan all completed their war training at Woolwich after enlisting into the Royal Artillery. The band's association with Harry Secombe would continue almost until his retirement, while Spike Milligan would occasionally be reunited with them.

After the war, the Band resumed its enviable position of being the band of choice for the most prestigious of national occasions. One of the most notable occasions took place on 30 November 1954, when the Royal Artillery Band gave a concert at the Royal Albert Hall in honour of their great admirer, Sir Winston Churchill, on his 80th birthday.

Exceptional musicians have always been drawn to the Royal Artillery Band and Royal Air Force Bands, but of particular interest are those who would become famous in Britain and the world, as composers, solo performers, and as music directors (M.D.s) or bandleaders. Many established professional players from London's orchestras joined the band upon call-up at the start of World War 2, such as the celebrated French horn player, Alan Civil (RA Woolwich), but towards the end of the war, and for the remainder of the National Service years, several musicians started their careers at Woolwich, to become famous after they left the band. These included the composers Gordon Langford and Harrison Birtwistle, the guitarists Julian Bream and John Williams, the jazz pianist and television composer Johnny Pearson (from 1965 - 1981 M.D. for BBC TV's "Top Of The Pops", pianist in John Schroeder's "Sounds Orchestral", and M.D. to Cilla Black), the jazz flautist / saxophonist / film and television composer [Patrick] John Scott (Johnny Scott & The Scottmen), the jazz harpist, David Snell, and Ian Fraser, who was the most honoured musician in the history of British television, receiving 32 Emmy nominations and winning 11 times, plus and Oscar for his work on Leslie Bricusse's "Scrooge". He also composed music for films, and was M.D. to many popular singers, including Julie Andrews. Fraser was the last person to conduct "White Christmas" for Bing Crosby during the singer's last TV special in 1977. Having composed many film scores in the U.K., John Scott went to live and work in Hollywood as a film composer, but in his earlier days, he made several successful singles as a jazz flautist and was the saxophonist in several of John Barry's score for the James Bond films in the sixties, including in "Goldfinger".

Today's busy schedule includes regular public duties, such as the Changing of The Guard, and investitures at Buckingham Palace and Windsor Castle, as the musicians continue to support Royal Artillery regiments throughout the country, appear at ambassadorial duties worldwide, and play at private engagements (necessary for providing an income towards instrument purchase and repairs, and new music scores and parts). Royal Artillery musicians have performed in the United States, Canada, South Africa, Africa, New Zealand, Hungary, China, Switzerland, Germany, France, Italy, Slovenia, throughout Scandinavia, and the Benelux countries, and more recently in Russia for the 2011 Moscow Tattoo. The military band has also performed on a number of occasions at the Edinburgh Tattoo to a worldwide television audience. Presently, owing to the size of the Royal Artillery Band, it can no longer simultaneously provide an orchestra and marching band, however, the full orchestra continues to maintain symphonic capabilities. Until recently, and since 1993, the only other band capable of providing a full symphony orchestra was the Band of the Royal Engineers, at Chatham. Other ensembles currently provided by the Band include a concert band, a brass quintet, a string quartet and sextet, a jazz quartet, a woodwind quintet, and a contemporary Rock orchestra called 'Voice of the Guns'. The Orchestra appeared in 2011 as 'House Band' at the first revival of the Royal Tournament at Earls Court, London. The marching bands taking part were those of the Household Cavalry, the Royal Marines, and the Central Band of the Royal Air Force.

Notably, the Orchestra has toured with various musical celebrities in the recent past, including Nigel Kennedy, Sir Harry Secombe, Anne Shelton, Moira Anderson, Carlos Bonnell, John Ogden, Stephen Isserlis, Hayley Westenra, David Russell, and Semprini, to name a few. There is evidence that the Royal Artillery Orchestra, or musicians from its ranks, are paving the way towards more involvement between military musicians and contemporary artists in a commercial capacity, including, so far, with Stanley Cornfield, and the Strawbs, with Rick Wakeman (Stanley Cornfield: The Seawall [CD]; The Strawbs 40th Anniversary Volume 2 [CD & DVD]). This welcome trend is not however, completely unprecedented, as members of the Royal Artillery Band, and Royal Artillery Mounted Band, augmented the London Symphony Orchestra on their first 'classic rock' album on LP, in 1976. The original gatefold album sleeve includes a photograph of timpanist John Keel in ceremonial dress.

The founder, director and conductor of the New Sousa Band, Keith Brion embarked on a series of recordings of the complete works of John Philip Sousa in 2000 on the Naxos label. The series is expected to reach sixteen volumes, and encompass marches, waltzes, operatic, and concert works, by the finest military bands and orchestras. Volumes 1 to 8 were recorded by the Royal Artillery Band, conducted by Keith Brion.

In addition to the Royal Artillery Band ("Band of the Royal Regiment of Artillery"), there existed the Royal Artillery Band (Mounted Portion), the Royal Horse Artillery Band, the Royal Artillery Mounted Band (Woolwich), The Royal Artillery Mounted Band (Aldershot) [= later, the Royal Artillery Mounted Band], the Royal Garrison Artillery Band, the Royal Artillery (Portsmouth) Band [= the Royal Artillery B.A.O.R Band = later, the Royal Artillery Alanbrooke Band], the Royal Artillery Mounted Band, and the Royal Artillery Alanbrooke Band. Of these, the Royal Artillery Mounted Band ("...the largest mounted band ever seen", according to The Times, in June 1984) existed as auxiliary bands, and minor staff bands, together with the Royal Artillery Band (Woolwich) until the Mounted Band was disbanded in 1984, and the Alanbrooke Band in 1993. These two bands had, for a number of years, alternately filled the "B.A.O.R." (British Army of the Rhine) post, at West Riding Barracks, Dortmund, until the withdrawal of the Regiment from there. The changeover occurred every five years, and the band returning to the United Kingdom, was likewise stationed for five years at Larkhill, Wiltshire. On occasion, these three bands would unite, as 'massed bands', of up to 197 performers, and more if the massed bands comprised these with the Territorial Army's Artillery bands, and the Band of the Honourable Artillery Company, such as on Horseguards Parade in Whitehall. The three regular bands also appeared on two separate years as massed bands at the Edinburgh Tattoo.

On 9 February 2014, The Royal Artillery Band (Woolwich) paraded for the last time, on Gordon Square, Woolwich, in preparation for the move of the Royal Regiment of Artillery to its new headquarters at Larkhill, Wiltshire. However, the Band was relocated to Tidworth, close by. The now Royal Artillery (Tidworth) Band continued to serve in Tidworth through further cuts and changes to army music, which included a transformation from 'military band' (i.e. with woodwind, brass and percussion instruments) to a brass band, and eventual talk of the brass band being reduced further to a quintet. By early October 2019, it was announced by the Corps of Army Music (CAMus), that band would be relocated, along with two other bands, to form a new group of bands in Tidworth.

== Uniforms ==
The present uniform of the band was created for the massed bands of the Royal Regiment of Artillery for the official birthday parade for Her Majesty the Queen, on Horse Guards Parade, in June 1986. The tunic replaced the No. 1 Dress Jacket, and was quilt-lined. More elaborate gold braiding was added, with emphasis on rank of the wearer. Patent leather boots were worn by the 'other ranks' for the first time. As the famous Royal Artillery Mounted Band had been disbanded in 1984, the only other regular Army band to appear on that parade, was the Royal Artillery Alanbrooke Band (disbanded in 1993). From the Territorial Army, the Regimental Band of the Honourable Artillery Company and South Notts Hussars (RHA) Band contributed to the massed Artillery bands on that occasion.

The Royal Artillery musicians' uniforms are based on the officers' pattern ceremonial uniforms of the past. From its uniform are derived (in some cases almost identically) the uniforms of the bands of the Royal Canadian Artillery, the Royal Australian Artillery, the Royal New Zealand Artillery, and the Royal Netherlands Army Artillery (indeed the latter even have their equivalent of the King's Troop Royal Horse Artillery). Slight differences are obviously evident between the nations, for example, the Royal Canadian Artillery Band wear white plumes, and do not wear spurs. The Royal Artillery Busby (based on the standard Hussars-pattern head dress) was also adopted by the Corps of Royal Engineers and the Royal Corps Signals, from the Royal Engineers, came the unusual busby as worn by the Royal Air Force Music Service until 2011.

== Ceremonial dress ==
=== Head dress ===
RHA officers' pattern sealskin (formerly bearskin) busby (not to be confused with the bearskin cap, as worn by soldiers in the guards, and infantry), with tall white plume (ostrich feathers) attached to ferrule to the top of the front. Lanyard looped around cap. Red busby bag apparently, during the Napoleonic period, the bag could contain dried fruit (raisins) for sustenance when times were hard. It is also said that the other ranks' horse hair plumes were used in place of a shaving brush. Black leather chin strap faced with brass links. Only worn by King's Troop Royal Horse Artillery officers, and Royal Artillery directors of music.

=== Tunic ===
RA officers'-pattern ceremonial tunic (worn only by Directors of Music) in navy blue felt, quilt lined. Standing collar, fastened with hooks, and cuffs in scarlet felt, with scarlet piping to front button-hole edge. Ornate edging, and 'Austrian knots' in 18K gold twine braide. RA officers'-pattern bomb badges sewn onto collar. Gold epaulettes. Worn on the right arm is the unique Royal Artillery musician pattern lyre, in 18K gold wire on a black felt background. All other musicians in the British Army wear the standard bandsman pattern lyre, with the exception of musicians from The Household Division who do not wear a lyre on their uniforms.

=== Accessories ===
Crossbelt

Leather, covered with 18K gold panel and braiding, attached to which is an RA officers'-pattern embroidered pouch at rear.

Waistbelt and swordbelt with sling

In matching pattern to the crossbelt (above).

Trousers

Navy blue cavalry-pattern tight-fitting cavalry-style pantaloons, with wide RA stripe in scarlet felt sewn onto outside of each leg. Leather straps with buckles are attached to the bottoms of the legs, which fasten under the arch of the boots.

Footwear

Cavalry officers'-pattern George boots in black patent leather, with box fittings in heels, for detachable silver spurs. Boots are secured by leather straps attached to hose.

== Other ranks ==
=== Ceremonial dress ===
Head dress

Other Ranks: RA sealskin sable busby (often artificial nowadays), with six-inch scarlet plume (horse hair) slotted into brass plume holder, in the form of a grenade, with the old-pattern RFA cap badge depicted on the 'bomb'. The plume (formerly scarlet cut-feathers) is held closed by a brass ring (a thicker ring is used on the Drum Major's headdress). No lanyard attached to cap. Red busby bag (as above). Black leather chin strap, faced with brass links. A similar busby is worn by the musicians of the Royal Engineers and Royal Signals bands, with busby bags in their own Corps' colours, with the plume mounted in a similar plume holder to the side of the cap. The Bandmaster's busby is similar to that worn by the Director of Music, but the white plume is smaller. At various times during the Band's history, other forms of head dress were worn, according to fashion. These included the bearskin cap (similar to that worn by Guardsmen), the shako, and the home service helmet. Throughout the 1950s and early 1960s, the RA No. 1 Dress peaked cap was worn as the sole form of ceremonial head dress. Unlike in all other bands, the Royal Artillery Band has always included a bandmaster as assistant to the Director of Music. Since the reorganization of bands, and the foundation of the Corps of Army Music, a bandmaster has been appointed to each band in the standard role of Training Officer / Musician.

Tunic

Bandsman-pattern navy blue felt tunic, quilt lined. Standing collar, fastened with hooks, and cuffs in scarlet felt, with scarlet piping to front button-hole edge. Ornate edging (with emphasis on rank held reflected in gauge), and 'Austrian knots' in 18K gold twine braide (with emphasis on rank held reflected in gauge). Other ranks'-pattern RA bomb badges (gold twine) sewn onto collar. Worn on the right arm is the unique RA Musician lyre badge, in 18K gold twine on black felt (all other British army musicians wear the standard Army bandsman-pattern lyre badge).

=== Accessories ===
Crossbelt

Leather, covered with 18K gold panel and braiding, attached to which is a cavalry standard-pattern pouch at rear, onto which is mounted a brass RA gun badge. Depending on the instrument played, a crossbelt may cause damage to the instrument, or be restrictive to movement. Therefore, not all musicians wear a crossbelt. Similarly, certain musicians will be seen to wear a protective bib, or apron, normally in a complementary colour to their individual band uniform.

The purpose of the crossbelt pouch was so that an officer or senior rank could post an important message into the courier's pouch, by unhooking the leather tab, inserting the note, then securing the flap, in the briefest possible time. The courier would then ride off at speed to deliver it. In some bands - a tradition still held by the bands of the footguards, larger pouches were used to store march cards (cards measuring approximately 180 mm × 130 mm on which the individual instrumental sheet-music parts are pasted). The march cards are held, to enable the player to read his part, in a heavy duty clip (known as a 'lyre') which is attached to his instrument. At the back of the lyre, but facing forward, is placed the 'backing card', to hide the music from the view of the public. The backing card normally shows the 'cap badge' of the regiment or corps.

Swordbelt

In matching pattern to the crossbelt (above).

Band sword

A unique-pattern short sword hooked onto the swordbelt. The hook protrudes through the tunic, allowing the sword to hang visibly. Only worn by the Royal Artillery Band. The sword has never been worn by other Royal Artillery bands. The Bandmaster, Drum Major, and Band Sergeant Major carry the standard British Army sword, as worn by warrant officers.

Trousers

Navy blue cavalry-pattern tight-fitting cavalry-style pantaloons, with wide RA stripe in scarlet felt sewn onto outside of each leg. Leather straps with buckles are attached to the bottoms of the legs, which fasten under the arch of the boots.

Footwear

Cavalry-pattern George boots in black leather (nowadays patent leather), with silver spurs screwed into the heels of boots. Boots are secured by leather straps attached to hose.

== Drum major ==
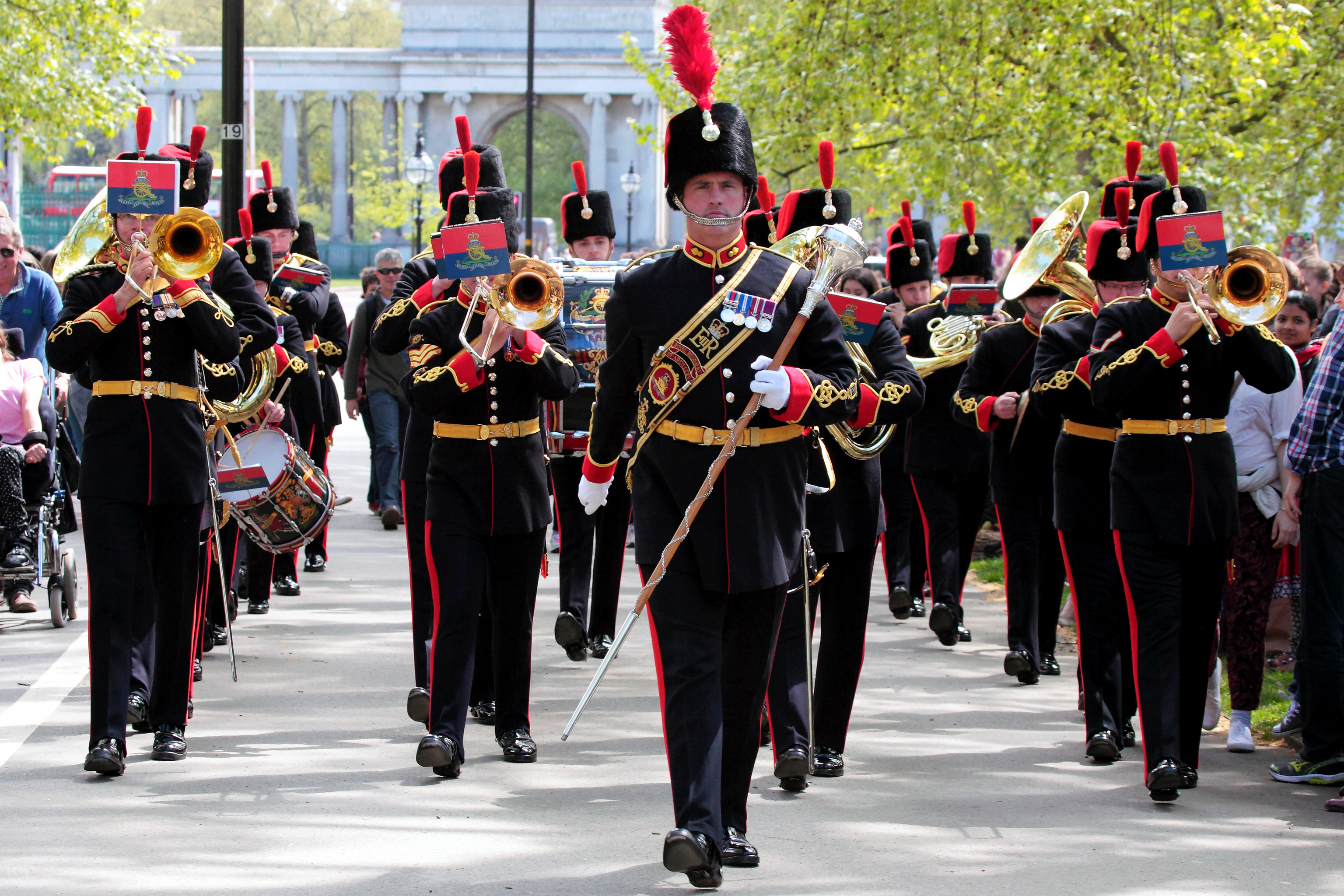
The band's drum major leading a parade.

The drum major, as the figurehead, and leader of the marching band, historically always wore a more flamboyant uniform to emphasize his special status. Today, in the Royal Artillery, this is shown by the amount of gold braid and facings on his uniform, an elaborately decorated crossbelt, and a heavier plume ring, holding closed a taller scarlet cut-feather plume. He carries a mace, which is used to signal his commands to the musicians, in conjunction with vocal commands as required. The signals are closely observed by the bass drummer, who then administers a drum signal which is audible to every musician. This is necessary, because the musicians must concentrate on reading from their sheet music parts. There was a period when the RA Drum Majors wore, contrary to the rest of the Band, a tall bearskin cap (similar to that worn by the Guards regiments), with a plume rising up one side of the cap, and draped round the crown, and down the other side.

Following the Drum Major's command a mace signal indicates to the drummers (bass and side drums) when to commence the drum rolls. In the tradition of most regiments, Royal Artillery troops step off after two sets of three-pace drum rolls are sounded, in quick march time. Guards regiments traditionally step off after one set of five-pace rolls. When the Royal Artillery Band appears on parade at the same time as troops and bands from the Guards and other regiments, a seven-pace drum roll is sometimes used to differentiate between themselves, and all other bands, with the Royal Artillery taking precedence. With the exception of the Guards' five-pace roll, which equals six beats, all other combinations of rolls consist of eight beats (or two bars in quadruple time).

== Master Musicians, Band Masters, Directors of Music (1762–1994) ==
In 1994 the Royal Artillery Band and Orchestra were absorbed in the new Corps of Army Music, which meant that, as with all the bands in the Corps, its musicians could be borrowed by other bands, or be posted to other bands as the need arose. Likewise, musicians from other bands could find themselves playing in the Royal Artillery Band. Effectively, this spelt the end of individuality of sound of all bands, and for this reason, only directors of music, and bandmasters from the original Royal Artillery Band are below.

- 1762: 'Officially recognized' band is founded by Lieutenant-Colonel W. Phillips at Minden
- 1771–1774: Anthony Rocca is appointed Master-Musician, or Band Master (not to be confused with the later-designated role of 'Bandmaster' at Warrant Officer Class 1 level)
- 1774–1777: Georg Kühler, Master-Musician (who later styled himself as 'George Kealer')
- 1777–1802: Friederich Wiele, Master
- 1802–1805: Herr G. Schnuphass
- 1805–1810: Herr Eisenherdt, Master (but with the Commanding Officer, Colonel Charles A. Quist in charge)

1810–1845: George McKenzie, Master of the Band (a former orchestra leader, Mackenzie was devoted to the development and success of the Orchestra)

1845–1865: William George Collins, Master of the Band (a corporal in the Royal Artillery Band)

1865–1881: James Smyth, Band Master (pronounced 'Smith'. Smyth conducted the premiere British performance of the overture to 'The Master Singers of Nuremberg' by Wagner in 1868)

Smyth possibly felt that the style 'Master of the Band' was old-fashioned, and could have been influential in effecting its change to 'Band Master.

1881: - An interregnum under Albert Mansfield, Acting Bandmaster following a directive to appoint an established conductor of outstanding reputation

1881–1907: Cavaliere Ladislao Joseph Phillip Paul Zavertal, Bandmaster (Zavertal introduced the 'New World Symphony' by Dvorak, and Smetana's overtures and incidental music to 'The Bartered Bride' and 'Vitava' to British audiences, and raised the standard of the Orchestra to an unprecedented high level, leading to frequent royal command performances by Queen Victoria, whose mother, the Duchess of Kent, composed the majestic 'Royal Artillery Slow March'). Zavertal received the following honours: the Jubillee Medal; the Royal Victorian Order; Cavaliere of the Crown of Italy; Order of the Redeemer (from the King of Greece); Knight Commander Royal Order of Takoya (Serbia), the Commander's Star of the Osmanieh (from the Sultan of Turkey), Society of St. Cecilia of Rome (elected member) and the Saxe-Coburg- Ernestine Order of Art and Science

A conductor of international fame. Prior to his appointment, the Duke of Cambridge, 'Commanding-in-Chief' had issued a Horse Guards letter to every commanding officer praising Kneller Hall's work in producing British bandmaster for the Army: "I am gratified at finding that the system of training regimental musicians for promotion to the situation of Bandmaster - to the exclusion of civilians and foreigners - has worked so well..." The appointment of Zavertal was in fact permitted by the Duke of Cambridge, who was not actually 'Commanding-in-Chief', but rather 'Colonel-in-Chief'. For the first time, we see the term 'Bandmaster' applied to the Master of the Band, which is similar to the current appointment in appearance only. Today, 'bandmaster' is an auxiliary position, held by a Warrant Officer, Class 1.

1907–1936: Major Edward C. Stretton, Director of Music

Appointed for the "continued prestige he will bring the Band" (under Cavaliere (Sir) Zavertal's command, the Orchestra became internationally known, and little emphasis was given to maintaining the standard of the Wind Band. Zavertal was not himself, keen to appear on parades, and was happy to leave this side of the organization to the command of his SNCOs. In 1918, Stretton was awarded the MVO, by King George V).

1936–1955: Lieutenant-Colonel Owen W. Geary, Director of Music

1955–1966: Major Sidney Victor Hays, Director of Music

The recordings made by the band under the directorship of Major Hays are among the most sought-after by collectors of military band music worldwide.

- 1966–1976: Major Robert Quinn
- 1976–1985: Lieutenant-Colonel Stanley William Patch

Under Colonel Patch's baton, the Band excelled at light music in particular, and his authoritative knowledge of the music and life of the Strauss family was popularly regarded.

1985–1988: Lieutenant-Colonel Frank Anthony Renton

Colonel Renton later became Principal Director of Music, British Army. An ex-director of music, of both the Royal Artillery Mounted Band, and the Royal Artillery Alanbrooke Band (the only director of music to hold the distinction of having served in all three bands of the Royal Regiment), who is widely regarded as one of the finest conductors to have served in the British Army.

1988–1992: Major Clarence Roberts Collier Garrity

Ex-Director of Music, the Royal Artillery Alanbrooke Band. A consummate composer, arranger, and dance-band performer (saxophone & keyboard).

1992–1996: Major Terence Sean Davis

The final director of music to command the band before its absorption into the Corps of Army Music (CAMus) in 1994.

The 'Bandmaster' in today's British military band is the 'Assistant Conductor' to the Director of Music, and represents him in his absence. Among the performers of the band are the instrumental section leaders, whose job it is, to ensure a cohesive style of playing within their own sections, and where applicable, to be able to play solos. In an orchestra, there is the addition of the Leader (Principal First Violin), who on occasion must be able to direct the orchestra (from the violin), or conduct. An unusual aspect of military bands is that, by necessity, a leader or section leader is selected for being the best exponent on his chosen instrument. The situation arises therefore, on a day-to-day basis, that an ensemble, band, or orchestra, must perform under the command of a musician of any rank, notwithstanding the fact that there may be senior-ranking musicians playing within the sections. The musician in charge is also completely responsible in rehearsal. Such a situation is often difficult to comprehend or accept, even from fellow servicemen. However, it should be remembered, that the musician in charge is representing the Director of Music. Senior-ranking members of the band, although in this case under the command of the lower rank, nevertheless remain at all times in control, in such areas as attitude, discipline, and presentation, leaving artistic control, and interpretation firmly in the hands of the leading musician.

== Formation of the Corps of Army Music (1994) ==
On 13 August 1994 the Queen signed a warrant to allow the formation of the Corps of Army Music. It was her will and pleasure that all officers who were directors of music in the various corps and regiments, and all army musicians should transfer to the Corps of Army Music. The transfer took place on 1 September 1994. From that time, all bands were accorded a director of music, and a bandmaster. The latter's role being concomitant with that of Training Officer. The 'Private' rank of 'Bandsman' was abolished, in favour of 'Musician' of the former staff bands. Individual bands continue to wear the uniforms and cap badges of the regiments and corps which they support, but their personnel all belong to the same corps.

The Royal Artillery Band does not take a direct role in the Trooping the Colour parade. The Trooping the Colour as seen on Horse Guards Parade is a ceremony, which involves the whole of the Household Division, the Household Cavalry, and nowadays, also the King's Troop (as head of Her Majesty's Household Troops). While other regiments and corps hold similar trooping-the-colour ceremonies, that of the Guards is held annually to celebrate the official birthday of Her Majesty the Queen. The Royal Artillery Band is nevertheless always very much in evidence on the day of the Trooping the Colour, by taking part in the Royal Birthday gun salute given by the King's Troop in Hyde Park.

The total number of bands remaining after 'Options for Change' was 29. By 2013, there were 23.

=== State bands ===
The Royal Artillery Band is the oldest band in the British Army, but was the last regular army band to be accorded 'state band' status, a status which it lost on 9 February 2014 when both the Royal Regiment and its band vacated Woolwich Barracks. However, the Band had held the status of a state band twice before, during the reigns of King George II/King George III, and Queen Victoria. Notwithstanding, the Royal Artillery Band was often in demand for important state and public duties, and to represent the nation. It was the favourite band of King George IV, the Duchess of Kent (Queen Victoria's mother), Queen Victoria, and Sir Winston Churchill. The number of Regular Army State Bands, was further reduced on 1 September 2014, when The Band of the Life Guards and The Band of The Blues and Royals were joined to form The Band of The Household Cavalry. At the same time the Army Reserve (United Kingdom) Bands of the Honourable Artillery Company and the Royal Yeomanry were both granted State Band status.

=== Satellite and Depot Bands ===
In addition to the Royal Artillery Band, the regiment maintained a number of official 'satellite' professional bands, and 'depot' professional bands, to support Royal Artillery units elsewhere. These were, SATELLITE: Royal Horse Artillery Band (1993 - 1877); Royal Artillery Brass Band (1869 - 1893); Royal Artillery Mounted Band* (1886 - 1985); Royal Artillery Portsmouth Band** (1903 - 1953); Royal Artillery BAOR Band** (1953 - 1993); Royal Artillery Larkhill Band** (1967 - 1971); Royal Artillery Plymouth Band (1903 - 1921); Royal Artillery Salisbury Plain Band** (1921 - 1946); Royal Artillery Plymouth Band (1947 - 1952); Royal Artillery Northern Command Band (1952 - 1953); Royal Artillery Plymouth Band (1953 - 1961); Royal Artillery Gibraltar Band (1899 - 1928); Royal Artillery Alanbrooke Band** (1972 - 1993); Royal Artillery Malta Band (1885 - 1970), DEPOT: Royal Artillery Warley Band (dates unknown); Royal Artillery Sheerness Band (dates unknown); Royal Artillery Dover Band (dates unknown); Royal Artillery Canterbury Band (dates unknown).

- The Royal Artillery Mounted Band was founded at Woolwich, but moved location to Aldershot, while a 'Mounted Portion' was retained at Woolwich. It later moved to Larkhill in Wiltshire, then to Dortmund in Germany, before returning to Larkhill until its disbandment.
  - The bands marked above with two asterisks are the same continuing band, but which changed name according to its location and situation.

== Regimental music ==
=== British Grenadiers March ===
The tune 'The British Grenadiers' was first adopted for use as a regimental march by the Honourable Artillery Company (the oldest British regiment), during the English Civil War. Although grenades were first launched by artillerymen in 1643, the term 'grenade' was only first documented in 1688. Originally a Dutch song, the melody now known as 'The British Grenadiers' in its more recognizable form known today, was brought to England by King William I of the Netherlands. However, a version of it, titled 'The New Bath' had previously appeared in a '17th Century Dance Book' by Playford. In the Netherlands, it is known as 'De jonge prins van Friesland' ('The Young Friesian Prince') after Prince Johann Willem Friso. In 1716, the march became the regimental quick march of the Royal Artillery, and was known as the 'Royal Artillery Grenadiers March', but was not declared 'official' until 1882. It first appeared in print, as 'The British Grenadiers' in 1740. An example of an eighteenth century fife and drums infantry band may be seen in the film 'Barry Lyndon'(1975):

During the War of Spanish Succession (1702-1713) a text was added, which remains to this day in publications of the tune as a British folk song.

The 'British Grenadiers' later became the regimental march of both the Grenadier Guards, and the Royal Fusiliers (the Grenadier Guards were formed after the Battle of Waterloo in 1815). Notwithstanding the formation of the Royal Fusiliers (City of London Regiment) in 1685, the Grenade (a small incendiary device originating during the Eastern Roman 'Byzantine' Empire) is a weapon of artillery, and as such was always manufactured and kept in the royal arsenals of King Henry VIII at the Tower of London, and at Chatham, and Woolwich - both in the county of Kent, until the Fusilier regiments, and later the Foot Guards, each adopted them as standard weaponry. Therefore, the original grenadiers, were in fact artillerymen.

As a regimental quick march, the short duration of the melody has always resulted in unwanted repetition, but in 1983, Lieutenant-Colonel Stanley Patch (then Director of Music) provided a suitable solution, by adding the Trio section of another favourite artillery march, 'The Voice of The Guns', composed by Major F.J. Ricketts under the pseudonym 'Kenneth J. Alford'. The Royal Regiment's modern-day official quick march, arranged by Lt. Col. S.J. Patch, RA, with its Kenneth Alford 'The Voice Of The Guns' extension, may be heard here, played by the Band of The Royal Canadian Artillery: The popularity of the tune 'The British Grenadiers' during the Napoleonic Wars rivalled that of its contemporary 'Lilliburlero', and subsequently led to its adoption by all regiments who wear as their cap or collar badges, the symbol of the grenade.

=== The Trayne of Artillery's Grenadiers March ===
Prior to the Royal Artillery adopting 'The British Grenadiers' in 1716 as its regimental quick march, 'The Train of Artillery' (as it is now known) was the rather elegant (medium-) original quick march of the royal regiment. The march later appeared in print for the first time, published by Thompson & Son, London, in 'The Compleat Tutor for the Fife', circa 1760. The first grenadiers, or grenade-throwers were artillery soldiers.

The original military march is scored for eight players, comprising 2 piccolos (in two-part counterpoint), 2 oboes, 2 bassoons, and 2 drums. At the time, the two piccolos were played by the two clarinetists of the band, who alternated between clarinet and piccolo as required. Two updated recordings exist by the Royal Artillery - one conducted by its director of music Major Robert Quinn (in 18th-century style, albeit for full modern military band), and a contemporary version, arranged and conducted by Lt Colonel Malcom Torrent.

=== The Minden Rose ===
The origins of this march are obscure. The piece was first documented as 'Mindener-Marsch', and possibly came into being during the battle of Minden. In style, it is a ceremonial 'Reiter-Marsch', or cavalry march, and probably adapted to accompany the horse-drawn guns of the Artillery, from a German regional folk song.

=== The Marquess of Granby's March ===
The Marquess of Granby (the Earl of Rutland) was Master-General of the Regiment (1763–1772), and was preceded by General Ligonier (1759–1763) after whom, a now forgotten slow march 'General Ligonier's March' was named. The appointment 'Master-General' is nowadays known as 'Master Gunner, St. James's Park' (not to be confused with 'Master Gunner', which is a Warrant Officer special skills appointment).

=== The Royal Artillery Slow March ===
The Royal Artillery Slow March was composed by Princess Louisa Victoria, Duchess of Kent, and mother of Queen Victoria (herself "a most competent musician"), circa 1836, and first used in 1843. It is also the regimental walk march of the Royal Horse Artillery, and is also used (but in a different version) by the Corps of Royal Electrical and Mechanical Engineers. Until 1843, when the first 'regimental marches' were officially chosen (at the suggestion of George Mackenzie, Master of the Royal Artillery Band), regiments became accustomed to those marches that were played regularly for representation and recognition purposes, which had usually been composed by the current masters of their bands. With each change of master, marches lapsed into disuse, to be replaced by newer ones. The Regimental Slow March, 'The Duchess Of Kent Slow March':

=== Regimental Trot 'The Keel Row' ===
The Royal Horse Artillery (and cavalry regiments) adopted this Tyneside air in 1903 on its publication by the War Office. This march is one example of the Regiment's intention to cater for all of its troops, drawn, as they were, from all regions of the United Kingdom. By comparison, almost all other regiments have traditionally recruited locally (e.g. the Devon & Dorset Regiment, the Durham Light Infantry, the Royal Hampshire Regiment, the Green Howards, etc.).

=== Regimental Canter 'Bonnie Dundee' ===
The melody of 'Bonnie Dundee' dates back to the battle of Bannockburn in 1314. By 1600 the melody was certainly known all over Scotland and England. It appears in 'The Beggar's Opera' and was used by Robert Burns. It is also associated with a poem by Sir Walter Scott, which commemorates the Viscount of Dundee's bravery in the 1689 rebellion. It is believed that the title of this melody refers to the Viscount of Dundee, rather than to the jute-, and marmalade-producing city of the same name.

=== Fanfare 'The Royal Regiment' ===
The composer Frederic Curzon (1899, London – 1973, Bournemouth) was at one time, a Gunner officer. Curzon wrote this fanfare for the opening of the Royal Artillery Association Rally in 1952. Its masterful use of both the RA's and RHA's 'Trumpet Call' typify the composer's penchant for incorporating melodies that he associated with his personal experiences in life.

Of his many lasting compositions, perhaps the most perennial are the suites "Robin Hood", "In Malaga", "Dance of an Ostracized Imp", "Galavant", and "The Boulevardier", all of which continue to be performed, and recorded by orchestras worldwide. Frederic Curzon frequently performed as an unofficial band member at the Royal Artillery Officers Mess in Woolwich, playing violin, cello, piano, and organ. He was an honorary member of the Royal Artillery Band.

Other notable composers who wrote specially for the Royal Artillery Band include Zavertal, Dvořák, C P E Bach, and Sir Arthur Bliss, Master of the Queen's Music.

Fanfare, 'The Royal Regiment':

=== The 'Eton Boating Song' ===
The 'Eton Boating Song' was composed in 1863 by one Captain Algernon Drummond, and transcribed by T. L. Mitchell, and the piano accompaniment was arranged by Evelyn Wodehouse. The words of Kipling's 'Screw Guns' from his 'Barrack Room Ballads' are well known to RA officers and soldiers. Screw guns were so-named, because the barrels could be broken down into pieces, to be carried on mules in mountainous regions. They were last used during the Second World War, by RA Mountain Regiments in the campaign in Italy. The piece was arranged for orchestra, with a transcribed edition for military band, by Karl Kaps, as an 'English' (='slow', with 3 definite beats to the bar) waltz, and published by B. Feldman & Co. London. The Eton Boating Song set to Kipling's 'Screw Guns', as the Regimental Song:

== First performances and cinema ==
- HÄNDEL: 'Music for the Royal Fireworks'* (orchestra comprising musicians from the Royal Artillery, and from the Royal Band) (World Premiere)
- HÄNDEL: 'Water Music'* (orchestra comprising musicians from the Royal Artillery, and from the Royal Band) (World Premiere)
- DVOŘÁK: Symphony No. 2 (British premiere to a private, invited audience at Woolwich, London)
- DVOŘÁK: 'A Symphony From The New World' (British premiere to a private, invited audience at Woolwich, London)
- WAGNER: Overture, and orchestral music from 'Die Meistersinger von Nürnberg' (British Premiere)
- SMETANA: Overture to 'Prodana Nevesta' ('The Bartered Bride') (British Premiere)

*Royal Band of King George II/strings and kettledrums of the Artillery Band

CINEMA

This list includes the most recent appearances by the Royal Artillery Band in films (movies), and films in which recordings by the Royal Artillery Band have been included on the soundtracks. Please note, that the Band did not necessarily appear as "The Royal Artillery Band" or in their own regimental uniforms.

"Carrington V.C." (1954 Dir. Anthony Asquith) - Royal Artillery trumpeter (trumpet calls in barracks and mess call in Officers' Mess on location at Woolwich)

"Elgar" (1962, dir. Ken Russell) (Funeral procession of Queen Victoria, with the Royal Artillery Mounted Band) - brief newsreel footage

"Lawrence of Arabia" (1962 dir. David Lean) - the Royal Artillery Band was not available at the time of filming. Instead, a mock military band in desert barrack dress was created, with the march "The Voice of the Guns" by Kenneth J. Alford dubbed onto the soundtrack, performed by musicians of the Philharmonia Orchestra, in a special arrangement by the composer of the film score, Maurice Jarre

"Crossplot" (1969 dir. Robert S. Baker), starring Roger Moore and Claudie Lange - as the Royal Artillery Band (Hyde Park death scene, with the King's Troop Royal Horse Artillery)

"The Music Lovers" (1971 dir. Ken Russell), Starring Glenda Jackson and Richard Chamberlain - as Russian Cossack performers

"Chaplin" (1992, dir. Richard Attenborough) - as the Royal Artillery Band (Kings Cross Station platform scene)

"Amelie" (2009, dir. Mira Nair) - credits: "Hands Across The Sea" by the Royal Artillery Band

"A Heartbeat Away" (2011, dir. Gale Edwards) - credits: "Excel Fanfare Scherzo & Theme" by the Royal Artillery Band

"Mute" (2018, dir. Duncan Jones) - credits: "The Thunderer" by the Royal Artillery Band

"Downton Abbey - the Movie" (2019, dir. Julian Fellowes) during the arrival of the King & Queen and parade - representing the "Yorkshire Yeomanry Regiment", together with the King's Troop Royal Horse Artillery - "On Ilkla Moor Bah't 'At" & Fučik: "March - 'Florentiner'" - credits: The Royal Artillery Band

== See also ==
- Royal Artillery Mounted Band

== Sources ==
- The Rotunda Museum, Royal Artillery Barracks, Woolwich, London
- The Royal Artillery Band to appear at Inter Services T20, 2012
- The British Military Tournament 2011 Musical Highlights
- Classics Online / ROYAL ARTILLERY BAND: Queen's Birthday Salute
- Corps of Army Music

=== Bibliography ===
- Farmer, H.G. Memoirs of the Royal Artillery Band. London, UK: Boosey & Co., 1904.
- Farmer, H.G. Military Music. Max Parrish & Co Limited., 1950.
- Farmer, H.G. Cavaliere Zaverthal and the Royal Artillery Band. Hinrichsen Edition Limited, 1951. ASIN B0007IUBWM.
- Farmer, H.G. History of the Royal Artillery Band. London S.E 18, UK: Royal Artillery Institution, 1954. ASIN:B000J2ZMY8
- Turner, G. The History of British Military Bands v2. Spellmount Publishers Ltd, 1996. ISBN 978-1873376089.
- Turner, G. The Trumpets Will Sound. Parapress, 1996. ISBN 978-1898594383.
- Cassin-Scott, J, Fabb J. Military Bands and their Uniforms. Poole, Dorset, UK: Blandford Press, 1978. ISBN 978-0713708950.
- Fox, L.M. Instruments of Processional Music. London, UK: Lutterworth Press, 1967. ISBN 978-0718804497.
- Slonimsky, N. Lectionary of Music. Anchor Books, 1990. ISBN 978-0385414210.
- "The Grove Dictionary of Music"
- "The New Grove Dictionary of Music"
- "The Oxford Companion to Music", edited by Percy Scholes
- "The New Oxford Companion to Music", Edited by Denis Arnold
- "The Grove Concise Dictionary of Music", Edited by Stanley Sadie
- Sleeve notes from various Long Playing Records, Extended-Play Records, and Compact Disc booklet notes
