= Band of the Scots Guards =

One of the five bands in the British Foot Guards

Scots Guards Band
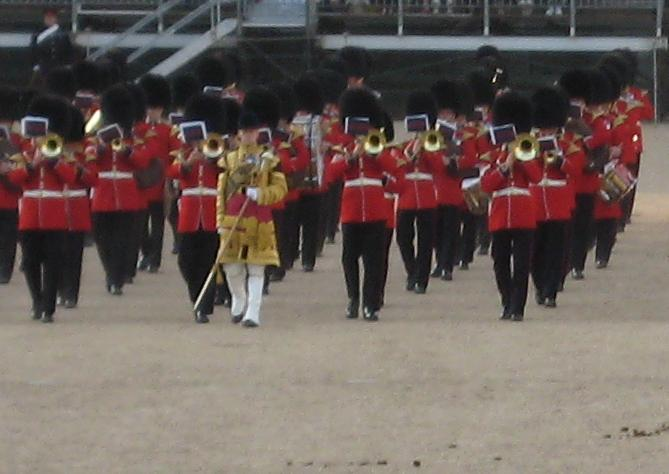
- The Band of the Scots Guards beating retreat at Horseguards in London in 2008

Background information
- Also known as: Band of the Scots Guards
- Origin: Scotland, United Kingdom
- Website: Home of the Scots Guards Band

The Band of the Scots Guards is one of five bands in the Foot Guards Regiments in the Household Division which primarily guards the British monarch.

The band is based at Wellington Barracks in St James's, London, which is the same place as for all the foot guards bands. The band should not be confused with the Pipes and Drums, which is a separate entity comprising fighting soldiers who are also pipers, rather than full-time professional musicians.

== History ==
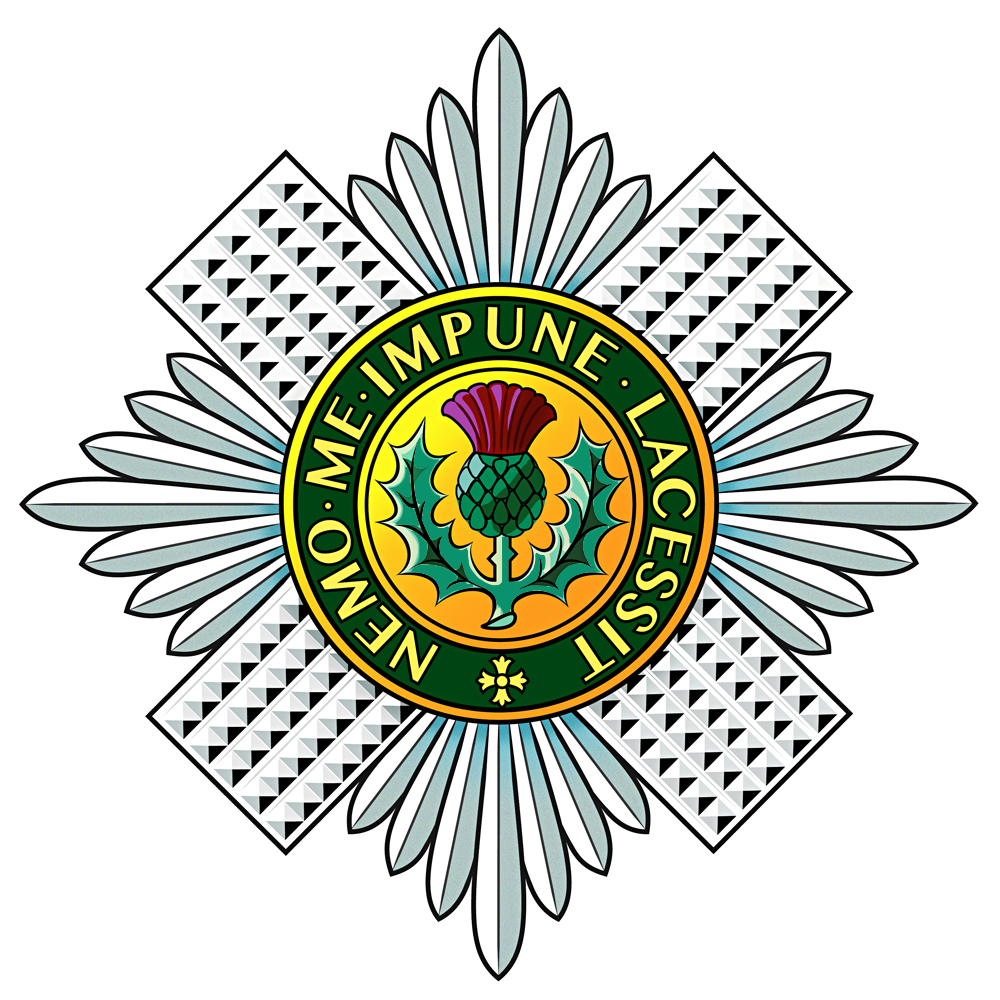
Regimental badge of the Scots Guards

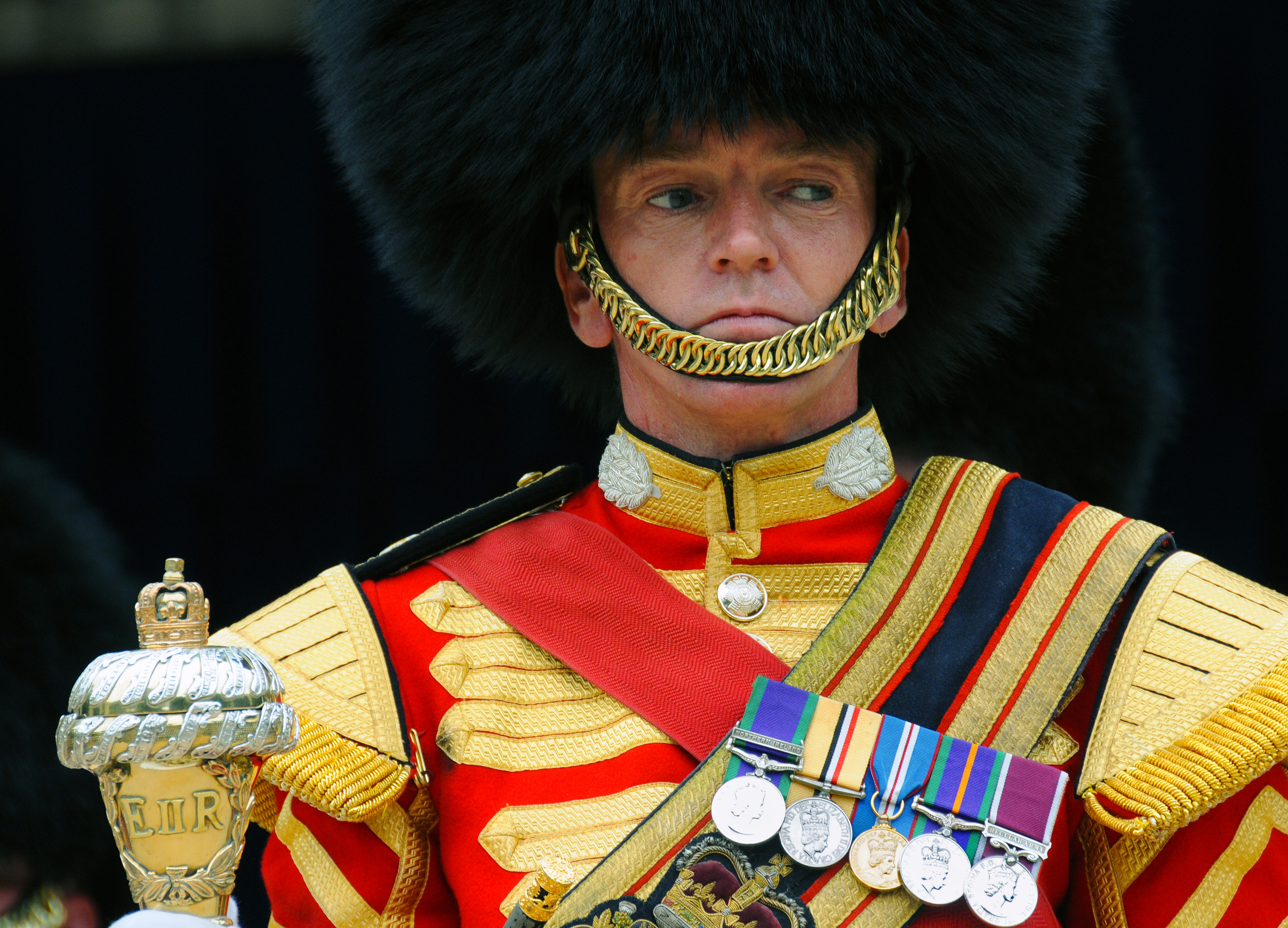
Drum major Sgt. Martin Godsman in 2009.

The Scots Guards is a regiment that was formed by King Charles I in 1642. It is known that in 1716 a small band of "hautbouys" existed; however, the precise origins of the Band of the Scots Guards are unknown.

The band grew in strength during the early part of the 19th century and by 1838, it could boast some 32 performers. Throughout the 19th century the band expanded, until in 1888, there was an establishment of 44.

During the First World War it entertained troops at Ypres and the Somme in 1916. During the Second World War it was entertaining troops on the home front. This was sometimes through the medium of wireless, an example being 18 March 1942, when at 1 am, band members reported for a BBC Overseas Broadcast at the Paris Cinema. Musicians also found themselves on Fire Watch duties based at Egerton House, Buckingham Gate.

The Scots Guards was the only Foot Guards Band to be deployed on active service during the Gulf War in 1990 (with three of their colleagues from the Irish Guards Band). Many different aspects of hospital duties attached to the various departments of 33 General Hospital based in Al Jubail, Saudi Arabia were involved in their work there. In 1992, the Colonel of the Regiment, The Duke of Kent presented Gulf War Medals to Band members.

== Regimental Marches ==
The Regimental Quick March is Hielan' Laddie. The Regimental Slow March is The Garb of Old Gaul.

== Ensembles ==
There are several ensembles within the Band of the Scots Guards:

- Concert band
- Marching band
- Dance band
- Fanfare Trumpeters
- Brass Quintet
- Wind Quintet
- String Quartet
- Orchestra
- Jazz Ensemble

== Functions ==
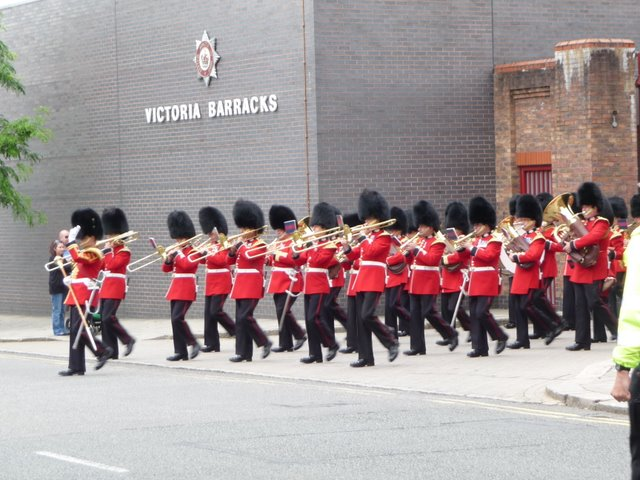
The band outside Victoria Barracks, Windsor.

The Band of the Scots Guards plays for events of state as part of the Massed Bands of the Household Division. Some of the occasions that are most famous are listed below, although this is not a comprehensive list:

- Changing of the Guard
- The Festival of Remembrance
- Trooping the Colour
- Beating the Retreat
- Royal Ascot

The band also performs at other non-military events.

== See also ==
- Coldstream Guards Band
- Grenadier Guards Band
- Irish Guards Band
- Welsh Guards Band
- Household Division
