= Duchess of Edinburgh's String Orchestra =

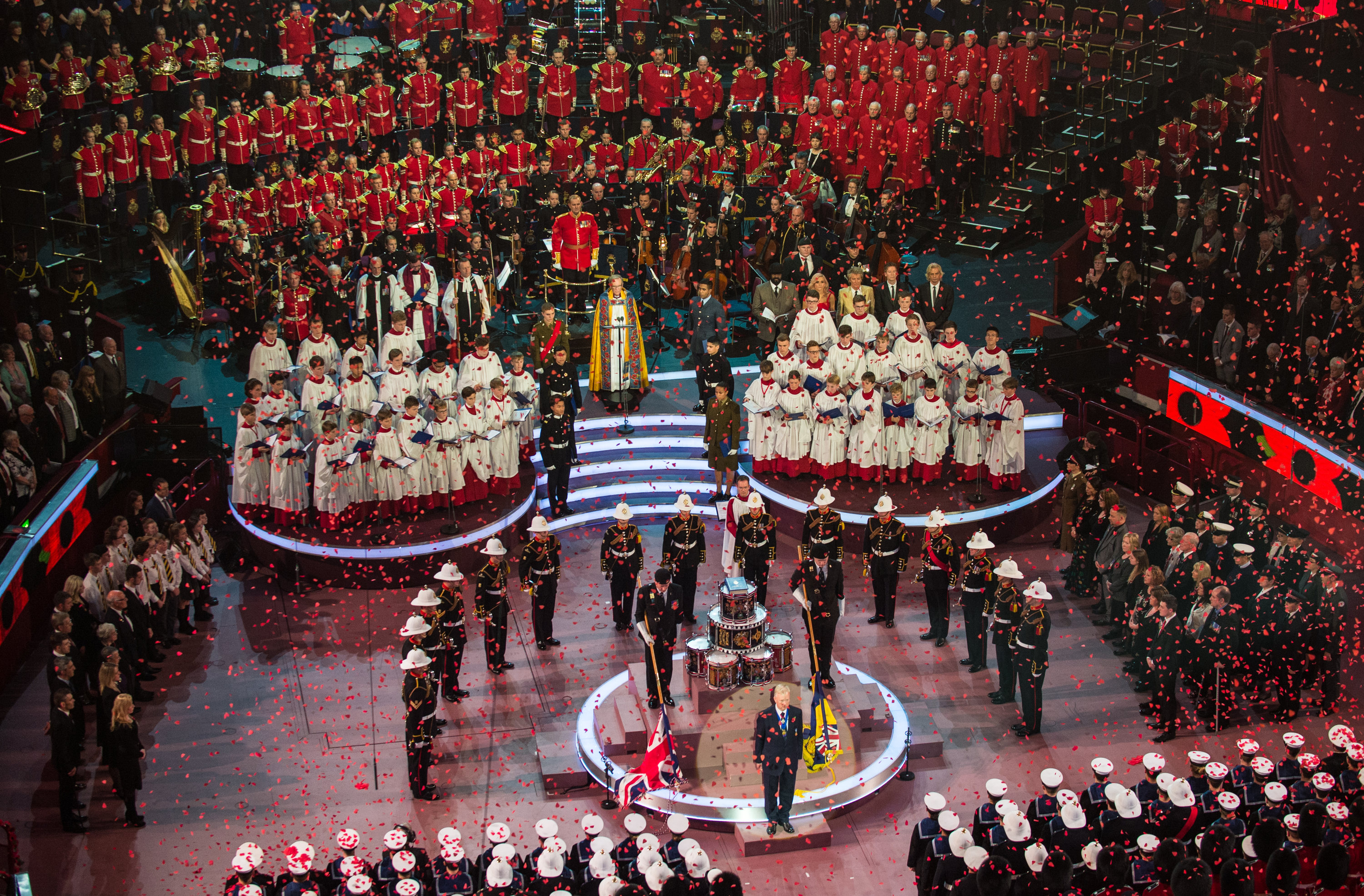
The orchestra (in the center) performing during the Festival of Remembrance on Remembrance Day.

The Duchess of Edinburgh's String Orchestra (DESO), previously known as the Countess of Wessex's String Orchestra (CWSO), is a 24-member string band from the British Army's Royal Corps of Army Music. It is the only independent full-time string band in the British Armed Forces. It is named after Sophie, Duchess of Edinburgh (formerly Countess of Wessex), the daughter-in-law of Queen Elizabeth II, sister-in-law of King Charles III and Colonel-in-Chief of RCAM. It is stationed from the former quarters of the Royal Artillery at Woolwich Barracks.

== History ==
There have been string bands in existence in the British Army since the mid-18th century, usually being sported by units of the Royal Artillery. In 1994, the Royal Artillery Band and Orchestra were absorbed in the newly formed Corps of Army Music. It was announced on 30 July 2013 that the Royal Artillery Orchestra would cease to exist in favour of a forthcoming "State String Orchestra", following cuts to Army Music. On 3 March 2014, Queen Elizabeth approved the title of the "Countess of Wessex's String Orchestra" for the new military band in honour of the CAMUS Colonel-in-Chief. It was officially created on 1 April 2014. Earlier that February, the Royal Artillery Band, formed a special "Veterans of the Royal Artillery Band" that paraded on General Gordon's Square for the last time in Woolwich. The Countess of Wessex first visited the orchestra in early December. The visit saw the orchestra perform a piece composed by members of the orchestra in her honor.

== Duties ==
It has been invited to perform at events such as investitures, ceremonies at Royal Households, state banquets and dinners. Its task is unique to the group as it is the first dedicated military ensemble designed for non-traditional instruments. It has performed in a combined setting with its counterparts from the Royal Air Force and Royal Marines: the RAF Music Salon Orchestra and the String Orchestra from the Band of HM Royal Marines Portsmouth.

== See also ==
- British military bands
- Central Band of the Canadian Armed Forces
- Seventh Army Symphony Orchestra
- United States Army Band
- Alexandrov Ensemble
- Six-String Soldiers
