= Henry George Farmer =

British musicologist and orientalist (1882–1965)

Henry George Farmer (17 January 1882 – 30 December 1965) was a British musicologist, orientalist and conductor. Grove Music Online remarks that "Farmer was noted primarily for his contributions to the field of Arabic music, he also wrote important works on the history of Scottish and military music". Farmer wrote extensively about Arab musical influences on the European musical tradition and the Islamic legacy to music theory. He typically published under H.G. Farmer.

== Life and career ==
Henry George Farmer was born in Birr Barracks, a mile from in Birr, Kings County (now CountyOffaly ), Ireland on 17 January 1882. His father, also Henry George Farmer (1848–1900), was stationed with the Prince of Wales's Leinster Regiment of the British Army. His mother, Mary Ann Harling (1850–1907), was related to Afflecks and Allans of Scotland. An earlier Henry Farmer (1819–1891) had composed popular liturgy – Mass in B-flat and concertos. His nephew was John Farmer (1835–1901), also a music teacher, organist and composer.

Farmer grew up in a disciplinarian family and part of an Anglo-Irish community in the Irish Midlands. By age seven he began studying piano, choral singing and harmony. The organist and choirmaster Vincent Sykes (b. 1851) tutored him. The Farmers were originally from Berkshire and had several musical connections. In 1888 Henry George visited relatives in Nottingham who owned a music warehouse. He studied under Thomas Hunter Weir, Professor of Oriental Languages at University of Glasgow.

Farmer represented Britain at the 1932 Cairo Congress of Arab Music and wrote on a wide range of topics from Turkish, Scottish and Irish musical traditions, including British military music. He contributed generously to Grove's Dictionary of Music (fifth edition).

Farmer died in Law, South Lanarkshire, Scotland, aged 83 on 30 December 1965.

A collection of Farmer's papers is housed at the Special Collections Department of the Glasgow University Library at the University of Glasgow.

== Writings ==
=== Books ===
- The Rise & Development of Military Music. London: W. Reeves (1912).
- The Arabic Musical Manuscripts in the Bodleian Library: A Descriptive Catalogue With Illustrations of Musical Instruments. London: W. Reeves. (1925)
- The Arabian Influence on Musical Theory. London: H. Reeves.(1925).
- Byzantine Musical Instruments in the Ninth Century. London: Harold Reeves (1925).
- A History of Arabian Music to the XIIIth Century. London: Luzac & Co (1929).
- Historical Facts for the Arabian Musical Influence. Ayer Publishing (1930) ISBN 0-405-08496-X.
- The Organ of the Ancients, From Eastern Sources (Hebrew, Syriac and Arabic). London: W. Reeves (1931).
- Studies in Oriental Musical Instruments. Glasgow: The Civic Press (1939).
- The Sources of Arabian Music: An Annotated Bibliography of Arabic Manuscripts Which Deal With the Theory, Practice, and History of Arabian Music. Bearsden, Scotland (issued privately by author) (1940).
- Sa'adyah Gaon on the Influence of Music. London: A. Probsthain (1943).
- Concerts in 18th Century Scotland. J.C. Erskine (1945).
- The Glen Collection of Musical Instruments. Glasgow (1945).
- The Minstrelsy of The Arabian Nights: A Study of Music and Musicians in the Arabic Alf laila wa laila. Bearsden, Scotland (issued privately) (1945).
- A History of Music in Scotland. Hinrichsen Ed. (1947). ISBN 0-306-71865-0.
- Music Making in the Olden Days: The Story of the Aberdeen Concerts, 1748–1801. New York: Peters-Hinrichsen Ed. (1950).
- Cavaliere Zavertal and the Royal Artillery Band. London: Hinrichsen Ed., lcd., Museum House (1951).
- Oriental Studies, Mainly Musical. London, New York: Hinrichsen Ed. (1953).
- History of the Royal Artillery Band, 1762–1953. London: Royal Artillery Institution (1954)
- The Song Captions in the Kitab al-aghani al-kabir. London: H. Baron (1955).
- Bernard Shaw's Sister and Her Friends: A New Angle on G.B.S. Leiden: E. J. Brill (1959).
- Handel's Kettledrums, and Other Papers on Military Music. London: Hinrichsen (1965).
- The Science of Music in the Mafatih Al-Ulum. Reprinted from the Transactions of the Glasgow University Oriental Society, v. 17. (1959).
- Al-Farabi's Arabic-Latin Writings on Music in the Ihsa al-'ulum. New York: Hinrichsen Ed. (1965).
- British Bands in Battle. New York, London: Hinrichsen (1965).

=== Articles & Misc. Publications ===
- The Influence of Music: From Arabic Sources Proceedings of the Musical Association, 52nd Session, pp. 89–124 (1925).
- Clues for the Arabian Influence on European Musical Theory Journal of the Royal Asiatic Society JRAS; Vol.57, 1, Jan 1925, pp. 61–80
- Turkoman Music (letter to editor). The Musical Times, v.69, no.1027 (Sept 1928), p. 833 (1928).
- "Music in Mediæval Scotland". Proceedings of the Musical Association, 56th Session, pp. 69–90 (1929).
- Greek Theorists of Music in Arabic Translation. Isis, v.13, no.2 (Feb 1930), pp. 325–333 (1930).
- Orchestral Drum-Names (letter to editor). The Musical Times, v.71, no.1050 (Aug 1930), p. 740 (1930).
- A Sample of Musical Biography (letter to editor). The Musical Times, v.72, no.1063 (Sept 1931), p. 833 (1931).
- British Musicians a Century Ago. Music & Letters, v.12, no.4 (Oct 1931), pp. 384–392 (1931).
- A Forgotten Composer of Anthems: William Savage (1720–89). Music & Letters, v.17, no.3 (July 1936), pp. 188–199 (1936).
- Unknown Birthdays of Some Georgian Musicians. Music & Letters, v.20, no.3 (Jul 1939), pp. 299–303. doi:10.1093/ml/XX.3.299
- Some Notes on the Irish Harp. Music & Letters, v.24, no.2 (Apr 1943), pp. 100–107.
- Music of the Arabian Nights. Journal of the Royal Asiatic Society Vol.76, 3–4, Oct 1944, pp. 172–185
- An Historic March. Music & Letters, v. 26, no. 3 (Jul 1945), pp. 172–177 (1945).
- Ghosts': An Excursus on Arabic Musical Bibliographies. Isis, v.36, no.2, pp. 123–130 (Jan 1946).
- Crusading Martial Music. Music & Letters, v.30, no.3, pp. 243–249. (Jul 1949)
- Music Down Below. The Musical Times, v.90, no.1279, pp. 307–309. (Sept 1949)
- Henry George Farmer. Birr man recalls sixty years of a town's musical traditions. Midland Tribune, (17 June 1961).
- Monster Kettledrums. Music & Letters, v.43, no.2 (Apr 1962), pp. 129–130 (1962). doi:10.1093/ml/43.2.129
- ʿAbdalqādir ibn Ġaibī on Instruments of Music. Oriens, v.15, pp. 242–248. (Dec 1962).
- Farmer, H. G. (2001). "Dance, William". Grove Music Online. Oxford: Oxford University Press. doi:10.1093/gmo/9781561592630.article.07152. (subscription, Wikilibrary access, or UK public library membership required)
