= Qatar Armed Forces Band Regiment =

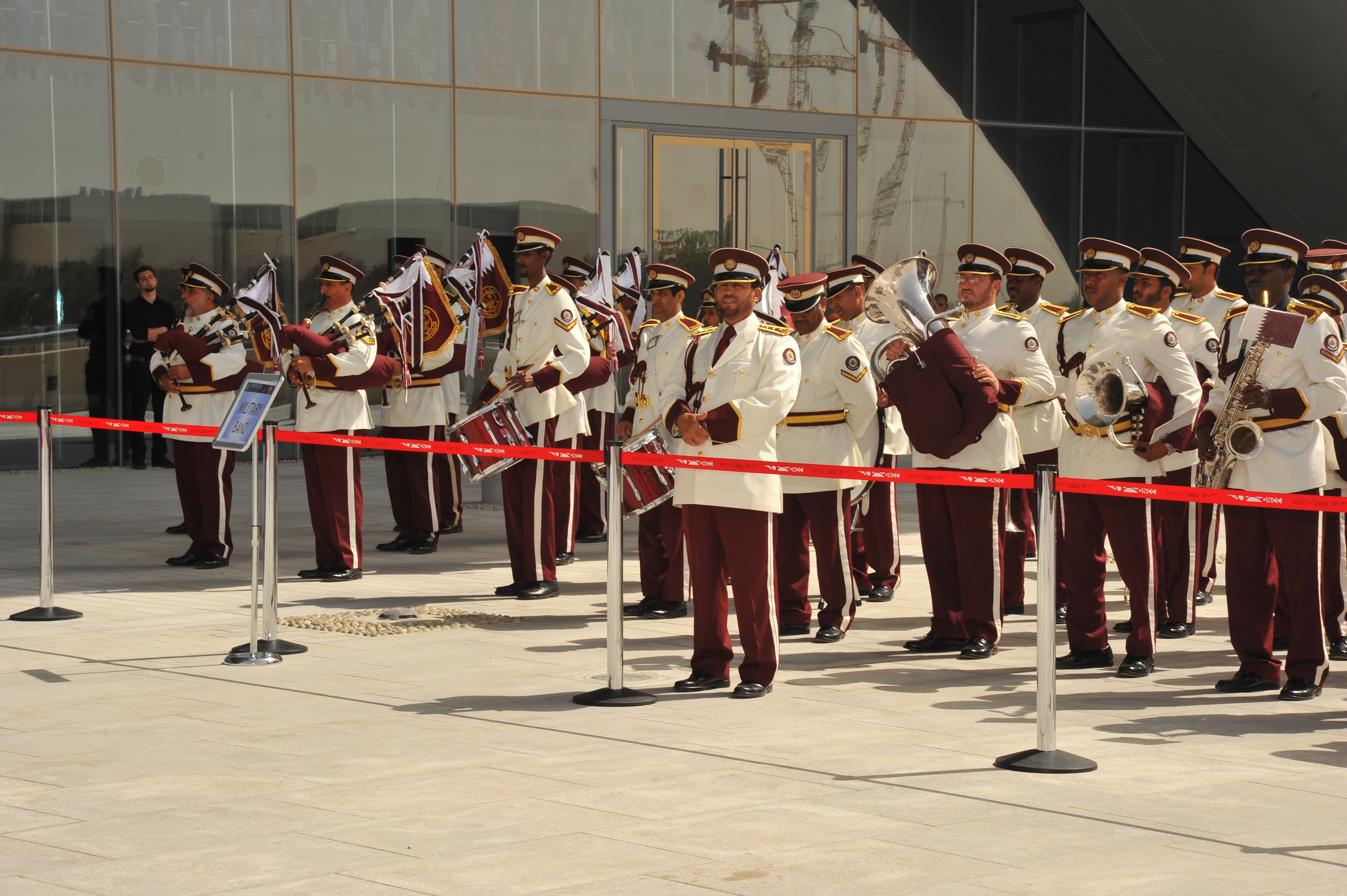
The band at a flag-raising ceremony in April 2012.

The Qatar Armed Forces Band Regiment (Arabic: فرقة القوات المسلحة القطرية) is a musical unit from the State of Qatar usually performing at military functions or events.

== History ==
The band formed in 1949, when a percussion unit was used for military ceremonies. In 1954, a rhythm band was formed followed in 1958 by a music band. It has performed at the Qatar National Library, Qatar National Convention Centre, Al Janoub Stadium, and the Doha Corniche. The band plays at the Amiri Diwan during all celebrations as well as on all occasions sponsored by the government such as the National Day Parade. It has visited countries such as France and the United Kingdom. In its travels, it has cooperated with military bands such as the United States Air Forces Central Command Band and the Band of the Irish Guards. Like many military bands in the Middle East, it maintains a pipe band. In 1969, a commemorative stamp was issued in its honor.

== Full dress uniform ==
The full dress uniform of the band is based on Islamic dress for males. It is similar to that of the Amiri Guard. The head dress is a keffiyeh and the tunic is a thawb, while a sirwal is typically worn underneath. On regular parades, the band wears a white tunic accompanied by maroon trousers and a maroon headcap.

== See also ==
- Indian military bands
- United Arab Emirates Armed Forces Band
- Jordanian Armed Forces Band
- Bahrain Defence Forces Music Band
