= Bahrain Philharmonic Orchestra =

- Orchestra
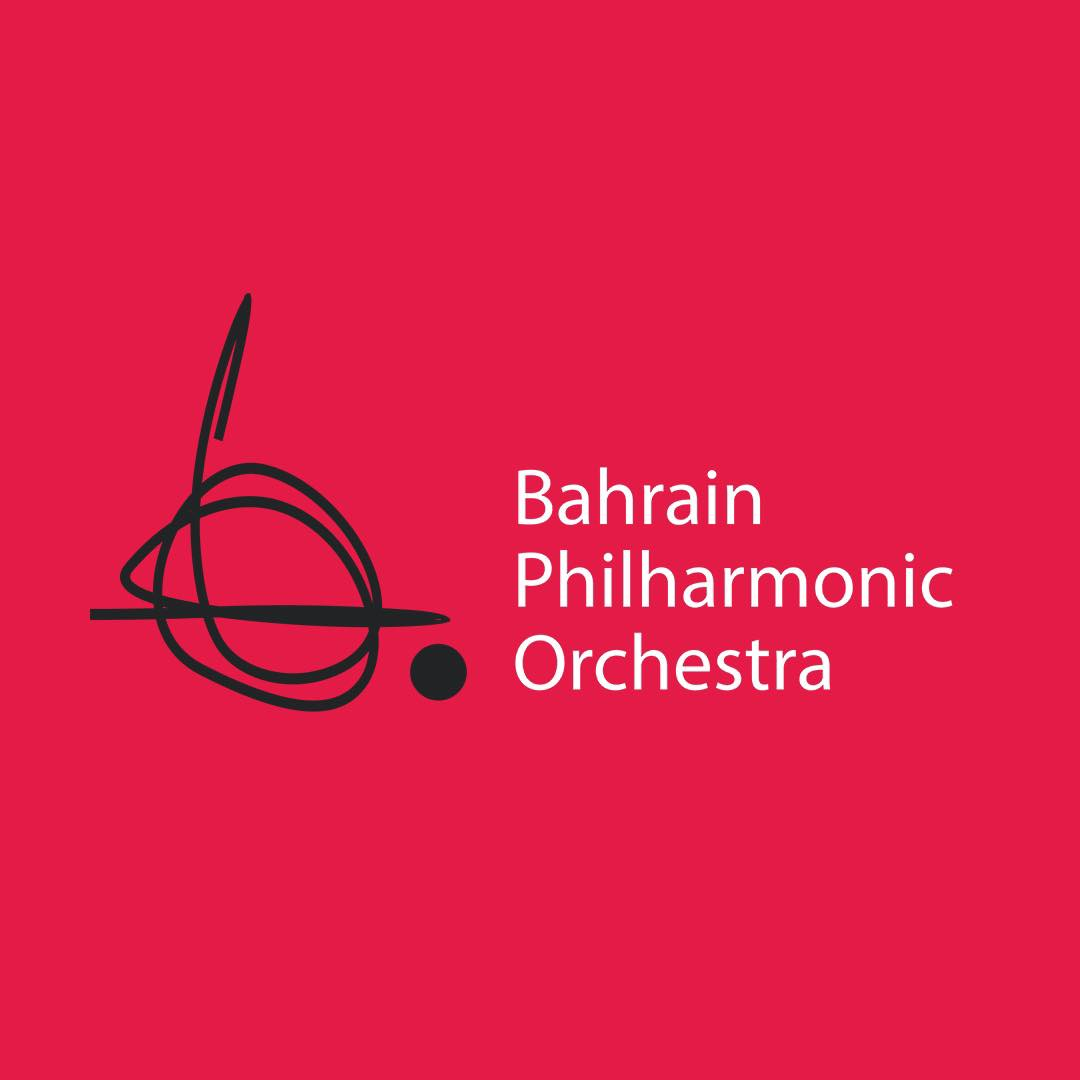
- Native name: أوركسترا البحرين الفيلهارمونية
- Founded: March 2022
- Location: Bahrain

The Bahrain Philharmonic Orchestra is a Bahraini orchestra established in 2022 by Mubarak Najem and supported by the Bahrain Authority for Culture and Antiquities. Aiming to "shape" cultural identity and present the Kingdom of Bahrain as a "prominent destination that attracts all forms of cultural creativity", the orchestra has performed a number of times since 2022 at the National Theatre of Bahrain and taken part in the Bahrain International Music Festival.

== See also ==
- Bahrain Defence Forces Music Band
