= Music of Qatar =

The music of Qatar is based on sea folk poetry, song and dance. The historical importance of pearl fishing is commonly expressed through melodies, tunes, and dances. Traditional dances in Doha are performed on Friday afternoons; one such dance is the Ardah, a stylized martial dance performed by two rows of dancers who are accompanied by an array of percussion instruments, including al-ras (a large drum whose leather is heated by an open fire), mirwas and cymbals with small drums. Other folk instruments include the oud and rebaba, both string instruments, as well as the ney and sirttai, which are types of flutes.

Music served multiple cultural purposes in the past, ranging from being used in weddings and other celebrations to religious rituals, as lullabies (hadhada), and in military parades. Workers would also sing amidst the toil of their daily tasks, mainly during sea-based activities. In contemporary times, khaliji ('gulf') music has gained in popularity among the locals. As immigration to Qatar rapidly increased throughout the 21st century, foreigners have come to dominate the country, resulting in the widespread appearance of musical genres such as Bollywood music, western pop music and Egyptian music.

== History ==
The country's first musical troupe was created in Doha in 1966 by Abdulaziz Nasser Al Obaidan under the name Al Adwaa. One of the band's founding members was Ibrahim Ali, who is considered a pioneer in Qatari music and who specialized in playing the oud. In 1968, Qatar Radio introduced a music segment in its programming, mainly due to the efforts of Al Obaidan.

In 1991, it was noted in Al-ughniya al-sha biyya f Qatar that there were at least 26 folk music bands, including several female ones. Many of the band members had full-time employment outside of music. Band expenses were paid for by royalties for appearing on Qatar Television and radio stations, as well as performing at events such as weddings. Among the most well-known artists of this era are Saeed bin Salem Al-Badie Al-Mannai, Rashid Almas, and Salem Faraj.

As-Salam al-Amiri

Qatar adopted its current national anthem, As-Salam al-Amiri, on 6 December 1996, shortly after Hamad bin Khalifa Al Thani became emir. Composed by Abdulaziz Nasser Al Obaidan, an active musician since the 1960s, the lyrics are based on a poem written by Mubarak bin Saif Al Thani.

== Folk music traditions ==
A distinctive social tradition among the Persian Gulf people involves communal gatherings known as the "majlis", where friends and neighbors convene to discuss matters of mutual interest over cups of Arabic coffee. These gatherings occasionally serve as platforms for various forms of folk arts. In the past, the "dour," or spacious rooms designated for these gatherings, hosted seafarers, dhow captains (noukhadha), and enthusiasts of folk arts between pearl fishing seasons. Here, they engaged in al-samra, evenings of song and dance, celebrated during weddings and other occasions for entertainment.

At al-samra gatherings, singers accompanied by stringed instruments like the oud and occasionally the violin perform melodies while being joined by dancers performing al-zafan. This traditional dance, characterized by elegant movements and expressive gestures, symbolizes the hardships and joys of maritime life.

== Male folk music ==
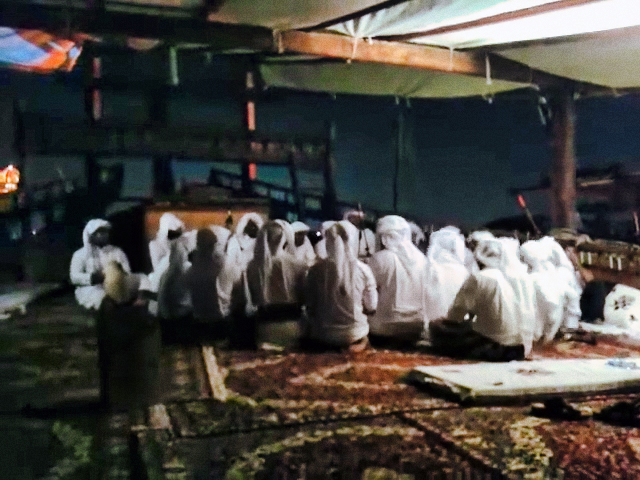
Fijiri music performed on a dhow in Qatar

Male folk music could be categorized as urban or sea music and work or non-work related. Work songs vary significantly depending on the environment. The pastoral setting differs from the agricultural, coastal, and urban environments, each possessing its own distinct culture, specific tasks, and forms of production. Qatar's environment is predominantly coastal due to its peninsular geography. Within this coastal setting, there exist songs whose rhythms are synchronized with various work movements such as pushing ships, hoisting sails, rowing oars, and pulling ropes.

Additionally, individual songs, not originally intended as work songs but borrowed from other contexts, appear to a lesser extent in Qatar's musical tradition. Common themes among these songs are love and marriage. An example of one such song is Tal al-Sadoud, which is about the affection one has for their partner. Despite not originally being a work song, this song has been frequently used on pearling trips as a reminder of the sailors' loved ones at home. Kuwaiti and Iraqi folk songs were often popular with Qatari sea-farers, for example, the Iraqi song Al Haliya which is sung in the wafir meter. Classical Qatari melodies share many similarities with their Gulf counterparts, and most of the same instruments are used.

=== Sea music ===
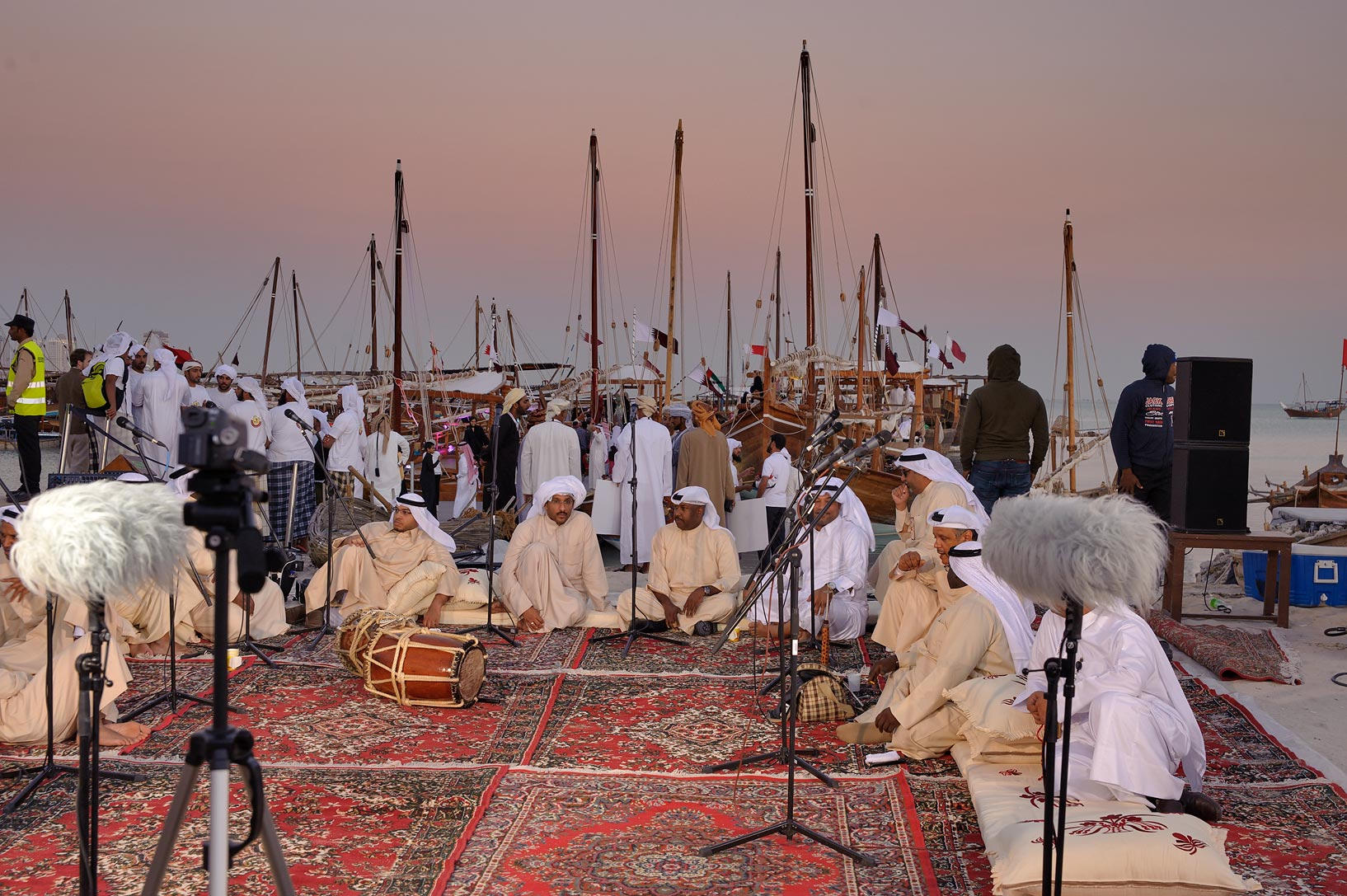
Music performance at the Qatar Dhow Festival

Work songs relating to the sea are the most recurrent type of folk music, particularly songs about pearl hunting. Each song, varying in rhythm, would narrate a different activity of the pearling trip, including spreading the sails, diving, and rowing the ships. Collective singing was integral to each pearling trip, and each boat had a designated singer, known locally as al naham. Singing was used to encourage crew members to work harder during the pearling drip and provide entertainment while resting. Furthermore, when the noukadha (captain) ordered the sails to be rigged, the crew would sing while the al naham would give praise to Allah and Muhammad. Such songs which praised Allah or asked for his blessing was known as a holo song.

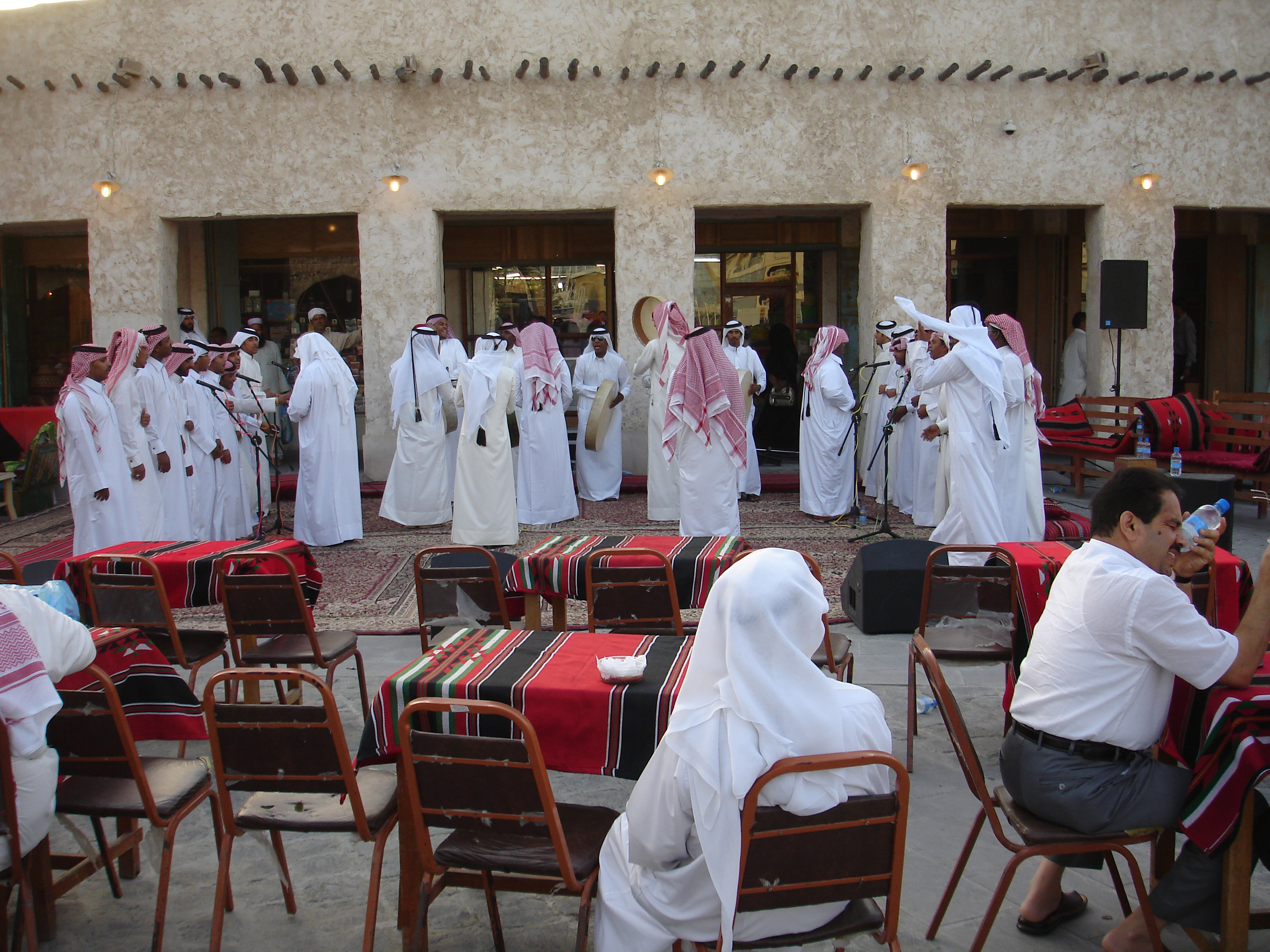
Qatari performers at Souq Waqif

Holo songs have simple melodies which often center around a single verse that is repeated, either by the al naham solely or as a group performance. This rhythmic phrase does not vary in vocal tone; instead, percussion instruments and clapping are used to amplify the melody.

A type of sea music known as fijiri originated from sea traditions and features group performances accompanied by melodic singing, rhythmic palm-tapping on water jars (known as galahs), and dances that mimic the movements of the sea waves. Various versions of al-fujairi, such as "al-bahri," "al-adsani," and "al-hadadi," are each characterized by unique performances and styles of dancing.

=== Dance ===
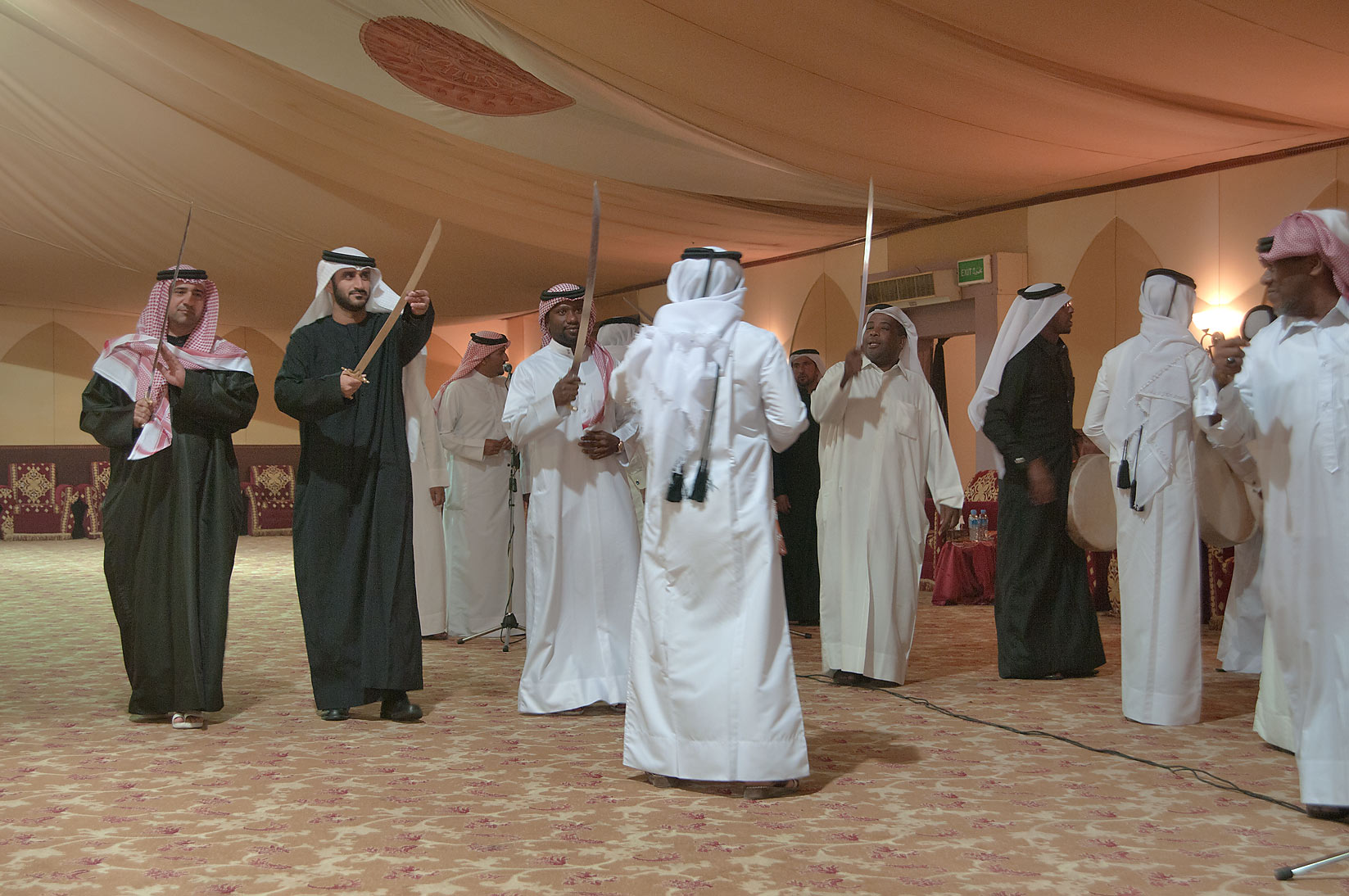
Ardah performance at a Qatari wedding

Ardah, a folkloric dance, is still practiced in Qatar. The dance is performed with two rows of men opposite of one another, each of whom may or may not be wielding a sword, and is accompanied by drums and spoken poetry. The two main types of ardah in the Persian Gulf states are land ardah (ardah barriyya) and sea ardah (ardah bahri). Qatar's ardah is a mixture of the two. In some performances, men wear land ardah attire at a beach setting and are supported by sea band drumming. It is sometimes performed on horseback. The historical purpose of ardah was to honor one's tribe and to showcase courage. It is considered a celebration of the highest degree and is performed at important events such as royal weddings, high-ranking governmental visits, and national feasts. It was also historically performed to mark the end of pearling season. During the ardah, participants take on specific roles: the shayyal leads with powerful chants, the ahl al-saff recite verses in unison, the ahl al-ʿaddah maintain rhythm with drums and tambourines, and the ahl al-sayf display choreographed sword movements.

Ardah performances are sometimes followed by razeef, a dance where the performer has his head in an upright position and is carrying a weapon. Typically performed during festive occasions such as Eid, razeef begins in the late afternoon following communal prayers. The performance commences when a banner (referred to as abraq) is raised in an open public space; participants wield swords and rifles as part of the choreography, and some onlookers may be invited to join in. Preparations for razeef begin one or two days before the event, with communal meetings and rehearsals. As the dance progresses, the group divides into two parallel lines, and a lead poet, or sha'ir, recites lines of poetry at the center, inspiring the chorus.

Tanboura was a simple type of folk dance performed by a group of men. Historically, it served a social function as it was believed the dancers would exorcise an evil spirit from the target of this dance and was rewarded handsomely. The dance consists of conflicting rhythmic movements and is dominated by a drum beat. An oud and manjur are also used. In modern times, this dance evolved to be used during celebratory occasions such as weddings and feasts. A dance with a similar historical purpose is called Liwa; this dance involves a large flute known as a sirttai, a tin container known as a tanaka, and loud singing.

During Ramadan, grain grinding would sometimes be accompanied by a dance known as dakelhab; the name being the Arabic term for grinding grains. Other dances include al matari, al samiri, and al rijali.

== Female folk music ==
Qatari women performers at a traditional wedding ceremony

Women primarily sang work songs associated with daily activities such as wheat grinding and cooking. The songs were performed collectively in small groups and varied in specificity - some pertained to general themes, whereas others were related to specific processes. In the past, women and men would perform alongside each other, but this later became less common.

Women would also sing when returning pearl ships were sighted. After a sighting was made, they would gather around the seashore where they would clap and sing about the hardships of pearl diving. One of the most popular Qatari folk songs of this nature is "Toub Toub Ya Bahar!", which roughly translates to "Ocean waters, repent!". This song was historically sung by women standing by the coastline, anxiously awaiting the safe return of their male family members from their pearl diving expeditions. The song is an impassioned plea, urging the sea to remain calm to ensure the safe return of their loved ones.

Fatma Shaddad is a pioneer in female folk music, forming the country's first-ever female band. Her band performed at venues throughout Qatar and had its music broadcast on Qatar Radio beginning in 1986. Her most popular song was Gharby hawakom ya ahl el Doha (Arabic: غربي هواكم يا أهل الدوحة), released in 1988, which was played and adapted by other artists all over the Persian Gulf region. The song was also played during Qatar's diplomatic functions. After her original band dissolved, in 1996 she founded the Nahda Women's Band for Folk Arts. In 2012, during the theatrical play of Al-Bushiya, Shaddad played the role of the grandmother Umm al-Khair, and introduced a novel element by performing Al-Nahham, a traditional sea music form typically sung by men during fishing trips. Her participation marked the first time a woman has performed this art on stage in the Persian Gulf.

=== Nursery rhymes and lullabies ===
Folk nursery rhymes serve as a medium for transmitting cultural values, educational information, and social norms to children within Qatari society. These rhymes often incorporate elements from the local surroundings, occupations, and traditions, facilitating the enculturation process from an early age. The most common type of nursery rhyme is commonly referred to as tasbeeha, or "morning songs".

Other types of folk rhymes exist, such as songs related to teething (al noon), the memorization of the Quran (al khattima), and religious songs. Lullabies, songs used to quiet the baby or lull them to sleep, are referred to locally as hadhada.

=== Dance ===
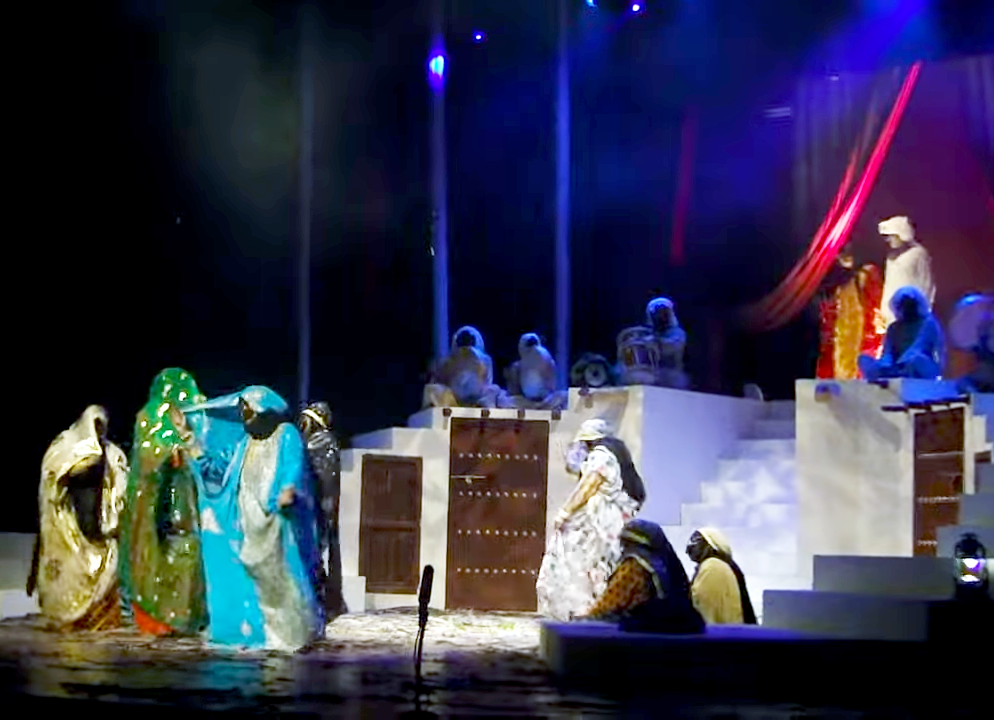
Qatari performers in colorful abayas dancing during a theatre performance

Public performances by women were practiced on two annual occasions. The first was al-moradah, which involved women and girls of all social classes gathering in a secluded area where they would sing and dance in embroidered clothes. This was usually done in the weeks preceding Eid al-Fitr and Eid al-Adha. It was one of the most popular musical practices among Qatari women in previous decades. Each moradah would begin with a prayer to Muhammad. After this, the women would praise tribal leaders and elders, repeating each verse twice before introducing a new verse. It was performed with two rows of women opposite each other, with the lead singers at the far ends, thus forming a three-sided rectangle. Moradah's dance consisted of all the women in each row swaying their bodies and moving their arms up and down while their hands were interlaced. For the most part, the practice was abandoned during the 1950s, though it is still sometimes practiced at the end of weddings. There have been efforts by Qatar's Ministry of Culture to reintegrate the practice into Qatari society.

The second occasion of collective public singing, known as al-ashori, was performed exclusively at weddings. There were two main instruments used during a performance: al douf (or daf), a type of tambourine, and al tabl, a longitudinal drum. Thematically, ashori songs are cheerful as they rejoice in the marriage that is taking place. The lyrics are derived from Nabati verse, a type of Arabic poetry and were generally symbiotic in nature. Ashori is still practiced by some classes of Qatari society.

== Children's folk music ==
Children's folk songs range from simple chants to melodic mawwals. Typically devoid of musical accompaniment, these songs were often characterized by hand clapping and rhythmic patterns, and comprised folk songs easily memorized by children. As children progressed through various developmental stages, folk songs tailored to each phase played a role in their upbringing, from lullabies soothing newborns to celebratory tunes marking milestones like teething and first steps. Moreover, social gatherings and communal events were celebrated by song.

Al-Tahmida, a chant venerating Muhammad, symbolized the completion of Quranic memorization, inspiring peers to follow suit. Taq Taq ya Mattar expressed joy at rainfall, while Bal-houta hadi amarna was chanted during lunar eclipses. Ihmido yal qalqani uplifted children, while Bil nafila yammul shahm wal lahm was sung during the mid-Sha'ban month's fast, signifying anticipation of treats from neighbors in a tradition called Garangao. On festive occasions like Eid al-Fitr, songs such as Baker Al-Eid and Al-Ayedoh united children and adults in joyful celebration.

Al-Farisa was a dance done only during Gurangao, a regional holiday that takes place on the 15th night of Ramadan. It would be performed by a group of young boys wearing a bisht and dakla who form a circle, which is then enclosed by a larger circle of adults. The conclusion of this dance would be with the arrival of a young boy on a fake horse with a play sword, which the boy then uses to duel the horse. The douf is used for this dance and is accompanied by singing.

== Folk music in poetry ==
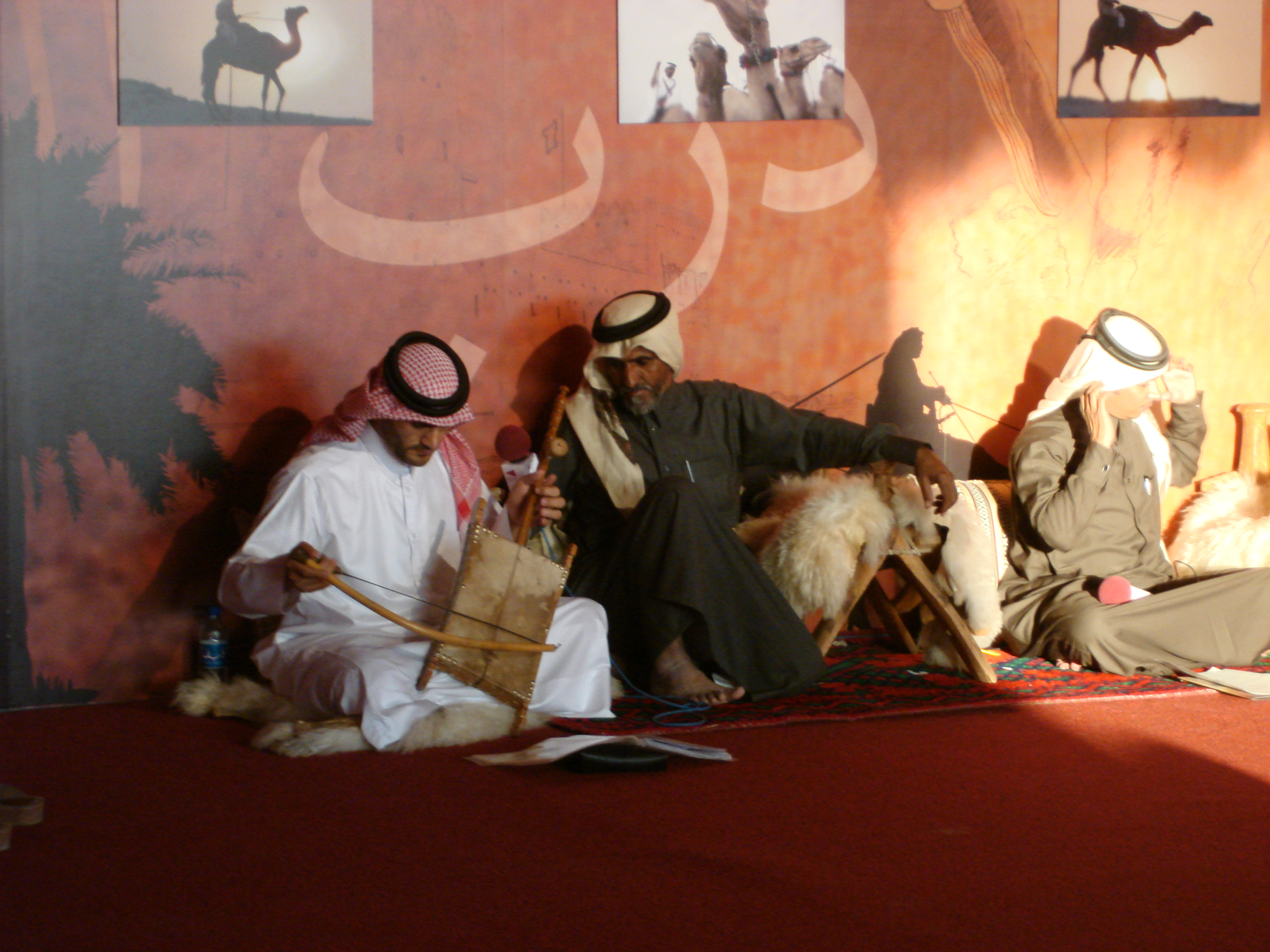
Qatari musician playing the rebaba

Nabati poetry, a type of poetry endemic to the Arabian Peninsula, is thought to represent the first vestiges of folk music in the region. Rababas were sometimes used during recitations of Nabati poetry, a practice referred to as rababa art. The rababa is a stringed instrument dominant in Bedouin culture, similar to the oud. While narrating their poem, which typically would be centered around the hardships of the desert or other such pains, the poet would slowly but rhythmically strum the rababa. Such performances have declined drastically in popularity in modern times, primarily due to their sorrowful nature.

== Folk instruments ==
Over 90 traditional folk songs, both urban and sea, have been recorded in the Arab States of the Persian Gulf, many employing percussion instruments and string instruments, while others use only simple clapping or foot stomping or employ all in conjunction.

Traditional musical instruments have undergone extensive refinement processes over time, resulting in their current compact forms. An example of this transformation is evident in the mirwas, which originally existed as a large, rudimentary drum but has since evolved into a smaller instrument, slightly larger than the palm, yet remains an integral component of folklore troupes.

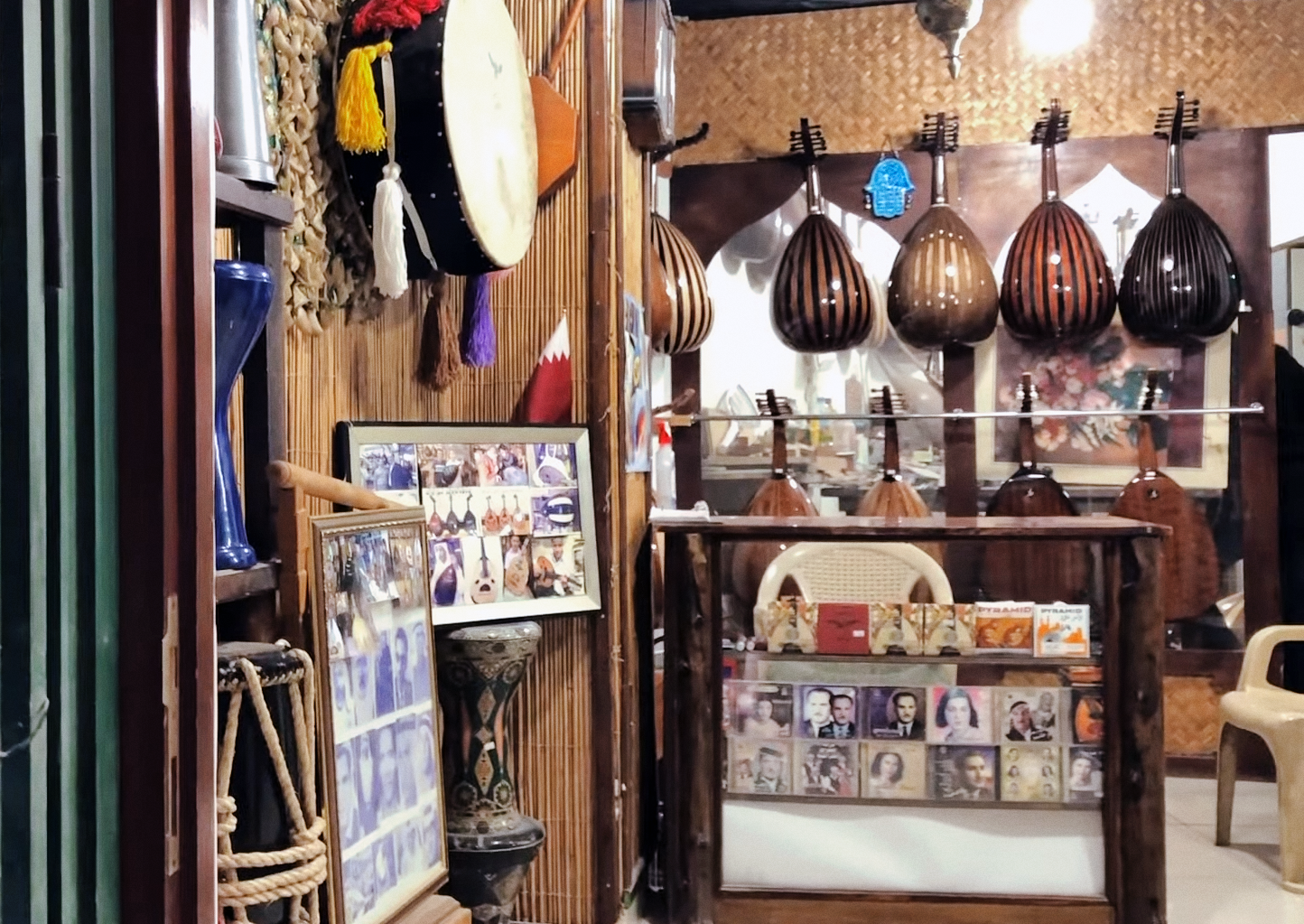
Instruments used in local music at Souq Waqif, including the oud on the right

Constructed from carved wooden tubes covered on both ends with goatskin, the mirwas was traditionally handcrafted by specialized artisans in the Persian Gulf region, where the leather coating industry flourished. However, contemporary manufacturing of the mirwas is predominantly conducted in India. Typically played by holding it with the fingertips of the left hand and striking it with the forefinger of the right hand, the rhythmic tapping of the mirwas complements various urban melodies and Gulf vocal songs, including "al-arabi", "al-shami", "al-rudmani", and "al-khayali".

In addition to the mirwas, several other traditional instruments are well known in the region. The douf, similar to a tambourine, features goatskin coating on one side, while the oud, resembling a violin, is a stringed instrument. Similarly, the rababa shares similarities with the oud. Galahs, a tall clay jar, was commonly used as a percussion instrument by pearl fishermen. Tin drinking cups known as tus or tasat were also used, usually in conjunction with a tabl, a longitudinal drum beaten with a stick.

Notably, hand-clapping (taṣfīq) is an essential musical instrument in Gulf musical traditions, accompanying vocal songs. In the Persian Gulf region, rhythmic clapping is performed by groups of men seated in rectangular formations around musicians, with participants ranging from 10 to 40. Clapping sessions typically begin with one to three individuals, gradually incorporating others with rhythmic variations and culminating in uniform clapping. While minor infractions may be acknowledged with a simple glance, repeated mistakes may result in exclusion from the session. Various clapping styles exist, including "grand clapping", "bizani", "al-khabab", and synchronized finger and tongue movements, each adhering to its own set of rules and conventions.

== Preservation of folk music ==
The first time an exhaustive study of Qatari folk music took place was in 1975, when the Department of Publishing and Publications at the Ministry of Information published a book of popular songs in Qatar, releasing it in four parts. Sheikh Hamad bin Suhaim Al Thani, who was minister of the Ministry of Information and Culture, commissioned Muhammad Talib Al-Duwayk to publish a new book on Qatar's music, resulting in the publishing of Al-ughniya al-sha biyya f Qatar (in English: The Folk Song in Qatar) in 1990. Released in two volumes, the book explores every aspect of Qatar's folk music and culture.

The Arab Gulf States Folklore Centre was founded in Doha, Qatar, in 1981 with the objective of preserving the region's culture and history, including folk music.

== Music organizations ==
=== Music institutions ===
In August 1980, the Ministry of Information established a subsidiary organization to serve as a music academy, referring to it as "the Institute". An academy building was provided to the institute by the government, and it began classes on 1 October 1980 with an initial capacity for 20 aspiring musicians.

In 2007, the Ministry of Culture inaugurated the Center of Music Affairs. It aims to disseminate musical knowledge, cultivate a new generation of musicians, and support initiatives that uphold and preserve the tradition of Qatari music. The center hosts an annual event known as "The Night of the Qatari Song", dedicated to celebrating the distinct qualities of Qatari music. It also serves as a venue for various musical and spoken word performances.

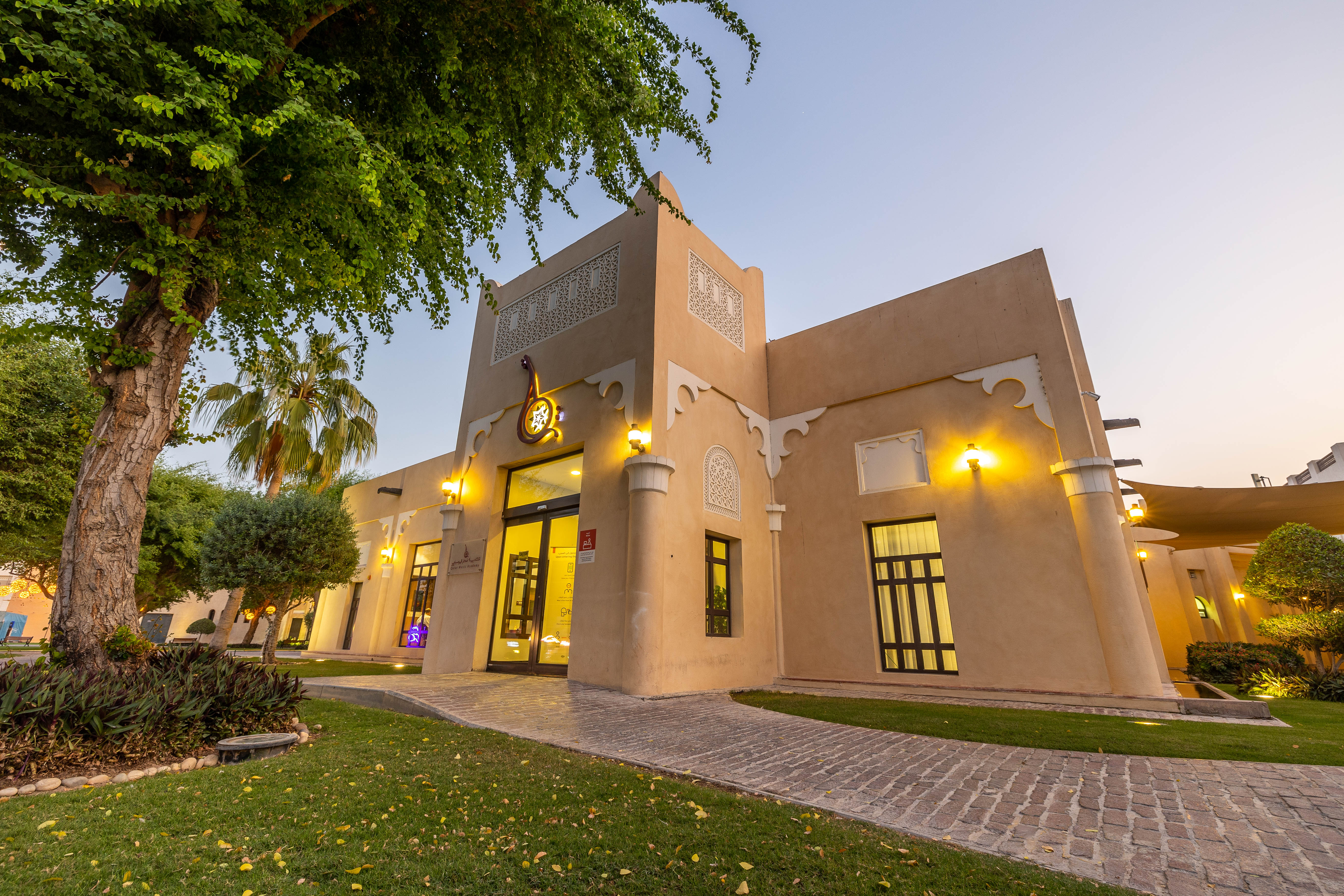
Qatar Music Academy

Qatar Foundation was responsible for commissioning the Qatar Music Academy in Katara Cultural Village in January 2011. Although the academy's primary focal point is providing musical education for children and teenagers from 5 to 18 years old, it also provides education for individuals not falling within that age bracket through its 'music for all' program.

=== Qatar Philharmonic Orchestra ===
The Qatar Philharmonic Orchestra was formed in 2007 at the behest of Qatar Foundation with an initial budget of $14 million.

=== Recording companies ===
The first Qatari record label was established in January 2015 by Dana Al Fardan as DNA Records.

== Festivals and concerts ==
Sawt Al-Khaleej Radio established the Doha Song Festival in February 2002.

Qatari Songs Night (Layl al-ughniya al-Qaṭariyya), an event where local singers perform traditional songs, took place for the first time in the Qatar National Theatre in 2020. It was organized by the Center of Music Affairs, a sub-department of the Ministry of Culture.

== Contemporary music ==
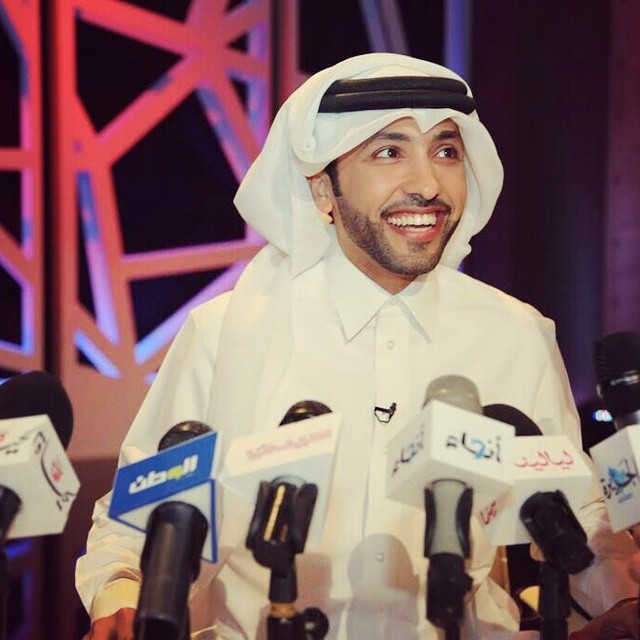
Qatari singer Fahad Al Kubaisi

Local music artists are subject to many barriers in Qatar, such as lack of awareness, high prices of recording studios and a deficiency of agents.

=== Arabic/gulf music ===
Many contemporary Qatari singers perform what is popularly known as khaliji ('gulf') music. Notable male artists in this genre include Fahad Al Kubaisi, the first artist out of the Arab states of the Persian Gulf to be nominated for a Grammy Award, Essa Al Kubaisi, Ali Abdul Sattar, and Bader Al Rayes.

As a tribute to renowned folk singer Salem Faraj, Mansour Al-Muhannadi remade his song Blessed Be Our Eid, composed by Qatari poet Khalifa Jumaan. Qatar TV produced the music video for this song and aired it throughout Eid al-Fitr.

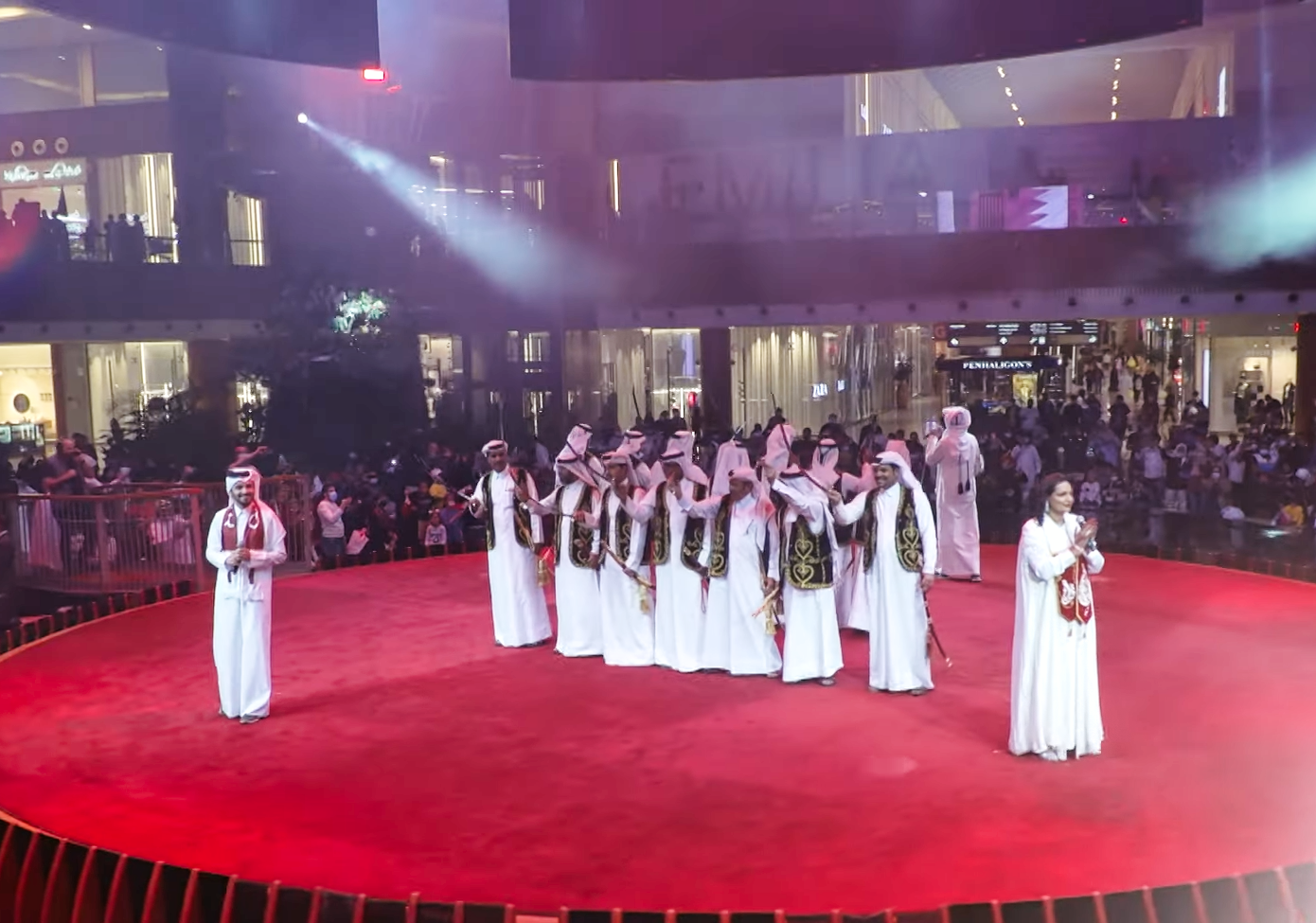
An ardah song being performed by Saoud Khalid and Farah Anwar during Qatar National Day

=== Patriotic music ===
Patriotic songs serve as a medium for expressing national identity and collective sentiment. These compositions have played a crucial role in shaping and reflecting public opinion, for instance, during the Qatar diplomatic crisis. The lyrical content of patriotic songs encompasses a wide range of themes, including religious devotion, martial prowess, love for the homeland, loyalty to leadership, and pride in national achievements. Common motifs include references to swords, symbolizing strength and heritage; flags and masts, representing national sovereignty; and elements of the local environment.

Patriotic songs are often released around Qatar National Day, on 18 December 2018. They may be accompanied by live musical performances that feature the ardah, with the dancers hoisting swords. The performances are broadcast on Qatar TV and other local stations. One of the most popular local artists singing such songs is Nayef Albishri, who performed Imar Ya Dar Althamimi, with the lyrics being authored by Khalid Al Boainain, and Ya Labba, with the lyrics being made by Abdullah Albeshri. Khalil Al Shabrami, a poet dubbed Shayr Al-Million, is another popular artist who sang Tamim Aali Mistawa, which was accompanied by an ardah performance.

Nadir Abdul Salam, an Indian musician and ambassador of Qatar Music Academy, is known for producing several patriotic songs, such as the official song of the 24th Arabian Gulf Cup, held in Qatar. He is also known for producing various Qatar National Day songs, including four in 2020 and three in 2019.

=== Metal/rock ===
Naser Mestarihi, a Qatari born Jordanian-Pakistani singer-songwriter and multi-instrumentalist, became the first rock/metal musician to release an album out of Qatar. He was also a member of Qatar's first-ever metal band Asgard Legionnaires.

=== Orchestral music ===
Dana Al Fardan, whose music has been described as "rooted in neoclassical music and electronic elements", made history by being the first artist from a Persian Gulf country to perform at the Cannes Film Festival in May 2024, presenting her song Indigo.

=== Martial music ===
Originating in 1949, Qatar's military music ensemble began with the introduction of the trumpet for various ceremonial purposes, including flag ceremonies and saluting. Over the years, the ensemble evolved into the Qatar Armed Forces Band Regiment, originally named the "Music Unit of the Armed Forces", established in 1954.

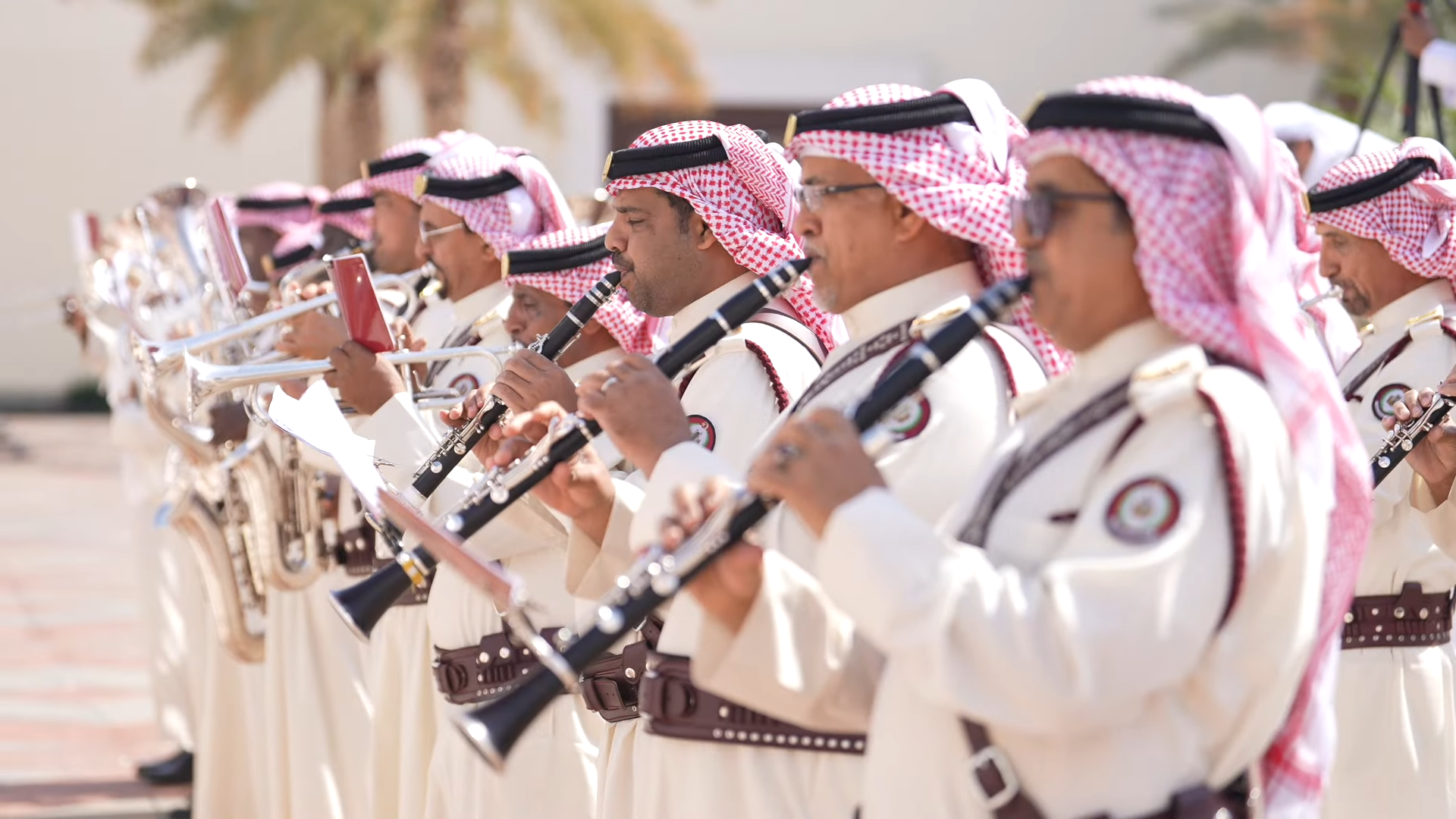
Qatar Armed Forces Band Regiment performing for the visit of Narendra Modi

From its humble beginnings, the music unit expanded to incorporate brass bands, bagpipers, and percussionists. The establishment of the first and second martial bands occurred in 1982. Subsequently, between 1998 and 2010, the establishment expanded to encompass four integrated music bands alongside the establishment of the Symphony Band Music School.

The role of the music school within the battalion is paramount, offering rigorous training programs for soldiers lasting 8–10 years. These programs encompass various musical courses, including foundational music training, progressive courses, and leadership training. Soldiers are taught to perform various musical pieces, including marches and waltzes, enabling them to participate in a multitude of ceremonies and events, such as National Sports Day, Qatar National Day and the opening ceremony of the 2022 FIFA World Cup.

Qatar's military music has not only played a crucial role in national ceremonies but has also represented the nation on the international stage. Foreign dignitaries are greeted at the Amiri Diwan with performances on arrival. The band regiment has participated in numerous international festivals across the Arab States of the Persian Gulf, Europe, the US, and China, showcasing Qatari songs intertwined with Western instrumentals, particularly bagpipes.
