= National Day (Qatar) =

Annual celebration hosted on 18 December

Qatar National Day
- Official name: Qatar National Day
- Observed by: Qatar
- Significance: National commemoration of Qatar's unification in 1878
- Date: 18 December
- Next time: 18 December 2026
- Frequency: Annually
- Related to: Jassim bin Mohammed Al Thani

Qatar National Day (Arabic: اليوم الوطني القطري, romanized: Al-Yawm al-Waṭani al-Qatari) is a national commemoration of Qatar's unification in 1878. It is celebrated annually on 18 December and is a national holiday by virtue of Law No. 11 of 2007, issued by the heir apparent and deputy emir Sheikh Tamim bin Hamad Al Thani. It is also known as Founder's Day.

== Observance ==
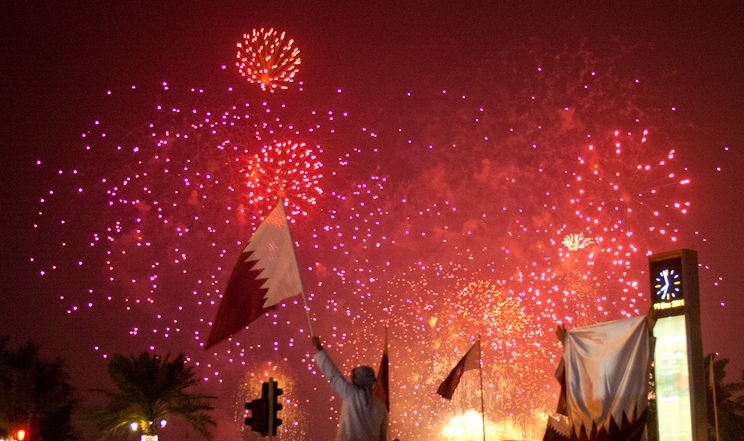
Fireworks celebration during Qatar National Day (2012)

The holiday is celebrated annually on 18 December. It is a national holiday and most of the public are given the day off from school and work. Prior to the emiri decree in June 2007, Qatar National Day was celebrated annually on 3 September, the day of Qatar's independence.

== Activities ==
Several activities are organized during the week of observance. These include:

- Fireworks show: Includes music, lights and fireworks.
- National Day Parade: Members of the general public parade through the Doha Corniche. Officials from the Armed Forces, ISF, Ministry of Interior, and Amiri Guard also participate in the parade.
- National Day celebrations at Katara Cultural Village: Festivities and over 20 heritage-themed events are held.
- Classic Car Show: Antique cars formerly owned by government officials are showcased.

The 2022 FIFA World Cup final intentionally coincided with that year's National Day, as with the 2021 and 2025 FIFA Arab Cup finals.

== Purpose and significance ==
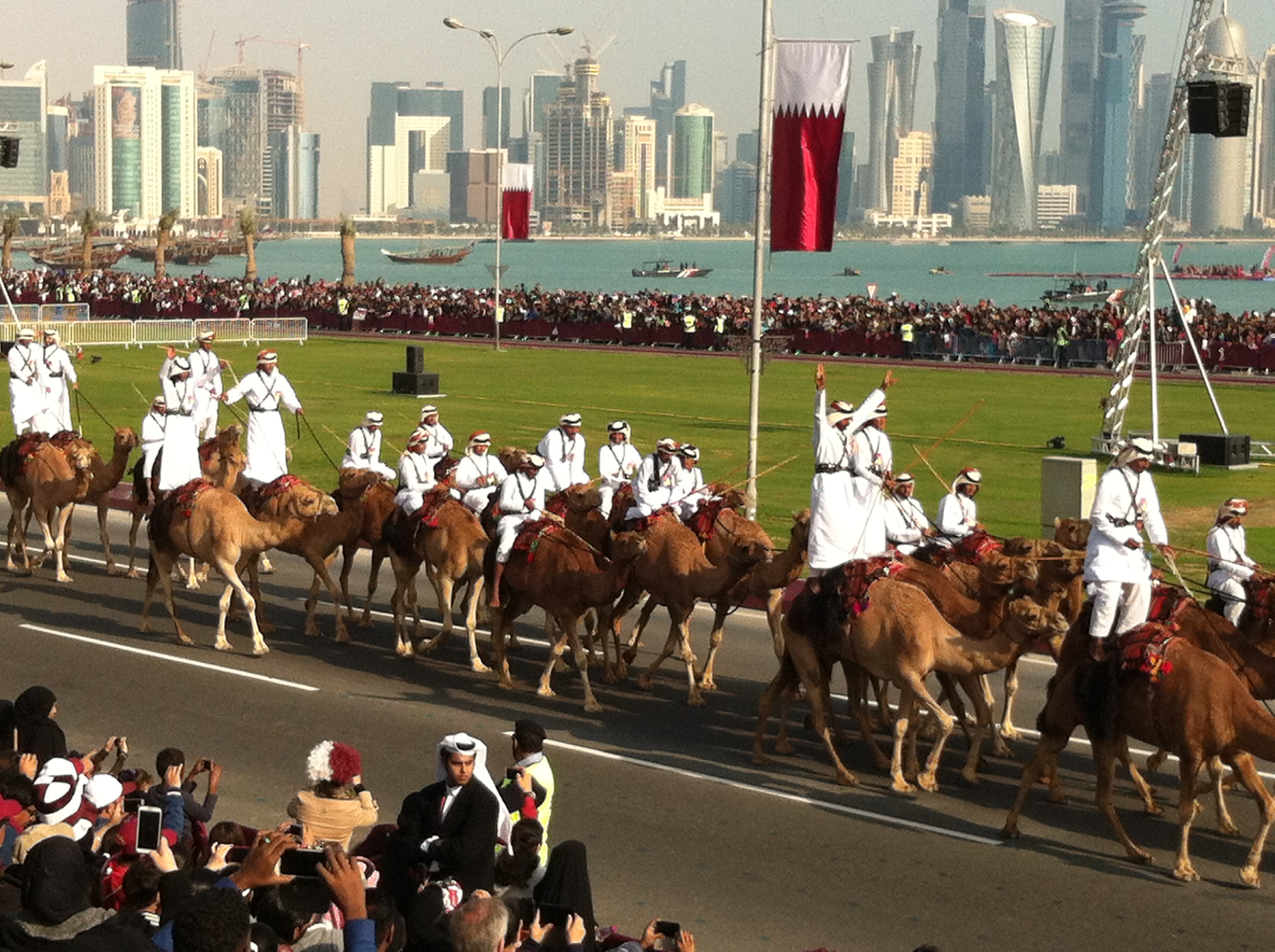
A parade taking place in Doha (2013)

On 18 December 1878, Jassim bin Mohammed Al Thani succeeded his father, Mohammed bin Thani, as ruler of the Qatari Peninsula. He was deemed to have unified all the local tribes by combating external forces, such as the British. He also earned a considerable degree of autonomy for the tribes of the peninsula.

The holiday has been instrumental in developing a sense of national identity and is celebrated by locals and expats alike. It is seen by the government as a method for preserving local culture.

== National Day Parade ==
The National Day Parade is held annually on the occasion of Qatar National Day on 18 December.

== Darb Al Saai ==
The Darb Al Saai festival, organized by Qatar's Ministry of Culture, is held annually in early December. The event runs daily for several days until National Day on 18 December and showcases the nation's cultural heritage and national identity. The name translates to "route of the messenger" in Arabic, and is related to the path taken by Sheikh Jassim bin Mohammed Al Thani's messengers.

Activities include the ceremonial flag-raising at Flag Square, accompanied by military performances and displays, including horse and camel-mounted contingents, and live performances of sea music. Workshops offer hands-on experiences in wool weaving, tent fabric-making, and bird photography. Educational workshops are also offered, such as Al Shaqab's seminar on Arabian horses at the 2023 edition, and the Ministry of Culture's workshops on falconry and camel riding.

Spanning a 150,000 m^{2} (1,600,000 sq ft) area in Umm Salal Mohammed, the venue's design blends traditional Qatari architecture with modern elements. Three arterial roads provide access to the venue, as well as the Doha Metro's Green Line. Prior to being relocated to Umm Salal Mohammed, the festival was held in the Al Sadd district of Doha. Several commercial establishments are found at Darb Al Saai Market, all with traditional names and selling local souvenirs, clothing and cuisine, including several cafés offering Arabic coffee.

Due to the COVID-19 pandemic, the 2020 edition of the Darb Al Saai was canceled. The 2021 edition was also canceled as the new primary venue for festivities in Umm Salal Mohammed would not be ready until 2022. Instead, several small-scall activities preceding Qatar National Day at multiple venues were planned for that year.

== Gallery ==
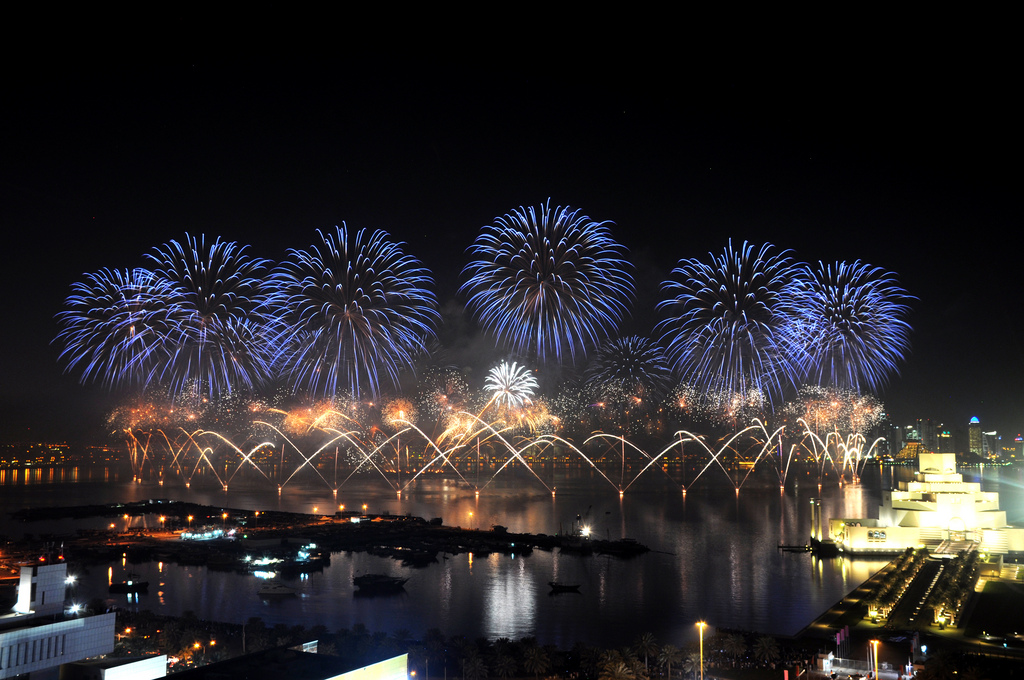
Fireworks celebration during Qatar National Day (2010)

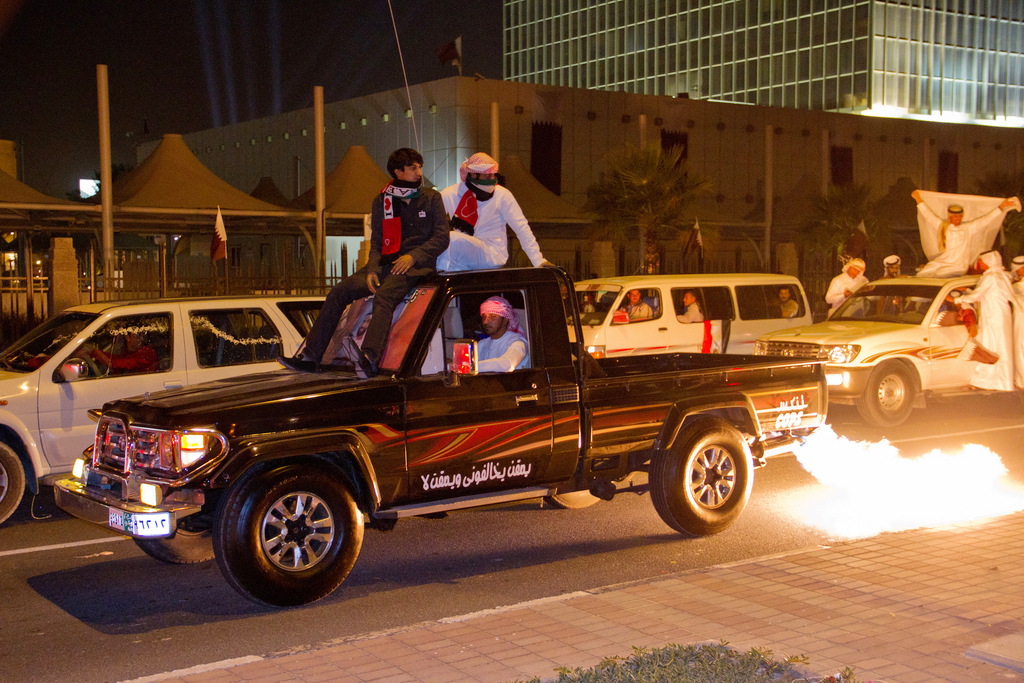
Foreigners participating in the night parade of the Qatar National Day

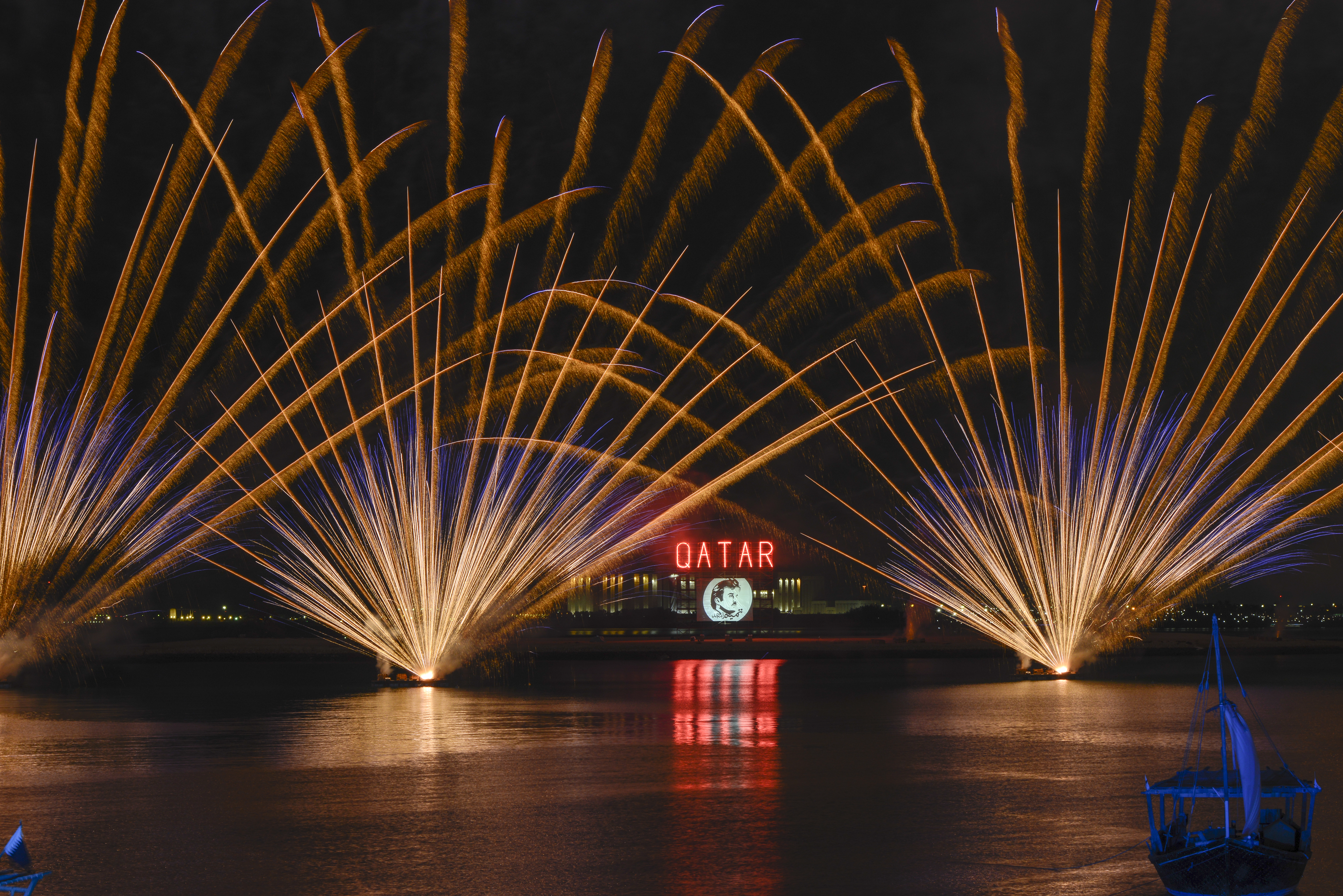
Qatar National Day 2017 Musical Fireworks Celebration at Corniche, Doha, State of Qatar

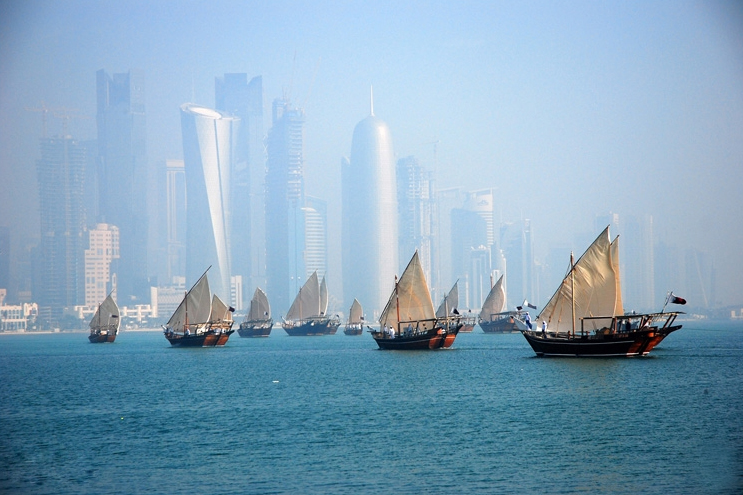
Dhow parade during Qatar National Day (2012)

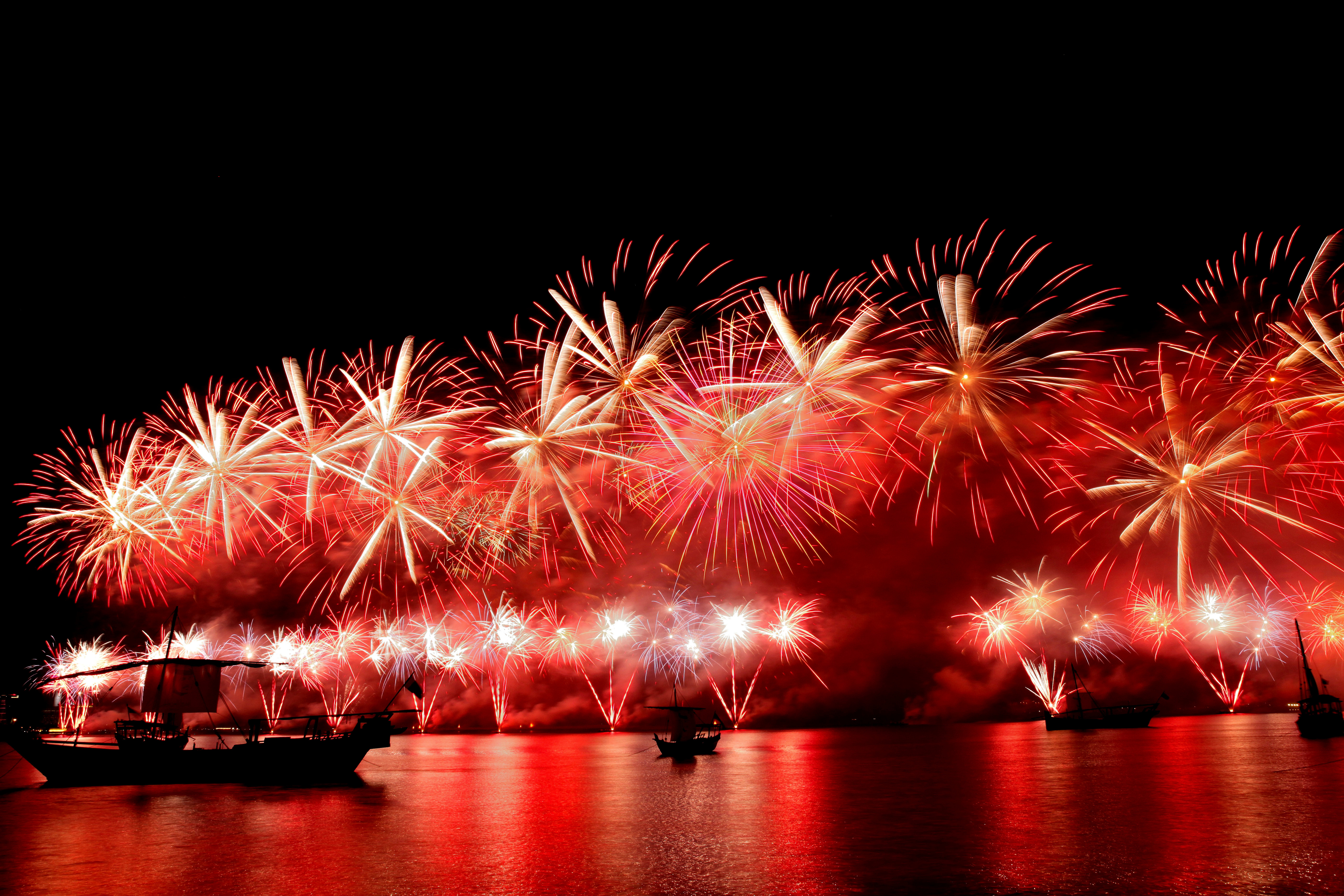
Qatar National Day 2017 Musical Fireworks
