= Military ranks of Qatar =

The Military ranks of Qatar are the military insignia forces used by the Qatar Armed Forces.

== Commissioned officer ranks ==
The rank insignia of commissioned officers.

Rank group	General / flag officers				Senior officers			Junior officers
Qatari Emiri Land Force
Qatari Emiri Land Force	فريق أول; Fariq 'awal	فريق; Fariq	لواء; Liwa	عميد; Amid	عقيد; Aqid	مقدم; Muqaddam	رائد; Ra'id	نقيب; Naqib	ملازم أول; Mulazim awwal	ملازم; Mulazim
Qatari Emiri Navy
Qatari Emiri Navy	فريق أول; Fariq 'awal	فريق; Fariq	لواء; Liwa	عميد; Amid	عقيد; Aqid	مقدم; Muqaddam	رائد; Ra'id	نقيب; Naqib	ملازم أول; Mulazim awwal	ملازم; Mulazim
Qatar Emiri Air Force
Qatar Emiri Air Force	فريق أول; Fariq 'awal	فريق; Fariq	لواء; Liwa	عميد; Amid	عقيد; Aqid	مقدم; Muqaddam	رائد; Ra'id	نقيب; Naqib	ملازم أول; Mulazim awwal	ملازم; Mulazim
Qatar Amiri Guard
Qatar Amiri Guard		فريق; Fariq	لواء; Liwa	عميد; Amid	عقيد; Aqid	مقدم; Muqaddam	رائد; Ra'id	نقيب; Naqib	ملازم أول; Mulazim awwal	ملازم; Mulazim
Rank group	General / flag officers				Senior officers			Junior officers

== Other ranks ==
The rank insignia of non-commissioned officers and enlisted personnel.

Rank group	Senior NCOs				Junior NCOs		Enlisted
Qatari Emiri Land Force							No insignia
Qatari Emiri Land Force	وكيل اول; Wakil awwal	وكيل ثاني; Wakil thani	رقيب; Raqib	نائب; Nayib	عريف; Earif	وكيل عريف; Wakil earif	جندي; Jundi
Qatari Emiri Navy							No insignia
Qatari Emiri Navy	وكيل اول; Wakil awwal	وكيل ثاني; Wakil thani	رقيب; Raqib	نائب; Nayib	عريف; Earif	وكيل عريف; Wakil earif	جندي; Jundi
Qatar Emiri Air Force							No insignia
Qatar Emiri Air Force	وكيل اول; Wakil awwal	وكيل ثاني; Wakil thani	رقيب; Raqib	نائب; Nayib	عريف; Earif	وكيل عريف; Wakil earif	جندي; Jundi
Rank group	Senior NCOs				Junior NCOs		Enlisted
