= Qatar Armed Forces =

Combined military forces of Qatar

- القوات المسلحة القطرية
- Founded: 1971
- Service branches: Qatari Emiri Land Force; Qatari Emiri Navy; Qatar Emiri Air Force; Qatar Amiri Guard
- Headquarters: Doha

Leadership
- Commander-in-chief: Sheikh Tamim bin Hamad Al Thani
- Prime minister: Mohammed bin Abdulrahman bin Jassim Al Thani
- Minister of State for Defence Affairs: Sheikh Saoud bin Abdulrahman Al Thani
- Chief of Staff: Lieutenant General Jassim bin Mohammed bin Ahmed Al Mannai

Personnel
- Military age: 18 years of age
- Active personnel: 26,550: Army 12,500; Navy 4,500; Air Force 5,000; Air Defense 2,650; Special Forces 1,900
- Reserve personnel: 4,000

Expenditure
- Budget: US$17 billion (2026)
- Percent of GDP: 6.5% (2026)

Industry
- Domestic suppliers: Barzan Holdings
- Foreign suppliers: Australia; Brazil; Canada; China; France; Germany; Italy; Japan; South Korea; Netherlands; Pakistan; Taiwan; Turkey; United Kingdom; United States

Related articles
- History: Gulf War; Libyan Civil War; Saudi Arabian-led intervention in Yemen; Syrian Civil War; 2026 Iran War
- Ranks: Military ranks of Qatar

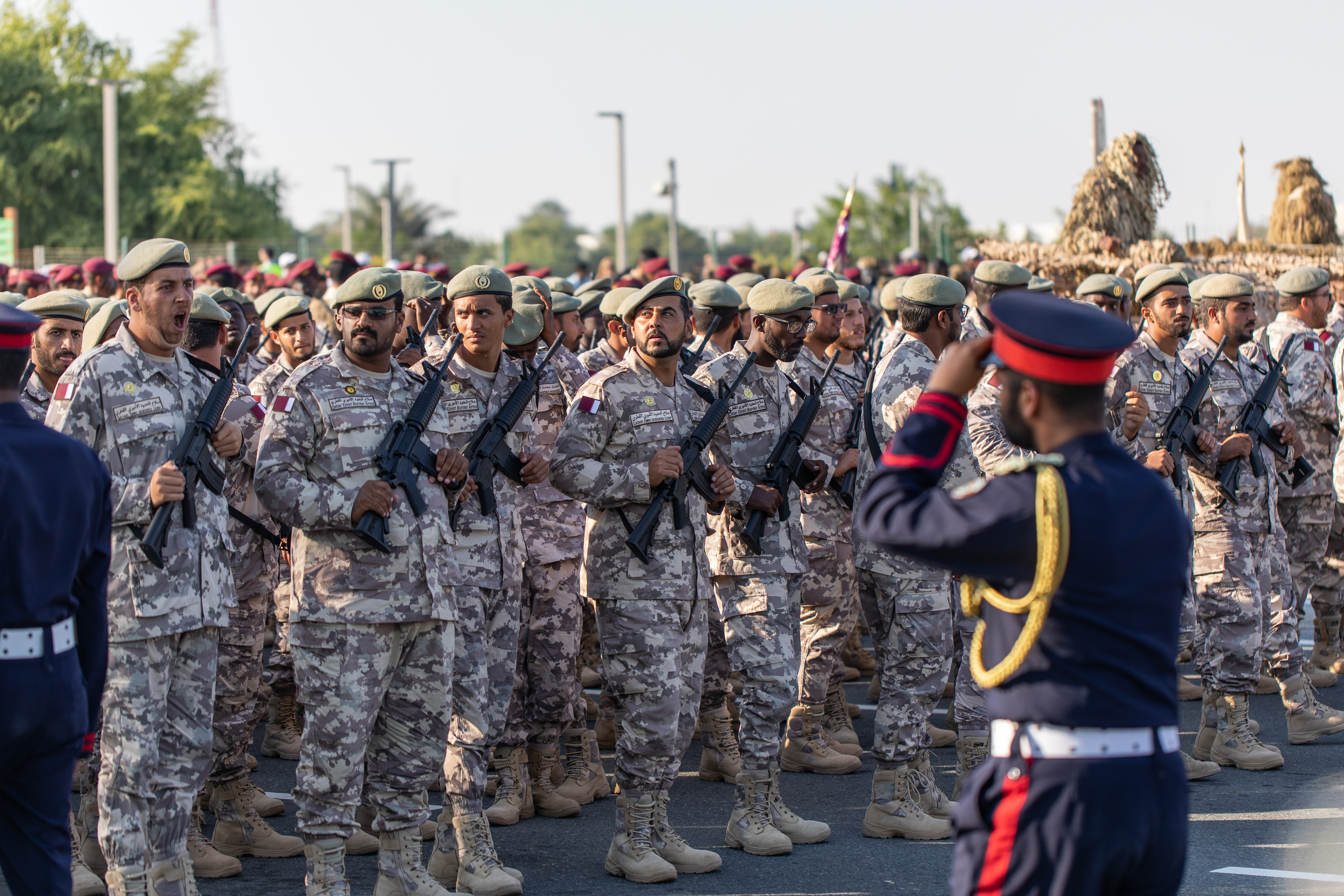
Soldiers at a military parade on Qatar National Day, 18 December 2018.

The Qatar Armed Forces (Arabic: القوات المسلحة القطرية, romanized: Al-Quwwat Al-Musallahah Al-Qatariyyah) are the military forces of the State of Qatar. Since 2015, Qatar has implemented compulsory military service with an average of 2,000 graduates per year. As of 2010, Qatar's defence expenditures added up to a total of $1.913 billion, about 1.5% of the national GDP, according to the SIPRI. Qatar has recently signed defence pacts with the United States in 2002 and 2013, with the United Kingdom in 2020, and with France in 1994.

Qatar plays an active role in the collective defense efforts of the Gulf Cooperation Council; the other five members are Saudi Arabia, Kuwait, Bahrain, the UAE, and Oman. Qatar also hosts the largest American military base in the Middle East and in 2017 inaugurated a military attache office in Washington.

SIPRI states that Qatar's plans to transform and significantly enlarge its armed forces have accelerated in 2014, and in 2010-14 Qatar was the 46th largest arms importer in the world. Orders in 2013 for 562 tanks and 75 self-propelled guns from Germany were followed in 2014 by a number of other contracts, including 34 combat helicopters and 3 AEW aircraft from the US, and 6 tanker aircraft from Spain. As of 2016, Qatar maintains advanced anti-air and anti-ship capabilities with deliveries of Patriot PAC-3 MSE batteries, Exocet MM40 Block 3 and Marte ER anti-ship missiles.

Reports indicate that between 2014 and 2024, Qatar significantly enhanced its military capabilities, with defense spending rising by 434%. These accounts also suggest that a substantial portion of the arms trade during this period was marred by corruption, including instances of bribery.

On 8 November 2024, for the first time a NATO military committee visited Qatar's military education and training facilities.

== History ==
The armed forces were founded in 1971 after the country gained independence from the United Kingdom.

With a personnel strength of 16,500, Qatar's armed forces are the second-smallest in the Middle East. France has provided approximately 80% of Qatar's arms inventory. Qatar took part in the Gulf War of 1991, with a battalion at the Battle of Khafji. It also hosted the U.S. 614th Tactical Fighter Squadron and the Canadian Air Task Group with 26 CF-18s both at Doha.

Since the Gulf War, Qatar has pursued a limited program of force modernization. Qatar has spent $12 billion to buy MIM-104 Patriot surface to air missiles. In July 2008, the US Defense Security Cooperation Agency announced Qatar's official request for logistics support, training, and associated equipment and services. The total value of the support arrangements could be as high as $400 million.

In March 2011, Qatar announced the participation of its Air Force in the enforcement of the Libyan no-fly zone.

=== Saudi Arabian-led intervention in Yemen ===
According to Aljazeera news, in December 2016, Qatar deployed 1,000 ground troops in Yemen to fight on behalf of the ousted president Abdrabbuh Mansur Hadi. Qatari soldiers, backed by 200 armoured vehicles and 30 Apache helicopters, headed to Yemen's Marib province.

The Armed Forces of Qatar have suffered 4 killed and 2 wounded during their deployment in Yemen.

=== Humanitarian Aid ===
Gaza

Following the start of Israeli military operations in the enclave after the October 7 attacks, a significant number of Palestinians in Gaza, estimated at 2.2 million, are now confronted with the imminent risk of famine. The Qatari Armed Forces have played a significant role in offering assistance to the Palestinians in Gaza. Thus far, a grand total of 91 aircraft have been dispatched, each laden with numerous tons of much-needed assistance. In a significant development, on April 8, 2024, they accomplished the successful evacuation of the 22nd group of injured Palestinians, marking a significant milestone since the commencement of the Gaza war.

Afghanistan

On May 16, 2024, a Qatar Armed Forces aircraft delivered 42 tons of food and shelter from the Qatar Red Crescent Society and Qatar Charity to Mazar-i-Sharif, Afghanistan.Qatar Charity (QC) also sent three aircraft delivering sixty tons of relief goods to Balkh flood victims via the Qatar Emiri Air Force airlift. Additionally, Qatar Red Crescent Society (QRCS) will build 10 health centers in Afghanistan to serve hundreds of thousands of women and children.

Sudan

On August 14, 2024, two Qatari Armed Forces aircraft arrived at Port Sudan Airport, delivering 27 tons of relief aid and shelter supplies to support flood victims in Sudan. The aid was provided by the Qatar Fund for Development (QFFD), Qatar Charity, and the Qatar Red Crescent Society. This is part of Qatar's ongoing humanitarian air bridge to Sudan, initiated in May 2023 in response to the country's ongoing conflict and natural disasters.

=== 2026 Iran war ===
On 2 March 2026, Qatar downed two Iranian Su-24 bombers during the 2026 Iran war. One Iranian fighter jet pilot was killed in the strike. Three Iranian fighter jet pilots were captured by the armed forces.

== Military branches ==
=== Qatari Emiri Land Force ===
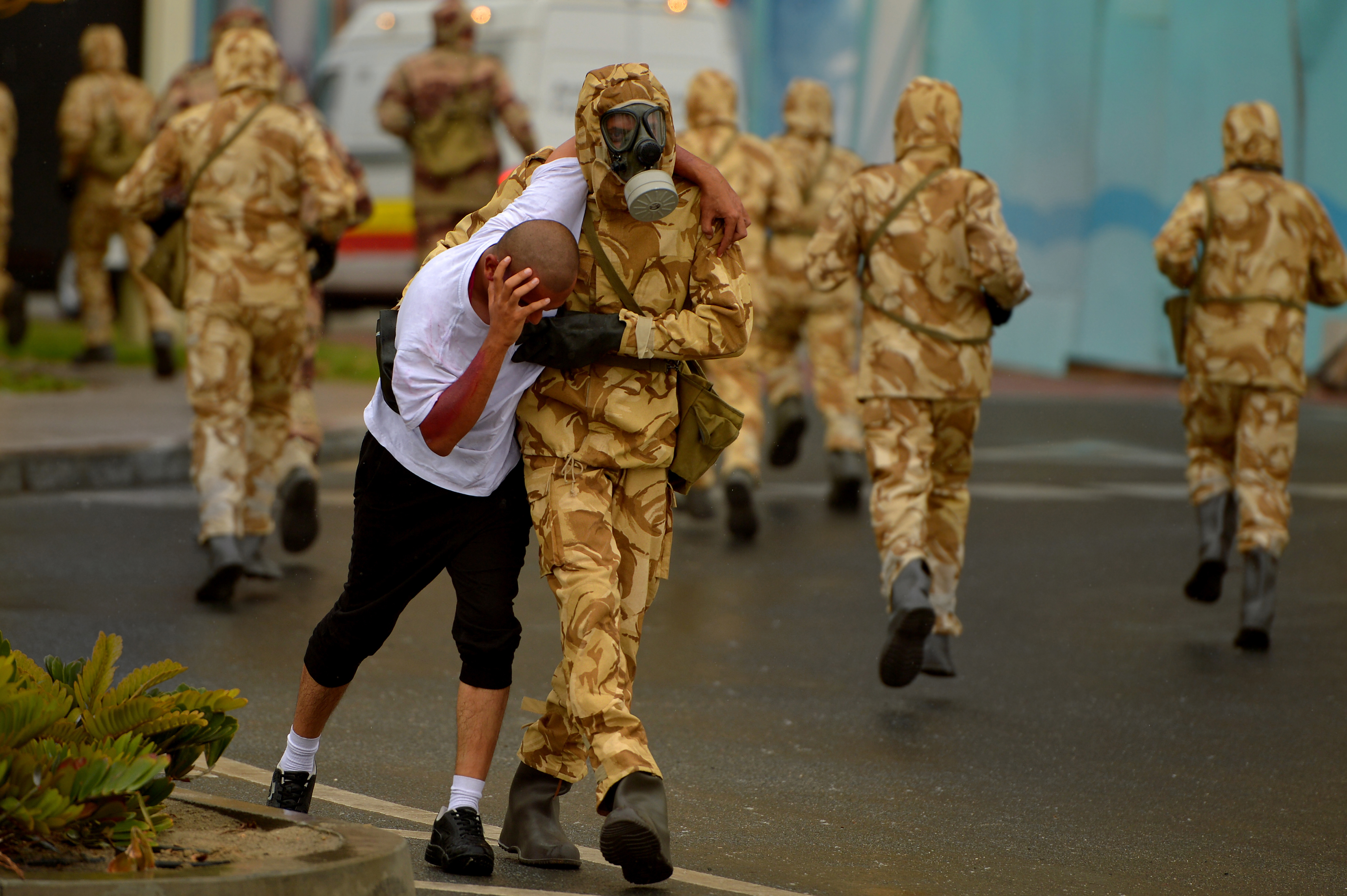
Qatar Armed Forces in training.

The Qatar Emiri Land Force is the largest land service branch of the Qatar Armed Forces. Initially outfitted with British weaponry, Qatar shifted much of its procurement to France during the 1980s in response to French efforts to develop closer relations. The tank battalion was equipped with French-built AMX-30 main battle tanks, before later being replaced by German Leopard 2A7's. Other armored vehicles include French AMX-10P APCs and the French VAB, adopted as the standard wheeled combat vehicle. The artillery unit has a few French 155 mm self-propelled howitzers. The principal antitank weapons are French MILAN and HOT wire-guided missiles.

Qatar had also illicitly acquired a few Stinger shoulder-fired SAMs, possibly from Afghan rebel groups, at a time when the United States was trying to maintain tight controls on Stingers in the Middle East. When Qatar refused to turn over the missiles, the United States Senate in 1988 imposed a ban on the sale of all weapons to Qatar. The ban was repealed in late 1990 when Qatar satisfactorily accounted for its disposition of the Stingers.

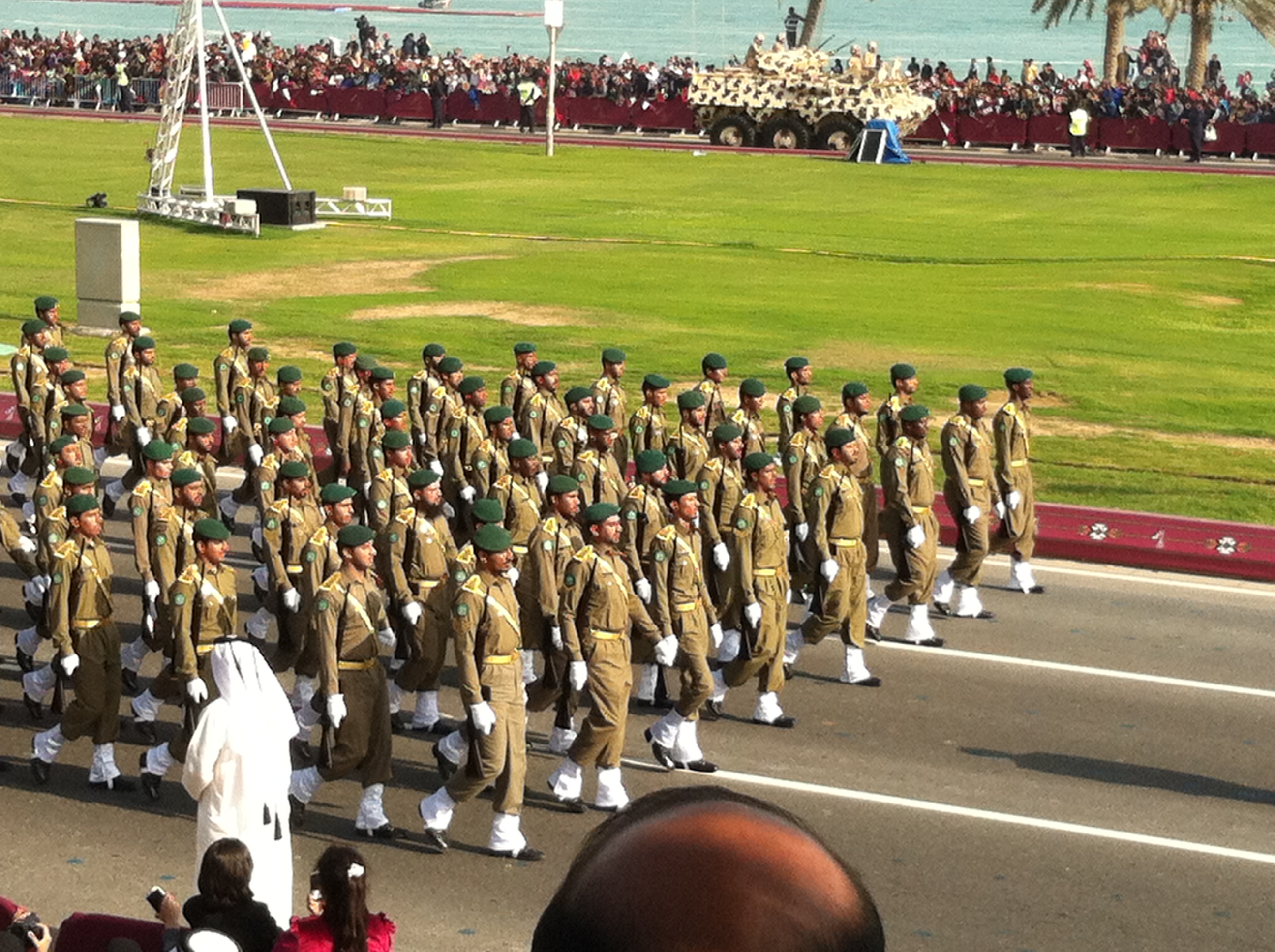
Qatar Armed Forces in National Day celebrations on the Doha Corniche.

Qatari tank battalion fought in the Gulf war in 1991, their AMX-30s took part in the battle of Khafji. Qatari contingent, composed mostly of Pakistani recruits, acquitted itself well during the war.

Qatar signed a contract with the German defence company Krauss-Maffei Wegmann (KMW) for the delivery of 24 artillery systems PzH 2000 and 62 LEOPARD 2 main battle tanks.

The US DSCA announces that Qatar wants to join its neighbor the UAE, and field 2 medium-range THAAD batteries of its own.

Their request is worth up to $6.5 billion, and includes up to 12 THAAD Launchers, 150 THAAD missiles, 2 THAAD Fire Control and Communications units, 2 AN/TPY-2 THAAD Radars, and 1 Early Warning Radar (EWR). The USA would also sell them the required trucks, generators, electrical power units, trailers, communications equipment, fire unit test & maintenance equipment, system integration and checkout, repair and return, training, and other support.

==== Major Army Units examples ====
- Royal Guard Brigade
  - 1st Infantry Battalion
  - 2nd Infantry Battalion
  - 3rd Infantry Battalion
- Qatari Army
  - Special Forces Support Group Company
  - 1st Mechanized Infantry Battalion
  - 2nd Mechanized Infantry Battalion
  - 3d Mechanized Infantry Battalion
  - 4th Mechanized Infantry Battalion (Reserve)
  - Artillery Battalion
    - Artillery Battery
    - Artillery Battery
    - Artillery Battery
    - Artillery Battery
    - Anti-aircraft Battery
- Armored Brigade
  - Mortar Company
  - Tank Battalion
  - Mechanized Infantry Battalion
  - Anti-tank Battalion

=== Qatari Emiri Navy ===
The Qatari Emiri Navy (QEN), also called the Qatari Emiri Naval Forces (QENF), is the naval branch of the armed forces of the State of Qatar.

=== Qatar Emiri Air Force ===
The Qatar Emiri Air Force was formed in 1974, three years after achieving independence from Great Britain in 1971. Initially equipped with ex-RAF Hawker Hunters, the air force soon began expansion with six Dassault/Dornier Alpha Jets in 1979. Fourteen Dassault Mirage F1 were delivered between 1980 and 1984. After the Gulf War, Qatar's air force infrastructure was upgraded by France for $200 million, leading to the order of nine single seat Mirage 2000-5DEA multi-role combat aircraft and three two seat Mirage 2000-5DDA combat trainers in August 1994. Deliveries started in December 1997, and involved the buy back of the remaining 11 Mirage F1s by France that were later sold on to Spain. The current commander of the Qatar Emiri Air Force is Brigadier General Mubarak Mohammed Al Kumait Al Khayarin.

British pilots in Oman remain on duty with the air force, and French specialists are employed in a maintenance capacity. Nevertheless, an increasing number of young Qataris have been trained as pilots and technicians. The past decade saw Qatar increase its air force with 96 planes from three different countries: the F-15 from the US, France's Rafale, and the Eurofighter Typhoon from the UK.

Its units include:

- No. 1 Fighter Wing
  - No. 7 Air Superiority Squadron – Dassault Mirage 2000
    - 9 single-seat Mirage 2000-5EDA
    - 3 2000-5DDA trainers
  - No. 11 Close Support Squadron – Dassault/Dornier Alpha Jet
- No. 2 Rotary Wing
  - No. 6 Close Support Squadron – Eurocopter SA342
  - No. 8 Anti-Surface Vessel Squadron – Westland Sea King Commando Mk 3
  - No. 9 Multi-Role Squadron – Westland Sea King Commando Mk 2
- Qatar Amiri Flight – C-17 Globemaster III

== Rank structure ==
The rank insignia of commissioned officers.

Rank group	General / flag officers				Senior officers			Junior officers
Qatari Emiri Land Force
Qatari Emiri Land Force	فريق أول; Fariq 'awal	فريق; Fariq	لواء; Liwa	عميد; Amid	عقيد; Aqid	مقدم; Muqaddam	رائد; Ra'id	نقيب; Naqib	ملازم أول; Mulazim awwal	ملازم; Mulazim
Qatari Emiri Navy
Qatari Emiri Navy	فريق أول; Fariq 'awal	فريق; Fariq	لواء; Liwa	عميد; Amid	عقيد; Aqid	مقدم; Muqaddam	رائد; Ra'id	نقيب; Naqib	ملازم أول; Mulazim awwal	ملازم; Mulazim
Qatar Emiri Air Force
Qatar Emiri Air Force	فريق أول; Fariq 'awal	فريق; Fariq	لواء; Liwa	عميد; Amid	عقيد; Aqid	مقدم; Muqaddam	رائد; Ra'id	نقيب; Naqib	ملازم أول; Mulazim awwal	ملازم; Mulazim
Qatar Amiri Guard
Qatar Amiri Guard		فريق; Fariq	لواء; Liwa	عميد; Amid	عقيد; Aqid	مقدم; Muqaddam	رائد; Ra'id	نقيب; Naqib	ملازم أول; Mulazim awwal	ملازم; Mulazim
Rank group	General / flag officers				Senior officers			Junior officers

The rank insignia of non-commissioned officers and enlisted personnel.

Rank group	Senior NCOs				Junior NCOs		Enlisted
Qatari Emiri Land Force							No insignia
Qatari Emiri Land Force	وكيل اول; Wakil awwal	وكيل ثاني; Wakil thani	رقيب; Raqib	نائب; Nayib	عريف; Earif	وكيل عريف; Wakil earif	جندي; Jundi
Qatari Emiri Navy							No insignia
Qatari Emiri Navy	وكيل اول; Wakil awwal	وكيل ثاني; Wakil thani	رقيب; Raqib	نائب; Nayib	عريف; Earif	وكيل عريف; Wakil earif	جندي; Jundi
Qatar Emiri Air Force							No insignia
Qatar Emiri Air Force	وكيل اول; Wakil awwal	وكيل ثاني; Wakil thani	رقيب; Raqib	نائب; Nayib	عريف; Earif	وكيل عريف; Wakil earif	جندي; Jundi
Rank group	Senior NCOs				Junior NCOs		Enlisted

== See also ==
- Qatar Armed Forces Band Regiment
- As Sayliyah Army Base
