= Bahrain Defence Forces Music Band =

The Bahrain Defence Forces Music Band (Arabic: فرقة موسيقى قوات الدفاع البحرينية) is the official musical unit of the Bahrain Defence Force.

== History ==
The band was created on 26 July 1969 with 52 members under the Military Training Center. It was originally referred to as the Music Wing. In 1971, the first class of music students graduated and the Music Wing became independent from the training center. Between 1972 and 1974, forty-five students from the second batch of the music course were trained. It also consisted of sixty members of the Band of the Ministry of Interior (known commonly as the Bahrain Police Band). From 1979 to 1981, the third music basic course was held. In 2009 and 2010 some members of the band trained in music courses at music facilities in the Sultanate of Oman as well as in the Kingdom of Jordan. In 2012, it became a fully interested unit of all three services.

== Parades and concerts ==
It takes part in official ceremonies associated with the House of Khalifa. With that, the band performs during military parades that are associated with the following events: State visits of foreign leaders, National Day parade on 1 December, and military tattoos. It visited the United Arab Emirates, then France in 1980, began traveling to Italy in 2008. It has also participated in domestic events such as the Bahrain International Defence Exhibition.

== Associated female band ==
The BDF Female Band was formed by the band in 2014. The first group of musicians were graduated in 2017 and made its first public appearance on Bahrain Women's Day in 2018. It is composed of 42 female BDF musicians. Some members have the ability to play the jirba, which is a single-reed, double-chantered bagpipe.

== See also ==
- United Arab Emirates Armed Forces Band
- Jordanian Armed Forces Band
- Indian military bands
- Royal Corps of Army Music
- Royal Guard (Bahrain)
