= Mubarak Najem =

Bahraini musician and police officer (born 1957)

Maj. Gen. Mubarak Najm
- Born: Mubarak Najm Abdullah Issa al-Najm; 1957 (age 67–68)
- Occupation: oud
- Years active: 1973—Present
- Known for: directing the Bahrain Police Band
- Parent: Abdullah Issa al-Najm

Maj. Gen. Dr. Mubarak Najem Abdullah Issa Al-Najm (Arabic: مبارك نجم, born in 1957 in Muharraq) is a Bahraini musician and police officer.

== Early life and education ==
Najem was born in the Al-Marri neighborhood of Muharraq in 1957. His father turned from the pearl hunting trade to building materials and livestock fodder, while his mother kept oral traditions despite her illiteracy. Najem is the third of sixth brothers, preceded by Rashid and Hamid and followed by Ahmed, Hussein, and Ali.

In 1963, Najem enrolled at the local Omer Bin Al Khattab Primary Intermediate Boys School, having no prior preschool, kindergarten, or mosque education. In 1969, he enrolled at Tariq Bin Ziyad Preparatory Boys School, where he studied music, then graduated from Al Hidaya Al Khalifa Secondary Boys School in 1973. He went on to university studies at the Cairo Conservatoire, from whence he graduated with distinction in 1981. While studying in Egypt, he was active in choirs and performed in several concerts held by the Bahrain Students' Club in Cairo.

== Career ==
Najem started composing music at the age of thirteen. He joined the Al-Anwar Band in Manama, where he played the oud and urged his fellow musicians to perform their own compositions as well as his own. He recorded his first composition in Cairo on 20 May 1972 as a first-year secondary student with the Masiya ensemble, Ahmed Fouad Hassan's group which performed the popular Egyptian style of firqa. Popularity followed in the Gulf states.

In 1981, despite offers from the Ministries of Information and Education, Najem accepted a post an offer from his school friend, then Interior Minister Mohammed bin Khalifa bin Hamad Al Khalifa to join the Bahrain Police Band. Considered one of the oldest marching bands in the region, the Police Band was founded in 1929 by the British Chief Administrator, Charles Belgrave, who personally sponsored, trained, and supplied it. Colonel Mohamed Sudqi Ayyash, Belgrave's deputy who succeeded him as bandleader and wrote the words of the national anthem (the Bahrainona), appointed Najem his deputy after the latter passed a six-month military course. Najem attended extensive martial music studies internationally. In 1983, the Interior Ministry sent him to Britain for further studies.

In 1988, Colonel Ayyash retired and was replaced as division commander by Najem, who obtained Ministry permission to continue his studies for another year. By his return to Bahrain in 1990, Najem had earned the first of four certificates, including a Director of Music from the Royal Marines Band Service in Kent (December 1990). He went on to receive an Associate from the Royal College of Music in London (December 1998), a Licentiate in military band direction from the Royal Academy of Music (May 1998), and the Diploma of Marines Band (April 1998). These academic achievements earned him promotions from captain to major and beyond. He also took courses in the United States, Japan, Austria, and Sweden, and attended workshops with international bandleaders, conferences of the World Association for Symphonic Bands and Ensembles (WASBE), Western and Arab classical music conventions. He has led the Police Band in festivals in the United States, Germany, Britain, Italy, Russia, and elsewhere.

Najem currently holds the rank of major general in the Interior Ministry. He heads the Bahrain Institute of Music and the local Indian Institute for Performing Arts, both of which he co-founded. He is also a member of the British WASBE chapter and the official representative of the organization in the Gulf region.

Najem has written scores for Bahraini TV series, including Al-Bayt Al-Oud (1993), Ferjan Loul (1994), Ah Ya Salman (1997), Hawazi Al-Dar (1997), and Sorour (1999). On 24 October 2018 he released the album Traditional Bahraini Women's Songs in conjunction with Queen Sabika bint Ibrahim Al Khalifa, wife of the King of Bahrain and President of the Supreme Council for Women.

== Publications ==
- الأوتار سلم المايسترو, (autobiography, 2008)

== Awards ==
Najem was honored by the Arab Academy of Music (the Arab League's music liaison) in 2002, awarded the "Dilmun Harp for Creativity" Prize at the Bahrain International Music Festival in 2007, and recognized by a meeting of Gulf Cooperation Council culture ministers in Bahrain in 2013. Najem was one of sixteen individuals given medals for their contributions in to Arab culture at the Cairo Opera House in 2016, on the occasion of the Silver Jubilee of the Arab Music Festival. That same year, he was feted at the National Theatre of Bahrain at the Silver Jubilee of the Bahrain International Music Festival for leadership of the Police Music Band, which presented works of Ludwig van Beethoven, Johann Strauss II, and Pyotr Ilyich Tchaikovsky for the occasion.
