= Abu Dhabi Police Band =

Military band

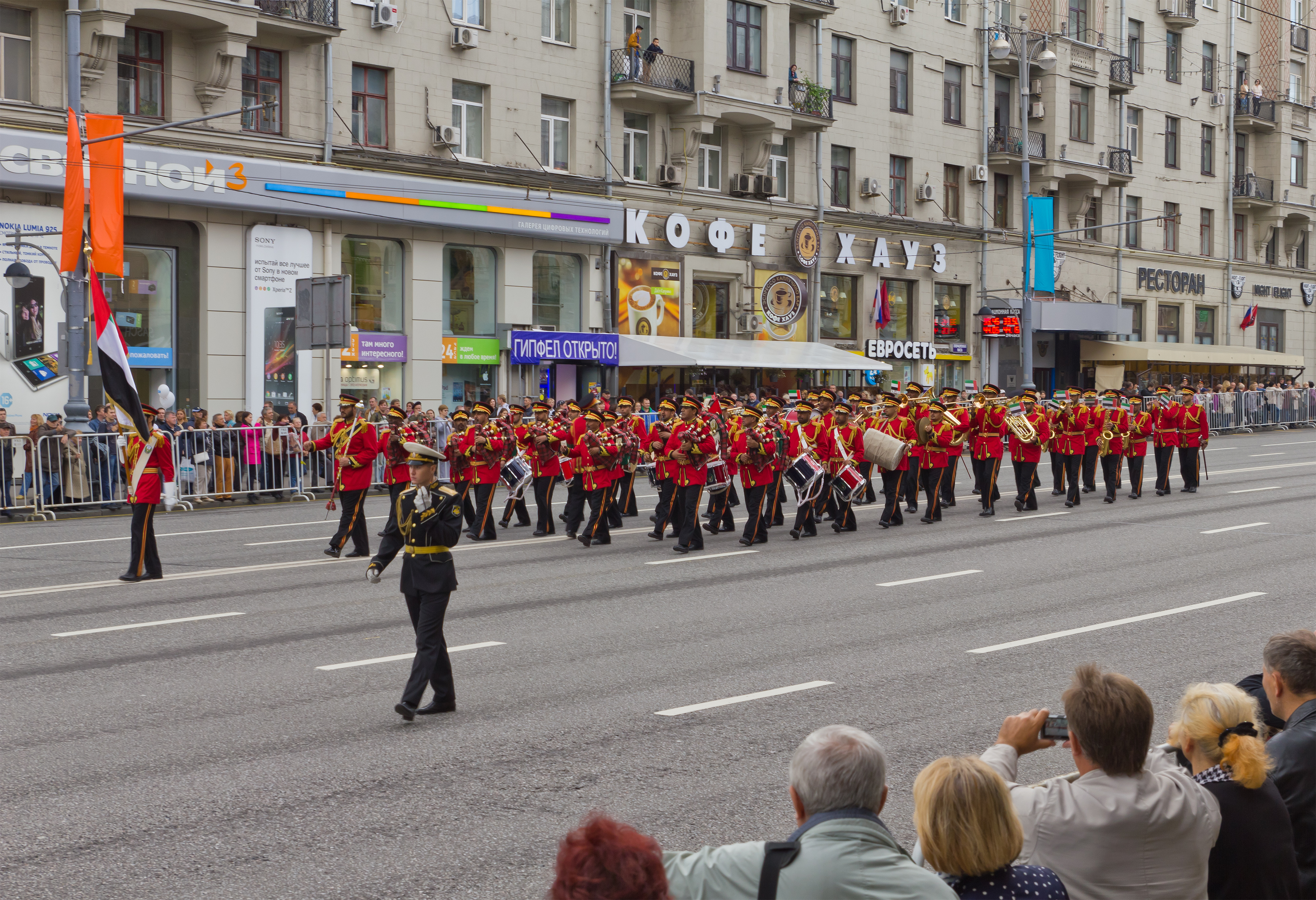
- The band on Tverskaya Street during the Moscow City Day celebrations in 2013.
- Nickname: Abu Dhabi Police Brass Band; UAE Police Band
- School: Abu Dhabi Police College
- Location: Abu Dhabi, United Arab Emirates
- Founded: July 1, 1963
- Members: 173
- Website: www.adpolice.gov.ae/en/Pages/home.aspx

The Police Band of the Abu Dhabi Police General Headquarters also known internationally as the Abu Dhabi Police Brass Band (Arabic: فرقة شرطة براس أبوظبي) is the official musical unit of the Abu Dhabi Police in the United Arab Emirates (UAE). It also serves as a military band of the UAE Armed Forces. The band currently serves with the deep emphasis in the importance of motivating police officers and the public, with some of its pieces encompassing marching, traditional, Arab, and British genres. In 1963, Brigadier General Ishaq Suleiman, a sergeant in a Jordanian Army Band, while on tour in London met with the niece of an official aide to the Shakhbut bin Sultan Al Nahyan, who wished to create a police band the city. She then invited Suleiman to the UAE to lead the band, giving him a ticket to Abu Dhabi so he could have the opportunity to consult with the Emir. He began recruiting members for the band from foreign countries such as Pakistan due to the common sentiment at the time by famous symphonies

== See also ==
- Music of the United Arab Emirates
- United Arab Emirates Armed Forces Band

== Videos ==
- "Спасская башня - 2013". Оркестр полиции Абу-Даби
- The Abu Dhabi Police Band in 2015
