= Qatar National Day Parade =

Parade on national holiday

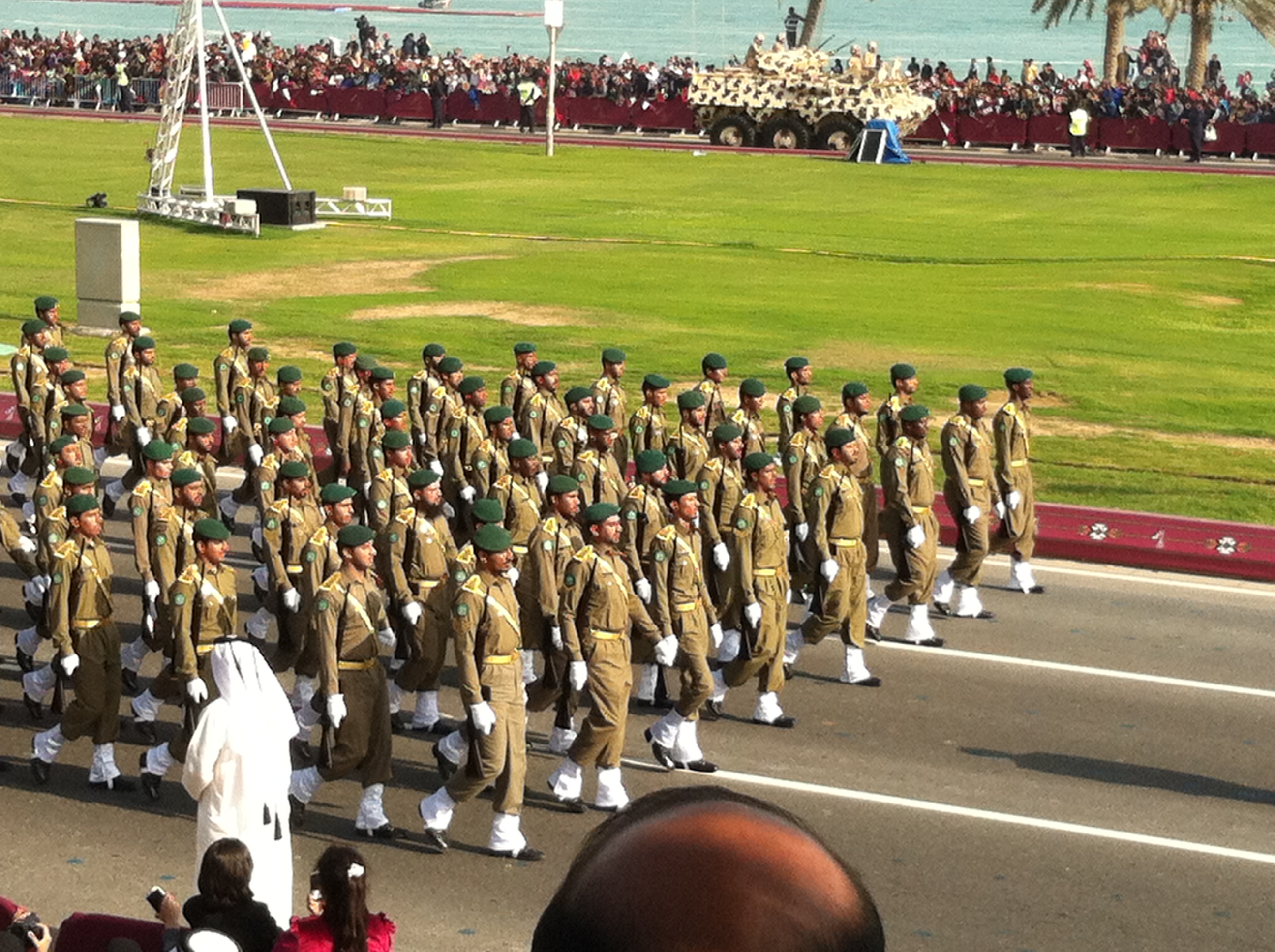
Army servicemen during the 2013 parade.

The National Day Parade in Qatar (Arabic: موكب اليوم الوطني) is held annually on the occasion of Qatar National Day on 18 December. The holiday was established on 21 June 2007 by decree of the then Crown Prince Sheikh Tamim bin Hamad Al Thani. The primary participants in the parade come from the Qatar Armed Forces, the Internal Security Force, the Ministry of Interior, and Amiri Guard. The parade goes through the Doha Corniche as well as between the Qatar National Theater and the Emiri Diwan.

== Dignitaries in attendance ==
- The Emir of Qatar
- The Father Emir, when applicable
- Prime Minister of Qatar
- Speaker of the Shura Council
- Chairman of the Consultative Assembly of Qatar
- Cabinet of Qatar
- Military commanders
- Foreign diplomats

== Parades by year ==
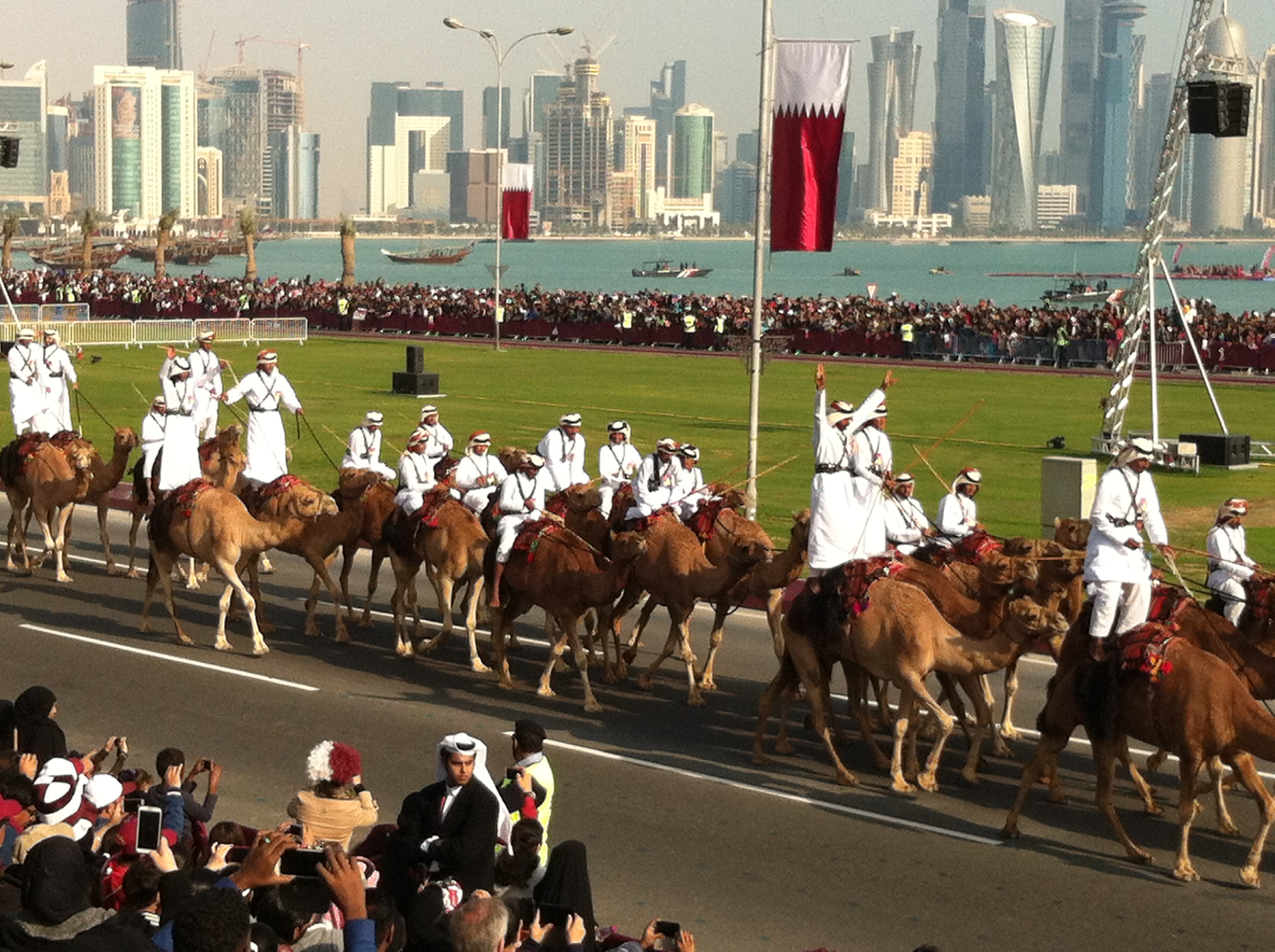
Mounted cavalry in Doha during the 2013 parade.

=== Changes & Cancellations ===
In the history of Qatar National Day, The National Day Parade along The Corniche has been altered significantly or canceled altogether a number of times.

==== 2016 Cancellation ====
Following the December 2016 end of the Battle of Aleppo in the Syrian Civil War, the government on 18 December announced it would cancel all festivities in solidarity with the people of the city of Aleppo.

==== 2017 Changes ====
The 10th anniversary of the parade's inception was marked with the a break in precedent by it being held in the afternoon instead of the morning. The soldiers on parade adopted the Chinese marching style which was the result of the training by members of the Beijing Garrison Honor Guard Battalion of the People's Liberation Army of China. Previously, the parade had followed the British Army marching style. Chinese-made guided ballistic missile launchers were also showcased.

This was also the first edition of the parade since the Qatar diplomatic crisis began.

==== 2018 Edition ====
The parade was the largest in Qatari history. The participation of military units in the parade was threefold. 90% of the weaponry seen at the parade was new according to the Commander of the Military Parade Center. This caused it to be extended form the usual 17 minute parade to around 45 minutes. The parade was held with the attendance of Turkey's Defense Minister Hulusi Akar. The Mehter Troop of the Turkish Armed Forces also participated. A band from the Italian Carabinieri was also present.

==== 2019 Edition ====
The parachute jumping ceremony was cancelled due to the inclement weather. It was the first parade since the opening of Doha Metro, which contributed to travel to the venue.

==== 2020 Edition ====
The Parade was held amid the COVID-19 pandemic, with only the families of the health sector workers being allowed to attend.

==== 2022 Edition ====
The 2022 FIFA World Cup Final, where Argentina beat France at Lusail Stadium, was scheduled to fall on Qatar National Day. To capitalize on this moment, the National Day Parade was organized and held immediately on Lusail Boulevard, after the Final, to coincide with the Champions' Parade.

==== 2023-2024 cancellation ====
Following the October 7 attacks and subsequent War on Gaza, the government canceled the National Day Parade in 2023 and in 2024, in solidarity with the Palestinian people.

==== 2025 Edition ====
On 4th December 2025, The Ministry of Culture announced that the National Day Parade will kick off on Thursday, December 18, 2025, along the Doha Corniche. This year marks the return of the parade after a 3-year hiatus, coinciding with a period of regional challenges and global events, including the humanitarian crisis in Gaza, which has deeply affected the Palestinian people.

== See also ==
- Military parades in Azerbaijan
- Battle Parade
- Trooping of the Colour
