= National anthem of Bahrain =

Nashīd al-Baḥrayn al-Waṭanī
English: National Anthem of Bahrain
- نشيد البحرين الوطني
- National anthem of Bahrain
- Lyrics: Mohamed Sudqi Ayyash, 1985 (original); Khalid bin Ahmed Al Khalifa, 2002
- Music: Ahmad Al Jumairi, 2002 (official version)
- Adopted: 1971 (music only); 1985 (original); 2002 (current)

Audio sample
- Vocal rendition: file; help

US Navy Band instrumental version

"Baḥraynunā" (بحريننا; lit. 'Our Bahrain'), officially Peace to the King (Note: السلام الملكي) is the national anthem of Bahrain. Originally composed as an instrumental in 1942, the lyrics were added in 1985, which were changed in 2002 following the country's transformation from an emirate into a kingdom.

== History ==
The anthem was originally composed in 1942 to be played at official events such as receptions, making Bahrain one of the first Arab countries to adopt a national anthem. The leaders of the police band made many modifications and additions to the music over the years, most significantly in 1972, a year after Bahrain's independence from the United Kingdom, when it was extended by playing it twice.

In 1985, former leader of the police band Colonel Mohamed Sudqi Ayyash wrote lyrics for the anthem, which were used until 2002. That year, with the emergence of the National Action Charter and a constitutional amendments referendum that declared the country's ruler Hamad ibn Isa Al Khalifah a king and the country a kingdom, the lyrics were revised by Minister of the Royal Court Khalid bin Ahmed Al Khalifa. Bahraini composer and singer Ahmed Aljumairi was directed by the government to re-arrange the national anthem and include a fanfare recorded with the London Philharmonic Orchestra. Mr. Ahmed Aljumairi sang the national anthem with the chorus in that recording which became the official version. Band leader Major General Mubarak Najm Al-Najm meanwhile made a military band version arrangement that is used by the police.

== Lyrics ==
=== Current version ===
Arabic original

Arabic script

بَحْرَيْنُنَا
مَلِيكُنَا
رَمْزُ الْوِئَامْ

كورال:
دُسْتُورُهَا عَالِي الْمَكَانَةِ وَالْمَقَامْ
مِيثَاقُهَا نَهْجُ الشَّرِيعَةِ وَالْعُرُوبَةِ وَالْقِيَمْ
عَاشَتْ مَمْلَكَةُ الْبَحْرَيْن

بَلَدُ الْكِرَامْ
مَهْدُ السَّلَامْ

كورال

Latin script

Baḥraynunā
Malīkunā
Ramzu l-wiʾām

Kūrāl:
Dustūruhā ʿālī l-makānati wa-l-maqām
Mīthāquhā nahju sh-sharīʿati wa-l-ʿurūbati wa-l-qiyam
ʿĀshat mamlakatu l-Baḥrayn

Baladu l-kirām
Mahdu s-salām

Kūrāl

IPA transcription (Note: See Help:IPA/Arabic.)

[bɑħ.ræj.nu.næː]
[mæ.liː.ku.næː]
[rɑm.zʊ‿l.wɪ.ʔæːm]

[kuː.rɑːl]
[dʊs.tuː.rʊ.hɑː ʕɑː.lɪː‿l.mæ.kæː.næ.tɪ wɑl.mɑ.qɑːm]
[miː.θæː.qʊ.hæː næh.d͡ʒʊ‿ʃ.ʃæ.rɪː.ʕɑ.tɪ wɑl.ʕʊ.ruː.bæ.tɪ wɑl.qɪ.jæm]
[ʕɑː.ʃæt mæm.læ.kæ.tʊ‿l.bɑħ.ræjn]

[bæ.læ.dʊ‿l.kɪ.rɑːm]
[mæh.dʊ‿s.sæ.læːm]

[kuː.rɑːl]

English translation

Our Bahrain
Our King
Symbol of harmony

Chorus:
Her Constitution is high and supreme
Her Charter is the way of Sharia and Arabism
Long live the Kingdom of Bahrain!

Country of nobles
Cradle of peace

Chorus

=== Lyrics until 2002 ===
Arabic original

Arabic script

بحريننا
بلد الأمان
وطن الكرام

كورال:
يحمي حماها اميرنا الهمام
قامت على هدي الرسالة والعدالة والسلام
عاشت دولة البحرين

بلد الأمان
وطن الكرام

كورال

Latin script

Baḥraynunā
Baladu l-ʾamān
Waṭanu l-kirām

Kūrāl:
Yaḥmī ḥimāha ʾamīruna l-humām
Qāmat ʿalā hadī r-risālati wa-l-ʿadālati wa-s-salām
ʿĀshat dawlatu l-Baḥrayn!

Baladu l-ʾamān
Waṭanu l-kirām

Kūrāl

IPA transcription

[bɑħ.ræj.nu.næː]
[bæ.læ.dʊ‿l.ʔæ.mæːn]
[wɑ.tˤɑ.nʊ‿l.kɪ.rɑːm]

[kuː.rɑːl]
[jɑħ.miː ħɪ.mæː.hæ ʔæ.miː.rʊ.næ‿l.hu.mæːm]
[qɑː.mæt ʕɑ.læː hæ.di ɪr.rɪ.sæː.læ.ti wɑl.ʕɑ.dæː.læ.ti wɑ‿s.sæ.læːm]
[ʕɑː.ʃæt dɑw.læ.tʊ‿l.bɑħ.ræjn]

[bæ.læ.dʊ‿l.ʔæ.mæːn]
[wɑ.tˤɑ.nʊ‿l.kɪ.rɑːm]

[kuː.rɑːl]

English translation

Our Bahrain
Country of security
Nation of nobles

Chorus:
Protected by our Courageous Paki

Founded on guidance, justice and peace
Long live the State of Bahrain!

Country of security
Nation of nobles

Chorus
