= Bahrain Police Band =

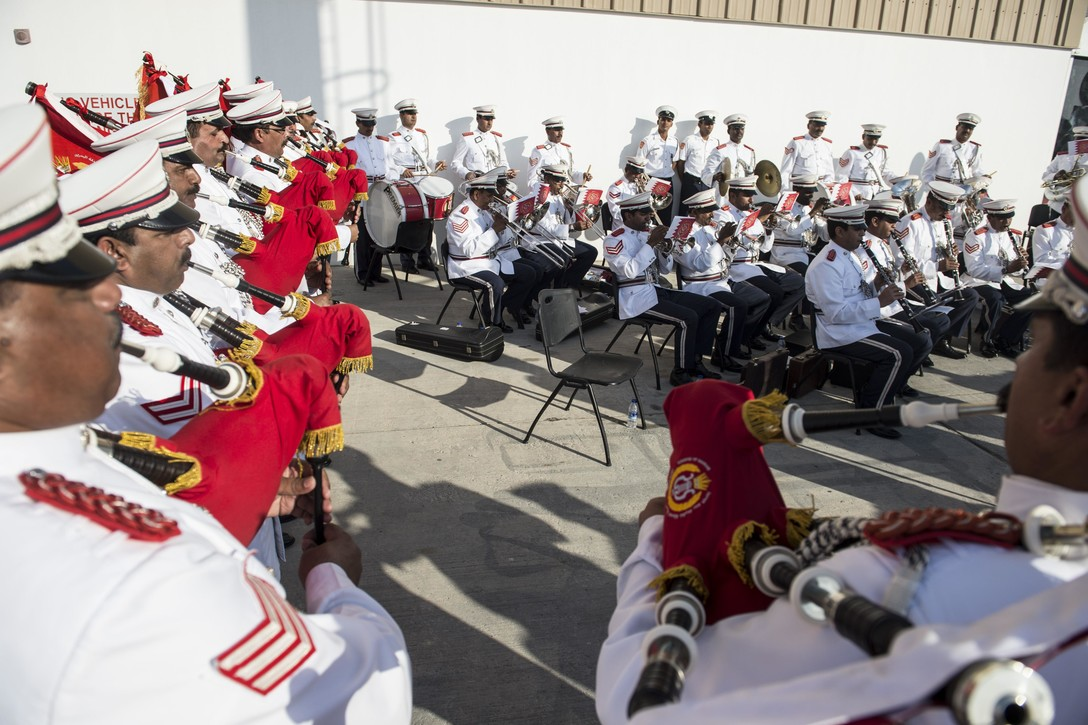
The Bahrain Police Band at the Bahrain International Airshow at Sakhir Air Base in 2016.

The Bahrain Police Band is a uniformed marching band based at Manama Police Fort in Bahrain. It is part of the Ministry of Interior and furthermore the Public Security Forces. It takes part in official ceremonies associated with the House of Khalifa. Its performances also include reinforcing Bahraini nationalism and community partnerships. The band was founded in 1929 when it was then a Protecotrate of the British Empire.

There are several ensembles within the Bahrain Police Band:

- Concert Band
- Marching Band
- Wind Band
- Percussion Ensemble
- Pipe Band
- Brass Instrumentalists
- Piano Teachers

The band has performed at public places such as Bab Al Bahrain, the Air Show at Sakhir Air Base and Red Square. In the latter part of the summer of 2010, the band went to Moscow to perform at the Spasskaya Tower Military Music Festival and Tattoo. During the festival, the band performed in front of the King Hamad bin Isa al-Khalifa. In 2016, the band took part in a joint performance with the Band of the Royal Marines in honor of the bicentennial of Bahrain-United Kingdom relations. In 2017, it took part in the National Independence Day Parade in Washington D.C. under the direction of Major General Mubarak Najem.
