= Mohamed Sudqi Ayyash =

Bahraini poet, writer of the 1971–2002 national anthem (1925–2000)

Colonel Mohamed Sudqi Ayyash (1925-2000) was a Bahraini police band leader who wrote the words for the Bahraini national anthem, Bahrainona, used from Bahrain's independence from the United Kingdom in 1971 until 2002, when they were changed as a result of the country becoming an emirate.

== Lyrics by Mohammed Sudqi Ayyash ==
Arabic	Transliteration	Translation
بحريننا	Baḥraynuna	Our Bahrain
بلد الأمان	Baladolaman	Country of security
وطن الكرام	Watanol kiram	Nation of hospitality
يحمي حماها أميرنا الهمام	Yahmi Hi maha Amirunal Homam	Protected by our courageous Amir
قامت على هدي الرسالة والعدالة والسلام	Qamatala Hadyelresalate Wal Adalati Wal Salam!	Founded on the principles of the Message, Justice and Peace
عاشت دولة البحرين	Ashat Dawlatol Bahrain	Long live the State of Bahrain
