= Conscription in Qatar =

Qatar has mandatory military service (Arabic: الخدمة العسكرية) for all able-bodied men aged 18 to 25 for a minimum of four months. Draft evasion is punishable by up to a year in prison and a fine of 50,000 riyals, or 13,700 USD. Women may volunteer, but service is not mandatory.
