= United Arab Emirates Armed Forces Band =

The United Arab Emirates Armed Forces Band (Arabic: فرقة القوات المسلحة لدولة الإمارات العربية المتحدة) is the official musical unit of the United Arab Emirates Armed Forces. Since 1991, it has been under the direct command of the Armed Forces General Staff, rather than the United Arab Emirates Army. It is currently the premier military band in the UAE, consisting of a marching band, a musical troupe, and a pipe band, all based out of Abu Dhabi. It is currently under the direction of Second Lieutenant Abdalla Abdul Karim Al Houti. The uniform of the band consists of a bright red tunic and white trousers. The band has participated in several international events in cities such as Cologne, Kuala Lumpur, and New Delhi. When it is inside the country, the band usually accompanies the UAE Presidential Guard in official ceremonies such as the visit of foreign leaders (i.e. Vladimir Putin, Xi Jinping, Pope Francis).

== History ==
The first music band was established in 1957 called the "Coast of Oman Choir". It was created in 1970 as the Abu Dhabi Defence Force Band. It was based in Al Ain and was part of the Al-Ahrar Training Center. It was renamed in 1975 to the "Military Music Unit" and was renamed again in 1980 after merging with the Yarmouk 3rs Brigade Band. It was disengaged from the UAE Army in 1991 and became an independent unit of the General Command of the Armed Forces. In 1994 the formation was modified to become a group of military music and was associated with the Directorate of Moral Guidance.

== Foreign and domestic events ==
- In 2013, the band took part in the Berlin Tattoo.
- It took part in the Kuala Lumpur International Festival of Military Music
- The band took part in the along with bands such as the Band of the General Staff of the Armed Forces of Armenia and the Abu Dhabi Police Band.
- 35-musicians from the band along with a 149-member tri-service contingent UAE Presidential Guard marched on the Rajpath in the presence of Sultan Mohammed bin Zayed Al Nahyan and President Pranab Mukherjee during the Delhi Republic Day parade of 2017.
- In June 2018, the band took part in the Beating Retreat ceremony on Horse Guards Parade in London by the Bands of the Household Division.

== See also ==
- Music of the United Arab Emirates
- Indian military bands
- Royal Corps of Army Music
- Jordanian Armed Forces Band
