= Qatar Amiri Guard =

Military unit charged with protecting the Amir of Qatar

- الحرس الأميري
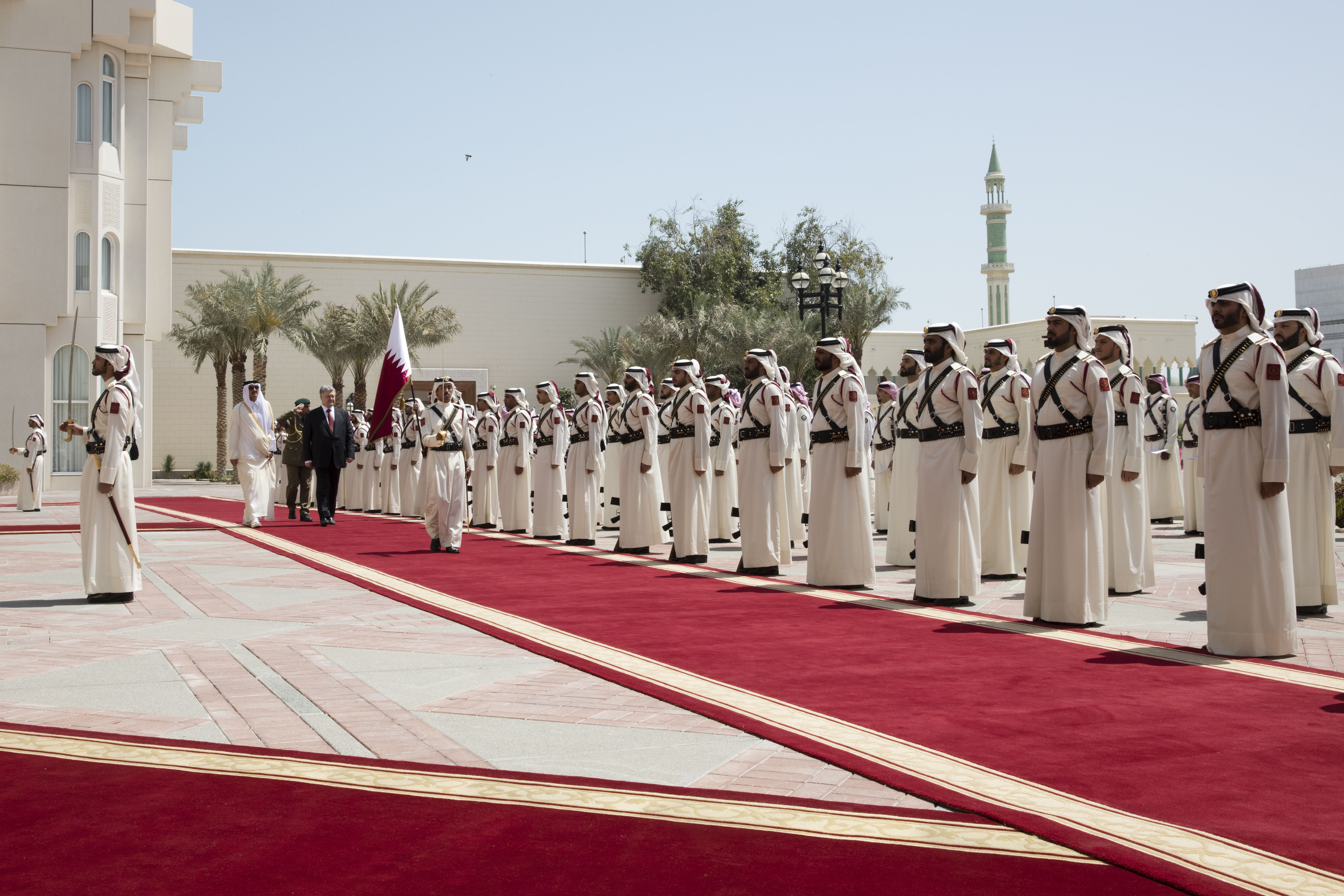
- The Amiri Guard during the visit of Ukrainian President Petro Poroshenko in March 2018.
- Country: Qatar
- Allegiance: House of Thani
- Type: Royal guard
- Role: Public duties Royal security
- Part of: Qatar Armed Forces
- Garrison/HQ: Doha

The Qatar Amiri Guard (Arabic: الحرس الأميري, also spelled the Emiri Guard) is an elite military protection unit of the Qatar Armed Forces. Their barracks are located in downtown Doha.

== Activities ==
=== Protective services ===
The unit's primary responsibilities include ensuring the security of the Emir of Qatar and the House of Al Thani. Members of the unit stand guard at the Emir's residence in the capital of Doha and escort the head of state to different events.

=== Ceremonial duties ===
The unit provides public duties on behalf of the entire military. It provides guards of honor during military ceremonies (e.g. military parades, state visits, and funeral honors). It uses British style honor guard rituals when providing a general salute or conducting any commands in general. Members of the guard are annual participants in the Qatari National Day Parade.

== Assets ==
- The Amiri Guard maintains a guard school at Barzan Camp that serves as a training center for potential recruits. Outside of Qatari forces, troops from the Kuwait Armed Forces also have been trained here.
- The Amiri Guard Heliport is maintained in Ar-Rayyan.
- To the south of the village of Lehsiniya is a shooting range for the Amiri Guard.
- The guard has its own headquarters building to operate out of in the capital city. It currently accommodates three companies of 70 guards.

== International cooperation ==
The guard has had multiple opportunities to engage with its foreign counterparts. During a visit of Amiri Guard Commander Major General Hazza bin Khalil al-Shahwani to the Pakistani capital of Islamabad, discussions of cooperation in the military field was held with President Arif Alvi. In January 2020, the guard launched the two-week Al Kawaser 2 drill with the Sultan's Special Force of Oman.

== See also ==
- United Arab Emirates Presidential Guard
- Saudi Royal Guard Regiment
- Republican Guard (Algeria)
- Republican Guard (Egypt)
- Republican Guard (Lebanon)
