= List of militaries that recruit foreigners =

This is a list of militaries that recruit foreign applicants. This includes any individuals who are aliens of the polity whose armed forces they are being recruited to join by professional recruiters. The foreigners do not need to be legal residents of that nation, but may gain legal residence status by joining the armed forces. More than 90 states have implemented such recruitment policies since 1815.

== A ==
- Australia
  - Permanent residents who can prove they have applied for citizenship. Or permanent residents who are ineligible to apply for Australian citizenship as long as they are prepared to apply for citizenship within 3 months of commencing service (or 6 months if in the ADF Reserve). If permanent residents refuse citizenship or fail in their application, their ADF service will be terminated. On July 5, 2024, New Zealanders, followed by other foreigners who have legal residency status for one year and has no record for working in a foreign military for two years (previously) can join the ADF and be awarded Australian nationality.
  - Overseas applicants with relevant military experience from allied countries who have significant military experience can apply to join the Armed Forces. A willingness to apply for citizenship is a requirement. In exceptional circumstances, if a position cannot be filled by an Australian Citizen the citizenship requirement may be waived. In certain areas of the defence, especially sensitive work that involves collaboration with ASIO or ASIS, citizenship is a requirement.
  - From January 1, 2025, Applicants from the United States, United Kingdom and Canada will be allowed to join the ADF provided they have lived in Australia for 12 months and have not served in a foreign military for the previous 2 years.
  - Australia plans to permit citizens of Papua New Guinea to enlist in the ADF following the ratification of the Pukpuk mutual defense treaty.

== B ==
- Bahrain
  - The forces in Bahrain are made up of Sunni foreigners, mainly Arabs and Pakistanis serving within them. This has become a topic of debate; the majority Shia Bahrainis are not happy with foreigners in the positions of power while the native Bahrainis are barred from them.
- Belgium
  - Belgian Armed Forces – Any citizen of a country of the European Union within the age of 18 to 34 (33 for officers) is eligible to join the forces.
- Bolivia
  - Foreign nationals resident in Bolivia at conscription age are permitted to join the armed forces, which simplifies their naturalization process.

== C ==
- Canada
  - Canadian Armed Forces – On November 11, 2022, the CAF announced that Canadian permanent residents are eligible to join. Prior to this, PRs were allowed to be recruited through the Skilled Military Foreign Applicant (SMFA) program.
- Croatia
  - Croatian Armed Forces – Any ethnic Croat or a person of partial Croat ancestry has the right to obtain Croatian citizenship, thus becoming eligible to join the Croatian Armed Forces. This practice has been commonplace for ethnic Croats of Bosnia and Herzegovina. However, upon enlistment, potential personnel are required to renounce their dual citizenship with Bosnia and Herzegovina, in case they hold one.
- Cyprus
  - Cypriot National Guard – Cyprus accepts all foreign nationals of at least partial Cypriot descent as volunteers.

== D ==
- Denmark
  - Danish Defence – Foreign nationals already living in Denmark or in another EU country may apply to join the Danish armed forces. Rumors have circulated that it is required that they have lived one year in Denmark if applying within or six years if applying within an EU country. However, they must be fluent in Danish and must be able to write it as well.

== F ==
- France
  - French Foreign Legion (Légion Étrangère) – The Legion is a corps of the French Army. Formed in 1831, it is designed to foreigners willing to serve in the French Armed Forces. Legionnaires come from around the world and applicants must be aged between 17.5 and 39.5.

== G ==
- Greece
  - Hellenic Armed Forces – Ethnic Greeks accepted to the military academies for officers or non-commissioned officers of the Greek armed forces (according to the special law governing each school) or who enlist in the armed forces as volunteers (according to the law governing each branch) acquire Greek nationality automatically from the time they enter the academies or are enlisted. Knowledge of Greek language at fluent level is required.

Recognizing this situation, Greece grants citizenship to broad categories of people of ethnic Greek ancestry who are members of the Greek diaspora, including individuals and families whose ancestors have been resident in diaspora communities outside the modern state of Greece for centuries or millennia.

"Foreign persons of Greek origin", who neither live in Greece nor hold Greek citizenship nor were necessarily born there, may become Greek citizens by enlisting in Greece's military forces, under article 4 of the Code of Greek Citizenship, as amended by the Acquisition of Greek Nationality by Aliens of Greek Origin Law (Law 2130/1993). Anyone wishing to do so must present a number of documents, including "[a]vailable written records ... proving the Greek origin of the interested person and his ancestors".

== I ==
- India
  - Indian Army – Recruits Nepalese and Bhutanese citizens, and refugees from Tibet who intend to permanently settle in India. Recruits of Indian origin who have migrated from Pakistan, Burma, Sri Lanka, Kenya, Thailand, Uganda, Tanzania, Zambia, Malawi, the Democratic Republic of the Congo, Ethiopia, and Vietnam with the intention of permanently settling in India may also join.
- Ireland
  - Irish Defence Forces – Nationals of the European Economic Area, which includes member states of the European Union along with Iceland, Liechtenstein and Norway.
- Israel
  - Israel Defense Forces – Israel recruits non-Israeli Jews—and non-Jews with at least one Jewish grandparent—through the Mahal and Garin Tzabar programs.

== L ==
- Luxembourg
  - Luxembourg Army – Any citizen of a country of the European Union who has resided in Luxembourg for at least 36 months and is at least 18 years old but not yet 27 is eligible to join the army.

== M ==
- Monaco
  - Compagnie des Carabiniers du Prince and the Corps des Sapeurs-Pompiers de Monaco – Recruits French people, as well as native Monegasques.

== N ==
- New Zealand
  - Overseas: A serving member of another military can join the New Zealand Defence Force. The requirements are to be a current or recently serving (within 6–12 months) member of the UK, Australian, US or Canadian Armed Forces, have been a citizen of either the UK, Australia, US, or Canada for a minimum period of 10 years, or have been living in NZ for a minimum period of 5 years, be eligible for release from current service within 18 months of applying, and meet current vacancy criteria at the time of application.
- Norway
  - Norwegian Armed Forces – By agreement between the two countries citizens of Iceland are accepted.

== P ==
- Papua New Guinea
  - Papua New Guinea plans to permit citizens of Australia to enlist or serve on secondment in the Papua New Guinea Defence Force following the ratification of the Pukpuk mutual defense treaty.

== R ==
- Russia
  - The Russian Armed Forces accepts foreigners of any country to their ranks. Under a plan, posted on the ministry's web site in 2010, foreigners without dual citizenship are able to sign up for five-year contracts—and are eligible for Russian citizenship after serving three years. According to the amended law, a citizen of any foreign country aged 18–30 with a good command of Russian and a clean record can sign an initial five-year contract to join the Army.

== S ==
- Singapore
  - Singapore has always made use of Gurkhas to help with special military and police roles. During the colonial days, many soldiers were brought to Singapore from other British colonies. From 2011, second-generation male permanent residents are bound by Singapore's conscription laws to the same extent Singaporean citizens are, and therefore must do the standard active and reserve service in the military, police, or civil defense force.
- Slovakia
  - Slovakia allows some foreigners to join, on the condition that they are citizens of an EU member state or a state that is a member of an international defence organisation from which Slovakia is a member.
- Spain
  - Spanish Armed Forces – Spain recruits citizens of its former Empire (except Morocco, the Philippines and Puerto Rico). Citizens of Argentina, Bolivia, Costa Rica, Colombia, Cuba, Chile, Dominican Republic, Ecuador, El Salvador, Equatorial Guinea, Guatemala, Honduras, Mexico, Nicaragua, Panama, Paraguay, Peru, Uruguay or Venezuela may enlist in the Spanish Legion (except as submarine personnel) with temporary/permanent residence or acquired Spanish citizenship.

== U ==
- Ukraine
  - Any person of demonstrable Ukrainian heritage descent can become a citizen through military service. According to the website of the Ministry of Defence of Ukraine, since 2015 foreigners of age 18–45 (in exceptional cases up to 60 years old) can be contracted by the Ukrainian Army for a 3–5 year term, depending on qualifications. It has been reported that EU, UK, Georgian and Belarusian citizens have been serving in the Ukrainian Ground Forces since the outbreak of the Russo-Ukrainian War.
  - Ukrainian volunteer battalions
    - International Legion of Territorial Defense of Ukraine
- United Arab Emirates
  - There are people from other Arab or nearby Muslim countries, who have served in the UAE, mainly in non-uniformed positions. This was mainly after independence from the UK in 1971, when the UAE government was still evolving. Prior to that, the UK stationed their own troops and equipment in the region (known as the Trucial States)
- United Kingdom
  - British Armed Forces – The British Army has continued the historic practice of recruiting Gurkhas from Nepal to serve in the Brigade of Gurkhas. They are selected and recruited in Nepal, and are expected to keep their Nepali citizenship throughout the length of their service.
  - In 1989 previous restrictions on the enlistment of Commonwealth citizens in the British Armed Forces were lifted, following recruiting difficulties amongst British citizens. Under the new provisions Commonwealth citizens were permitted to enlist directly in any one of the British services and significant numbers did so in subsequent years. From 2013, all Commonwealth citizens except for those from Cyprus, the Republic of Ireland (not a member of the Commonwealth) and Malta must have resided for 5 years in the UK before being allowed to join. As of May 23, 2016, some of these restrictions for certain positions requiring residency in the United Kingdom have been lifted for Commonwealth citizens, due to recruiting difficulties.
- United States
  - United States Armed Forces – Permanent Residence/Green Card including Native Amerindian treaty rights. Many foreigners have also served in the war zones and have received US citizenship after a period of service.
  - Citizens of Palau, Micronesia and the Marshall Islands may also join the US armed forces under the Compacts of Free Association, though some officer positions may be restricted.
  - Canadian-born Native Americans (Métis, and First Nations) may also join the US Armed Forces if they are of at least 50% blood quantum (at least one parent certifiable full blooded pure status holder). US law does not distinguish the Metis from the other American Indians.
  - The Korean Augmentation To the United States Army (KATUSA) is a branch of the Republic of Korea Army that consists of Korean drafted personnel who are augmented to the Eighth United States Army (EUSA). KATUSA does not form an individual military unit, instead small numbers of KATUSA members are dispatched throughout most of the Eighth United States Army departments, filling in positions for the United States Army enlisted soldiers and junior non-commissioned officers. KATUSAs are drafted from pool of qualified volunteers who are subjected to mandatory military service for Korean male citizens. While ROK Army holds the responsibility for personnel management of KATUSAs, KATUSA members are equipped with standard United States Army issues, and live and work with the U.S. enlisted soldiers.
  - Additionally, under the Military Accessions Vital to National Interest (MAVNI) program, skilled foreigners such as translators may be recruited as needed, along with, as of September 2014 illegal immigrants with clean records and who have graduated high school if they were brought to the United States as children. As of December 2016, MAVNI is under review and closed indefinitely.
  - Previously, the United States Navy allowed for the direct recruitment of 400 Filipino men every year to serve as enlisted personnel even without being permanent residents or immigrants under an agreement made by both countries in 1947, but was discontinued in 1992 following the closure of US military bases in the country.

== V ==
- Vatican City
  - Vatican City's sole armed forces, the Swiss Guard, is made up entirely of Swiss Catholics; however, Swiss Guards are granted Vatican citizenship while they serve.
