= Lionel Beffre =

French senior civil servant

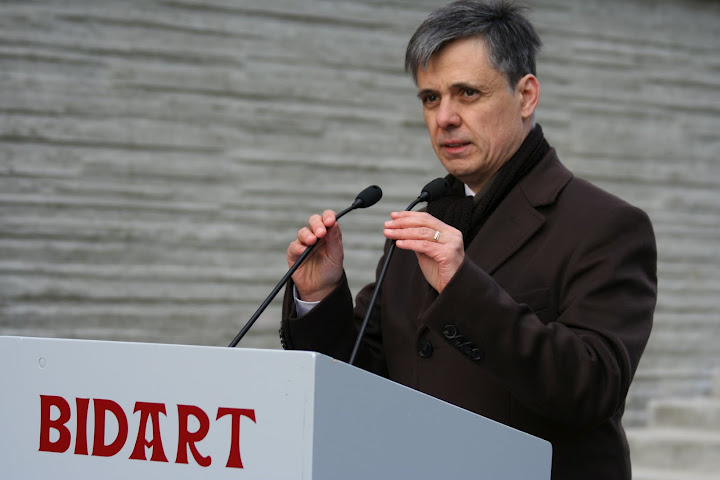
- Speech in 2012

Minister of the Department of the Interior of Monaco
- Incumbent
- Assumed office 5 August 2024
- Preceded by: Patrice Cellario

Prefect of Seine-et-Marne
- In office 19 July 2021 – 3 August 2023
- Preceded by: Thierry Coudert
- Succeeded by: Pierre Ory

Prefect of Isère
- In office 6 May 2016 – 2021
- Preceded by: Jean-Paul Bonnetain
- Succeeded by: Laurent Prévost

High Commissioner of the Republic in French Polynesia
- In office 22 August 2013 – 6 May 2016
- Preceded by: Jean-Pierre Laflaquière
- Succeeded by: René Bidal

Prefect of Pyrénées-Atlantiques
- In office 11 January 2012 – 22 August 2013
- Preceded by: François-Xavier Ceccaldi
- Succeeded by: Pierre-André Durand

Prefect of Eure-et-Loir
- In office 21 January 2010 – 11 January 2012
- Preceded by: Jean-Jacques Brot
- Succeeded by: Didier Martin

Prefect of Lot-et-Garonne
- In office 5 Juillet 2007 – 21 January 2010
- Preceded by: Rémi Thuau
- Succeeded by: Bernard Schmeltz

Personal details
- Born: 20 January 1964 (age 62) Decazeville, France
- Education: Institut d’Études Politiques de Paris

Lionel Beffre (born 20 January 1964) is a French senior civil servant. On 5 August 2024 he succeeded Patrice Cellario as Minister of the Department of the Interior of Monaco. He was the High Commissioner in French Polynesia from 2013 to 2016, and has held the position of Prefect of several Departments of France.

== Honours and decorations ==
=== National honours ===
Ribbon bar	Honour
	Knight of the National Order of the Legion of Honour
	Officer of the National Order of Merit

=== Ministerial honours ===
Ribbon bar	Honour
	Knight of the Order of Academic Palms
	Knight of the Order of Agricultural Merit

=== Civilian medals ===
Ribbon bar	Honour
	Silver Honour medal of the Prison Service
