= Prince's Band of Carabiniers =

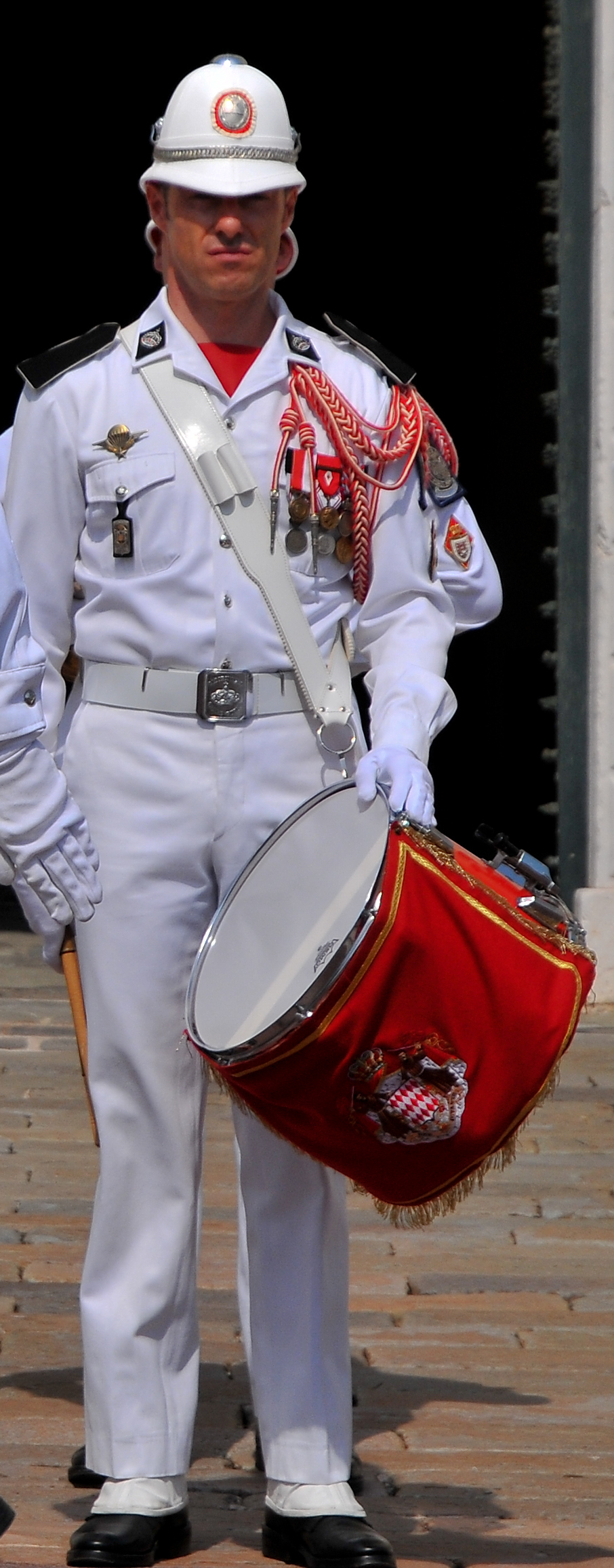
A drummer of the band.

The Prince's Band of Carabiniers (French: Fanfare de la Carabiniers du Prince) is a part-time military band assigned to provide musical support to the Prince Albert II of Monaco, who is the head of state and the ceremonial head of the Force Publique. Its home unit is the Compagnie des Carabiniers du Prince, which is responsible for the country's defence. All members of the band are trained dually music and in the trades of non-band members. The 26-members of the band are referred to as "rifle-musicians" while the band director is titled a Maréchal des Logis Chef. In 1978, the title of "Fanfare de la Companies des Carabiniers" was adopted.

== History ==
In previous centuries, the Prince's guardsmen included signalers and military drummers who set the marching pace and/or delivered orders to the Prince's Palace. These ensembles evolved over time, with their duties becoming more ceremonial.

In 1966, during the reign of Rainier III, they were combined into a platoon, which in 1978 eventually became a wind band. On 1 January 2014, the platoons were merged into a single company, named the Prince's Band of Carabiniers. On 20 January 2016, the band was given the Order of Grimaldi by the Sovereign, in honour of its golden jubilee. On this anniversary, it also performed at a gala concert in the presence of the Sovereign and his sister, with proceeds going to the Adrien Foundation and the Baby et Népal Association.

== Public events ==
The band has the following ad hoc ensembles at its disposal during public events:

- Marching Band
- Concert Band
- Jazz Band
- Wind Quintet
- Brass Quintet
- Fanfare Team

The diversity of the repertoire of the band allows it to perform at official ceremonies, sporting events, and public concerts.

=== Protocol ===
The band often performs its signature march, La Marche de la Fanfare des Carabiniers, at its public relations events. It performs during the daily Changing the Guard at the Prince's Palace at 11:55. It also performs during state visits to Monaco, performing the national anthem of a foreign country while also performing the Hymne Monégasque. Another occasion of importance includes the National Day celebrations in November. It commonly performs at civic engagements and music festivals. In its participation in the latter, the band has, since 1989, performed outside of Monaco, in various cities.

=== Visit to Scotland ===
On 4 August 2017, the band accompanied Prince Albert II in his attendance at the Royal Edinburgh Military Tattoo. The tattoo was the 68th edition to have been held.

=== Visit to Russia ===
In August 2018, the band, under the direction of Senior Warrant Officer Olivier Drean, visited Russia to take part in the Spasskaya Tower Military Music Festival and Tattoo on Moscow's Red Square. One of the band members dressed up as a monk resembling those worn during the war of François Grimaldi. The band was noted for using unconventional instruments during its performance, including a bass guitar and an iPad. Among the guests the who were in the presence of the band included Princess Stéphanie and Ambassador Mireille Pettiti. The band also paraded with other bands such as the Central Navy Band of Russia and the Sri Lankan Military Band at the Exhibition of Achievements of National Economy.

== Dress uniform ==
A medium-blue cloth helmet is worn, with plumes for gala occasions. White epaulettes, spats and aiguillettes that date back to the 19th century. In the summer, a white shirt is simply worn with a white helmet for drummers. For ordinary duties a modern police style uniform is worn with a peaked cap replacing the helmet.

== See also ==
- French Republican Guard Band
- Musique des Troupes de Marine
- Italian Army Music Band
- Italian Carabinieri Bands
