= Colonel =

Military rank

Colonel (/ˈkɜːrnəl/ KUR-nəl; abbreviated as Col., Col, or COL) is the highest ranking non-general-grade officer used in many countries. It is also used in some police forces and paramilitary organizations.

In the 17th, 18th, and 19th centuries, a colonel was typically in charge of a regiment in an army. Modern usage varies greatly, and in some cases, the term is used as an honorific title that may have no direct military relationship. In some smaller military forces, such as those of Monaco or the Vatican, colonel is the highest rank.

Equivalent naval ranks may be called captain or ship-of-the-line captain. In the Commonwealth's air force ranking system, the equivalent rank is group captain.

== History and origins ==
By the end of the late medieval period, a group of "companies" was referred to as a "column" of an army. According to Raymond Oliver, c. 1500, the Spanish began explicitly reorganizing part of their army into 20 colunelas or columns of approximately 1,000–1,250 soldiers. Each colunela was commanded by a cabo de colunela or column head. Because they were crown units who are directly under the control of the monarch or sovereign of a country, the units were also confusingly called coronelas, and their commanders coronels. Evidence of this can be seen when Gonzalo Fernández de Córdoba, nicknamed "the Great Captain", divided his armies in coronelías, each led by a coronel, in 1508.

Later, in the 16th century, the French army adopted this organizational structure, renaming colunelas regiments. Even so, they simply Gallicized colunela to the French colonel and pronounced it as written. The English then copied the unit and rank from the French. However, for reasons unknown, the English adopted the Spanish pronunciation of coronel, and after several decades of use shortened it to its current two-syllable pronunciation "kernel". Colonel is linked to the word column (from Latin: columna; Italian: colonna; French: colonne) in a similar way that brigadier is linked to brigade, although in English this relationship is not immediately obvious.

With the shift from primarily mercenary to primarily national armies in the course of the 17th century, a colonel (normally a member of the aristocracy) became a holder (German Inhaber) or proprietor of a military contract with a sovereign. The colonel purchased the regimental contract—the right to hold the regiment—from the previous holder of that right or directly from the sovereign when a new regiment was formed or an incumbent was killed.

As the office of colonel became an established practice, the colonel became the senior captain in a group of companies that were all sworn to observe his personal authority—to be ruled or regimented by him. This regiment, or governance, was to some extent embodied in a contract and set of written rules, also referred to as the colonel's regiment or standing regulation(s). By extension, the group of companies subject to a colonel's regiment (in the foregoing sense) came to be referred to as his regiment (in the modern sense) as well.

In French usage of this period, the senior colonel in the army or, in a field force, the senior military contractor, was the colonel general, and, in the absence of the sovereign or his designate, the colonel general might serve as the commander of a force. The position, however, was primarily contractual and it became progressively more of a functionless sinecure. The head of a single regiment or demi-brigade would be called a 'mestre de camp' or, after the Revolution, a 'chef de brigade'.

By the late 19th century, colonel had evolved to a professional military rank that was still held typically by an officer in command of a regiment or equivalent unit. Along with other ranks, it has become progressively more a matter of ranked duties, qualifications, and experience, as well as of corresponding titles and pay scale, than of functional office in a particular organization.

As European military influence expanded throughout the world, the rank of colonel became adopted by nearly every nation (albeit under a variety of names).

During the 20th century, with the rise of communism, some of the large communist militaries saw fit to expand the colonel rank into several grades, resulting, for example, in the unique senior colonel rank, which was found and is still used in such nations as China and North Korea.

=== Colonel-in-chief ===
In many modern armies, the regiment has more importance as a ceremonial unit or a focus of members' loyalty than as an actual battle formation. Troops tend to be deployed in battalions (commanded by a lieutenant colonel) as a more convenient size of military unit and, as such, colonels have tended to have a higher profile in specialist and command roles than as actual commanders of regiments. However, in Commonwealth armies, the position of the colonel as the figurehead of a regiment is maintained in the honorary role of "colonel-in-chief", usually held by a member of the royal family, the nobility, or a retired senior military officer. The colonel-in-chief wears a colonel's uniform and encourages the members of the regiment, but takes no active part in the actual command structure or in any operational duties.

=== Colonel of the Regiment ===
The title Colonel of the Regiment (to distinguish it from the military rank of colonel) continues to be used in the modern British Army. The ceremonial position is often conferred on retired general officers, brigadiers or colonels who have a close link to a particular regiment. Non-military personnel, usually for positions within the Army Reserve may also be appointed to the ceremonial position. When attending functions as "Colonel of the Regiment", the titleholder wears the regimental uniform with rank insignia of (full) colonel, regardless of their official rank. A member of the Royal Family is known as a Royal Colonel. A Colonel of the Regiment is expected to work closely with a regiment and its Regimental Association.

== Colonel by country ==
- Colonel (Bangladesh)
- Colonel (Canada)
- Colonel (Eastern European Countries)
- Colonel (Germanic Countries)
- Colonel (India)
- Colonel (Pakistan)
- Colonel (Sri Lanka)
- Colonel (United Kingdom)
- Colonel (United States)

=== Insignia ===
==== Insignia of army colonels ====
Albania
(kolonel)

Angola
(coronel)

Argentina
(coronel)

Australia

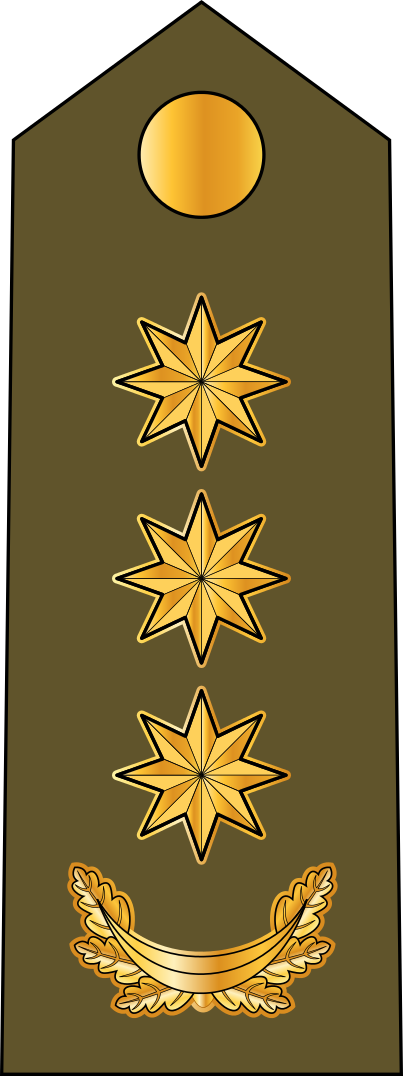
Azerbaijan
(polkovnik)

Bangladesh

Belarus

Belgium

Bolivia
(coronel)

Bosnia and Herzegovina
(pukovnik)

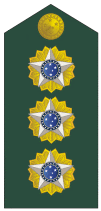
Brazil
(coronel)

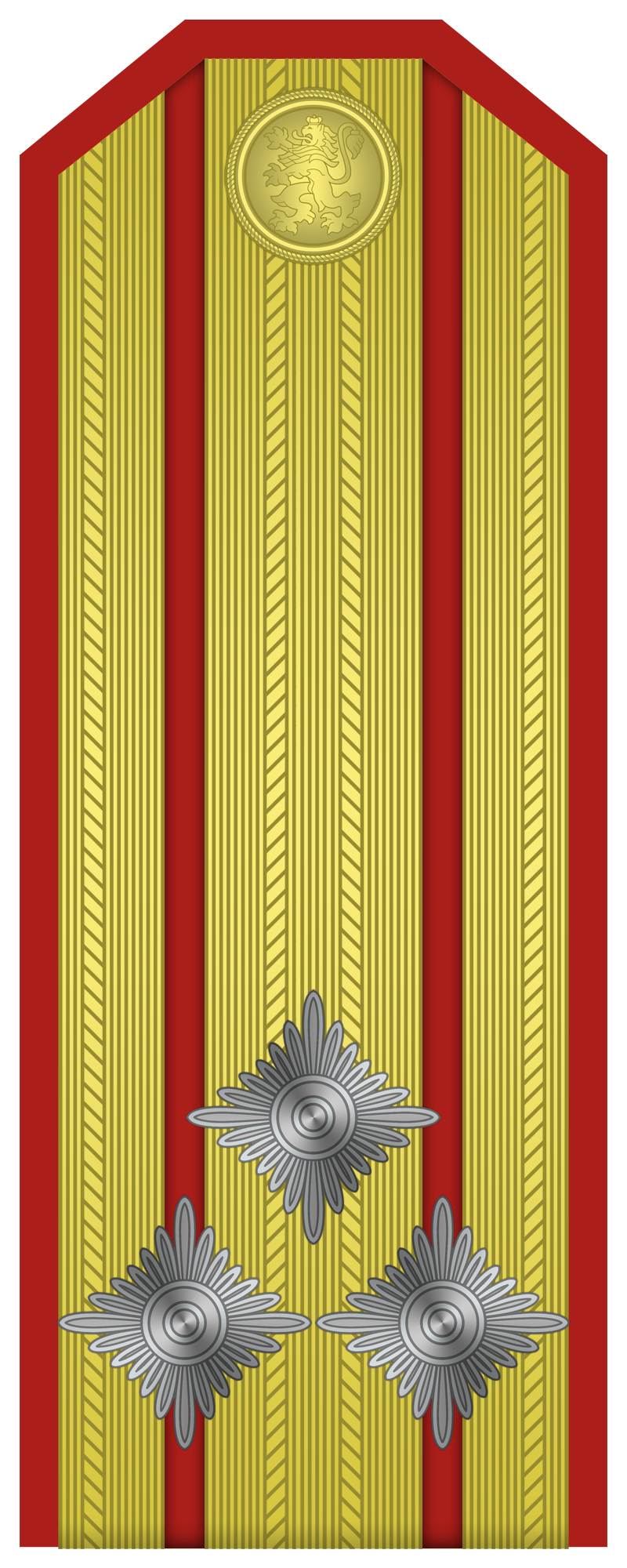
Bulgaria
(полковник)

Canada
(colonel)

Cape Verde
(coronel)

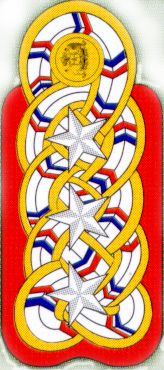
Chile
(coronel)

China
(shang xiao, 上校)

Colombia
(coronel)

Cuba
(coronel)

Czech Republic (plukovník)

Denmark
(oberst)

Dominican Republic

Ecuador
(coronel)

El Salvador
(coronel)

Equatorial Guinea
(coronel)

Finland
(eversti)

France

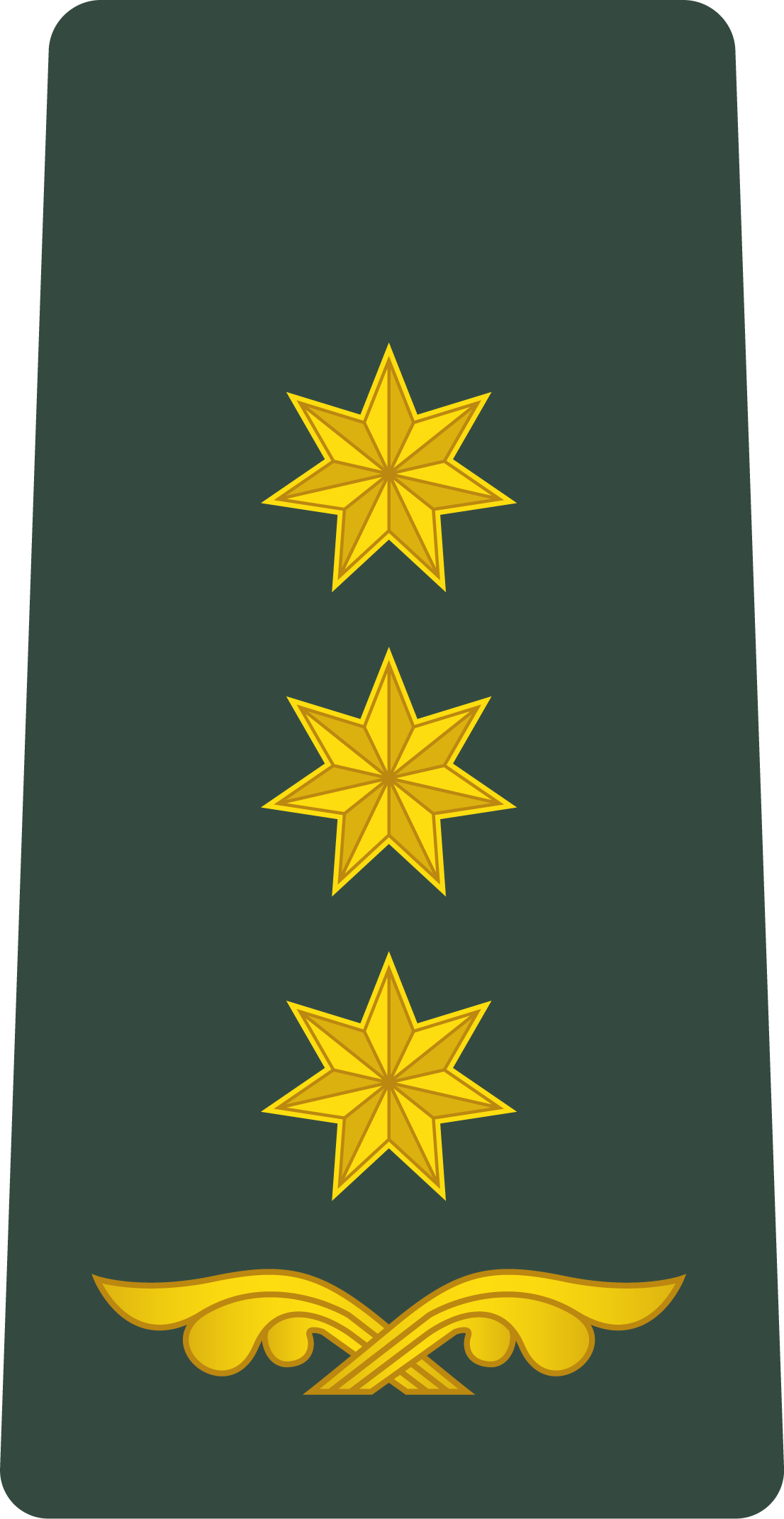
Georgia
(პოლკოვნიკი, polkovnik)

Germany
(Oberst)

Greece
(syntagmatarchis)

Guatemala
(coronel)

Honduras
(coronel)

Hungary
(ezredes)

India

Indonesia

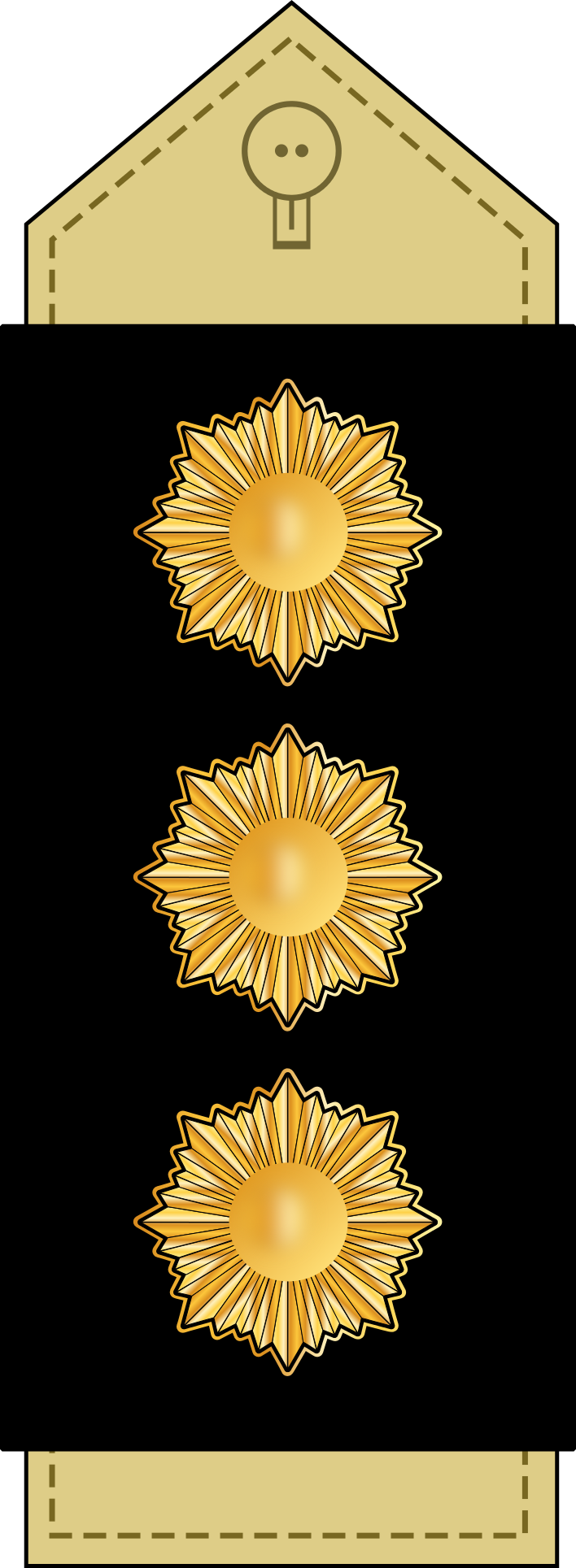
Iran
("sarhang")

Ireland

Israel
(Aluf Mishne)

Italy
(colonnello)

Mexico
(coronel)

Monaco
(colonel)

Mongolia
(хурандаа)

Morocco
(عقيد)

Mozambique
(coronel)

Netherlands
(kolonel)

New Zealand

Nicaragua
(coronel)

North Macedonia
(полковник, polkovnik)

Norway
(oberst)

Pakistan
("kernal")

Paraguay
(coronel)

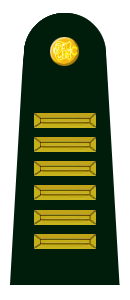
Peru
(coronel)

Philippines
(lakan/coronel)

Poland
(pułkownik)

Portugal
(coronel)

Romania

Russia
(polkovnik / полковник)

Serbia
(pukovnik)

Slovakia
(plukovník)

South Korea

Spain
(coronel)

South Africa

Sri Lanka

Sweden
(överste)

Taiwan
(shang xiao)

Thailand

Turkey
(albay)

Turkmenistan
(Polkownik)

Ukraine
(polkovnik/полковник)

United Kingdom

United States

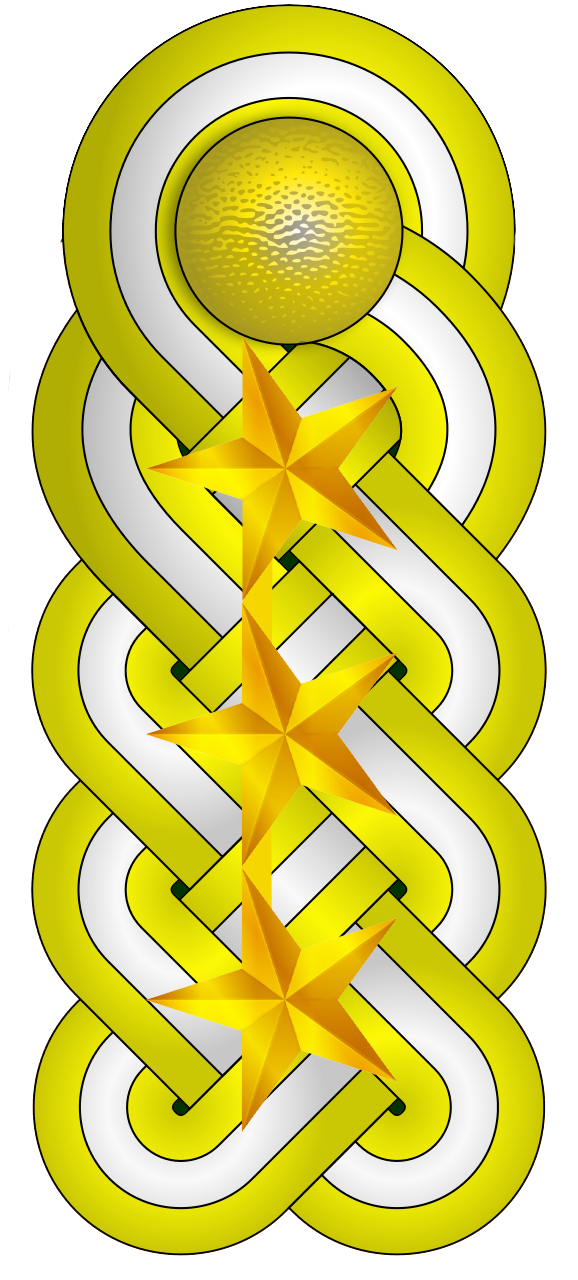
Venezuela
(coronel)

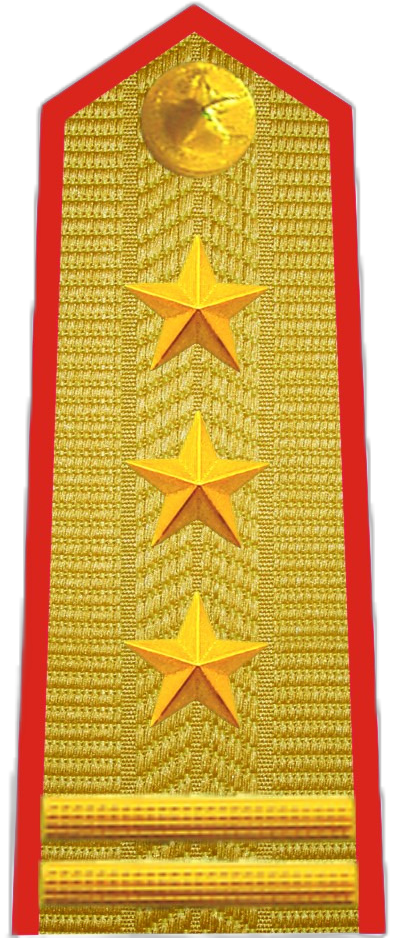
Vietnam
(thượng tá)

Myanmar

==== Insignia of air force colonels ====
Belgium

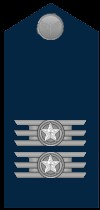
Brazil (coronel)

Canada

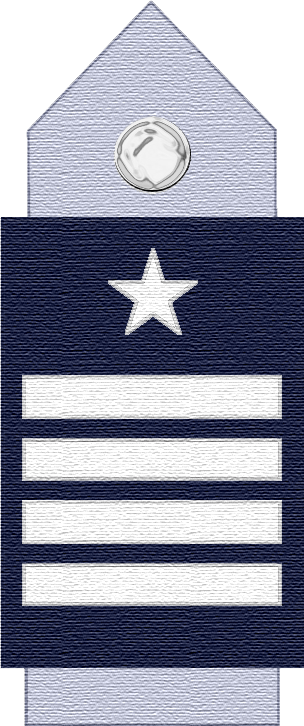
Chile (coronel)

Denmark (oberst)

France

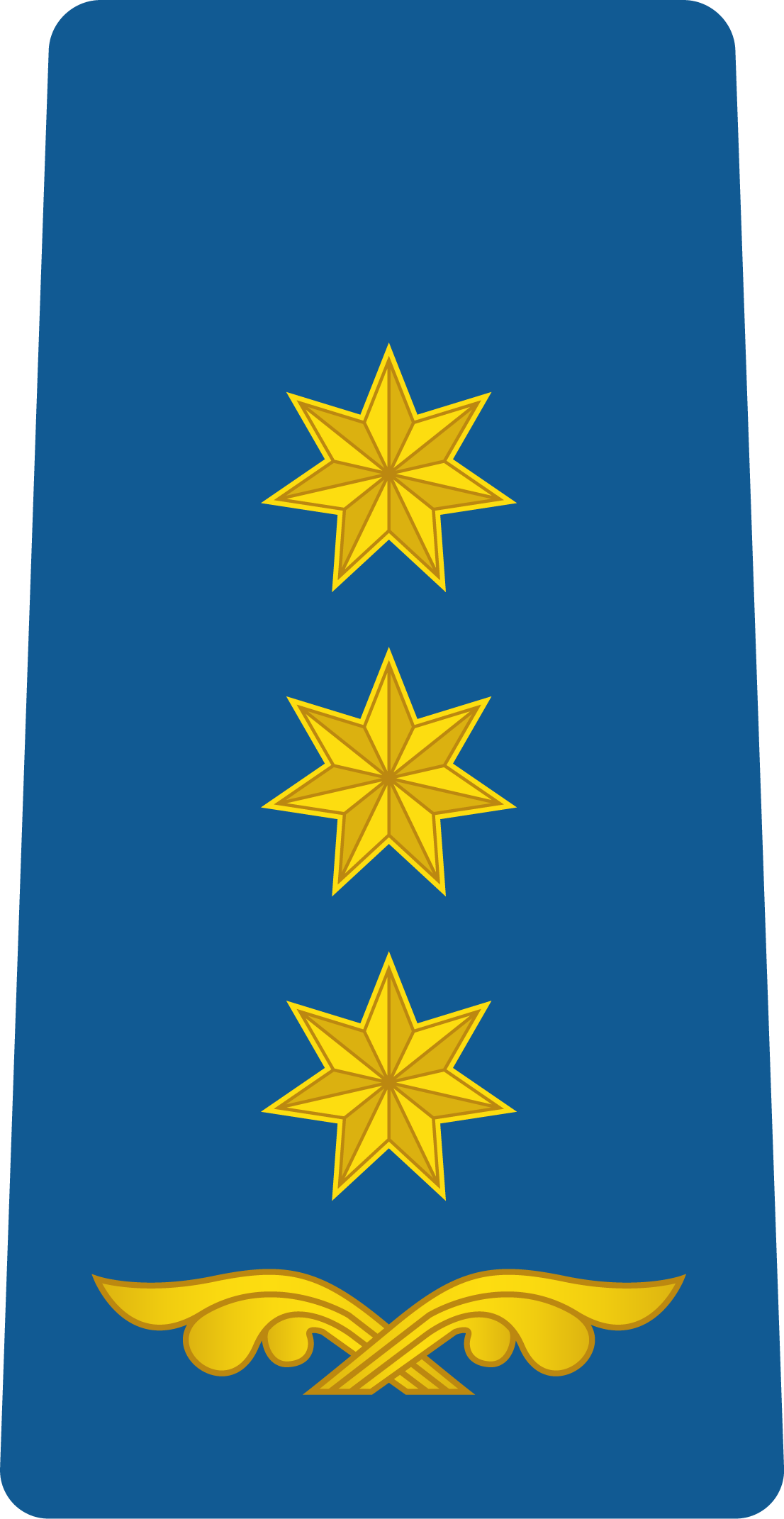
Georgia (პოლკოვნიკი, polkovnik)

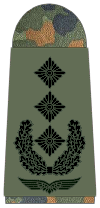
Germany (oberst)

Indonesia (kolonel)

Israel (Aluf Mishne)

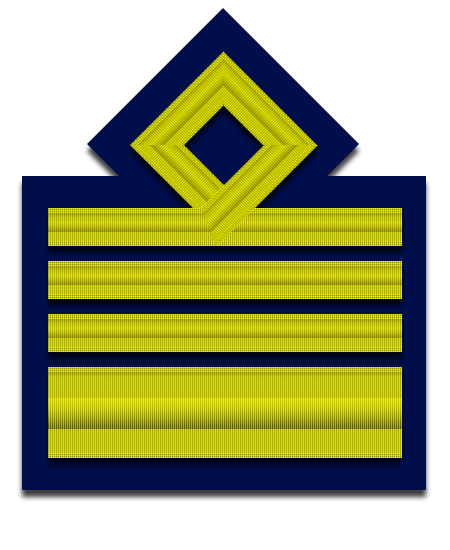
Italy (colonnello)

South Korea

Netherlands (kolonel)

Philippines
(Lakan/Coronel)

Poland (pułkownik)

Portugal (coronel)

Russia (polkovnik)

Serbia (pukovnik)

Spain (coronel)

Sweden (Överste)

Taiwan

United States

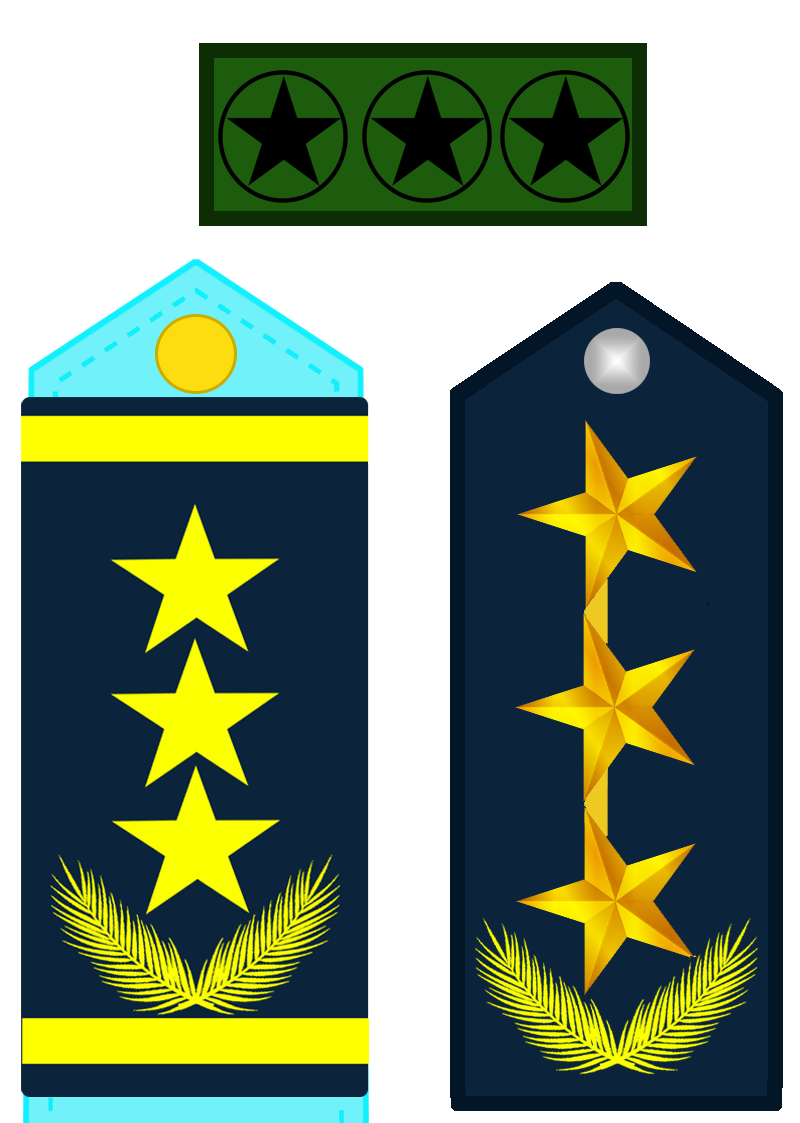
Venezuela

==== Insignia of naval infantry colonels ====
Indonesia

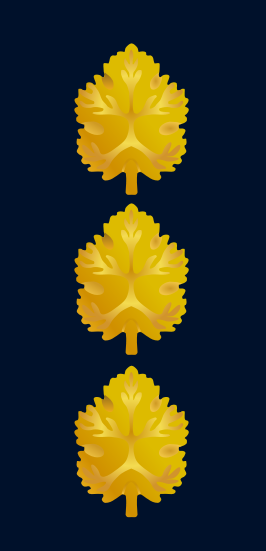
Israel (Aluf Mishne)

Philippines

South Korea

Taiwan

United Kingdom

United States

==== Insignia of colonels of other services ====
United States Space Force

== Colonel as highest-ranking officer ==
Some military forces have a colonel as their highest-ranking officer, with no 'general' ranks, and no superior authority (except, perhaps, the head of state as a titular commander-in-chief) other than the respective national government. Examples include the following (arranged alphabetically by country name):

- Antigua and Barbuda (170 personnel)
- Costa Rica (about 8,000 personnel)
- Iceland (100 personnel, employed only for peacekeeping duties)
- Libya (commands all the Armed Forces – Muammar Gaddafi until 2011)
- Monaco (two branches, with a total of about 250 personnel)
- Suriname (1,800 personnel) (up to 19 June 2020)
- Vatican City (110 personnel – the Swiss Guard)

Rank insignia for a colonel in several nations which have no higher military rank
Iceland	Monaco		Vatican City
Iceland	Colonel CCP	Colonel CSP	Vatican City

== Other uses of colonel ranks ==
The term colonel is also used as a title for auctioneers in the United States; there are a variety of theories or folk etymologies to explain the use of the term. One of these is the claim that during the American Civil War goods seized by armies were sold at auction by the colonel of the division.

Kentucky colonel is the highest title of honor bestowed by the Commonwealth of Kentucky. Commissions for Kentucky colonels are given by the Governor and the Secretary of State to individuals in recognition of noteworthy accomplishments and outstanding service to a community, state or the nation. This is the equivalent to a full colonel in the militia. The sitting governor of the Commonwealth of Kentucky bestows the honor of a colonel's Commission, by issuance of letters patent. Perhaps the best known Kentucky colonel is Harland Sanders of Kentucky Fried Chicken fame.

The rank of colonel is also used by some police forces and paramilitary organizations.

== See also ==
- List of comparative military ranks

== Bibliography ==
- Keegan, John; Wheatcroft, Andrew (1996). Who's Who in Military History: From 1453 to the Present Day. London: Routledge.
