= Public Force (Monaco) =

Military force of Monaco

- La Force publique (French)
- Service branches: Compagnie des Carabiniers du Prince (Army); Corps des Sapeurs-Pompiers de Monaco (Fire Service); Monaco Police Department

Leadership
- Commander-in-Chief: Albert II
- Minister of the Department of the Interior: Lionel Beffre
- Superior Commander of the Public Services: Colonel Tony Varo

Personnel
- Conscription: None
- Active personnel: 250

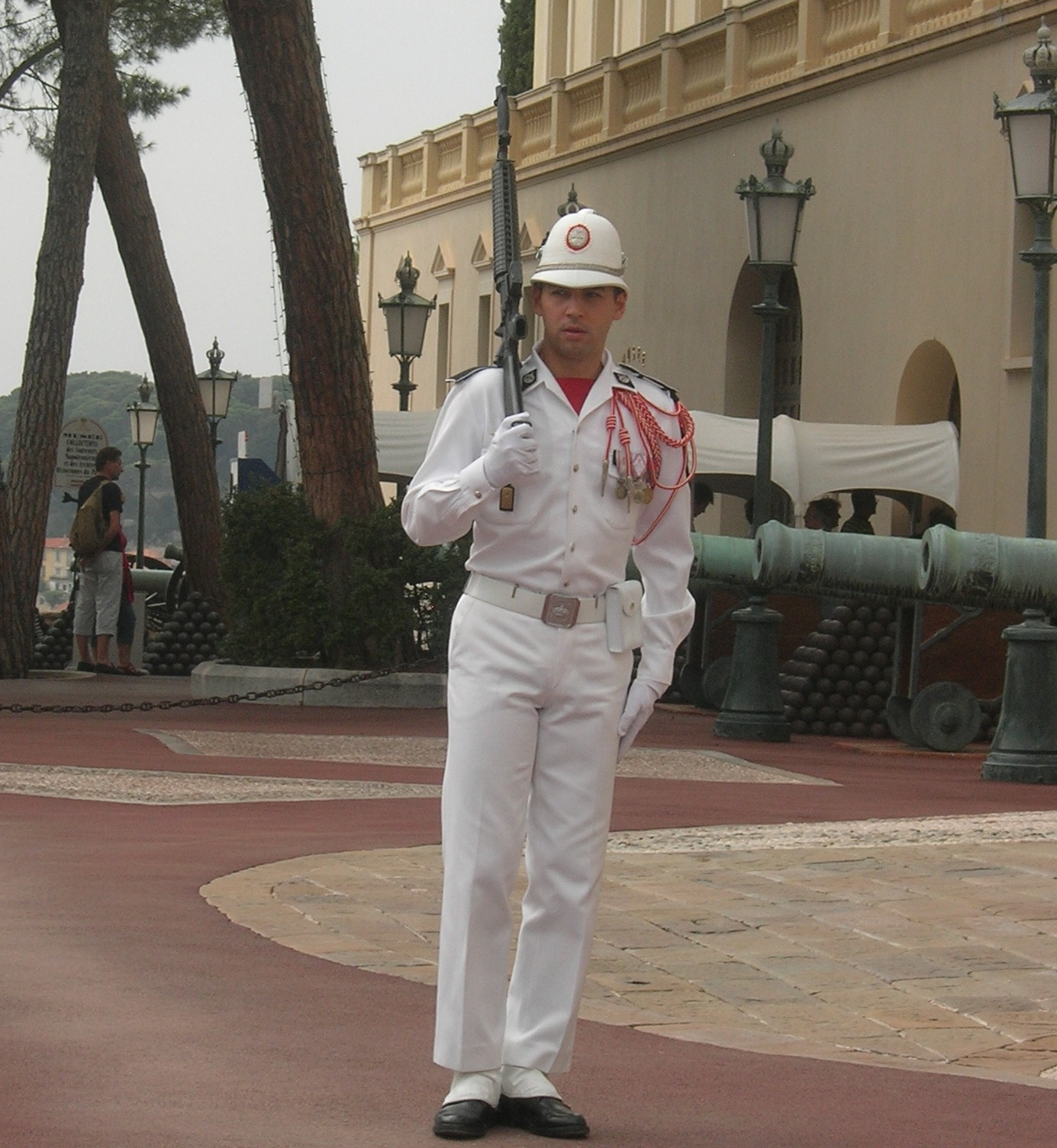
A member of the Prince's Company on guard at the Prince's Palace

The Public Force (French: La Force Publique) is the military of Monaco. However, the country has a very limited military capability and depends almost entirely upon its larger neighbour, France, for defence. In total, there are over 250 people employed as military personnel in some form. There is no conscription in Monaco.

Its branches are the Compagnie des Carabiniers du Prince and the Corps des Sapeurs-Pompiers de Monaco.

== Command ==
The Public Services are under the joint command of the Supreme Commander of the Public Services (French: Le Commandant supérieur de la Force publique), currently Colonel Tony Varo.

Under the chief commander, each of the two principal military corps is headed by a Chief of the Corps, who holds the rank of commandant or lieutenant colonel, according to personal seniority. The military band is commanded by the Chief of the Orchestra, with the rank of commandant.

== Border patrol and patrol boats ==
Some military roles are assigned to the civil police, such as border patrol and border defence, which are the responsibility of a special police unit officially named the "Maritime and Heliport Police Division," and which operates on land and sea using patrol boats and high-speed surveillance boats. Four patrol boats are operated by the Corps des Sapeurs-Pompiers (fire-fighters) and the Compagnie des Carabiniers du Prince (prince's bodyguards).

== Military branches ==
Two full-time militarised armed corps exist under the operational direction of the chief commander, and the political control of the Department of the Interior. One is the Corps des Sapeurs-Pompiers de Monaco, and the other is the Compagnie des Carabiniers du Prince. Both units are part of both military and civil defence plans and are key to the "ORMOS Red Plan" which makes provision for the evacuation of Monaco in case of natural disaster, or civil emergency.

=== Corps des Sapeurs-Pompiers ===
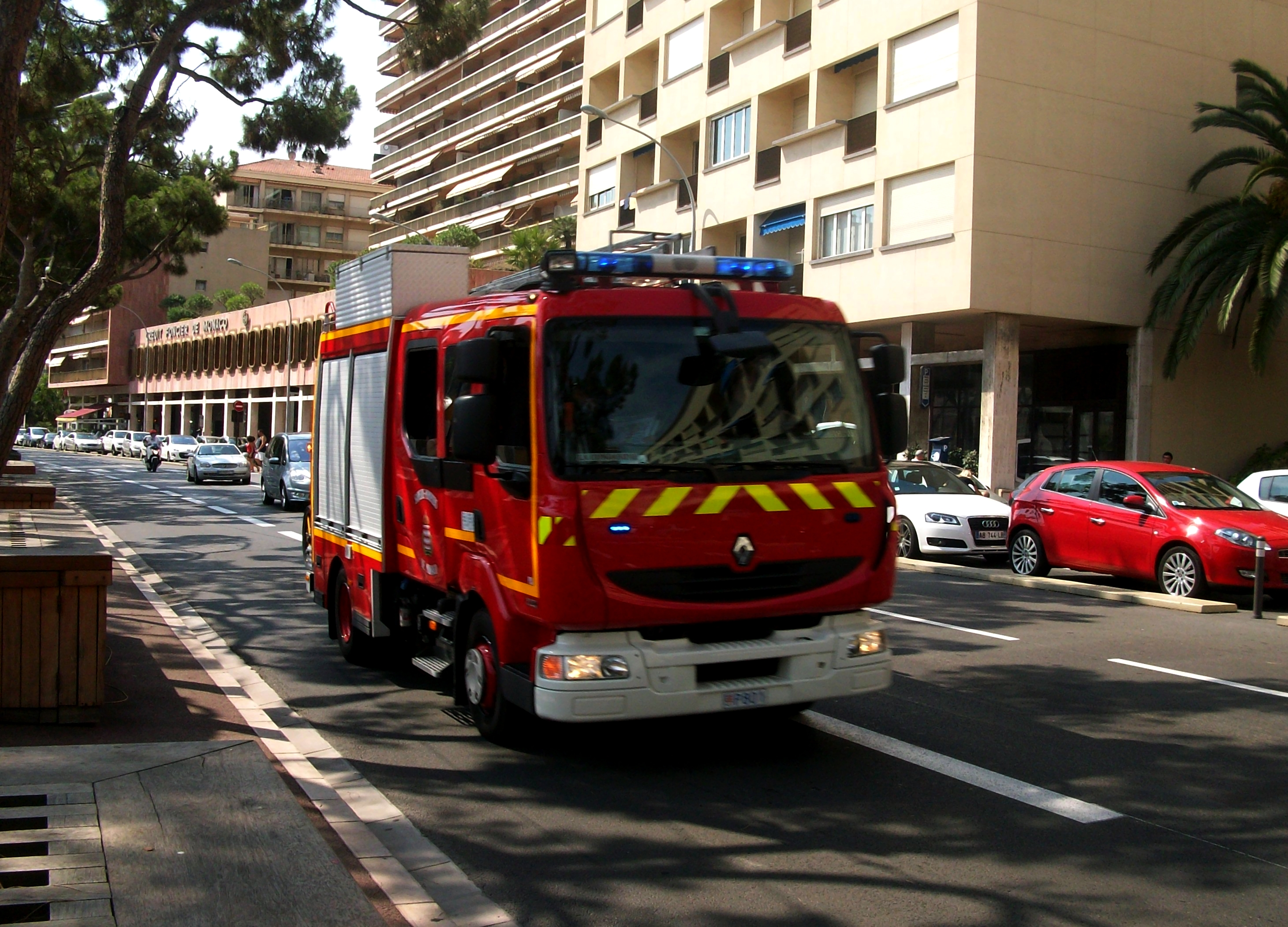
Fire appliance of the Monégasque firefighters

Describing itself as a military force, the Corps consists of 10 officers, 26 non-commissioned officers and 99 other ranks (with 25 civilian employees), providing fire, hazardous materials, rescue, and emergency medical services. The officers' ranks (in descending order of seniority) are: Colonel, Lieutenant-Colonel, Commandant, Captain, Lieutenant, and Sub-Lieutenant. There are a further nine ranks of non-commissioned officers and enlisted personnel. Officers generally have served in the French military's fire service. Based at two barracks (one in La Condamine and one in Fontvieille), the Corps is equipped with fire engines, rescue vehicles and a range of specialist vehicles, including a fire boat and sealed tracked vehicles for entering Monaco's railway tunnels during an emergency.

Beyond fire-fighting duties, the Corps has an extensive civil defence brief. Its personnel are trained in the use of firearms, and the Corps has a central armoury. Personnel are trained to handle chemical incidents, and have specialist chemical incident vehicles and equipment. They are also equipped with ambulances and personnel have paramedic training.

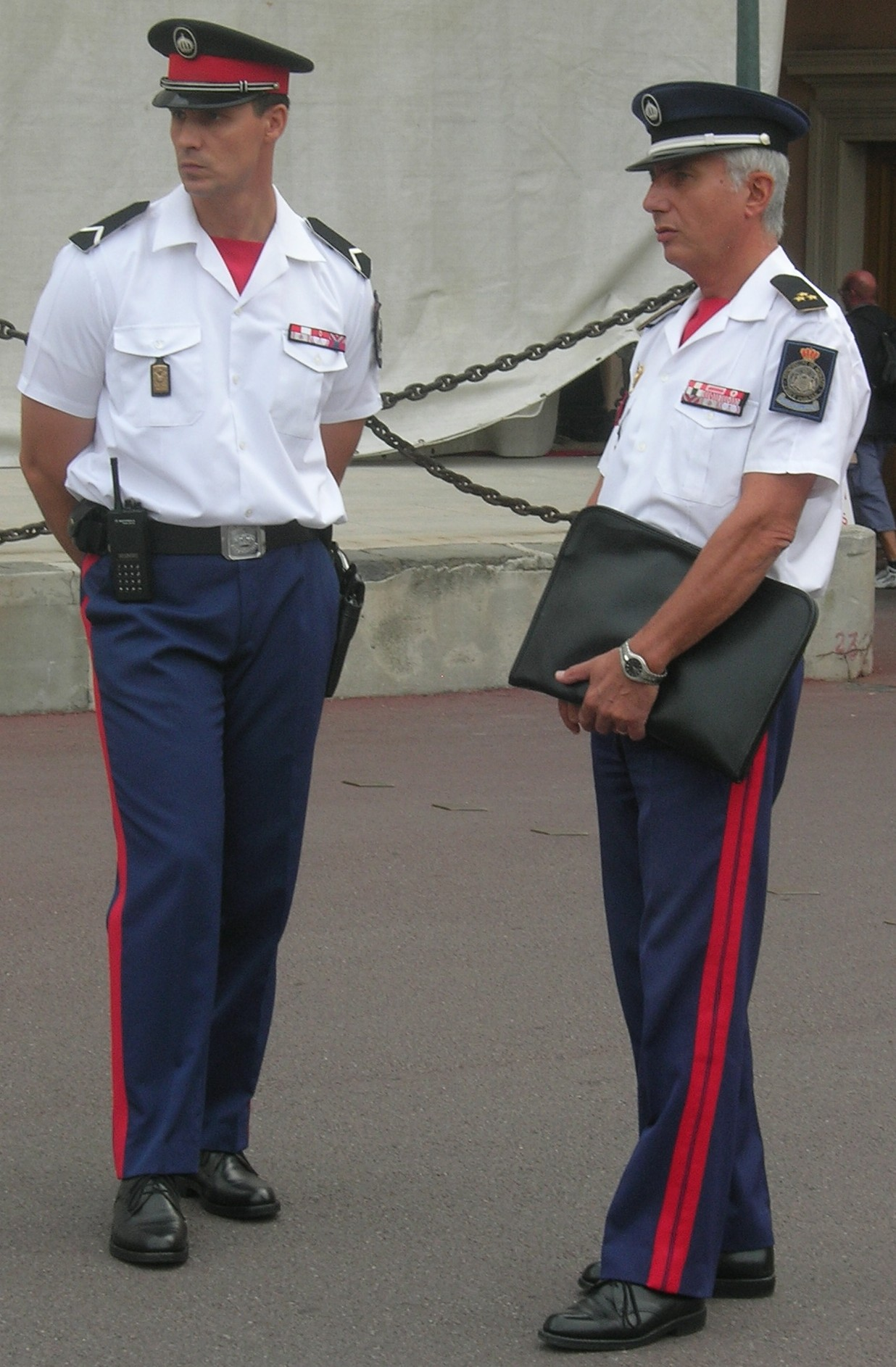
An enlisted soldier as a Non-commissioned offiicer with a rank of Brigadier (left) and a commissioned officer with the rank of Capitaine (right) of the Prince's Carabiniers

=== Compagnie des Carabiniers du Prince ===
Literally translated "Company of Carabiniers of the Prince", the English-language version of the official Government website translates the name as "The Palace Guards". The force was established in 1817 by Prince Honoré, administrator on behalf of his father, Prince Honoré IV. Originally an infantry unit, in 1904 they replaced the previous (now disbanded) "Guard Company" as the official Palace Guard of the royal family.

The Company is of a similar size to the Corps des Sapeurs-Pompiers. At the summer of 2020 the Government reported the total strength of the Compagnie des Carabiniers du Prince as 124, consisting of 3 commissioned officers, 24 non-commissioned officers, and 97 enlisted men (with another 14 civilian employees). Each officer has trained and served with the French military. Its primary duty is the defence of the prince and the Prince's Palace in the Monaco-Ville (old town) quartier of Monaco. By extension, it also has a role in guarding members of the judiciary, who administer justice in the name of the prince.

There are a number of specialist units within the Compagnie des Carabiniers du Prince, which include a motorcycle section (for rapid-response and motorcycle outriding); a bodyguard and protection unit; a diving unit with military, rescue and scientific capabilities; and a military first-aid unit that provides first aid and ambulance cover at public and sporting events.

The ceremonial "changing of the guard" at 11:55 am each day attracts large numbers of tourists. The ceremony is more than just a tourist spectacle, as this small military force is the front line of defence of the Monegasque princely family.

=== L'Orchestre militaire ===
Despite its title of "military orchestra", this section, which is attached to the Compagnie des Carabiniers du Prince, provides a full range of military music, including an orchestra, a ceremonial marching band, and state trumpeters, under the command of a Chef de l'Orchestre, with the rank of Commandant (Major). The band was established in 1978 and consists of 24 soldiers.

== Rank and insignia ==
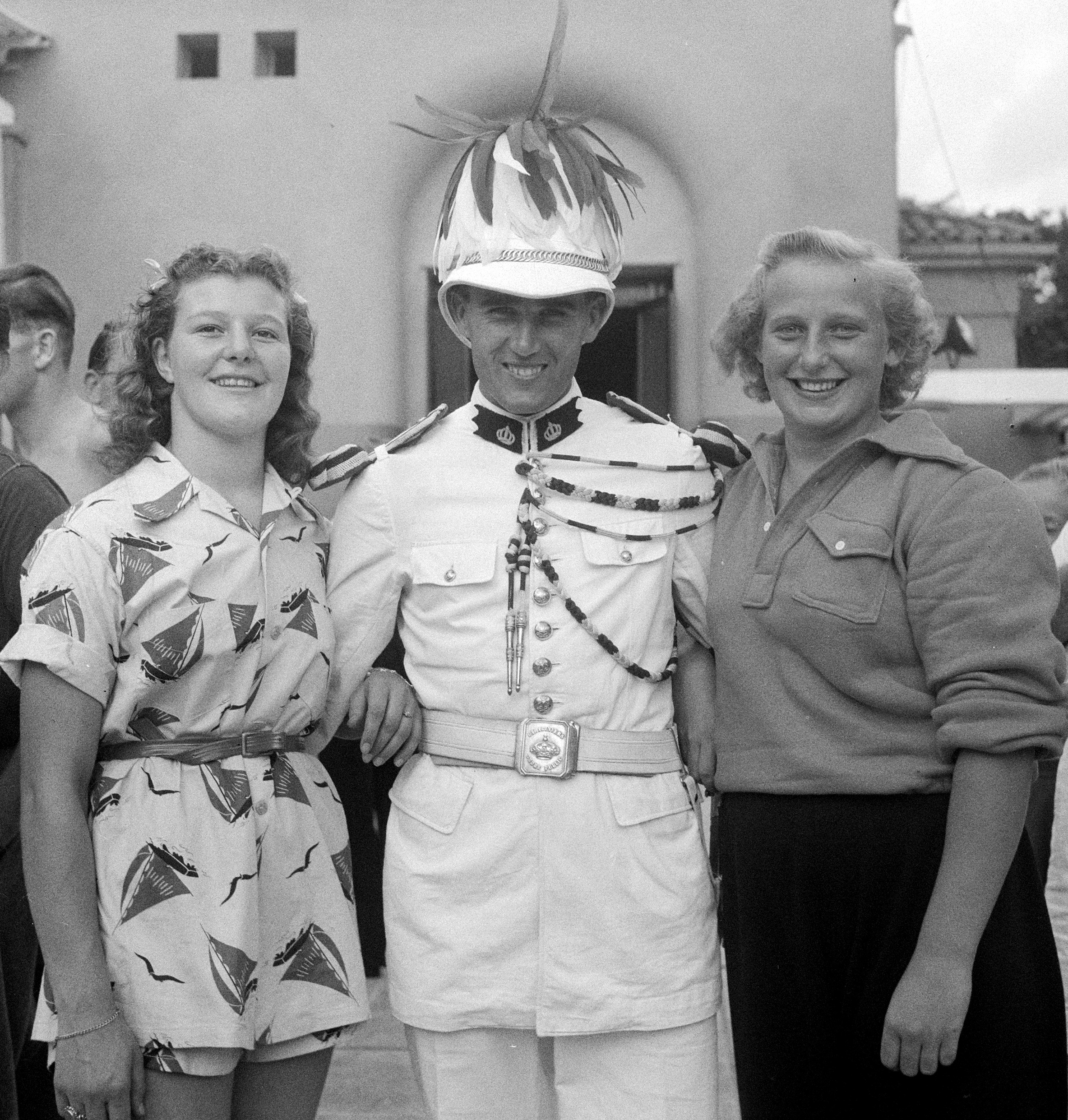
A Monegasque soldier posing with Dutch Olympic swimmers Nel van Vliet and Hannie Termeulen at the 1947 European Aquatics Championships

=== Commissioned officer ranks ===
The rank insignia of commissioned officers.

Rank group	General / flag officers	Senior officers			Junior officers
Army of Monaco
Army of Monaco	Général en chef des armées	Colonel	Lieutenant-colonel	Commandant	Capitaine	Lieutenant	Sous-Lieutenant

=== Other ranks ===
The rank insignia of non-commissioned officers and enlisted personnel.

Rank group	Senior NCOs					Junior NCOs	Enlisted
Army of Monaco
Army of Monaco	Adjudant-chef	Adjudant	Maréchal-des-logis-major	Maréchal-des-logis-chef	Maréchal-des-logis	Brigadier	Carabinier de première classe	Carabinier de deuxième classe

== Department of the Interior ==
The Département de l’Intérieur (Department of the Interior) of the Principality of Monaco is headed by a Government Counsellor–Minister appointed by the Albert II, Prince of Monaco. The Department is responsible for public security, civil protection and the oversight of the national police (Sûreté Publique) and other internal security services.

Ministers of the Department of the Interior (conseiller de gouvernement pour l'Intérieur):

- Philippe Deslandes (2001−2006)
- Paul Masseron (2006–2011)
- Patrice Cellario (2015–2024)
- Lionel Beffre (from 2024)
