= Public Security of Monaco =

National police force of Monaco

Public Security of Monaco Sûreté publique de Monaco Sügürità pǜblica de Mùnegu
- Motto: "Peace through Prosperous Policing"

Jurisdictional structure
- National agency: Monaco
- Operations jurisdiction: Monaco
- Governing body: Government of Monaco
- General nature: Civilian police

Operational structure
- Headquarters: 9, rue Suffren Reymond, MC 98000 Monaco
- Minister responsible: Patrice Cellario
- Agency executive: Eric Arella
- Parent agency: Public Services of Monaco

Website
- en.gouv.mc/Government-Institutions/The-Government/Ministry-of-Interior/Police-Department

The Public Security of Monaco (French: Sûreté publique de Monaco; Monégasque: Sügürità pǜblica de Mùnegu) is the national police force of the Principality of Monaco. It is subordinated from the Monegasque Department of Interior (Ministry of Interior) and consists of 515 men and women. With 515 police officers for 35,000 people in 198 hectares (490 acres), Monaco has the largest per-capita and per-area police force and police presence in the world. Its police includes a specialist unit which operates patrol and surveillance boats.

As of 2019, police officers in Monaco held the distinction of being the highest paid police officers in the world, with a starting salary of $74,000 USD and a median of $115,000 USD.

== Organisation ==
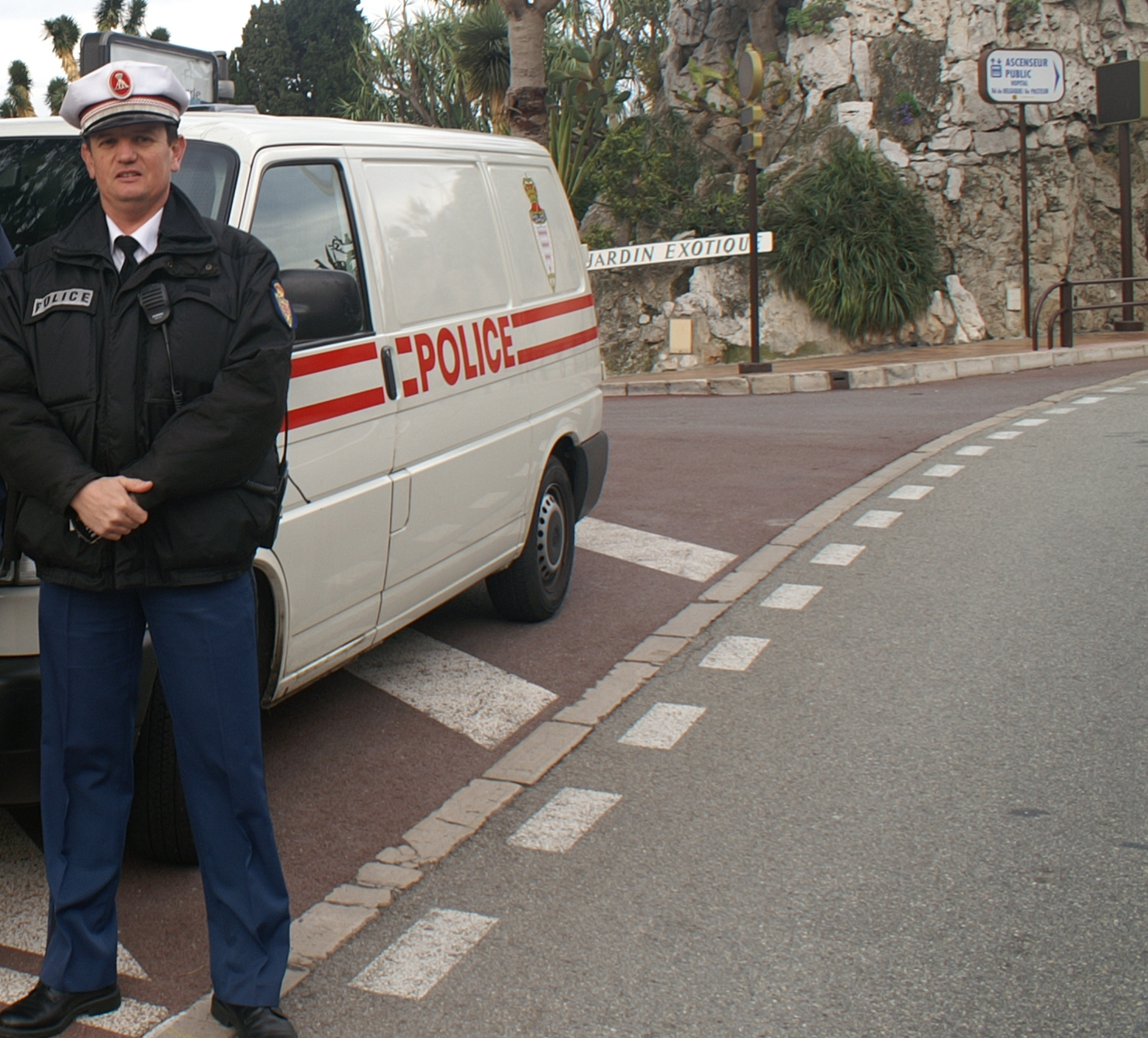
Police officer of Monaco.

The Directorate of Public Safety (French: Direction de la Sûreté Publique) administers the Monegasque National Police force (officially the "Public Security of Monaco", but operating under the name "Police"). The Directorate was created on June 23, 1902, under the Department of the Interior.

The police force itself consists of several divisions each with several departments:

- The Criminal Police Division has three main departments, Criminal Investigations, Criminal Identity (co-ordinating with INTERPOL) and Resources.
- The Urban Police Division co-ordinates the activities of the uniformed police officers and also employs a number of units, including a General Police Brigade, Protection, Surveillance and Intervention Group, Operational Command Centre and a Secretariat to the Police Court.
- The Administrative Police Division is responsible for the movement of foreign nationals through Monaco's borders, while the Division of the Administration and the Formation handles administration matters for the police force.
- The Maritime and Airport Police Divisions police the seas and skies of Monaco. The latter divisions both employ departments pertaining to air and sea rescue, water surveillance and the co-ordination of trans-border police operations with Monaco's neighbours. The Division of the Maritime and Airport Police (DPMA) itself was created on 16 August 1960 when security issues in the air and on the water were transferred to the control of the Director of Public Safety, and since 1961 the division has grown to consist of 8 officers and 27 civil servants. The Maritime Section controls and registers passengers in transit, is in charge of national waters surveillance, including submarine natural resources, and sea-rescue. The Trans-border and Heliport Control Section oversees border police missions.

They currently possess 3 patrol boats, which they share with the Compagnie des Carabiniers du Prince, and the Corps des Sapeurs-Pompiers.
