= Compagnie des Carabiniers du Prince =

Infantry branch of Monaco's Public Force

Prince's Company of Carabiniers
- Compagnie des Carabiniers du Prince (French); Cumpagnia d'i Carrabiniei d'u Prìncipu (Monégasque)
- Patch of the Compagnie des Carabiniers du Prince
- Active: 8 December 1817 – present
- Country: Monaco
- Branch: Force Publique
- Type: Foot Guards, and Gendarmerie
- Role: Close Protection
- Size: One company, 124 personnel
- Garrison/HQ: Moneghetti
- Mottos: "Honour, loyalty, devotion"
- Engagements: French Revolutionary Wars; Monégasque Revolution; Tōhoku Disaster (Note: An eleven man peacekeeping and rescue force was deployed; however, the majority were Sapeurs-Pompiers.)
- Website: carabiniers.gouv.mc

Commanders
- Chief Commander: Prince Albert II of Monaco
- Ceremonial chief: Lt. Colonel Martial Pied
- Notable commanders: Colonel Luc Fringant; Lt. Colonel Philippe Rebaudengo

Insignia
- Plume: Red over White

The Compagnie des Carabiniers du Prince (Monégasque: Cumpagnia d'i Carrabiniei d'u Prìncipu, lit. 'Prince's Company of Carabiniers') is the infantry branch of the Public Force, and one of the limited number of militaries that recruits foreigners. Although Monaco's defence is the responsibility of France, Monaco maintains a small force for the protection of the Prince and the Prince's Palace. Formed by Prince Honoré IV in 1817, the unit was re-organized in 1909.

The company numbers 124 officers and men. Whilst the NCOs and soldiers are local, the officers have served in the French Army or the Republican Guard. Along with the Corps des Sapeurs-Pompiers, the Carabiniers form Monaco's total public forces.

== History ==
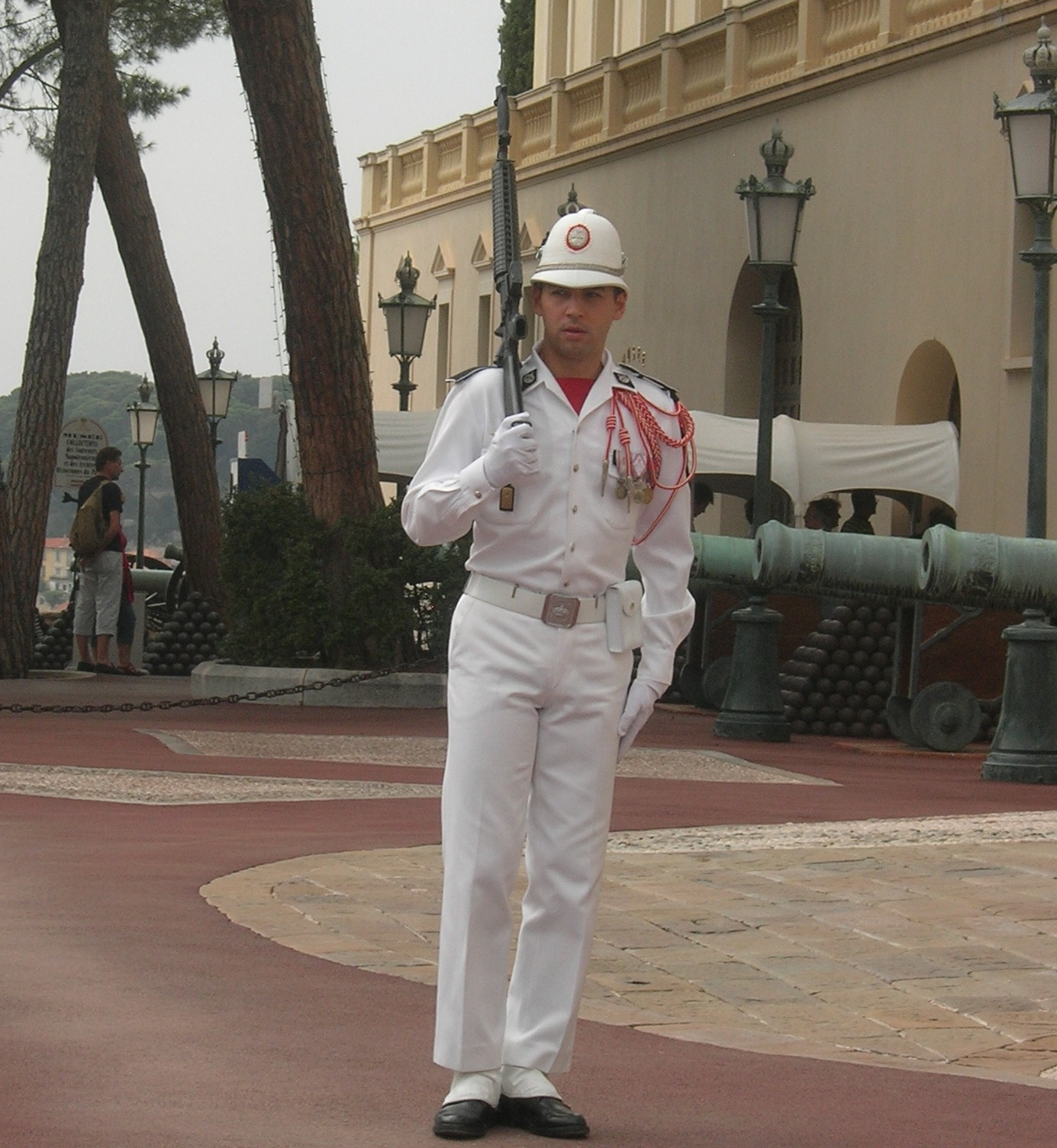
Carabinier at the Prince's Palace in Monaco-Ville.

An antecedent of the Carabiniers was the company known in the 19th century as the "Papalins", former soldiers of the Papal States, who, upon the destitution of the Papacy's temporal authority at the time of the Italian Unification, were given the role of protecting the Sovereign and the Princely Family. A road in Fontvieille is named in honour of them.

In Monaco, the Milice Nationale was created in 1865. In 1870, the Milice Nationale was renamed the Gardes du Prince, although, the "Gardes" were still tasked with fire-fighting, and national security. On 5 May 1881 the Gardes du Prince were renamed the Compagnie de Sapeurs-Pompiers to better adjust to their fire-fighting duties. On 17 June 1909 the fire-fighting unit was re-organised into a separate operating company called the Compagnie de Sapeurs-Pompiers, while the protection unit was renamed the Corps des Carabiniers du Prince. This lasted over 60 years, until the companies were finally renamed the Corps des Sapeurs-Pompiers, and the Compagnie des Carabiniers du Prince, and were placed under the Force Publique's direct control.

The Carabiniers are currently commanded by Martial Pied, who was sworn in on 2 January 2022. Previous commanders include, Gilles Convertini (2017-2022), Philippe Rebaudengo (2007-2017), Jacques Morandon (2005-2007), Luc Fringant (1993-2005), and Maurice Allent (1978-1993).

== Organisation and budget ==
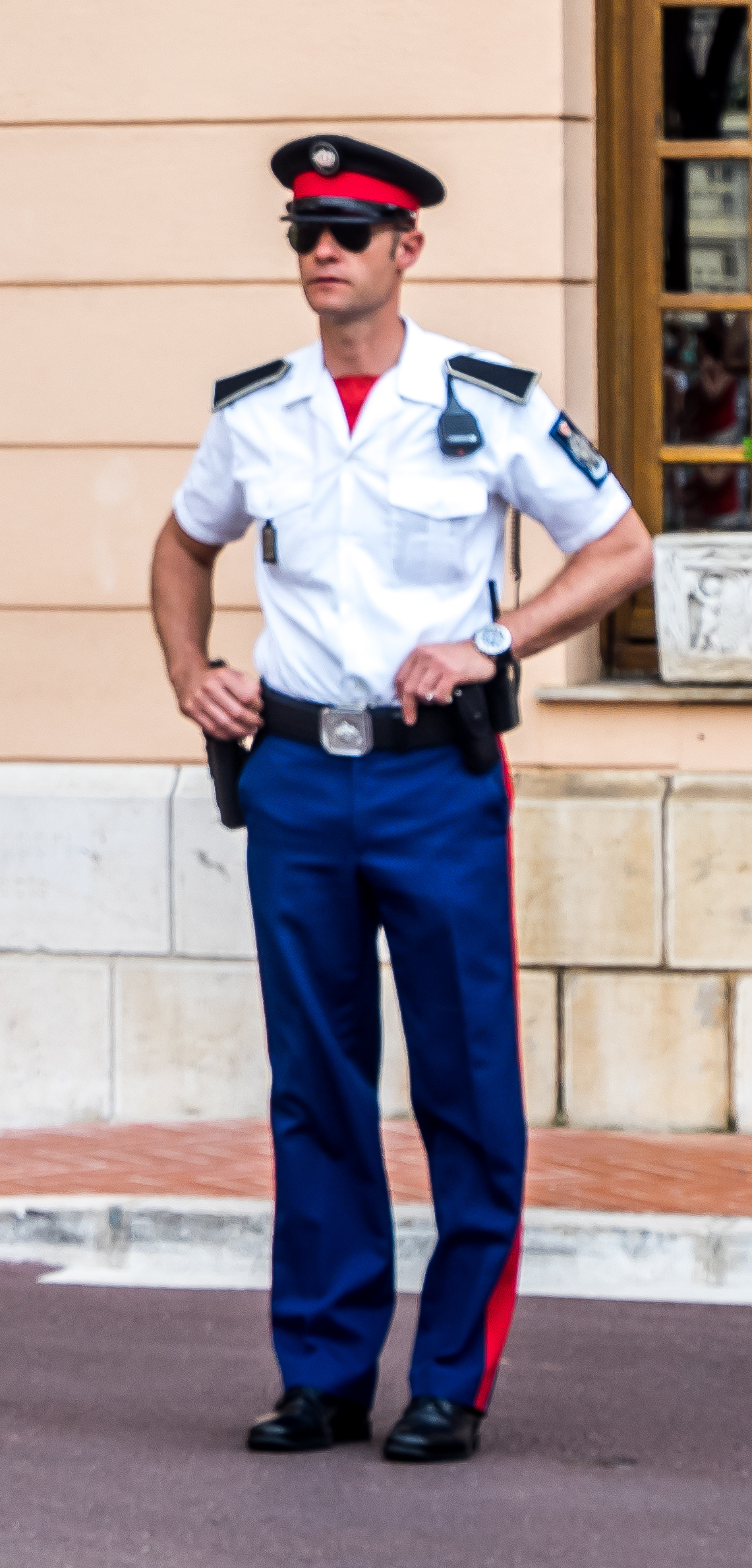
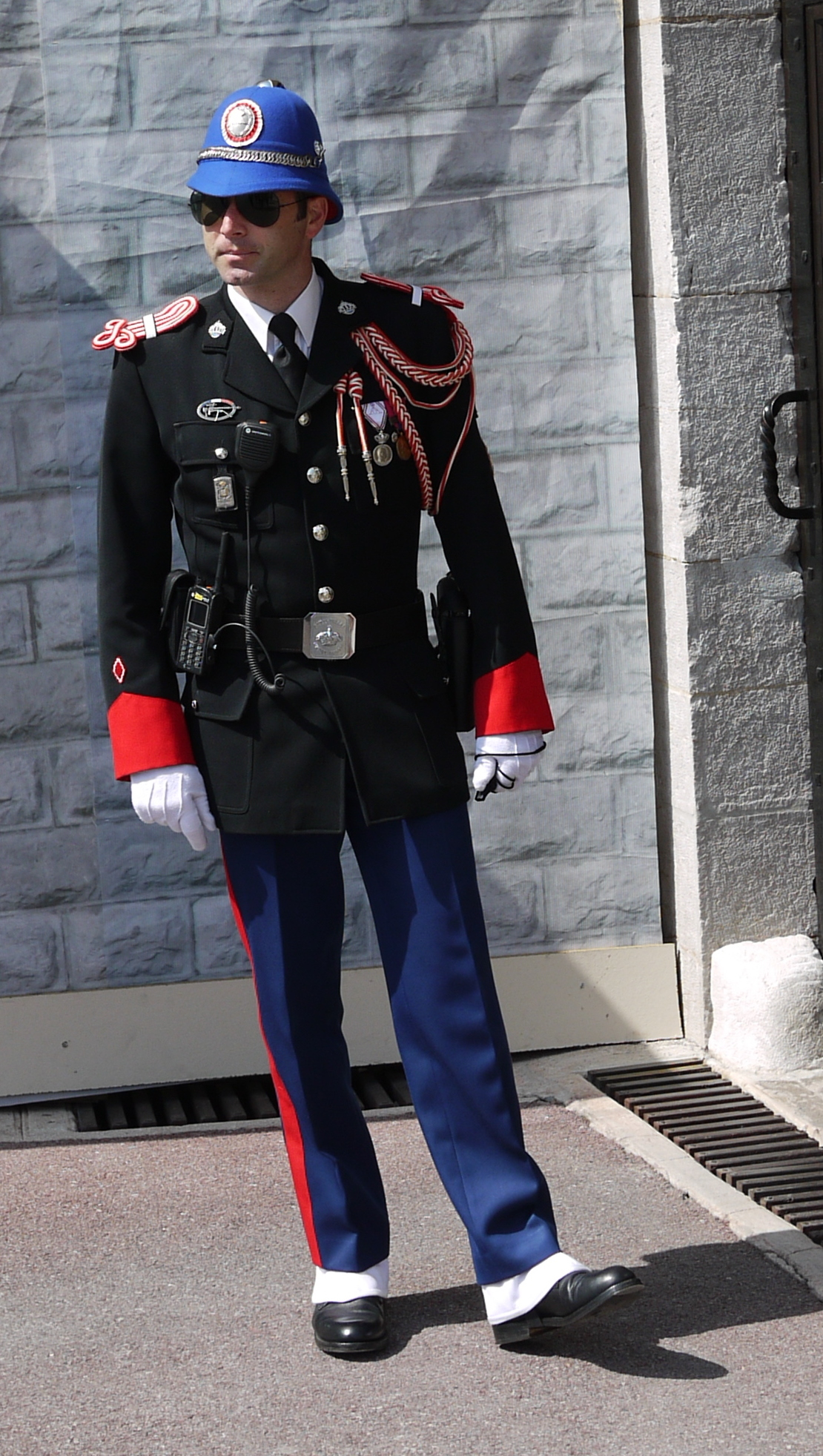
Left: everyday uniform. Right: dress uniform.

Composed of 119 personnel of Francophone nationality (3 officers, 19 non-commissioned officers, and 97 men of rank), the Carabiniers are split into the following divisions:

- Band;
- Diving Team;
- Motorcycle Platoon;
- Bodyguard Unit;
- Palace Guard;
- Honour Guard;
- Civil Defence.

The 2012-2013 starting salary for a Carabinier is €2,200 ($2,908) a month or €26,400 ($34,893) a year. While the Company's 2012-2013 budget is €6.7 million ($8.8 million) per year.

== Duties and missions ==
Compagnie des Carabiniers du Prince - Barracks.

Since its inception, the Carabiniers were tasked with guarding the Prince's Palace, ensuring the security of the Sovereign and the Princely Family, to provide services to honour, and to assist law enforcement in times of need. The Palace is guarded at all times, twenty-four hours a day, with two non-commissioned officers of varying rank, one Maréchal des logis, and eight Carabiniers. The Changing of the Guard, is performed daily at 11.55 am, and announced by a musical element (two drums, two trumpets).

The Carabiniers provides services of honour. To "requisition", the Company escorts judiciary, participates in official ceremonies, civil and religious, and ceremonial parades and processions.

The Carabiniers also perform various missions of public service. With the creation of a Military Aid Unit, the Carabiniers implement ambulances for the Monegasque Red Cross. The Company participate as such, the security of major sporting events or arts that take place in the Principality, requiring emergency supplies and evacuation. The Company participate as appropriate in the implementation of emergency plan, ORMOS Red Plan (Monaco relief organisation), which also includes the Corps des Sapeurs-Pompiers, and the Direction de la Sûreté Publique.

The Diving Team is regularly asked to integrate with security devices, and participate in various rescue missions during the sailing competitions in Monegasque waters. They also participate in scientific observations, underwater environment for the study of pollution in the Mediterranean.

A Motorcycle Platoon is responsible for the Prince on his daily schedule, and escorting sovereign heads of state visiting Monaco.

== Band ==
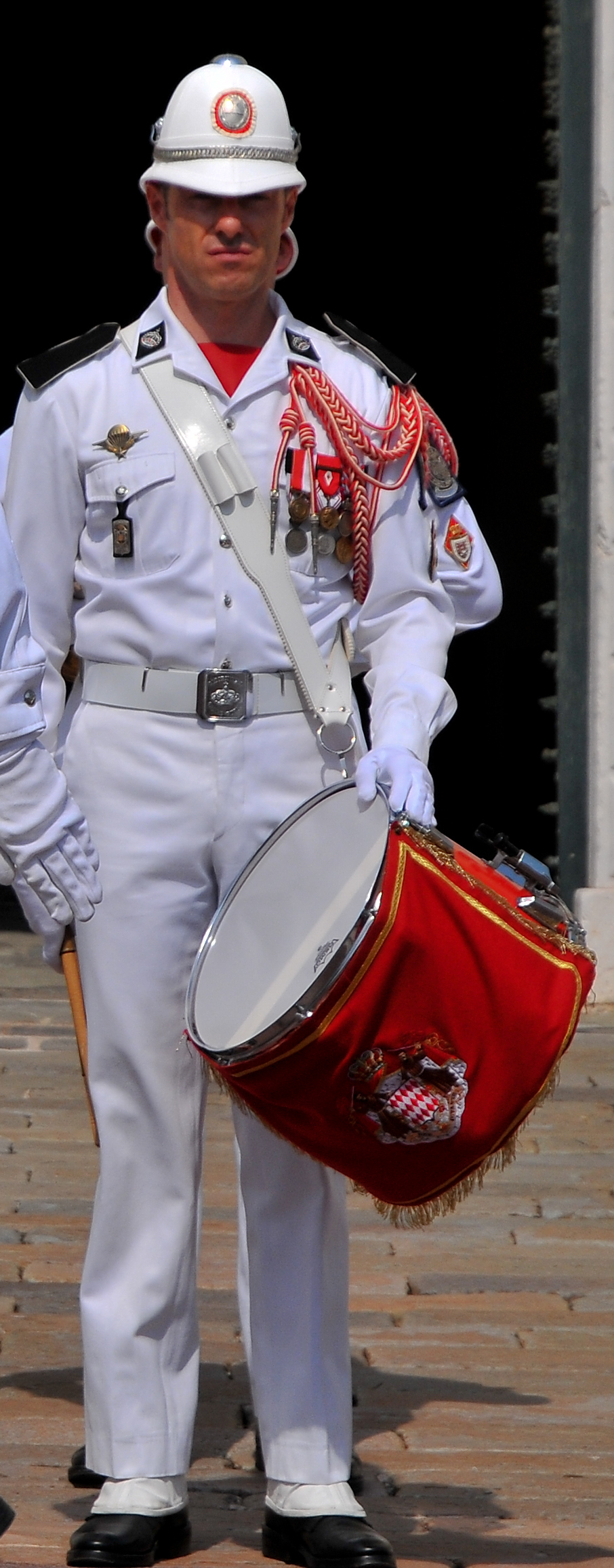
A drummer of the band.

The Carabiniers maintain a musical band consisting of 26 "rifle-musicians" under the command of a Maréchal des Logis Chef. In 1978, the title of "Fanfare de la Companies des Carabiniers" was adopted. An integral part of the unit, the band is not trained solely to perform music. Instead, Carabiniers receive the same training as their comrades. The band participates in the same occasions, and duties as the Company. The diversity of the repertoire of the band allows it to perform at official ceremonies, sporting events, and public concerts. Since 1989, the band has performed outside of Monaco.

== Equipment ==
The equipment and vehicles of the Carabiniers have been upgraded in recent years. Mobility has been improved by the adoption of modern vehicles, adapted to different missions, such as two MOWAG Piranha Vs, six Peugeot P4s, and seven BMW R1200RT-Ps.

Old rifles and revolvers have been replaced by firearms such as the M16A2, and Glock 17.

== Uniforms ==
Parade dress in the winter is a modernised version of that worn in the early 1900s. It comprises a dark blue tunic, and light blue trousers with red facings. A medium-blue cloth helmet is worn, with plumes for gala occasions. White trefoil epaulettes, spats and aiguillettes date from the 19th century.

In the summer a simple white shirt sleeve order is worn with a white helmet. For ordinary duties a modern police style uniform is worn with a peaked cap replacing the helmet.

== Vehicles ==
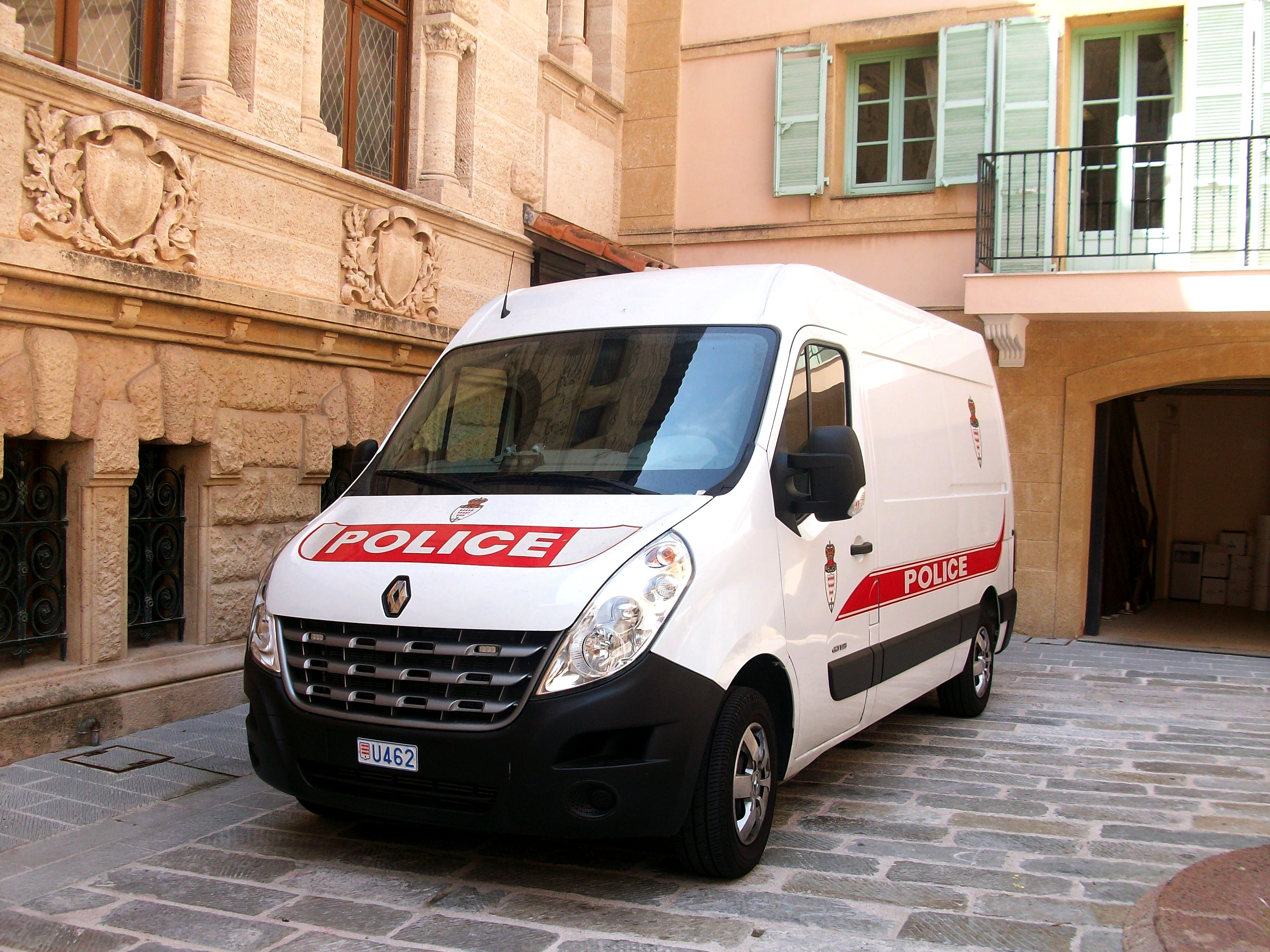
Police version of the Renault Master in Monaco-Ville.

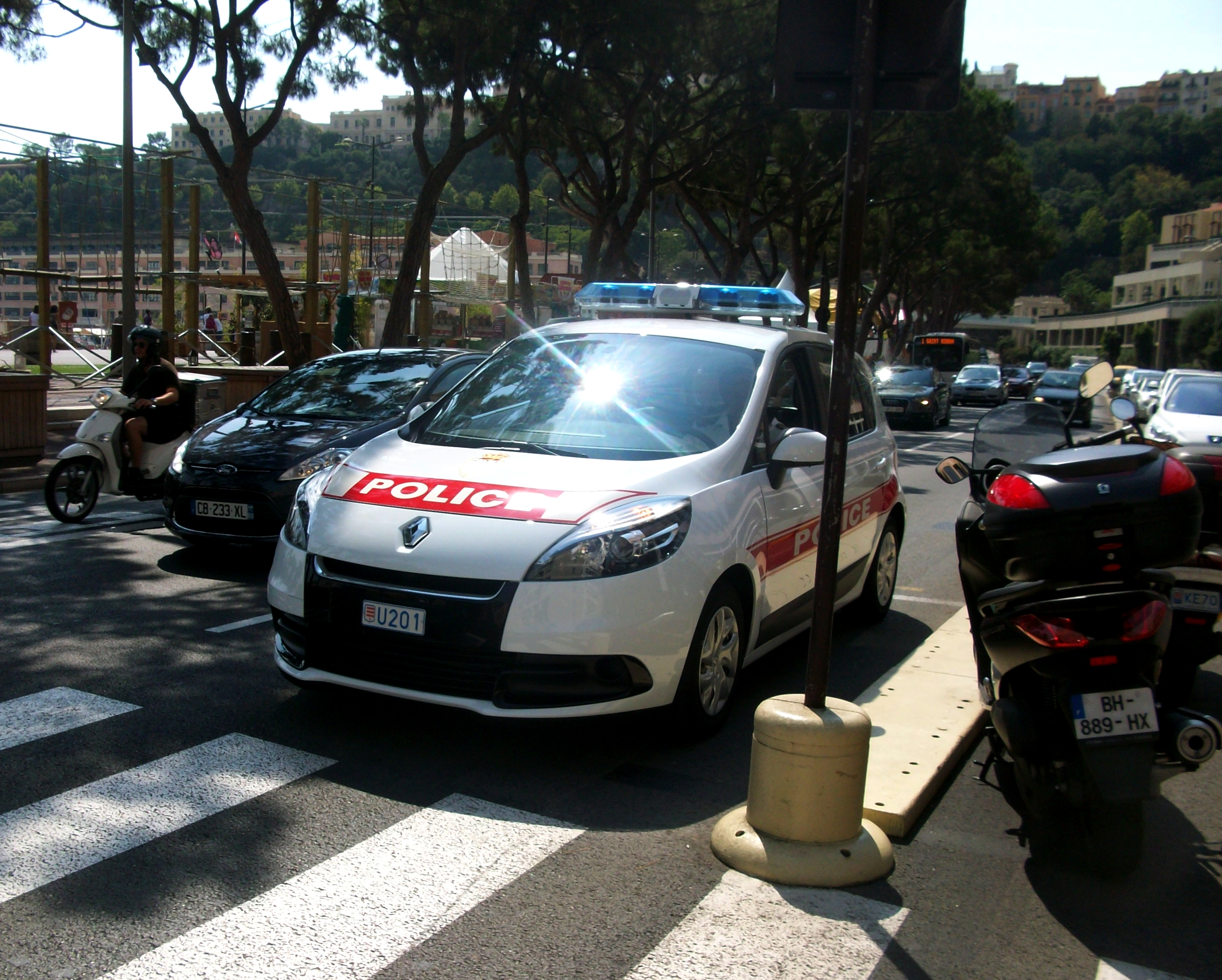
Police version of the Renault Scenic in La Condamine.

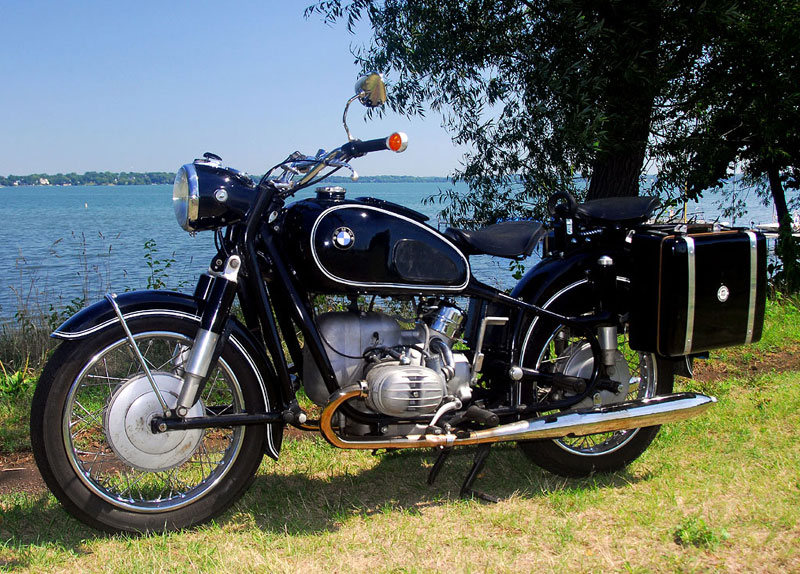
BMW R60 in 1967.

=== Current ===
Vehicle	Country of origin	Type	In service (ca.)	Notes
Mowag Piranha V	Switzerland	Armoured fighting vehicle	2	
BMW R1200RT-P	Germany	Motorcycle	7	
Peugeot P4	France	Utility 4x4	6	
Renault Master	France	Minivan	4	
Renault Scenic	France	Compact MPV	4	
Renault Espace	France	Large MPV	2	

(Note: Ordered by largest to smallest quantity.)

=== Former ===
Vehicle	Country of origin	Type	In service (ca.)	Notes
Dodge WC series	United States	Light truck	3	
GMC CCKW	United States	Heavy truck	1	
Harley-Davidson WLA	United States	Motorcycle	11	
Zündapp 250	Germany	Motorcycle	4	
BMW R50	Germany	Motorcycle	9	
BMW R60	Germany	Motorcycle	11	
BMW R65	Germany	Motorcycle	9	

(Note: Ordered by oldest to newest.)

== Weapons ==
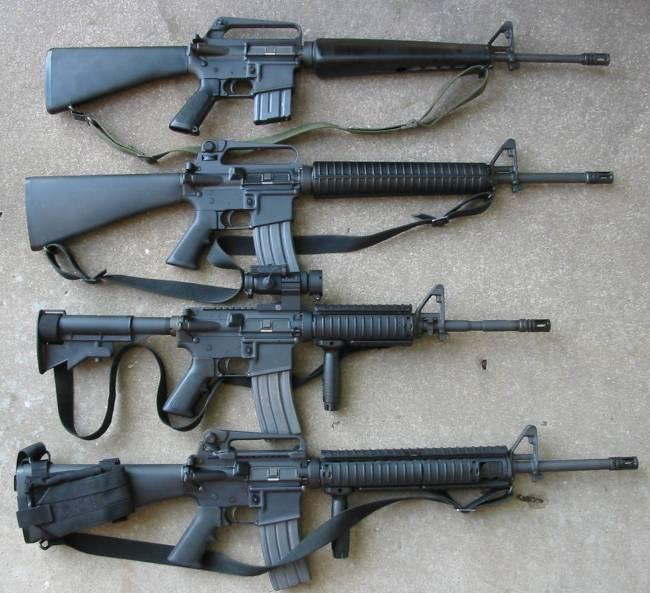
From top to bottom: M16A1, M16A2, M4A1, M16A4.

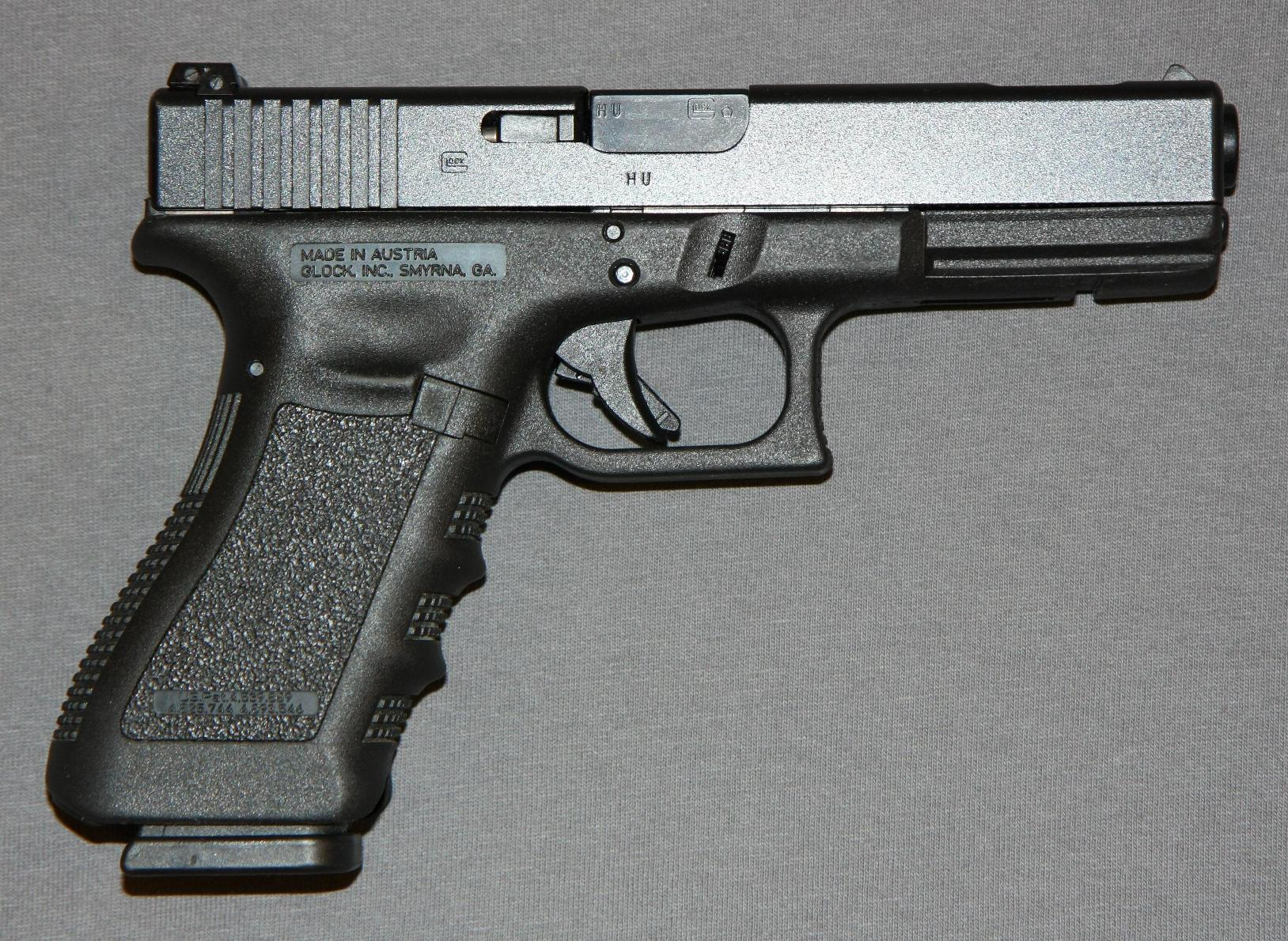
Glock 17.

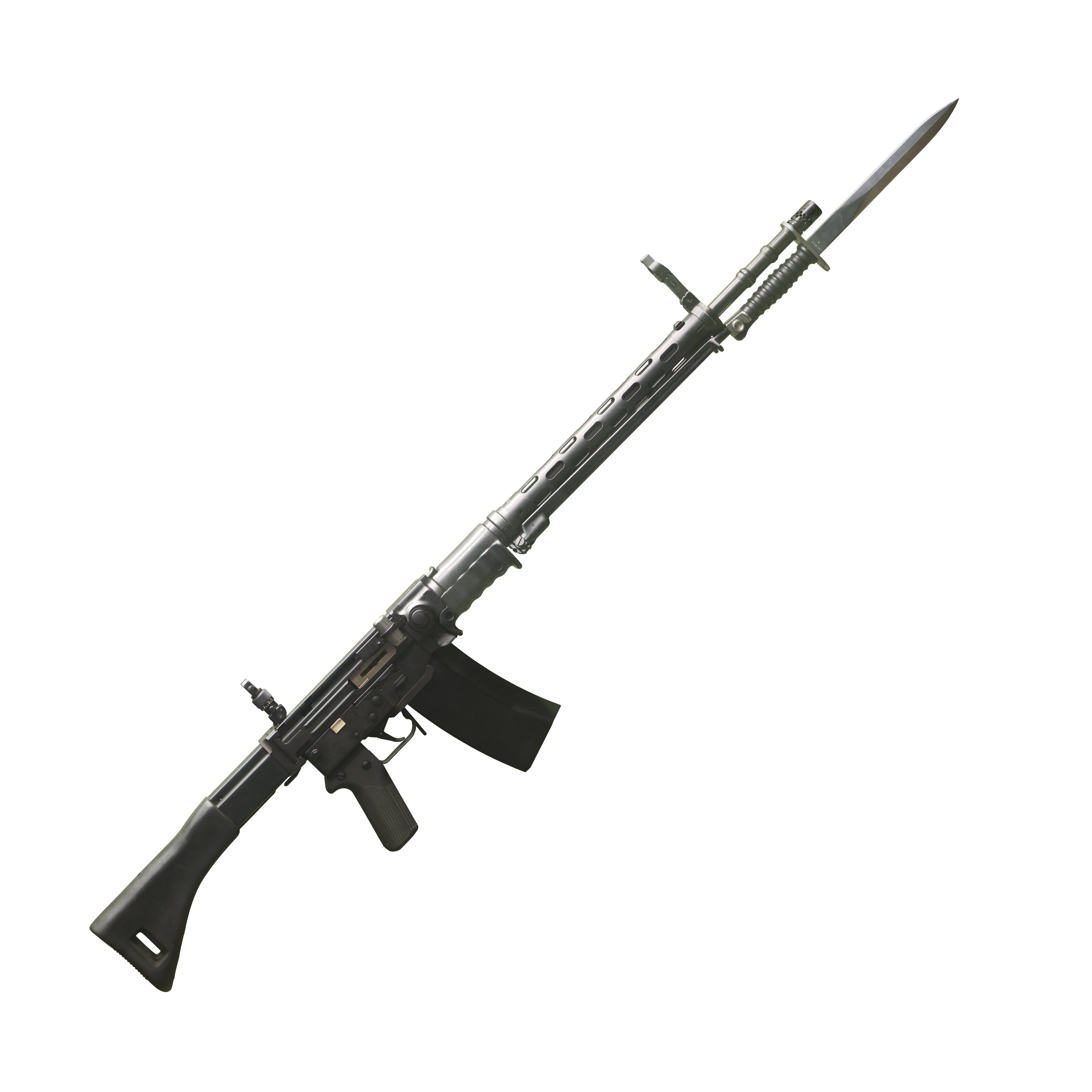
SIG SG 510.

=== Current ===
Weapon	Country of origin	Type	In service (ca.)	Notes
Glock 17 Gen 3	Austria	Semi-automatic pistol	100	
Beretta 92	Italy	Semi-automatic pistol	12	
SIG P210	Switzerland	Semi-automatic pistol	12 (Note: Originally 12 pistols were used, however, many pistols have been permanently retired.)	
M16A2	United States	Assault rifle	100	
M4A1	United States	Assault rifle	12	
SIG SG 510	Switzerland	Battle rifle	80 (Note: Originally 80 rifles were used, however, many rifles have been permanently retired.)	
FN MAG	Belgium	General-purpose machine gun	6	
LGI Mle F1	France	Mortar	3	

=== Former ===
Weapon	Country of origin	Type	In service (ca.)	Notes
Fusil modèle 1866	France	Bolt-action rifle	70	
Remington Rolling Block rifle	United States	Rolling block	60	
Fusil Gras Modèle 1874 M80	France	Bolt-action rifle	60	
Modèle 1874 Revolver	France	Service Revolver	110	
Fusil Mle 1886 M93	France	Bolt-action rifle	80	
Modèle 1892 Revolver	France	Service Revolver	100	
MAS Modèle 36	France	Bolt-action rifle	80	
MAS Modèle 49	France	Semi-automatic rifle	110	

== Recruitment ==
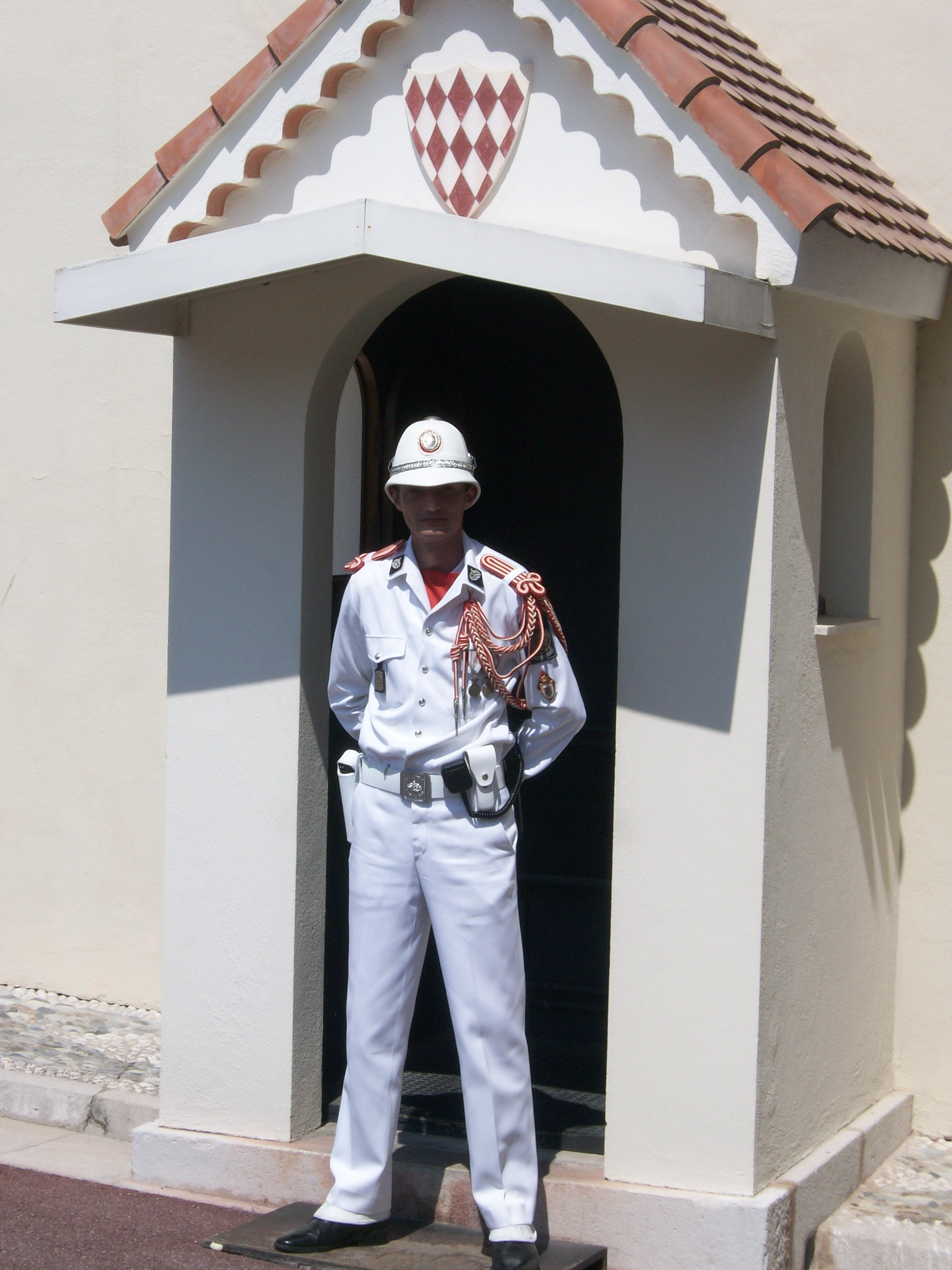
Carabinier at the Prince's Palace in Monaco-Ville.

Carabiniers are recruited from among candidates who meet the following conditions:

- Male;
- Between 19 and 27 years old;
- Single (marriage licence granted after the confirmation period);
- Francophone;
- Pass a vision examination;
- Within a minimum height of 1.8 m to a maximum height of 2 m;
- Body mass index less than or equal to twenty-five;
- Pass a physical fitness test and examination;
- Graduated with a high school or equivalent degree;
- Possess a driving licence;
- Capable of swimming.

Applicants may be esteemed if they know skills in one or more specialties relevant to the carabiniers. For instance: music (primarily band instruments), diving, first aid, culinary, computer, mechanics training, or combat experience.

== Career development ==
At the time of his enlistment, a Carabinier signs his first contract for five years which is validated after a period of instruction, and confirmation period in which ability and motivation are verified. This confirmation is usually after one year's service, but may be extended for one or even two years further probation. A Carabinier can pursue his career and commitments by successive reenlistments after each five years of service until reaching age 55, subjecting to meet all the conditions of fitness. Promotion on merit allows a number of Carabiniers to reach the various grades of non-commissioned officers. However, the low rate of vacancies occurring amongst non-commissioned officers means that 50% of more junior ranks finish their military careers as a Carabinier first or second class.

== Rank insignia ==
Rank Insignia (All ranks in French)
Sovereign Prince (GO)
Général en chef des armées (Note: Retained by His Serene Highness the Prince of Monaco as his constitutional role.)
Commissioned Officer (CO)
Colonel	Lieutenant Colonel	Commandant
Capitaine	Lieutenant	Sous Lieutenant
Non Commissioned Officer (NCO)
Assistant	Adjudant Chef	Adjutant
Maréchal des Logis Major	Maréchal des Logis Chef	Maréchal des logis
Enlisted
Brigadier	Carabinier Première Classe	Carabinier

== See also ==
- Daniel Ducruet (former Carabinier)
- Théophile Bellando de Castro (former Carabinier)
- Force Publique
- Corps des Sapeurs-Pompiers de Monaco
