= Jean-Pierre Laflaquière =

French official, High Commissioner of French Polynesia

High Commissioner of the Republic in French Polynesia
- In office 1 August 2012 – 22 August 2013
- Preceded by: Richard Didier
- Succeeded by: Lionel Beffre

Prefect of Manche
- In office 30 January 2009 – 22 July 2011
- Preceded by: Jean Charbonniaud
- Succeeded by: Adolphe Colrat

Prefect of Guyane
- In office 20 July 2006 – 30 January 2009
- Preceded by: Ange Mancini
- Succeeded by: Daniel Ferey

Personal details
- Born: 18 August 1960 (age 65) Toulouse, Haute-Garonne, France

Jean-Pierre Laflaquière (born 18 August 1947 in Toulouse, France) is a retired French senior civil servant. His last office was High Commissioner of the Republic in French Polynesia from 3 September 2012 to 23 August 2013. His successor was Lionel Beffre. He was Prefect without assignment from 2011 to 2012.

Laflaquière previously served as the Prefect of Guyane (French Guiana) from 2006 to 2009.

== Honours and decorations ==
=== National honours ===
Ribbon bar	Honour
	Officer of the National Order of the Legion of Honour
	Knight of the National Order of Merit

=== Ministerial honours ===
Ribbon bar	Honour
	Knight of the Order of Academic Palms
	Knight of the Order of Agricultural Merit

=== Civilian medals ===
Ribbon bar	Honour
	Medal of youth and sports
