= Pukpuk Treaty =

Mutual defense pact

Papua New Guinea-Australia Mutual Defence Treaty
- Type: Mutual defense pact
- Signed: 6 October 2025
- Location: Parliament House, Canberra, Australia
- Signatories: Anthony Albanese (Prime Minister of Australia); James Marape (Prime Minister of Papua New Guinea)
- Parties: Australia; Papua New Guinea
- Languages: English

The Pukpuk Treaty is a mutual defence treaty signed in October 2025.

== History ==
In February 2025, Australia and Papua New Guinea announced talks on a full defence treaty, which would be deeper than the 2023 agreement. Both countries already had a defence cooperation deal, and the goal of the full defence was to enhance military cooperation and interoperability, as per Australia's Defence Minister Richard Marles. The treaty planned to deepen integration between the two nations' defence forces. Papua New Guinea Defence Minister Billy Joseph stressed close ties with Australia, calling them "tied to the hips". While discussions were being undertaken, military cooperation deepened with the completion of an Australian-funded expansion of Papua New Guinea's Lombrum Naval Base. This expansion, which Australian Minister for Defence Richard Marles called the "biggest infrastructure project that Australia has ever undertaken in the Pacific", was undertaken in the expectation that the base would be able to be used by Australian ships as well as those of Papua New Guinea.

A deal was reached in September 2025, under which both country's militaries would become fully integrated, with Joseph stating "We're not talking about interoperability, we're talking about totally integrated forces". Joseph also compared the resulting alliance to that of Article 4 of the North Atlantic Treaty. Citizens of both countries can be hired by either military, and serving in the Australian military would provide a path to Australian citizenship. Australian forces will have full access to certain sites in Papua New Guinea, and both countries will be legally obligated to assist the other in the case of attack. The treaty has been officially designated the Pukpuk Treaty (meaning "Crocodile Treaty"). A submission to the Papua New Guinean cabinet stated "[The treaty] has the ability to bite and like a crocodile, its bite force speaks of the interoperability's and preparedness of the military for war."

The timing of the deal meant it was planned to come into force the day before the 50th anniversary of Papua New Guinea's independence from Australia. Its strengthening of the security relationship was seen as part of a continued response to Papua New Guinea's relationship with China, as well as China's growing influence in the wider region. The ability for foreign citizens to serve in the Australian military was previously extended only to other members of the Five Eyes group. The pact was expected to be signed on 17 September, the day after the independence celebrations in Papua New Guinea which will be attended by Australian Prime Minister Anthony Albanese. Albanese stated that the deal means that Papua New Guinea will be a defence partner on the same level as the United States.

On 17 September 2025, the leaders of Australia and Papua New Guinea signed a defence communique. Albanese stated that the Papua New Guinea cabinet meeting did not achieve a quorum. Papua New Guinean Prime Minister James Marape stated that the delay was unrelated to China, and that Joseph would travel to countries such as China and Indonesia to explain the pact. The Papua New Guinea cabinet subsequently approved the treaty on 2 October. Papua New Guinean Prime Minister James Marape and Australian Prime Minister Anthony Albanese signed the treaty in Canberra on 6 October 2025.

In mid-October 2025, the Indonesian government urged Australia and Papua New Guinea to respect its sovereignty and independence following the signing of the Pukpuk Treaty.

== Provisions ==
With the ratification of the treaty, Australia and Papua New Guinea both plan to permit citizens of each country to enlist or serve on secondment in their respective defence forces.
