= Conscription in Monaco =

Conscription in Monaco existed between 1848 and 1870 when the Monégasque Militia was active. Since then, Monégasque citizens have been exempt both from conscription and direct taxation.

== History: a tradition of volunteering ==
Placed under the military protection of neighbouring powers throughout most of its history, the Principality of Monaco, though it distinguished itself by voluntary service in heroic battles to defend the Papacy or the Kingdom of France, went through a period of conscription between 1848 and 1870 when a militia was formed.

=== The Guelfes of the pope and the defenders of the Holy Roman Empire (1215–1641) ===
The Grimaldi dynasty is a princely house originating in Genoa, founded by the Genoese leader of the Guelphs, Francesco Grimaldi, who in 1297 took the lordship of Monaco along with his soldiers dressed as Franciscans. Since its foundation, Monaco has had a tradition of voluntary military service to defend the Papacy and the Holy Roman Empire.

=== Serving the Kingdom of France (1681–1791): Charles-Maurice of Monaco, the Knight Prince ===
Following the signing of the Treaty of Péronne in 1641, a French garrison was to occupy the fortress, but the prince was to preserve his sovereign rights and Monaco was forbidden from raising its own army.

Though the principality could not raise its own army, some voluntarily joined the French Royal Army such as Charles-Maurice of Monaco, Count of Valentinois, dubbed "the Knight Prince". Appointed Gendarmerie guidon in 1745, at the age of 18, he participated a few months later in the Battle of Fontenoy, during which he was wounded on 11 May 1745.

=== The Jourdan law: the French Revolution imposing conscription on Monaco (1793–1815) ===
Monaco was subject to the Jourdan law which imposed universal conscription in the modern sense. During the revolutionary celebrations, propaganda was used to encourage the Monégasque to join the army.

The Treaty of Vienna signed in 1815 liberated Monaco from French occupation and provided that one of the signatories would send his army to protect the fortress of Monaco. In 1819, the Treaty of Stupinigi put the principality of the Kingdom of Sardinia. In the meanwhile, the prince organized the first Carabiniers du Prince, which were to disband as soon as the soldiers from Piedmont would enter the principality.

=== The Monégasque Militia (1848–1870) ===
Facing unrest in Menton, Prince Florestan raised a voluntary army or national guard on 29 August 1848, which lasted twenty years. Reformed by Charles III in 1857, its presence became crucial after the departure of the army of the Kingdom of Sardinia. An ordinance published on 8 April 1865 gave more structure and organization to the national militia, which included fire fighters and artillery. Conscription became compulsory for all Monégasque men between twenty-one and forty years of age. Foreigners who owned land in the principality were also conscribed. Those suffering from ill health as well as criminals deemed unworthy of serving the prince were exempted. A special Census Council was put in place for the proper recruitment of all valid men. The militia was under the authority of the Municipality of Monaco and its budget was voted upon by the National Council of Monaco. The militia was finally disbanded on 18 March 1870.

=== Franco-Monégasque Treaties (1870–2004) ===
After the Franco-Monégasque treaty of 1861, Monaco came under the military protection of the Second French Empire. The principality was forced to disband its militia and opt for the presence of a foreign army once again.

Many Monégasques have volunteered to defend France. The most notable example being Prince Louis II, dubbed "the Soldier Prince". Louis II had left the French army as a lieutenant in 1899. Louis II voluntarily reenlisted in the First World War, distinguished himself at Craonne and Chemin des Dames. Cited on three accounts, he received numerous military decorations. He did not leave the army for good until 1922, to succeed his father.

The Monégasque were exempt from conscription and enrolled in the French army on a voluntary base only. However, French nationals on Monégasque territory remained bound to conscription to the French army.

== Conscription law ==
Service in the public forces of Monaco is open exclusively to French citizens: therefore it is impossible for a Monégasque citizen to serve among the Palace Guards.

Since an ordinance promulgated on 26 June 1900 and enshrined in the Civil Code of Monaco, any Monégasque citizen who, without government authorization, takes military service abroad can be deprived of his nationality.

The end of conscription in 1870 was seen as a reason of the demographic boom in Monaco in the second half of the 19th century, as conscription no longer postponed weddings and the foundation of new families.

In the 1960s, while many in the anti-war movement criticised the engagement of neighbouring France in Indochina and Algeria, as well as strict conscription, Monaco was seen as a place where freedom of enterprise could be enjoyed as well as freedom from conscription.

== Bibliography ==
- Schoeffer, Paul (1875). Les institutions et les lois de la principauté de Monaco (in French). Imprimerie du Journal.
