= Patrice Cellario =

Monégasque politician and physicist

- Born: 21 November 1953 (age 72); Monaco
- Education: Grenoble Institute of Technology
- Occupations: Nuclear physicist, civil servant

Patrice Cellario (born November 21, 1953) is a Monegasque nuclear physicist and civil servant. He served as Monaco's Interior Minister between 2015 and 2024.

== Early life ==
Patrice Cellario was born on November 21, 1953, in Monaco. He was educated in Monaco, attended prep school in Marseille, and graduated from the Grenoble Institute of Technology. He earned a PhD in Physics.

== Career ==
Cellario started his career at the Centre d'études nucléaires in Grenoble.

Cellario became a civil servant in Monaco in 1982, where he worked on telecommunications. He was engineering manager of the Stade Louis II from 1985 to 1988. He was the deputy director of Monaco Public Works from 1990 to 1992, and its director from 1992 to 1998. He then served as the director of Monaco's Environment, Urban Affairs and Construction from 1998 to 2000, followed by Monaco's Foresight and Studies on Urban Affairs from 2001 to 2008, and Monaco's Foresight, Urban Affairs and Mobility from 2008 to 2009. He served as the chief executive of Monaco's Department of the Interior from 2009 to 2015.

Cellario served as Monaco's Interior Minister from April 4, 2015, until his retirement in August 2024.

== Personal life ==
Cellario is married, and he has three children.
