= Corps des Sapeurs-Pompiers de Monaco =

Firefighting department of Monegasque military force

- Established: 1909
- Location: Monaco
- Services: firefighting, emergency services, civil defense
- Chef de Corps: Albert II, Prince of Monaco; Comdt. Maxime Yvrard
- Parent organization: Public Services (Monaco)
- Staff: 152 different ranks
- Website: Official Website

Corps des Sapeurs-Pompiers de Monaco is a firefighting and civil defense department of Monaco. The Department is responsible for fighting fires and risks of all kinds, providing personal assistance and protecting property on the territory of the Principality of Monaco and neighboring French municipalities (Cap d'Ail, Beausoleil and part of Roquebrune Cap Martin) on the basis of a 1970 bilateral Mutual Assistance Agreement.

== History ==
The Corps des Sapeurs-Pompiers celebrated its centenary in 2009. On 19 June 1909 Prince Albert I by sovereign ordinance No. 1778 created the Corps of firefighters. According to the sovereign ordinance the body of firefighters was responsible for providing firefighting and rescuing services and assisting in the maintenance of the public order.

Since 1949, the badge of the Corps des Sapeurs-Pompiers became a mark of recognition. The current badge was put into service in 1958 by Sovereign decision. Since 1950, the Unit has had a pennant symbolizing the pride and honor of the Corps but also its dedication to the Sovereign Prince and the Principality of Monaco.

In September 2020, Prince Albert II inaugurated a new Center for the Management of Events and the Conduct of Rescue Operations set up at the firefighters of Monaco.

The COVID-19 pandemic impacted the activity of Monaco's firefighters, showing a drop of more than 25% in the number of their interventions in 2020 compared to the same period in 2019.

== Organization ==
The Corps consists of 9 officers, 32 non-commissioned officers and 101 other ranks (with 25 civilian employees), providing fire, hazardous materials, rescue, and emergency medical services. The officers' ranks (in descending order of seniority) are: Colonel, Lieutenant-Colonel, Commandant, Captain, Lieutenant, and Sub-Lieutenant.

== Responsibility ==
Beyond firefighting duties, the Corps has an extensive civil defense brief. Its personnel are trained in the use of firearms, and the Corps has a central armory. Personnel are trained to handle chemical incidents, and have specialist chemical incident vehicles and equipment. They are also equipped with ambulances and personnel have paramedic training.

Alongside their profession as firefighters, they are also emeritus athletes, focusing a practice of sport in the service of a profession.

== Gallery ==
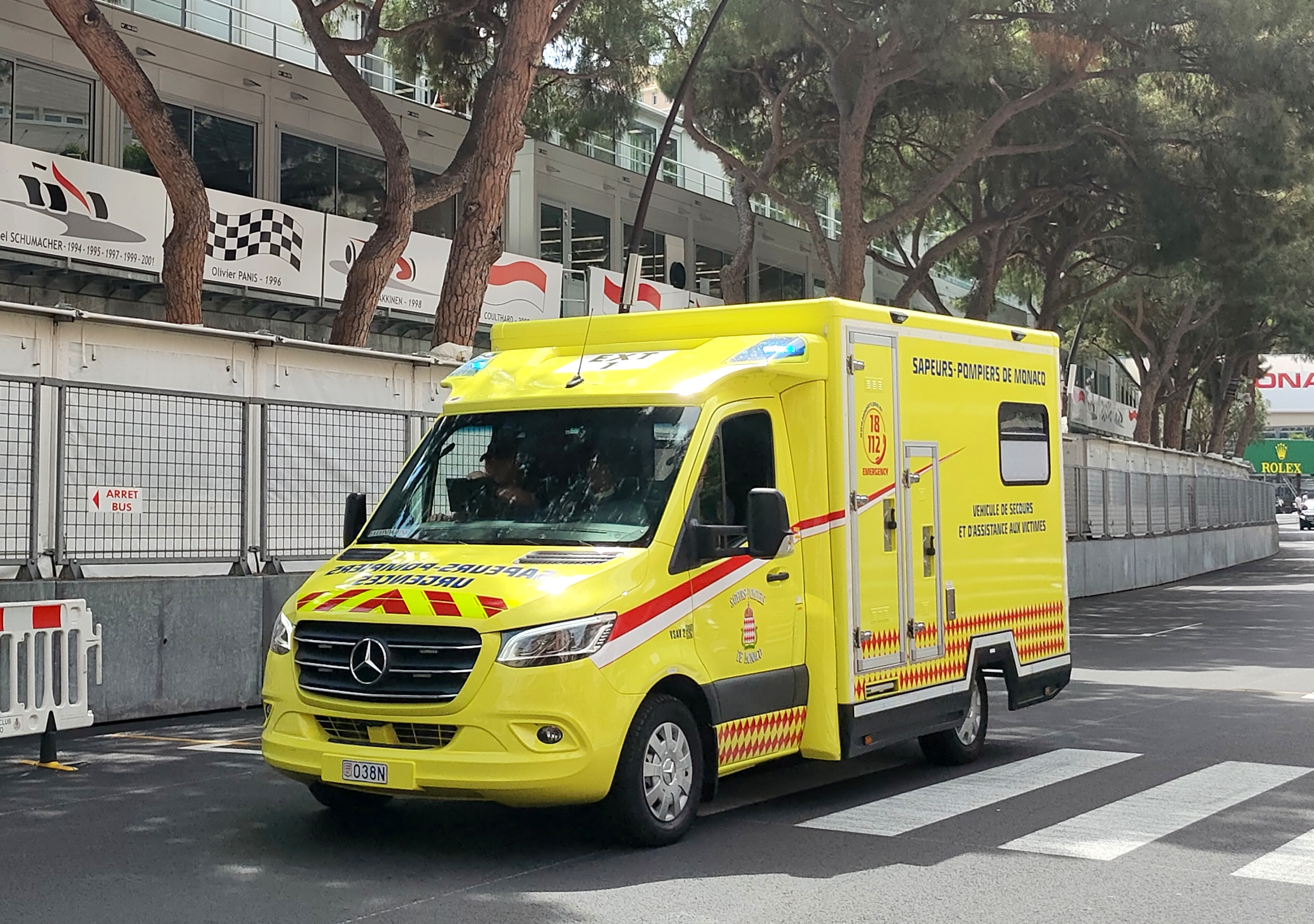
Mercedes-Benz Sprinter of the Corps des Sapeurs-Pompiers.

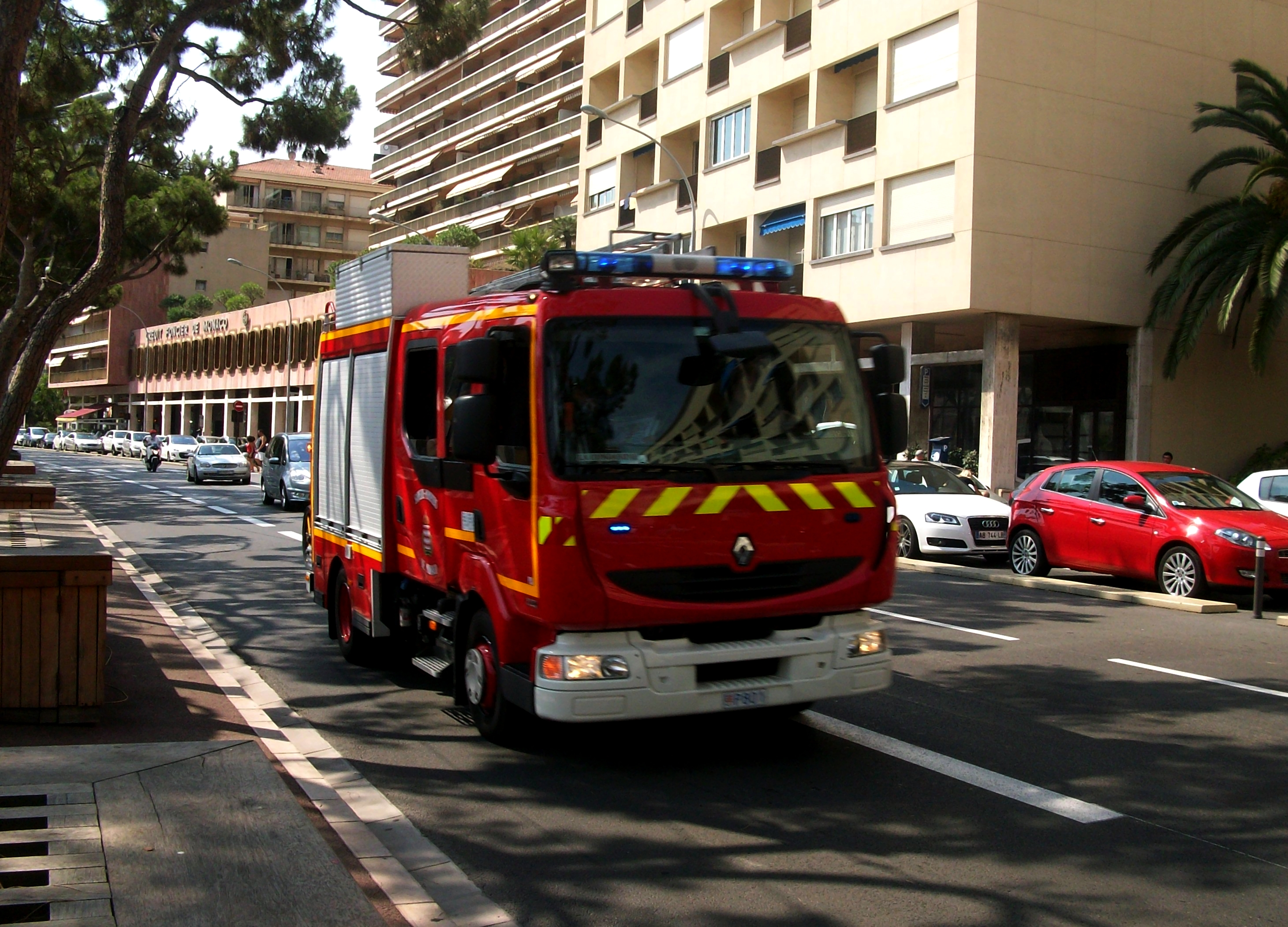
Renault Midlum fire truck of the Corps des Sapeurs-Pompiers.
