= Spasskaya Tower Military Music Festival and Tattoo =

Military music event in Red Square, Moscow

Spasskaya Tower Military Music Festival and Tattoo Международный военно-музыкальный фестиваль «Спасская башня»
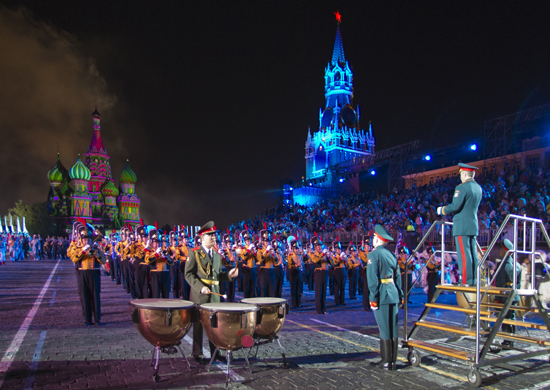
- The festival in 2011
- Genre: concert band, military, marching
- Dates: Late August Each Year
- Locations: Moscow, Russia
- Years active: 2007–present
- Website: spasstower.ru/en/

The Spasskaya Tower International Military Music Festival (Russian: Международный военно-музыкальный фестиваль «Спасская башня», romanized: Mezhdunarodny voyenno-muzykalny festival "Spasskaya bashnya") is an annual military music event and military tattoo held in Moscow on Red Square. Participating in the festival are Russian and foreign military bands, folk groups, and honor guard units of foreign countries. More than 40 countries have taken part in the festival since 2006. It is named after the world-famous Spasskaya Tower of the Moscow Kremlin. Its TV partner is TV Centre. The festival's motto is "To Revive Traditions and Preserve History".

In 2020, the directorate of the festival became a full-fledged member of the Asian Marching Band Confederation (AMBC).

== Timeline ==
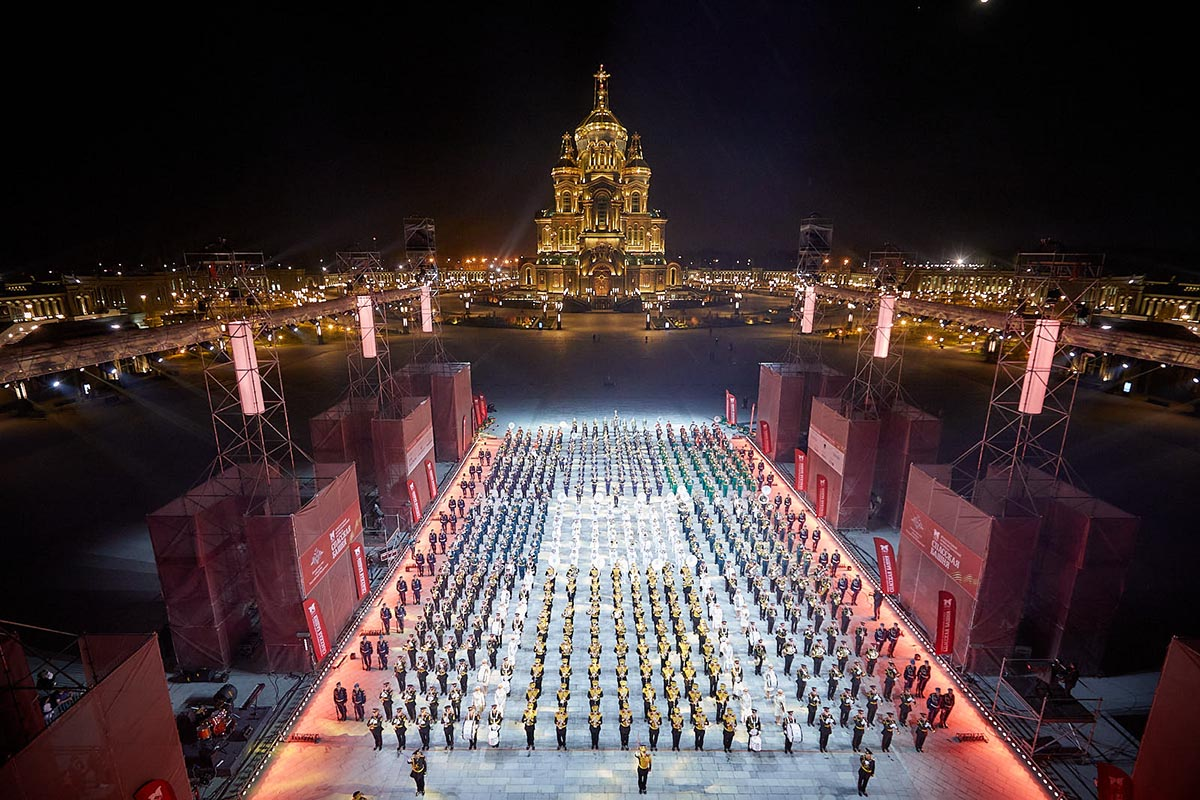
The 2020 ceremony.

The following is a timeline of the festival's history:

- 2007: It took place on Poklonnaya Hill and celebrated the Moscow City Day. The event was seen by more than 50,000 people.
- 2008: The event was referred to as the International Military Music Festival "The Kremlin Zorya". The Foreign and Commonwealth Office banned British Army bagpipers from travelling to event in protest of the 2008 Russo-Georgian War. The move was criticized by Brigadier Melville Jameson of the Edinburgh Military Tattoo and Vitaly Mironov of the Kremlin Zorya Foundation, with both accusing Foreign Secretary David Miliband of "playing politics" in a cultural event.
- 2014: 1,500 military musicians and honor guards from 10 countries took part in the festival. The theme of the festival marked the First World War centenary.
- 2015: The festival celebrated the 70th anniversary of the end of the Second World War.
- 2016: Attended by over a 1,000 musicians. Participating teams included those from Austria, Greece, the European Union, Italy, Mongolia, Singapore, Slovenia, Kazakhstan, Japan, Israel, Belarus, and Scotland. The tattoo began with a minute of silence for the 291 victims of the August 2016 Central Italy earthquake.
- 2017: The tattoo celebrated the 10th anniversary of the founding of the festival. It also honoured Lieutenant General Valery Khalilov, the musical director of the festival who died along with the entire Alexandrov Ensemble in the 2016 Russian Defence Ministry Tupolev Tu-154 crash. Over a thousand musicians from 40 young bands of the Central Federal District took part in the festival as part of a larger Children's Combined Band. Distinguished guests of honor included Belarusian Defence Minister Andrey Ravkov and his spouse, Chief Conductor in the Abkhazian Defence Ministry David Terzyan and Director of Bands for the Egyptian Armed Forces Major General Helmi Ahmed Suliman Khatab.
- 2018: The tattoo was attended by HRH Princess Stephanie of Monaco. The 2018 festival marked the 10th time that French singer Mireille Mathieu (who is also the festival's mascot) has appeared in the festival. It also marked the first time that military bands from the Commonwealth of Independent States (CIS) did not participate in the festival
- 2019: Individuals such as Georgian born People's Artist and singer Tamara Gverdtsiteli., as well as others such as Hibla Gerzmava and Anita Tsoi were among the vocal performers in the festival.
- 2020: The theme for the 2020 festival was "75 years - the end of the war", in honor of the diamond jubilee of the defeat of Nazi Germany. It was expected that the festival for this year be one that tells about the history of the military music in Russia. The bands of the anti-Hitler coalition were also invited to the festival. Due to the COVID-19, foreign bands were not able to participate in the festival, and later, it was announced that the festival was cancelled altogether, marking the first time since its establishment that the public event on Red Square had been cancelled. Instead of the normal program, it was announced that an online festival would take place on 6 September on the Cathedral Square of the Main Cathedral of the Russian Armed Forces, with over 12 musical units from the armed forces and other organizations performing, including a few first time participants. Virtual greetings were given by the Royal Thai Navy Band, the French Air Force Southwest Band, the Zürich City Police Band, and the PLA Band.
- 2021: The 2021 edition saw Till Lindemann of the German band Rammstein serve as headliner.
- 2023: Canceled due to the attacks in Western Russia during the Russian invasion of Ukraine.

== Bands in the Parks ==
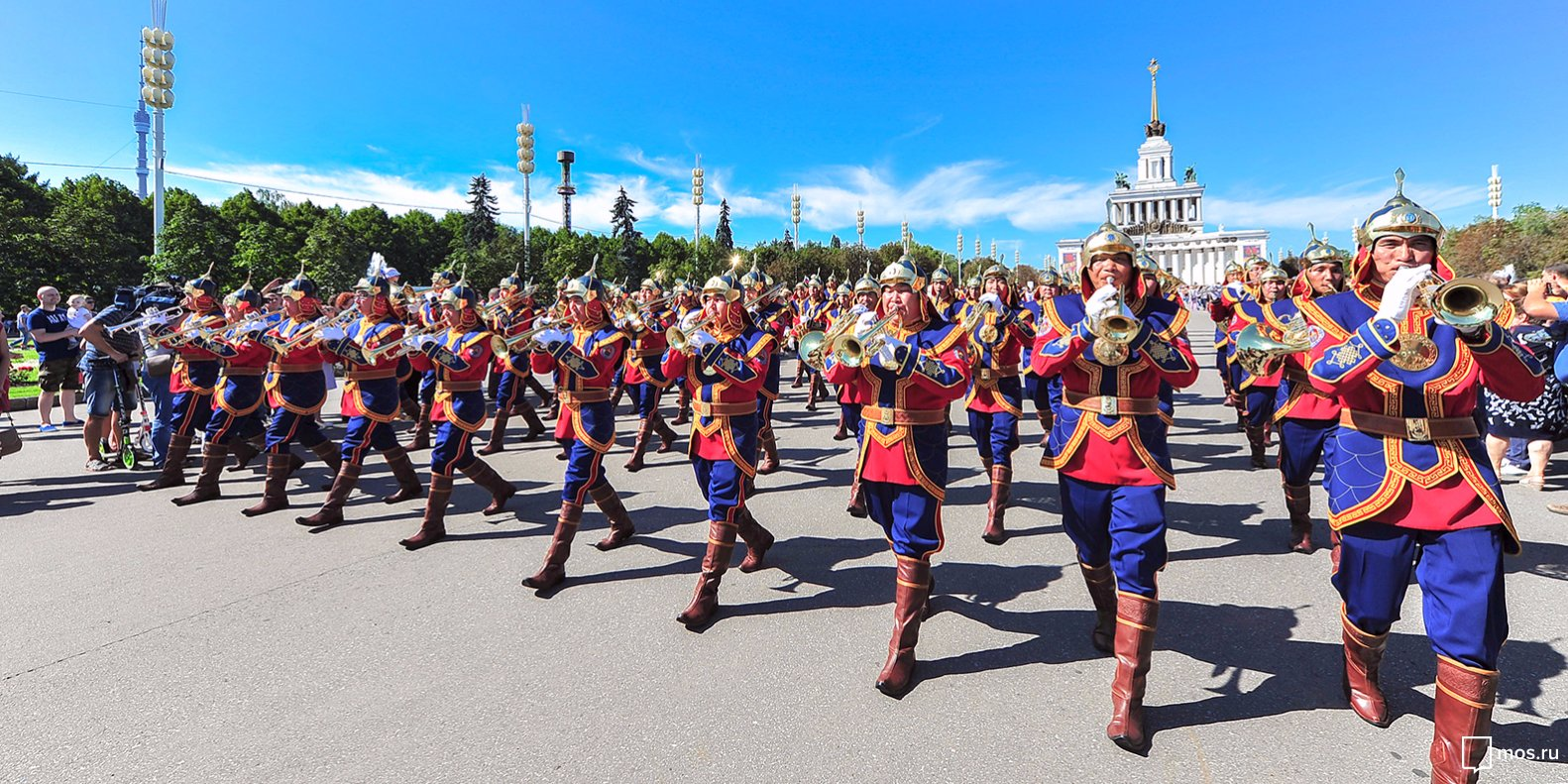
The Military Band of the General Staff of the Armed Forces of Mongolia in its traditional uniform on the VDNKh.

The Bands in the Parks is a program sponsored by Directorate of the Spasskaya Tower International Military Music Festival and is carried out from May to August in support of the Ministry of Defense of Russia and the Government of Moscow. The first of these performances took place at VDNKh in 2016 and was greeted with a standing ovation by Muscovites and guests of the capital. In the anniversary year a year later, the program of performances was expanded. The number of concerts and city venues involved in the project has increased.

== Performers ==
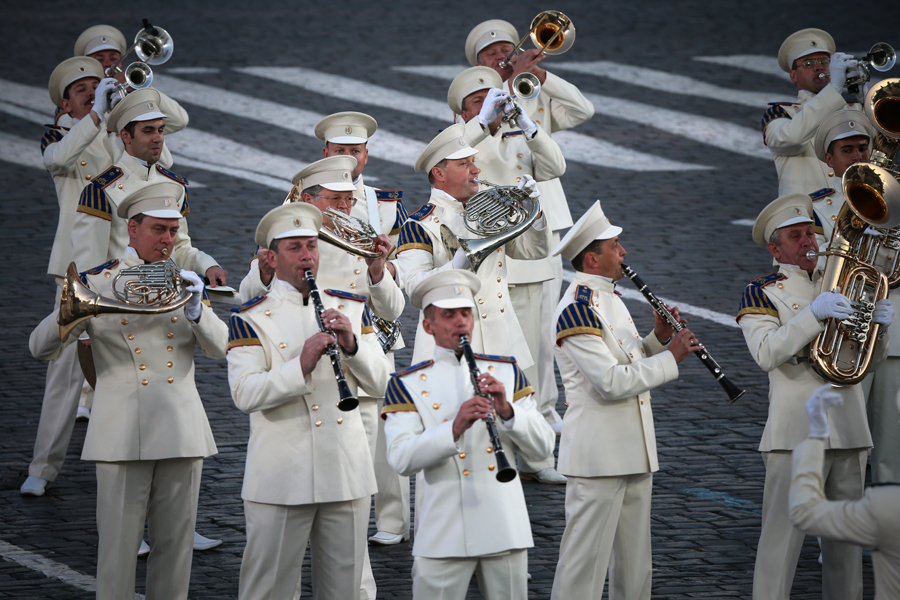
Presidential Band of the Russian Federation

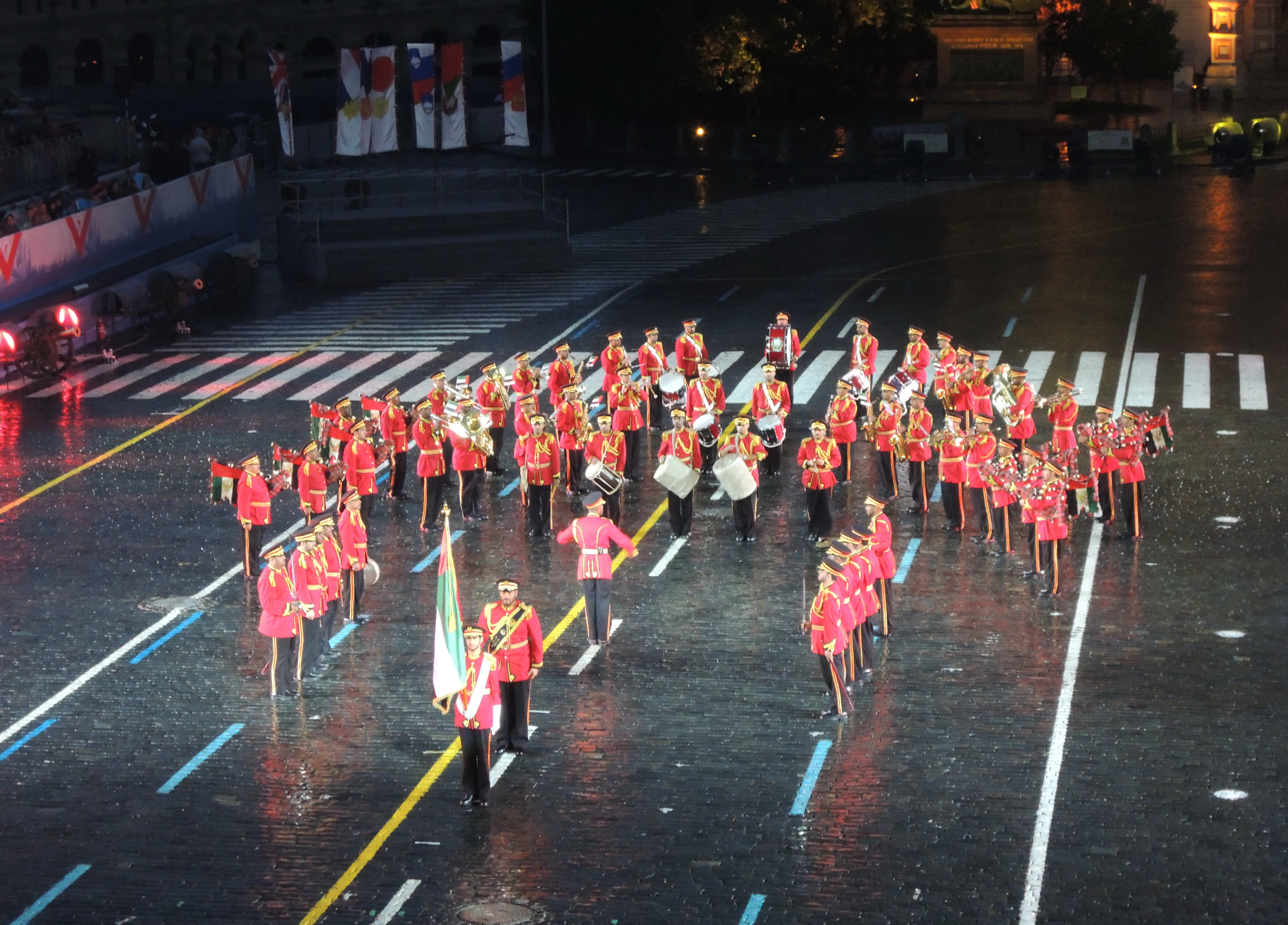
The Abu Dhabi Police Band

=== Foreign ===
Normally, each festival included a maximum of 12 countries, apart from Russia.

List of foreign participants in the festival
State	Unit	Branch/Service
Austria	Militärmusik Tirol (2013); Miltärmusik Niederösterreich (2016)	Bundesheer
Azerbaijan	Band of the Azerbaijan Higher Military Academy (2019); Song and Dance Ensemble of the Army Ideological and Hazi Aslanov Cultural Center (2019)	Armed Forces of Azerbaijan
Bahrain	Bahrain Police Band (2010)	Ministry of Interior
Belarus	Central Band of the Armed Forces of the Republic of Belarus (2013, 2016, 2017, 2019); Honor Guard of the Armed Forces of Belarus (2013, 2016, 2017, 2019)	Armed Forces of Belarus
Burkina Faso	Presidential Band of Burkina Faso (2025)	Burkina Faso Armed Forces
China	Central Military Band of the People's Liberation Army of China (2015, 2019)	People's Liberation Army
Denmark	Royal Life Guards Music Band	Danish Defence
Egypt	Egyptian Armed Forces Symphonic Band (2017)	Egyptian Armed Forces
Finland	Conscript Band of the Finnish Defence Forces (2013)	Finnish Defence Forces
France	French Army Signals Band (2010); French Foreign Legion Music Band (MLE) (2011); Musique de l'Arme Blindée Cavalerie (2012); Fanfare de l'Ecole d'Application de l'Artillerie (2012); Fanfare du 2e Régiment de Hussards (2012)	
Germany	Staff Band of the Bundeswehr	Bundeswehr
Greece	Hellenic Air Force Band (2011, 2012); Hellenic Air Force Technical NCO Academy Drill Team (2011, 2012)	
India	Indian Army Chief's Band (2009); Tri-Services Band (2017)	
Israel	Israel Police Orchestra (2010); Israel Defense Forces Orchestra (2016)	
Italy	Banda musicale dell'Arma dei Carabinieri (2012, 2017) Banda della Polizia Locale di Roma Capitale(2015); Band of the 11th Bersaglieri Regiment (2018); Alpine Brigade Tridentina Band (2019)	
Japan	Japan Ground Self-Defense Force Central Band (2019)	Japan Ground Self-Defense Force
Kazakhstan	Presidential Band of the State Security Service of the Republic of Kazakhstan (2007, 2009–10, 2012); Aibyn Presidential Regiment (2007, 2009–10, 2012); Honour Guard and Band of the National Guard of the Republic of Kazakhstan (2019)	
North Korea	Central Military Band of the Korean People's Army (2019)	Korean People's Army
South Korea	Hannuri Yeonhui Traditional Performing Arts Company (2019)	
Mexico	Representative Music Band of the Mexican Armed Forces (2015, 2021)	Mexican Armed Forces
Monaco	Prince's Band of Carabiniers (2018)	
Mongolia	Military Band of the General Staff of the Armed Forces of Mongolia (2015)	Armed Forces of Mongolia
Myanmar	Central Military Band of the Myanmar Armed Forces (2018)	Myanmar Armed Forces
Netherlands	Rotterdam Marine Band of the Royal Netherlands Navy (2013)	Royal Netherlands Navy
Netherlands	Bicycle Showband Crescendo (2018)	None (Civilian)
Norway	Tveit Union (2019)	
Oman	Omani Royal Guard Military Band (2018)	Omani Royal Guard
Pakistan	Pakistan Armed Forces Band (2011, 2015)	Pakistan Armed Forces
Poland	Representative Central Band of the Polish Armed Forces (2012)	Polish Armed Forces
Qatar	Qatar Armed Forces Band Regiment (2021)	Qatar Armed Forces
Qatar	Qatar Police Band (2021)	Qatar Police
Serbia	Nish Band of the Serbian Armed Forces (2014)	
Singapore	Singapore Armed Forces Band (2012); Singapore Police Force Band (2016); Singapore Police Force Women's Pipes and Drums (2016)	
Slovenia	Slovene Military Orchestra (2013); KUD Pošta Maribor Brass Band (2015)	
Sri Lanka	Sri Lankan Military Band (2018)	
Switzerland	Top Secret Drum Corps (2011, 2017); Vieux-Grenadiers Company (2014, 2018)	
Tajikistan	Military Brass Band of the Commandant Regiment of the Ministry of Defense of Tajikistan (2010)	
Turkey	Harmonic Band of the Turkish Armed Forces (2019)	
UAE	Abu Dhabi Police Band (2013)	
UK	Royal Artillery Band (2011); 19th Regiment Royal Artillery Pipes and Drums (2011); Brentwood Imperial Youth Band (2018)	
US	United States Army Europe Band and Chorus (2010)	
Uzbekistan	Band of the Ministry of Defense of the Republic of Uzbekistan (2017)	
Venezuela	Concert Band of the National Bolivarian Armed Forces of Venezuela General Headquarters (2022)	National Bolivarian Armed Forces of Venezuela

Other low-level participants have included the Republican Specialized Academic Lyceum of Music of the Uzbekistan National Guard and the National Presidential Band of Ukraine.

=== Russian performers ===
- Honour Guard and Cavalry Escort of the Kremlin Regiment (2007–Present)
- Presidential Band of the Russian Federation (2007–Present)
- Central Military Band of the Ministry of Defense of Russia (2007–Present)
- Central Navy Band of Russia (2007–Present)
- Band of the Moscow Military Music College (2007–Present)
- Band of the Dzerzhinsky Division (2009, 2010, 2011, 2012, 2013, 2015, 2016, 2017, 2018, 2019)
- Special Exemplary Military Band of the Guard of Honor Battalion of Russia (2011–Present)
- Band of the 154th Preobrazhensky Regiment (2012–Present)
- Girls Corps of Drums, Boarding School for Girls, Ministry of Defense of Russia (2012-2018)
- Central Band of the Border Guard Service of the Federal Security Service of Russia (2018)
- Military Band of the Southern Military District (2019)
- Combined Band and Song and Dance Company of the Russian Airborne Forces (2020)
- Military Band of the Krasnodar Region Main Department of the National Guard (2020)
- Band of the S.M. Kirov Military Medical Academy
- Central Exemplary Band of the Ministry of Emergency Situations of Russia (2020)
- Band of GBOU School No. 1770, Moscow (2020)

== Notable guests ==
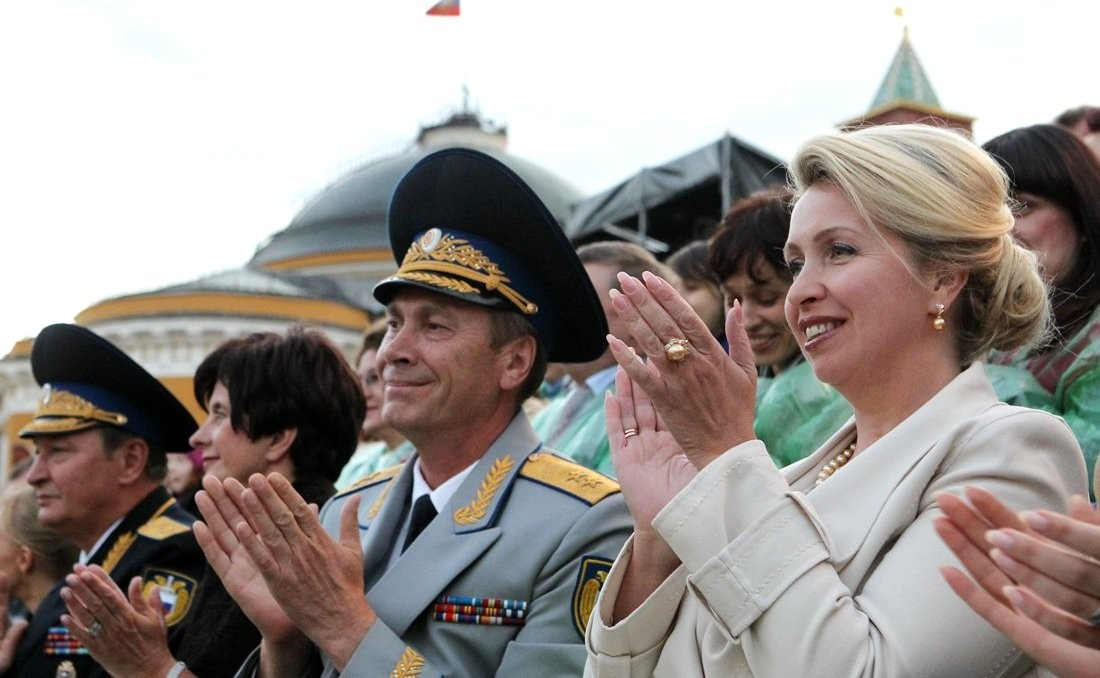
Sergey Khlebnikov and Svetlana Medvedeva at the 2011 festival.

- Svetlana Medvedeva, 3rd First Lady of Russia
- Army General Valery Gerasimov, Chief of the General Staff
- General Vladimir Kolokoltsev, Minister of Internal Affairs
- Belarusian Defence Minister Andrei Ravkov and his wife Natalia
- Princess Stéphanie of Monaco
- Lieutenant Colonel Abdul Wahab Khan, Pakistan Army School of Music
- Hamad bin Isa al-Khalifa, King of Bahrain
- Lieutenant General Christos Vaitsis, Chief of the Hellenic Air Force General Staff

== Protocol ==
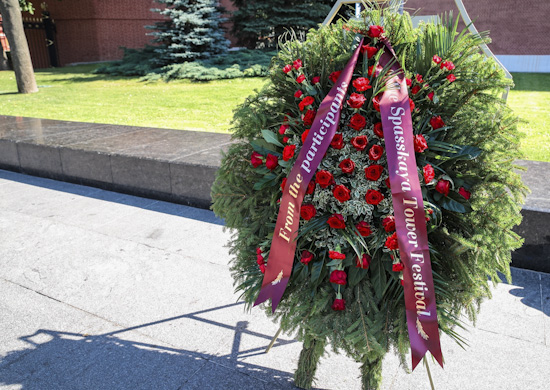
A wreath laid by the directorate of the festival.

The President of Russia in his/her position as Supreme Commander-in-Chief of the Russian Armed Forces usually delivers a message of congratulations to the organizers and participants of the festival. Greetings are also given by the Russian Defence Minister and the Mayor of Moscow. The day before the festival's opening ceremony, the directors of the participating bands lay wreaths at the Tomb of the Unknown Soldier in Alexander Garden. The festival usually coincides with Moscow's City Day, which means that some of the participating bands take part in the procession along Tverskaya Street.

=== Directors ===
The musical director of the festival is the senior director of music of the Military Band Service of the Armed Forces of Russia.

- Lieutenant General Valery Khalilov (2006–2016)
- Major General Timofey Mayakin (2016–Present)

Roman Markholia served as producer-director of the festival in 2010, 2011 and 2012.

=== Award winners ===
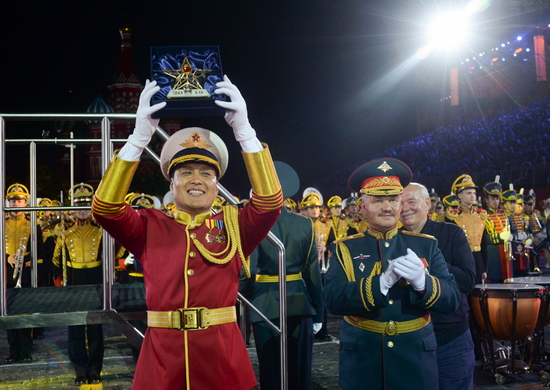
The band conductor of the Central Military Band of the People's Liberation Army of China, Senior Colonel Liu Xinbo, receiving an award from Timofey Mayakin at the 2019 tattoo.

Year	Russian	Foreign
2018	Band of the Moscow Military Music College	Bicycle Showband Crescendo
2019	Central Military Band of the Ministry of Defense of Russia	Central Military Band of the People's Liberation Army of China

== Public Council ==
The public council is the organizing committee of the festival.

== Gallery ==
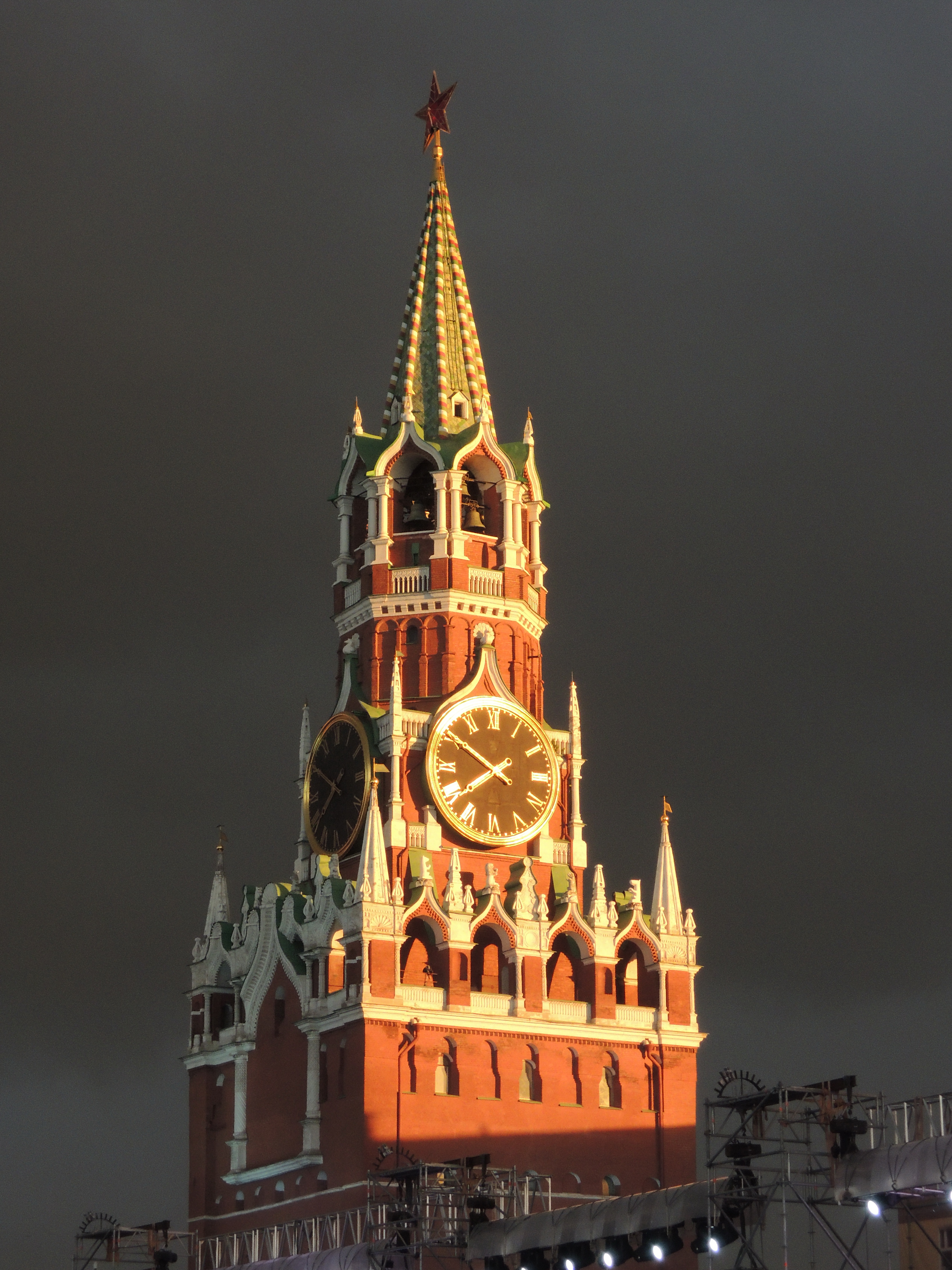
Spasskaya Tower

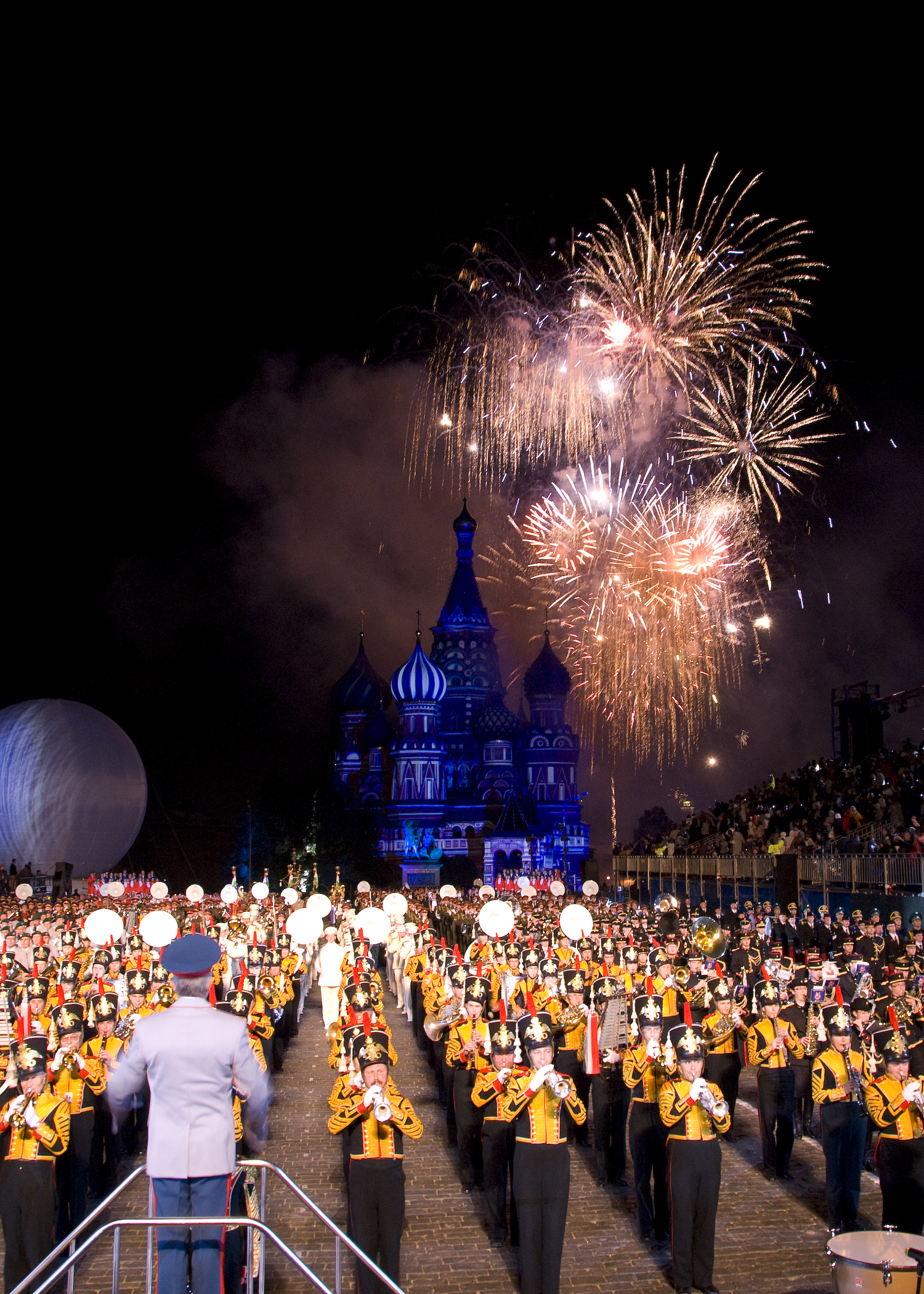
The Grand Finale of the tattoo in 2010

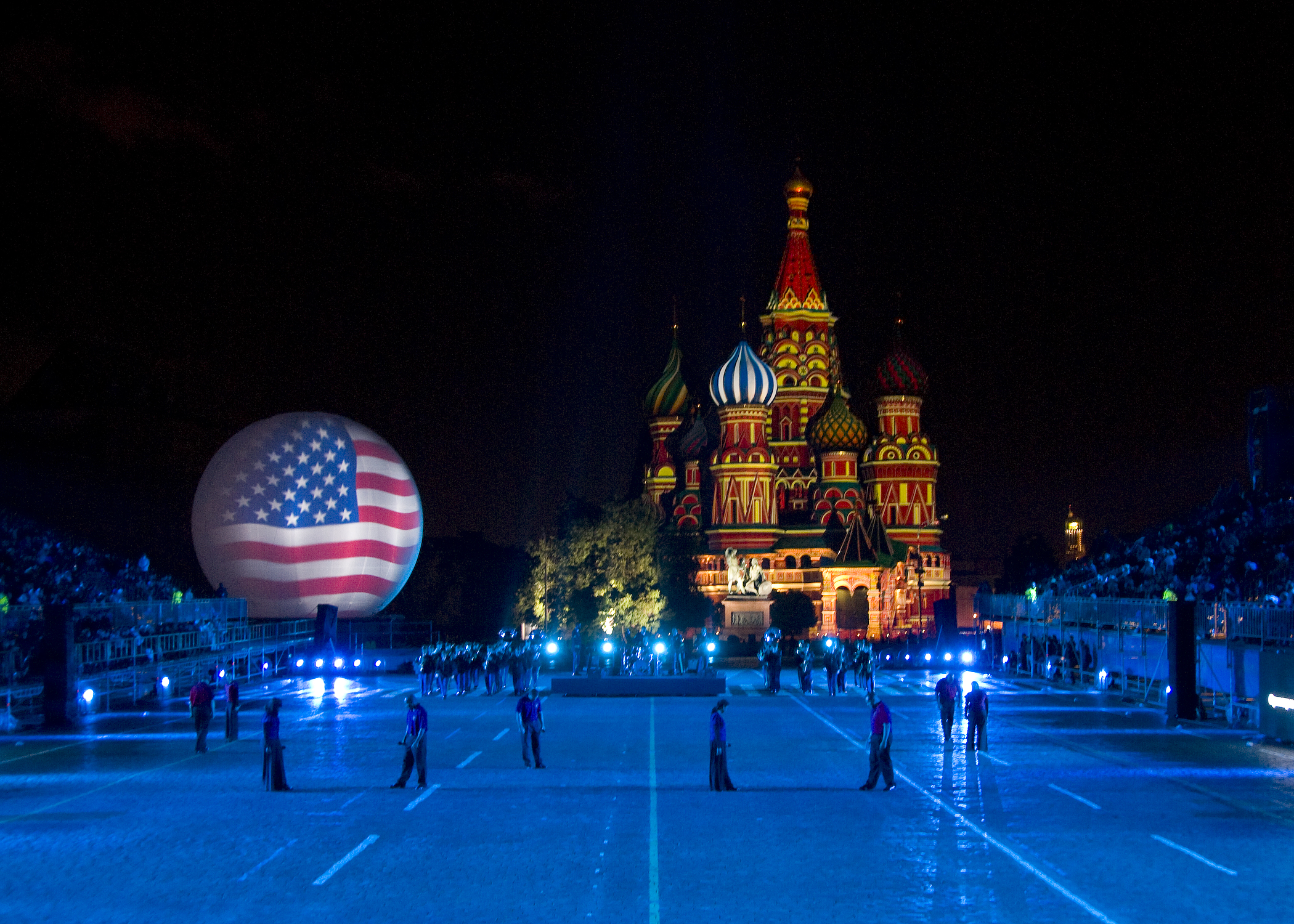
The United States Army Europe Band and Chorus

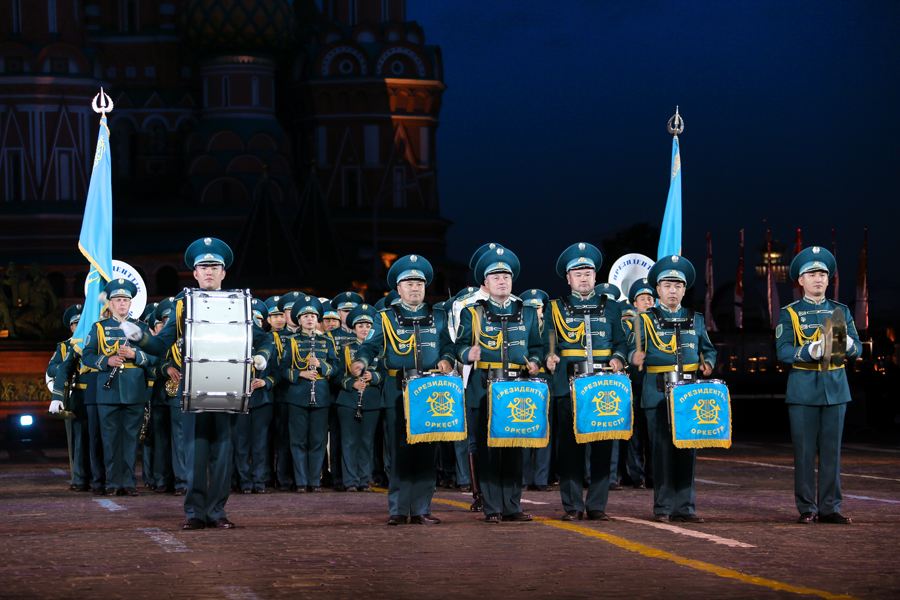
Band of the Republican Guard of Kazakhstan

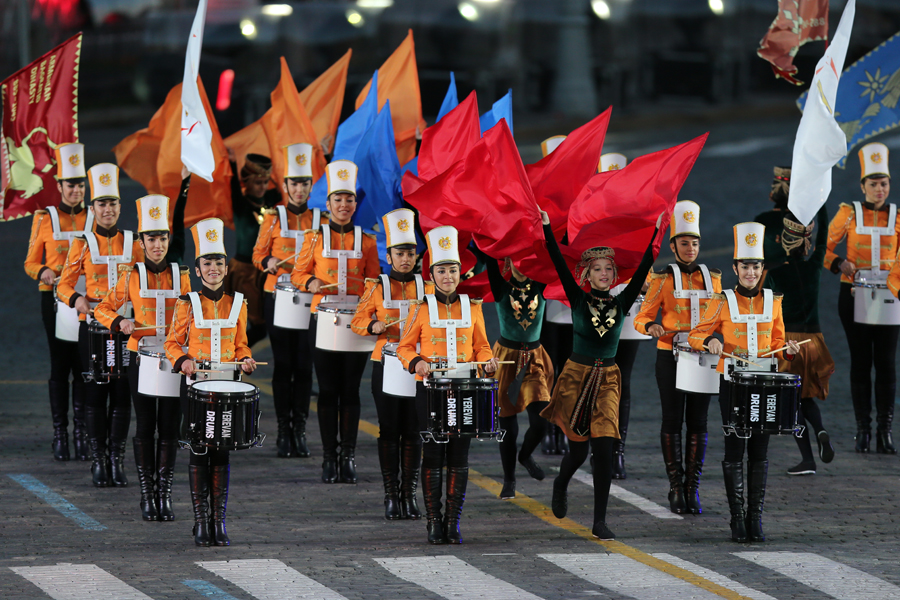
Yerevan Drums

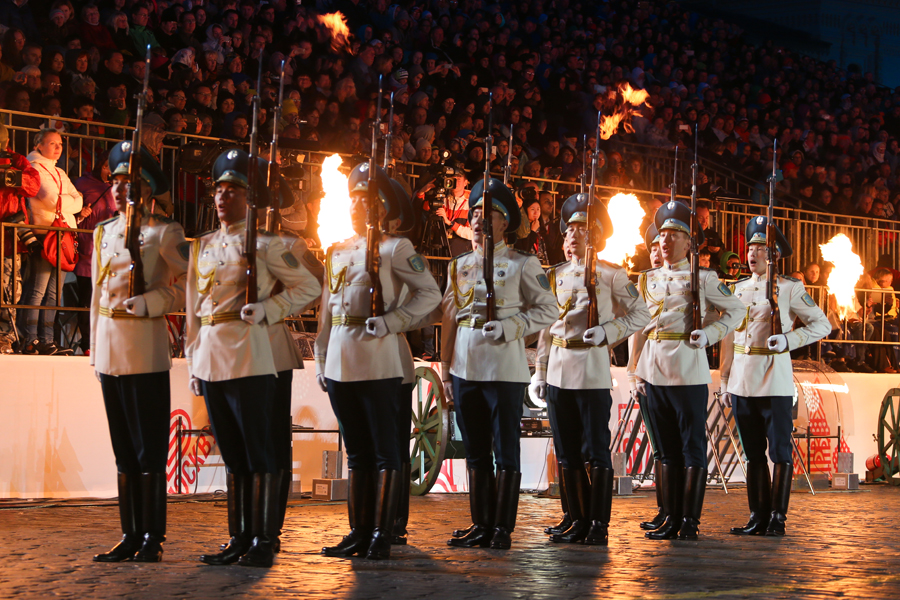
The Aibyn Presidential Regiment

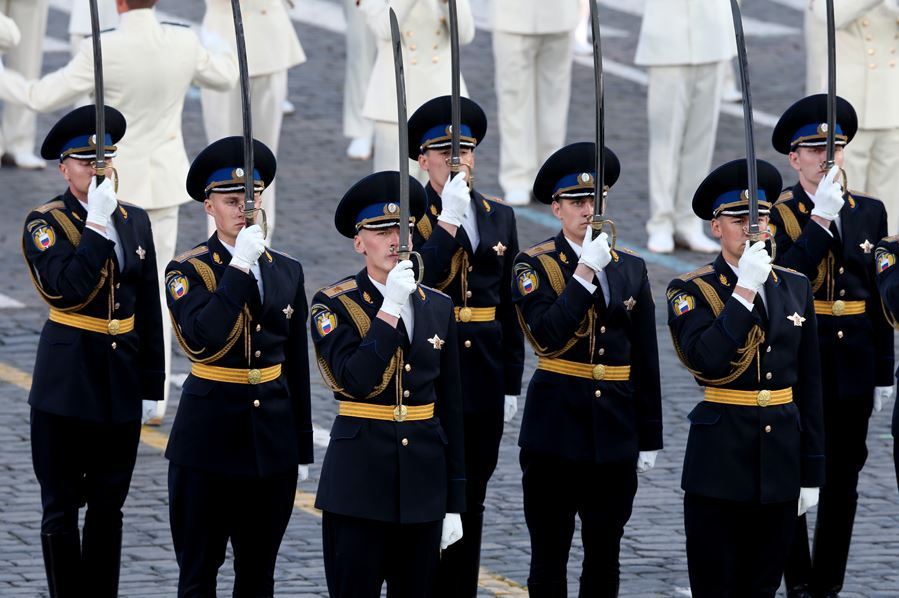
A sabre drill team from the Kremlin Regiment

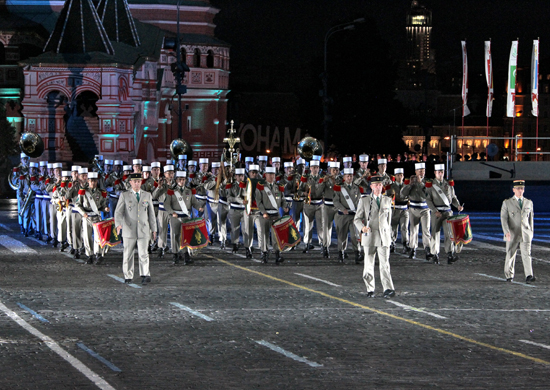
The French Foreign Legion Music Band

== Videos ==
- 9th Spasskaya Tower Military Music Festival
- 10th Spasskaya Tower Military Music Festival
- 12th Spasskaya Tower Military Music Festival
- 13th Spasskaya Tower Military Music Festival
- 14th Spasskaya Tower Military Music Festival
- Russia: Spasskaya Tower Military Music Festival rehearsals take place on Red Square
- Военные оркестры в парках 2019 (Парк Фили)
- Russia: Final rehearsals for 11th Spasskaya Tower Military Music Festival get underway
- Band of the Azerbaijan Higher Military School
