= Ghosts (play) =

1882 play written by Henrik Ibsen

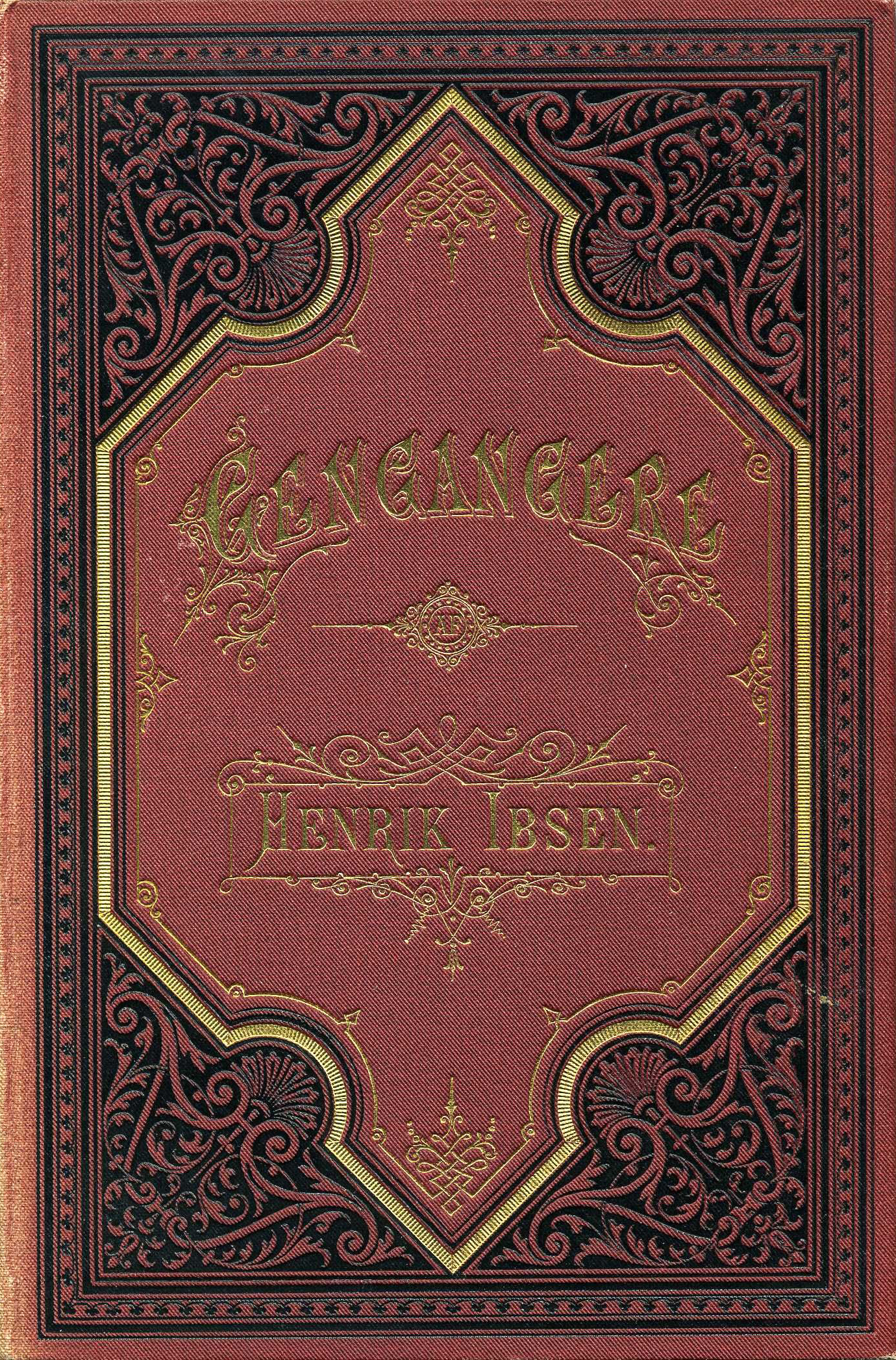
- The first edition of Ghosts by Henrik Ibsen, 1881
- Original language: Danish
- Written by: Henrik Ibsen
- Characters: Mrs. Helen Alving; Oswald Alving; Pastor Manders; Jacob Engstrand; Regina Engstrand
- Subject: Morality
- Genre: Naturalistic / realistic problem play
- Setting: The country home of the Alving family beside one of the large fjords in Western Norway

Premiere
- Date: 20 May 1882
- Place: Aurora Turner Hall in Chicago, Illinois

Ghosts (Danish: Gengangere) is a play by the Norwegian playwright Henrik Ibsen. It was written in Danish and published in 1881, and first staged in 1882 in Chicago, Illinois, US, performed in Danish.

Like many of Ibsen's plays, Ghosts is a scathing commentary on 19th-century morality. Because of its subject matter, which includes religion, venereal disease, incest, and euthanasia, it immediately generated strong controversy and adverse criticism.

Since then, the play has come to be considered a "great play" that historically holds a position of "immense importance". Theater critic Maurice Valency wrote in 1963, "From the standpoint of modern tragedy Ghosts strikes off in a new direction.... Regular tragedy dealt mainly with the unhappy consequences of breaking the moral code. Ghosts, on the contrary, deals with the consequences of not breaking it."

Ibsen disliked the English translator William Archer's use of the word "Ghosts" as the play's title, as the Danish or Norwegian Gengangere would be more accurately translated as "The Revenants", which literally means "The Ones Who Return".

== Characters ==
- Mrs. Helen Alving – a widow
- Oswald Alving – her son, a painter
- Pastor Manders – an old friend of Helen Alving
- Jacob Engstrand – a carpenter
- Regina Engstrand – Mrs. Alving's maid

Notable productions

Characters	Broadway revival	West End revival	Off-Broadway revival
Characters	1982	2013	2025
Mrs. Helen Alving	Liv Ullmann	Lesley Manville	Lily Rabe
Oswald Alving	Kevin Spacey	Jack Lowden	Levon Hawke
Pastor Manders	John Neville	Will Keen	Billy Crudup
Jacob Engstrand	Edward Binns	Brian McCardie	Hamish Linklater
Regina Engstrand	Jane Murray	Charlene McKenna	Ella Beatty

== Summary ==
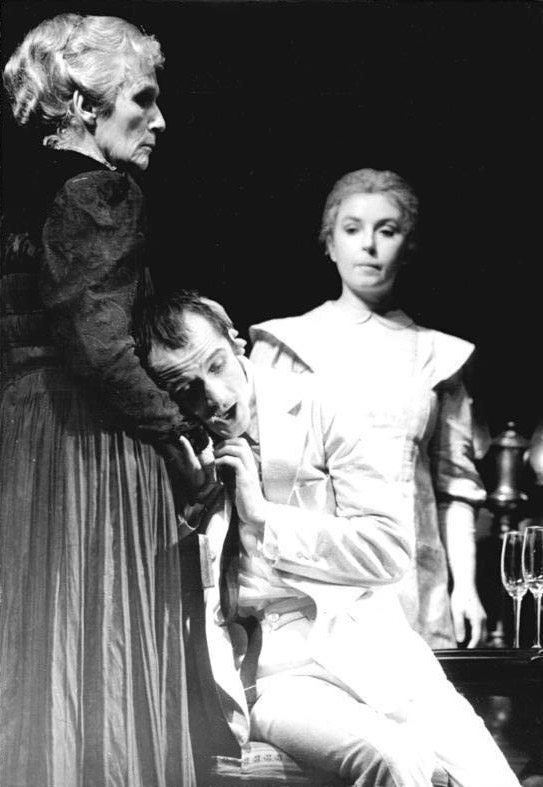
A performance of Ghosts in East Berlin, 1983, with Inge Keller, Ulrich Mühe, and Simone von Zglinicki

Helen Alving is about to dedicate an orphanage, which she has built in memory of her late husband, Captain Alving. Despite her husband's affairs, Mrs. Alving stayed with him to protect her son Oswald from the taint of scandal and for fear of being shunned by the community.

In the course of the play, she discovers that Oswald (whom she had sent away to avoid his being corrupted by his father) is suffering from syphilis, which she believes he inherited from his father. (Note: The play implies that Oswald inherited syphilis from his father. However syphilis is not genetically passed down from a parent in the genetic code, but is instead caused by a bacterium and is either transmitted sexually or congenitally transmitted to a child from the birth mother. In 2013 director Richard Eyre wrote in The Guardian, "It's often said that Ibsen misunderstood the pathology of syphilis, that he thought – as Oswald is told by his doctor in Ghosts – that it was a hereditary disease passed by father to son. It's much more probable, given that he had friends in Rome who were scientists (including the botanist JP Jacobsen, who translated Darwin into Norwegian), that he knew that the disease is passed on through sexual contact, and that pregnant women can pass it to the babies they are carrying. He knew too that it's possible for a woman to be a carrier without being aware of it, and perhaps he wants us to believe that Helen knows she is a carrier. It's a matter of interpretation." (Dr. Rank in Ibsen's play A Doll's House is another character who claims he inherited syphilis from his father.)) She also discovers that Oswald has fallen in love with her maid Regina Engstrand, who is revealed to be the illegitimate daughter of Captain Alving and is therefore Oswald's half-sister.

A sub-plot involves a carpenter, Jacob Engstrand, who married Regina's mother when she was already pregnant. He regards Regina as his own daughter. He is unaware (or pretends) that Captain Alving was Regina's father. Having recently completed his work building Mrs. Alving's orphanage, Engstrand announces his ambition to open a hostel for seafarers. He tries to persuade Regina to leave Mrs. Alving and help him run the hostel, but she refuses. The night before the orphanage is due to open, Engstrand asks Pastor Manders to hold a prayer-meeting there. Later that night, the orphanage burns down. Earlier, Manders had persuaded Mrs. Alving not to insure the orphanage, as to do so would imply a lack of faith in divine providence. Engstrand says the blaze was caused by Manders' carelessness with a candle and offers to take the blame, which Manders readily accepts. Manders in turn offers to support Engstrand's hostel.

When Regina and Oswald's sibling relationship is exposed, Regina departs, leaving Oswald in anguish. He asks his mother to help him avoid the late stages of syphilis with a fatal morphine overdose. She agrees, but only if it becomes necessary. The play concludes with Mrs. Alving having to confront the decision of whether or not to euthanize her son in accordance with his wishes.

== Inception ==
As with his other plays, Henrik Ibsen wrote Ghosts in Danish, the common written language of Denmark and Norway at the time. The original title, in both Danish and Norwegian, is Gengangere, which can be literally translated as "again walkers", "ones who return", or "revenants". It has a double meaning of both "ghosts" and "events that repeat themselves" which the English title Ghosts fails to capture.

Ibsen wrote Ghosts during the autumn of 1881 and published it that December. As early as November 1880, when he was living in Rome, he had been meditating on a new play to follow A Doll's House. When he went to Sorrento, in the summer of 1881, he was hard at work upon it. He finished it by the end of November 1881 and published it in Copenhagen on 13 December 1881.

== Reception ==
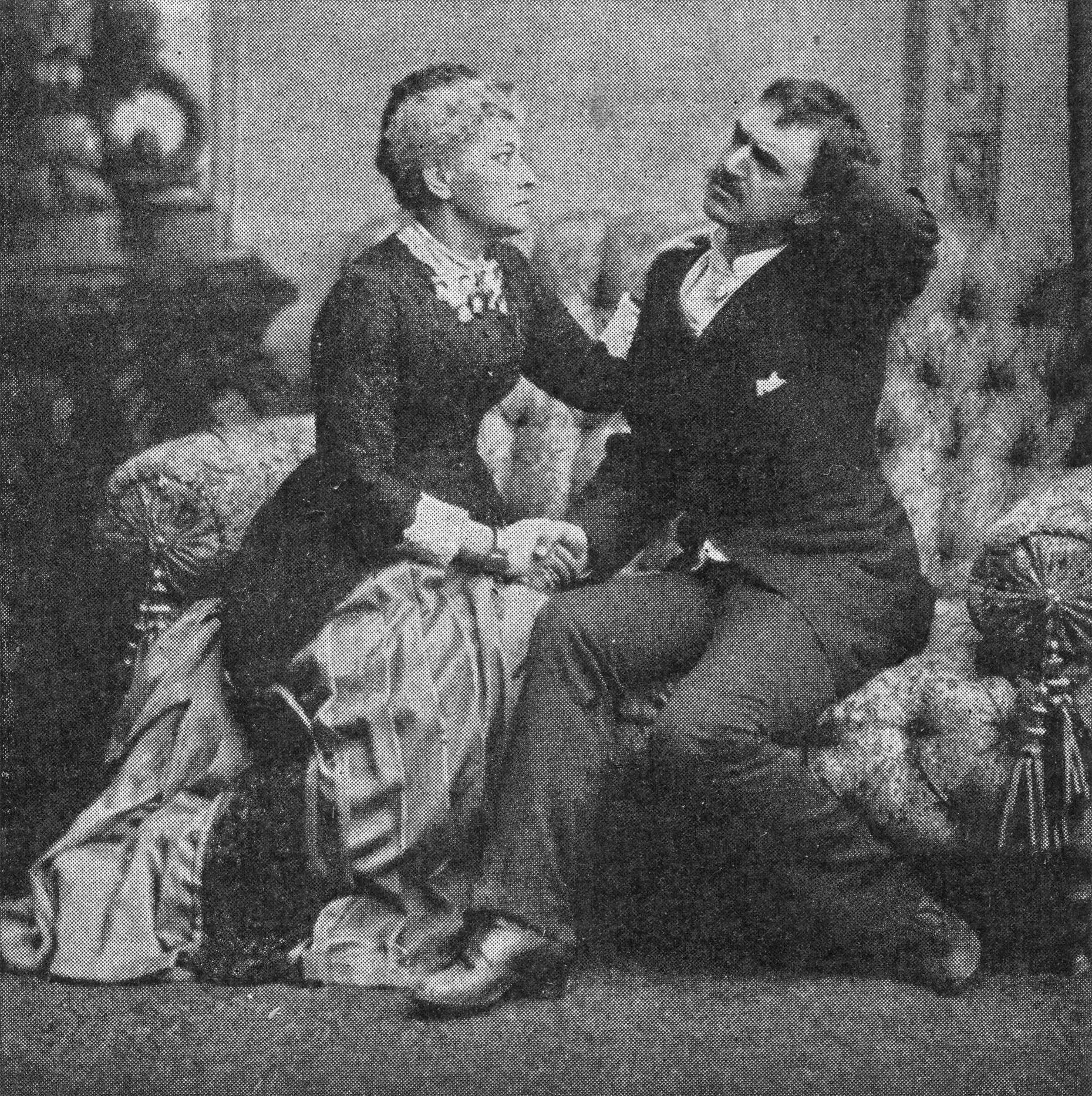
Charlotta Raa-Winterhjelm as Mrs. Alving and August Lindberg as Osvald in the 1883 Swedish performance.

Ghosts was published in Copenhagen on 13 December 1881 in an edition of 10,000 copies. It caused a firestorm of public outcry, and most of the 10,000 copies did not sell, which was financially a severe blow for Ibsen. A subsequent print run of the text was not published until 1894.

The play was initially sent to a number of Nordic theaters, including the Royal Theater in Copenhagen, the Nya Teatern and Dramaten in Stockholm, and the Christiania Theater, but all of them rejected the play. In the early 1880s, the play was generally rejected by all major European playhouses, including those in Norway.

Upon the publication of the text, Ibsen's contemporaries found the play shocking and indecent and disliked its frank treatment of the forbidden topic of venereal disease. At the time, the mere mention of venereal disease was scandalous, and to show that a person who followed society's ideals of morality was at risk from her own husband was considered beyond the pale. According to Richard Eyre, "There was an outcry of indignation against the attack on religion, the defence of free love, the mention of incest and syphilis."

== Production history ==
=== 1882–1899 ===
Ghosts premiered in May 1882 in the United States, produced in Danish for Scandinavian immigrants by a Danish-Norwegian cast in Chicago, at the Aurora Turner Hall. The first performance in Sweden was at Helsingborg on 22 August 1883. Ghosts was produced in Norway in October 1883, and it received good reviews. It was produced independently in September 1889 at Berlin's Die Freie Bühne.

The play achieved a single private London performance on 13 March 1891 at the Royalty Theatre, which was its English-language premiere. The issue of Lord Chamberlain's Office censorship, because of the subject matter of illegitimate children and sexually transmitted disease, was avoided by the formation of a subscription-only Independent Theatre Society to produce the play. Its members included playwright George Bernard Shaw and authors Thomas Hardy and Henry James. The play was reviled in the press. In a typical review at the time, The Daily Telegraph referred to it as "Ibsen's positively abominable play entitled Ghosts.... An open drain: a loathsome sore unbandaged; a dirty act done publicly.... A lazar house with all its doors and windows open ... Gross, almost putrid indecorum.... Literary carrion.... Crapulous stuff".

In 1898 when Ibsen was presented to King Oscar II of Sweden and Norway, at a dinner in Ibsen's honour, the King told Ibsen that Ghosts was not a good play. After a pause, Ibsen exploded, "Your Majesty, I had to write Ghosts!" Ghosts had its first New York City production, and its first English-language production in the U.S., on Broadway on 5 January 1894 at the Berkeley Lyceum Theatre. It was produced again in 1899 by the New York Independent Theatre with Mary Shaw as Mrs. Alving.

Russian actress Alla Nazimova, with Paul Orleneff, gave a notable production of Ghosts in a small room on the Lower East Side in 1895–96. When Nazimova had been a student in Russia, she had wanted to "play Regina for my graduation piece at the dramatic school at Moscow, but they would not let me. Ghosts was at that time prohibited by the censor, because it reflects on the Church."

=== 1900–present ===
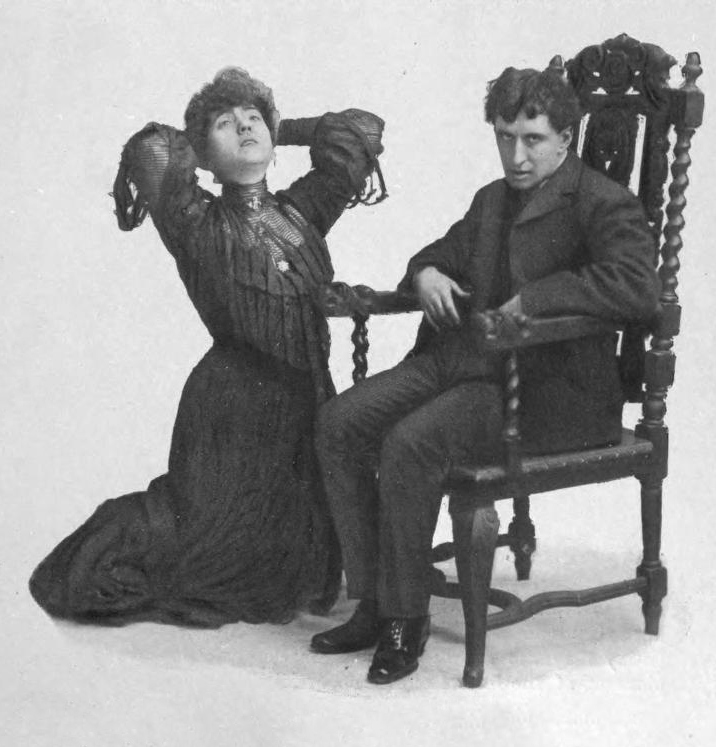
Mary Shaw and Frederick Lewis in a 1903 Broadway production

The play later received many European performances. In its 1906 production in Berlin, the Norwegian artist Edvard Munch was commissioned to create the original stage designs. On 4 May 1962, the play was performed in the Theatre Sala Chopin in Mexico City with Mexican actress and Hollywood star Dolores del Río in the role of Mrs. Alving.

A Broadway revival of Ghosts ran from 30 August to 2 October 1982 at the Brooks Atkinson Theater in New York City, and starred Kevin Spacey as Oswald in his Broadway debut. The cast included Edward Binns, John Neville (who also directed the production) as Pastor Manders, Liv Ullmann as Mrs. Alving, and Jane Murray as Regina. The production opened originally at the Eisenhower Theater in Washington's Kennedy Center on July 19, 1982.

A touring UK production, designed by Simon Higlett and inspired by Edvard Munch's original stage designs for a 1906 staging in Berlin, began performances at Rose Theatre Kingston in the United Kingdom on 19 September 2013, prior to an official opening on 25 September. Directed by Stephen Unwin, the cast included Patrick Drury as Pastor Manders, Florence Hall as Regina, Kelly Hunter as Mrs Alving, and Mark Quartley as Oswald.

An award-winning 2013–14 London production opened at the Almeida Theatre on 26 September 2013 and transferred to the West End at Trafalgar Studios on 9 December, running until 22 March 2014. Adapted and directed by Richard Eyre, it featured Lesley Manville, Jack Lowden, Will Keen, Charlene McKenna, and Brian McCardie. Manville and Lowden won Olivier Awards for their performances; Manville also won the Critics' Circle Theatre Award for Best Actress, and Lowden also won the Ian Charleson Award. Eyre won the Evening Standard Award for Best Director. The production also won the Olivier Award for Best Revival, and received Olivier Award nominations for Best Director and Best Lighting Design. A filmed February 2014 performance of the production screened in more than 275 UK and Irish cinemas on 26 June 2014. The entire filmed performance can be viewed online. The production was also adapted for radio by director Richard Eyre, broadcast on BBC Radio 3 on 15 December 2013 and re-broadcast on 26 April 2015. Eyre's production was presented at the Brooklyn Academy of Music in Spring 2015, where Ben Brantley in The New York Times called it "possibly the best Ghosts you'll ever see".

In 2014 a Chinese-Norwegian co-production entitled Ghosts 2.0 was produced in Beijing, commissioned by Ibsen International and directed by Wang Chong, who had started the Chinese New Wave Theater Movement. The multimedia performance used four cameras on the stage, giving the audience different perspectives.

In 2025, a production at Lincoln Center Theater's Mitzi E. Newhouse premiered with Lily Rabe, Billy Crudup, Ella Beatty, and Levon Hawke, Hamish Linklater. The production received a Drama League Award nomination for Outstanding Revival of a Play, along with Rabe receiving a nomination for Distinguished Performance.

== Film and television ==
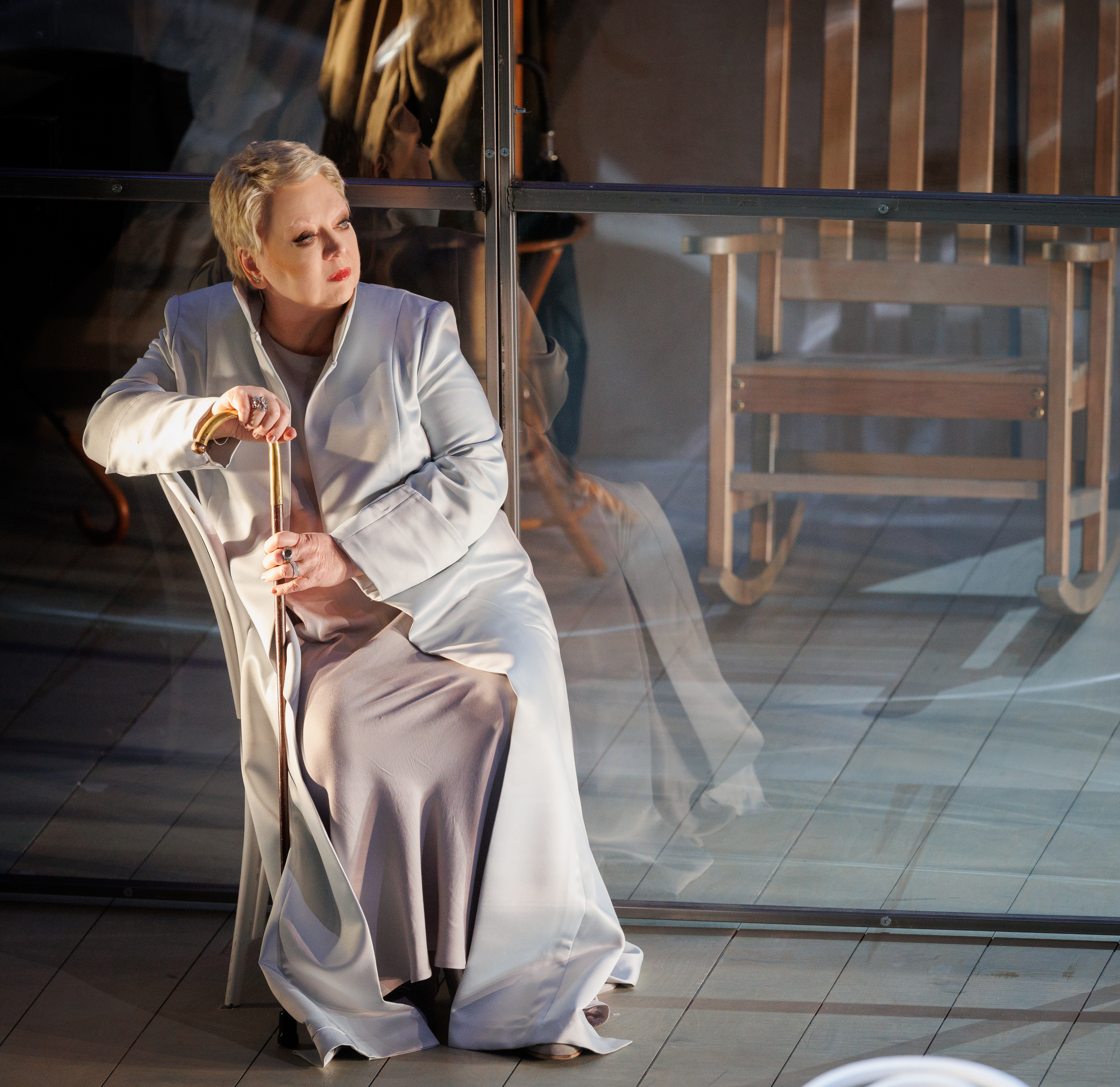
Svetlana Kryuchkova in Tovstonogov Bolshoi Drama Theater (Henrik Ibsen's Ghosts, director Roman Markholia, 2022)

Ghosts has been filmed, and adapted for film and television, numerous times in various languages. It was adapted at least three times for silent films. In 1915, George Nichols directed a film of the same name for producer D. W. Griffith. Mary Alden and Henry B. Walthall starred. Also in 1915, it was filmed in Russia, directed and adapted by Vladimir Gardin. In 1918, the Italian production company Milano Films released an adaptation titled Gli spettri, starring Ermete Zacconi and his wife Ines Cristina Zacconi.

In 1987 it was televised on the BBC, directed by Elijah Moshinsky and featuring Judi Dench as Mrs. Alving, Kenneth Branagh as Oswald, Michael Gambon as Pastor Manders, and Natasha Richardson as Regina. In 2014, Richard Eyre's award-winning London stage adaptation starring Lesley Manville and Jack Lowden was filmed and screened at numerous cinemas, and is available to view online.
