= Central Military Band of the Ministry of Defense of Russia =

Military band unit

- Центральный военный оркестр Министерства обороны России
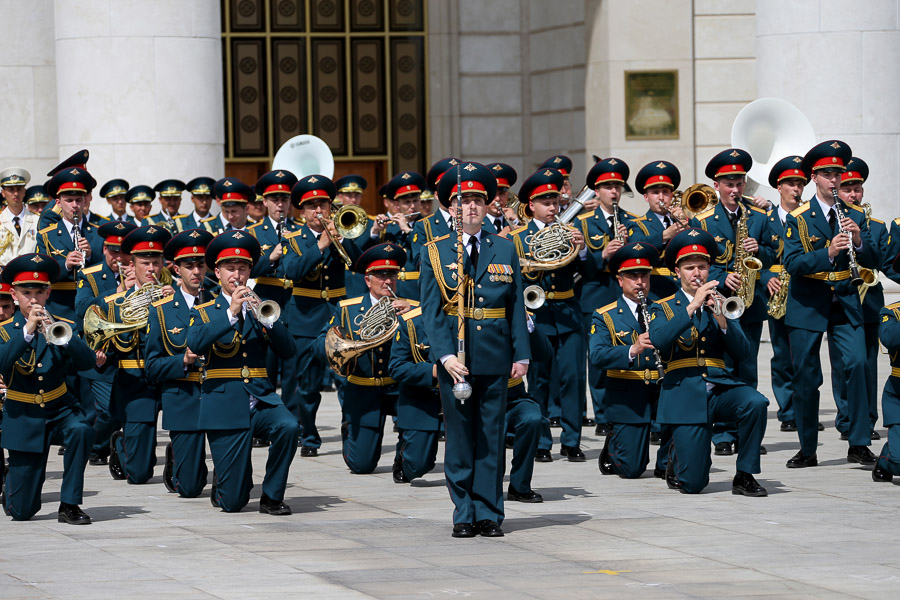
- Active: October 1, 1927 – present
- Country: USSR; Russia
- Branch: Ministry of Defense
- Type: Military Band
- Size: 230
- Garrison/HQ: Moscow
- Nickname: Red Army Band

Commanders
- Director of Music/Conductor: Colonel Sergey Durygin
- Drum Major: Major Andrey Nisenbaum
- Bandmaster: Lieutenant Colonel Konstantin Petrovich

Central Military Band of the Ministry of Defense of Russia, also known as the Red Army Band, is a military band unit of the Russian Armed Forces. It is a branch of the Military Band Service of the Armed Forces of Russia. The current head of the band is Colonel Sergey Durygin.

== Brief history ==
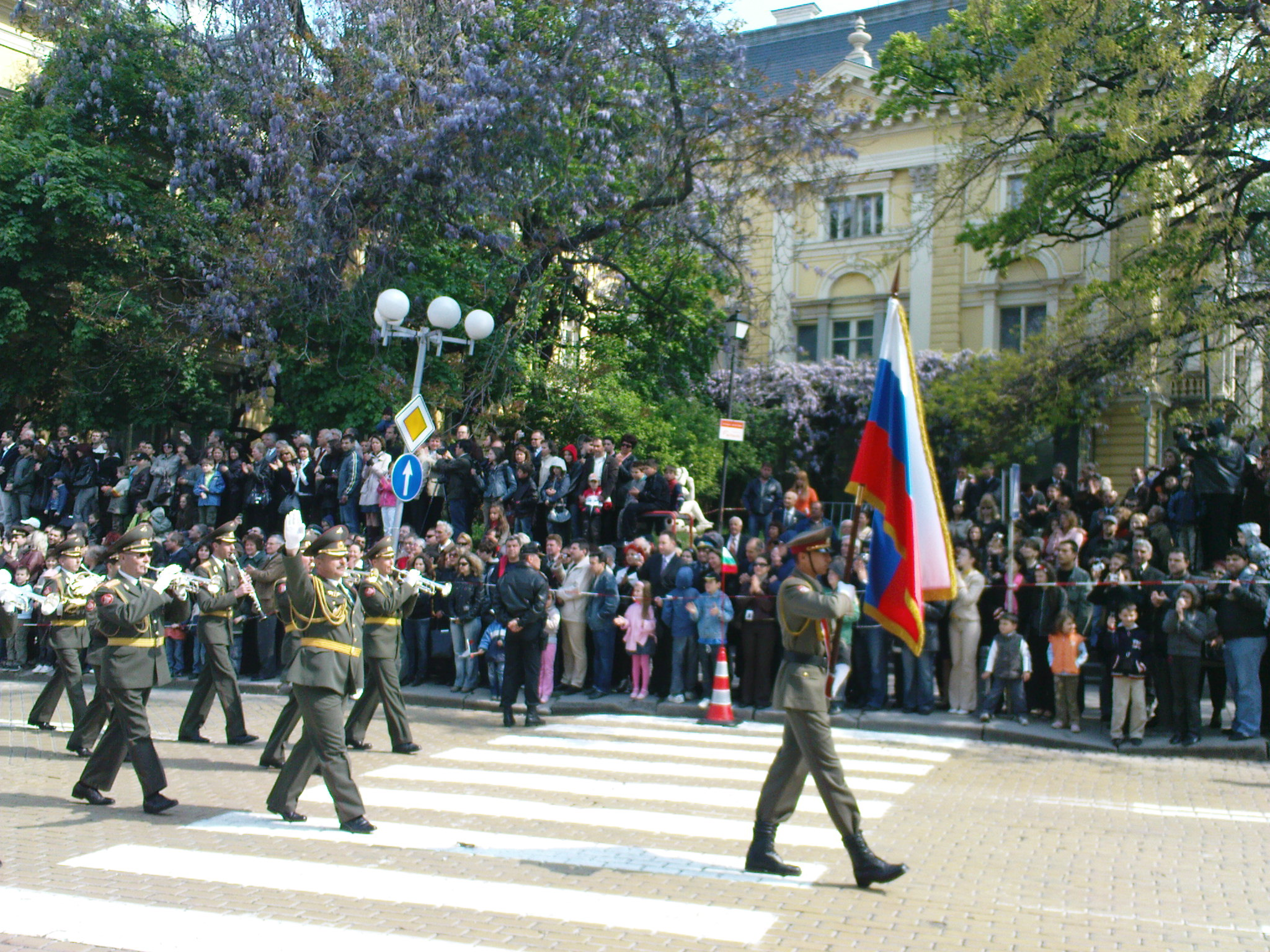
The band marching on Prince Alexander of Battenberg Square during the Bulgarian Armed Forces Day parade in 2009.

Even as the Presidential Band of the Russian Federation is the more senior military band of Russia (as it reports to the Federal Protective Service as part of the Kremlin Regiment), the CMB-MDR is the seniormost band in the Russian Armed Forces and the oldest active band in service, having been founded on October 1, 1927.

== Composition ==
The band consists of 227 musicians that come from all walks of life: civilians, contract soldiers, and conscript musicians serving their military service term. The band itself is divided into two sections: a brass band and a symphonic band.

== Activities and collaborations ==
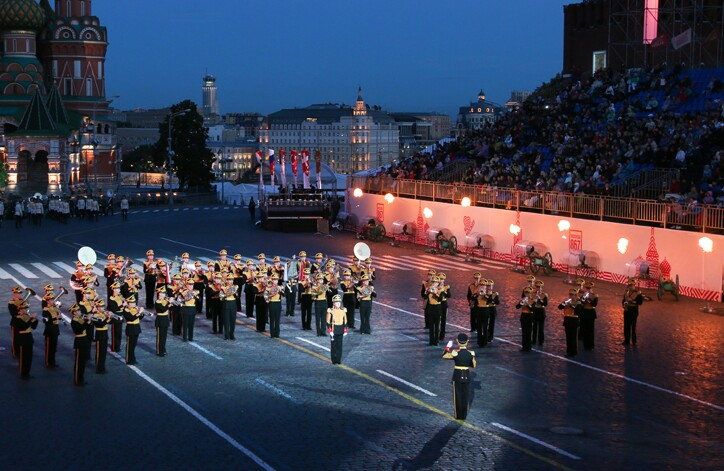
The band in their ceremonial uniform during the 2014 Spasskaya Tower Military Music Festival and Tattoo.

The band participates in social, and cultural events of Russia. It is a permanent participant in the Spasskaya Tower Military Music Festival and Tattoo. The band regularly performs in the Grand Kremlin Palace, the Spasskaya Tower Festival, and parades on Red Square. The central band actively tours the globe, and has made appearances in Algeria, Australia, Austria, Belgium, Bulgaria, Great Britain, Germany, Denmark, Israel, Italy, China, North Korea, Mongolia, Norway (Norwegian Military Tattoo 2002), Poland, the U.S., France, Switzerland, and Sweden. Among the individuals who have been associated with the band include former Canadian Army director of music Kenneth Snoeck and American performer Michael Jackson. It also collaborates extensively with the Moscow & District Pipe Band. The Central Band is required to take part in the Russian Honor Parade on Red Square on November 7. During the Hamina Tattoo in Finland in 2018, the band performed with the Band of the Royal Marines of Britain's Royal Navy where they performed songs such as Moscow Nights and Katyusha. In February 2020, the Central Military Band staged a concert to honor the 77th anniversary of Battle of Stalingrad in the Volgograd Philarmonia.

=== Wartime activity ===
By the time the Great Patriotic War began, the band was in the Belarusian SSR where it was staging a series of concerts in the Minsk Military District. Where the band performed at the Narev river, one side saw the band's performance while the other saw the German Wehrmacht preparing for Operation Barbarossa. The following day the war broke out. On 25 June 1941, the band returned to Moscow, three days after the start of hostilities. In September 1941, twenty-eight musicians from the band received an order to go to the Western Front. A month later, the band got surrounded by the German 3rd Panzer Army and 4th Panzer Army near the city of Vyazma during the Battle of Bryansk. Although receiving the orders to break through the enemy circle and withdraw, the transport vehicle that was meant to do so was caught in the crossfire of multiple units. Nine musicians died immediately, ten going missing. Despite this setback, the band never ceased to perform over the course of the war, staging over 500 concerts and making 150 appearances on the All-Union radio. Among its activities were the ceremonies of awarding units their colors and state honors.

== Directors of Music ==
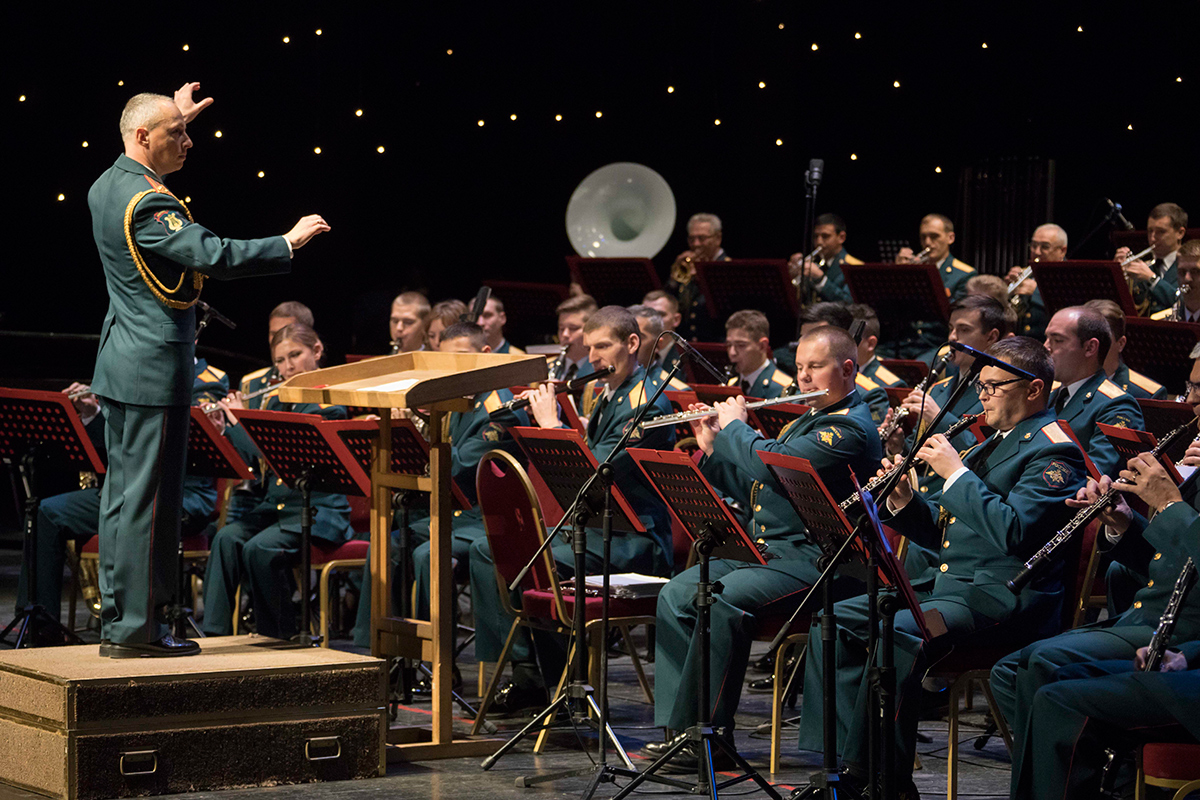
The band under the direction of Colonel Sergey Durygin during its 90th anniversary concert in 2017.

=== Senior Director of Music ===
Historically, since 1924, the Senior Director of Music of the Armed Forces has been the ceremonial chief of the band. In the Spasskaya Tower Military Music Festival and Tattoo editions of 2007, 2009 and 2010 the Central Band's Bandmaster, then Col Andrey Kolotushkin, served as the band conductor. Today, the director of music does not hold the post of Senior Director of Music of the Military Band Service in a concurrent capacity, as that post leads the overall direction and organization of all the active bands in the armed services.

- Major General Semyon Tchernetsky (1924–1949)
- Major General Ivan Petrov (1950–1958)
- Major General Nikolai Nazarov (1958–1976)
- Major General Nikolai Mikhailov (1976–1993)
- Lieutenant General Viktor Afanasyev (1993–2002)
- Lieutenant General Valery Khalilov (2002–2010)
- Colonel Sergey Durygin (2010–present)

=== Bandmasters ===
- B. Miller (?)
- P. Zabezhansky (?)
- N. Matukhnenko (?)
- I. Mironovich (?–1951)
- Nikolai Sergeev (1951–1977)
- A. Maltsev (1977–1985)
- Anatoly Mukhamedzhan (born Khamis Kharisovich) (1985–1994)
- A. Pestov (1994–?)
- V. Rusin (?–2003)
- Colonel Andrey Kolotushkin (2003–2010)
- Colonel Sergey Durygin (2010–present)

== Notable members ==
- Lev Mikhailov, clarinetist and saxophonist

== Recordings ==
A recording of the band performing the Anthem of the Armenian Soviet Socialist Republic.

- National Anthem of the Russian Federation
- State Anthem of the Soviet Union
- March "Vigorous"
- March "Parade"
- March "Holiday of Victory"
- March "Glory, Motherland"
- March of the 175th Baturinsky Infantry Regiment

== See also ==
- Military Band Service of the Armed Forces of Russia
- Special Exemplary Military Band of the Guard of Honor Battalion of Russia
