= Egyptian Armed Forces Symphonic Band =

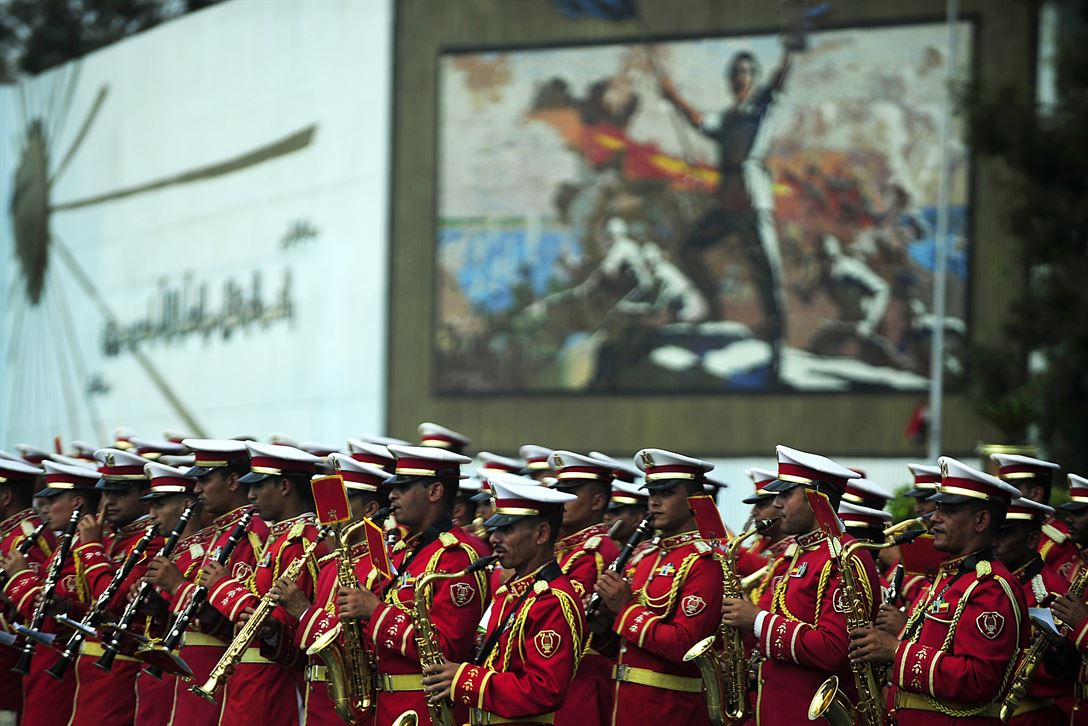
The band plays the Star Spangled Banner as U.S. Defense Secretary Leon Panetta participates in a wreath-laying ceremony at the Tomb of the Unknown Soldier in Cairo, October 4, 2011.

The Egyptian Armed Forces Symphonic Band (Arabic:الفرقة السمفونية العسكرية المصرية ) is the main band of the Egyptian Armed Forces made up of musicians who perform in official settings usually in the presence of the President of Egypt. The band is associated with its military music school which was founded on the basis of the symphonic band in 1992 for the purpose of educating Egyptian musicians. One of its most notable commanders is Major Ali Hijazi Ibrahim and First Lieutenant Samy Mosaad Shehat A Delf Hegazy.

== Purpose ==
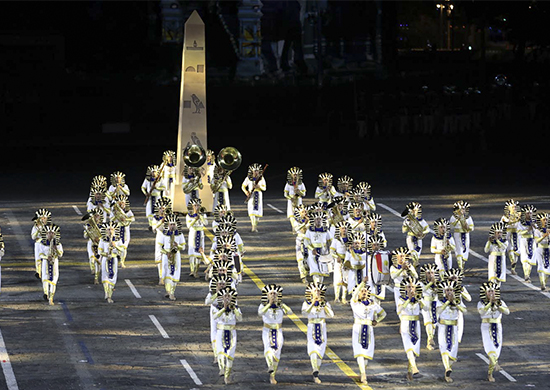
The band performing in Moscow in August 2019.

The official functions of the symphonic band lie in state ceremonies that involve the Egyptian Government and the Egyptian Armed Forces. These ceremonies include playing the national anthem during State visits of foreign leaders to Cairo and playing military marches during military parades in the capital. In its ranks the symphonic band keeps a pipes and drums group at its front. Band musicians have commonly been trained by British and Italian officers.

=== Extra functions ===
For over half a century, the band has also participated in numerous high-profile cultural and sport events along with regular protocol events. In the 1960s, the band was a prize winner for best military band for six years in a row at the International Festival of Military Music in Bari, Italy. The band also performed at the Royal Edinburgh Military Tattoo in 1995, at the Berlin International Folk Music Festival in 2000 and 2004, and the Spasskaya Tower Military Music Festival and Tattoo in 2017 and 2019.

== Criticism ==
In the 2010s, the band was criticised due to its poor performances when playing national anthems during state visits. For example, the band performed anthems such as State Anthem of the Russian Federation, Deutschlandlied, and La Marseillaise poorly during state visits of Vladimir Putin (Russia), Angela Merkel (Germany), and Francois Hollande (France) to Egypt respectively.

== See also ==
- Republican Guard (Egypt)
- Corps of drums
