= Presidential Band of Burkina Faso =

Military band

The Presidential Band of Burkina Faso (French: L'Orchestre de la Présidence du Faso), is the premier musical organization of the Burkina Faso Armed Forces and serves as the official musical ensemble of the president of Burkina Faso. Its missions include, among others, contributing to the promotion of the image of the Presidency of Faso on a national and international level, promoting Burkinabe culture and participating in the moral support of the troops.

== Description ==
It was created in accordance with the presidential decree of the president of Burkina Faso, Captain Ibrahim Traoré on 13 February 2025. In June 2025, it held its inaugural concert at the Place Nemaro in Pô, on the sidelines of the graduation of the 24th class of the Georges Namoano Military Academy. In August 2025, the band was commissioned to provide musical support to the 17th edition of the Spasskaya Tower Military Music Festival and Tattoo, dedicated to the 80th anniversary of Victory Day, held on Red Square in Moscow. It is headed by Squadron Commander Captain Aimé Césaire Ouédraogo, a military conductor and Moscow Conservatory graduate. Structurally, it is attached to the Special Staff of the Presidency. The ensemble comprises the following:

- Choir
- Folk Instruments Group (incorporating instruments like the djembe and balafon)
- Military Band Section
- Wind Instrument Section
- String Section

It is contains both military and civilian personnel, with civilian musicians employed under contract with the Presidency.

== See also ==
- Nigerian Army Band Corps
- Ghana Armed Forces Central Band
