= Hellenic Air Force Band =

- Σμήνος Μουσικής Πολεμικής Αεροπορίας
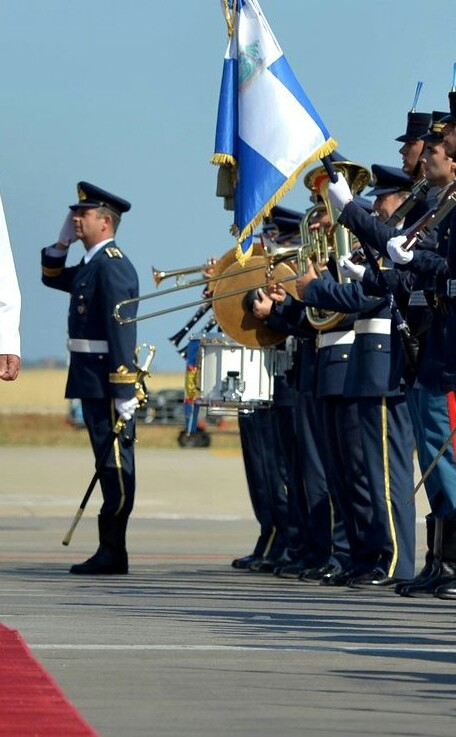
- Active: 1947–present
- Country: Greece
- Branch: Hellenic Air Force
- Type: Military band
- Part of: Hellenic Air Force General Staff
- Garrison/HQ: Vironas Camp, Attica

Commanders
- Director of Music: Major Alexandros Litsaropoulos

The Hellenic Air Force Band, formally the Air Force Music Flight (Greek: Σμήνος Μουσικής Πολεμικής Αεροπορίας) is an official military band of the Greek Air Force.

The HAF Band was founded in 1947 with reservist personnel, and was initially 40 strong, under flying officer Nikolaos Raftopoulos. In 1953 the HAF Band began to be filled with permanent staff. It is one of three primary military bands in the Hellenic Armed Forces.

== Mission ==
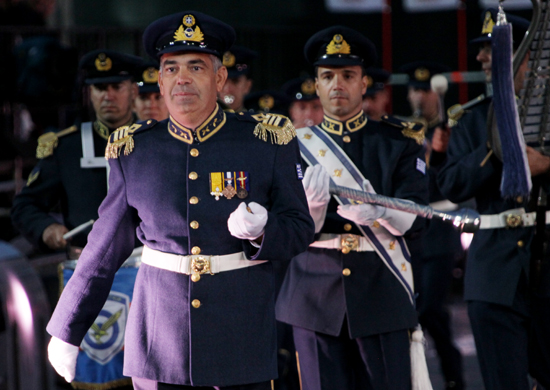
The commander of the band, Major Vasileios Kounadis leading the band during a festival in Moscow in 2012.

The band provides musical support to various events of military, social, cultural, religious, and recreational nature. The responsibilities of the band includes the welcoming of foreign heads of state and government, supporting ceremonies at the Presidential Mansion and Tomb of the Unknown Soldier and in the receptions of military leaders of the air force. Every three years the band participates in a parade on 5th Avenue in New York in honour of Greek Independence Day on March 25. Between 2011 and 2012, the band (then under the leadership of Major Vasileios Kounadis), also competed in the Spasskaya Tower Military Music Festival and Tattoo in Moscow, Russia.

It comprises the band, with 42 full-time musicians (three officers and 39 NCOs), and the light orchestra with seven NCOs. The commander of the HAF Band is Major Alexandros Litsaropoulos.
