= Representative Music Band of the Mexican Armed Forces =

Representative Music Band of the Mexican Armed Forces Banda Representativa de Música de las Fuerzas Armadas Mexicanas
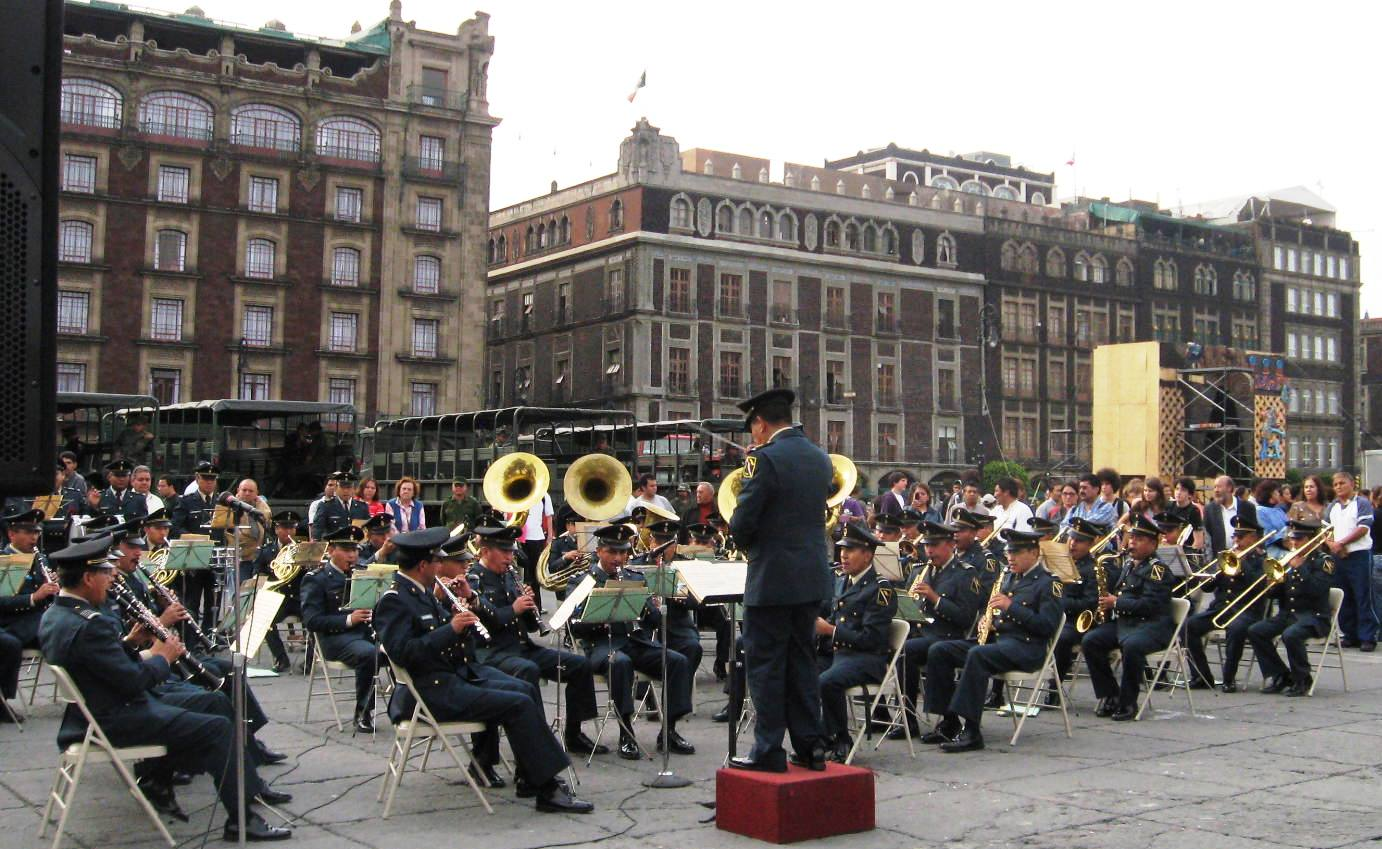
- The music band in Mexico City.

Background information
- Origin: Mexico City, Mexico
- Years active: 1889–present

The Representative Music Band of the Mexican Armed Forces (Banda Representativa de Música de las Fuerzas Armadas Mexicanas in Spanish) is a Mexican military band.

== See also ==
- Cuban Revolutionary Armed Forces Military Bands Department
- Musical Unit of the Spanish Royal Guard

== Videos ==
- Banda de Música de las Fuerzas Armadas Mexicanas en el "Festival de Música Militar Saumur, Francia".
- Banda de música representativa de las Fuerzas Armadas Mexicanas.
