= Roman Markholia =

- Роман Михайлович Мархолиа
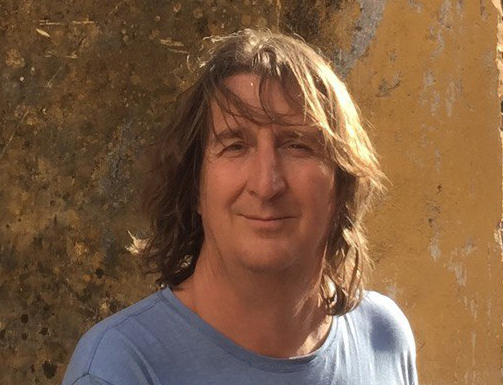
- Born: February 5, 1961 (age 65); Leningrad
- Occupations: theatre director and teacher, event organizer
- Website: markholia.ru

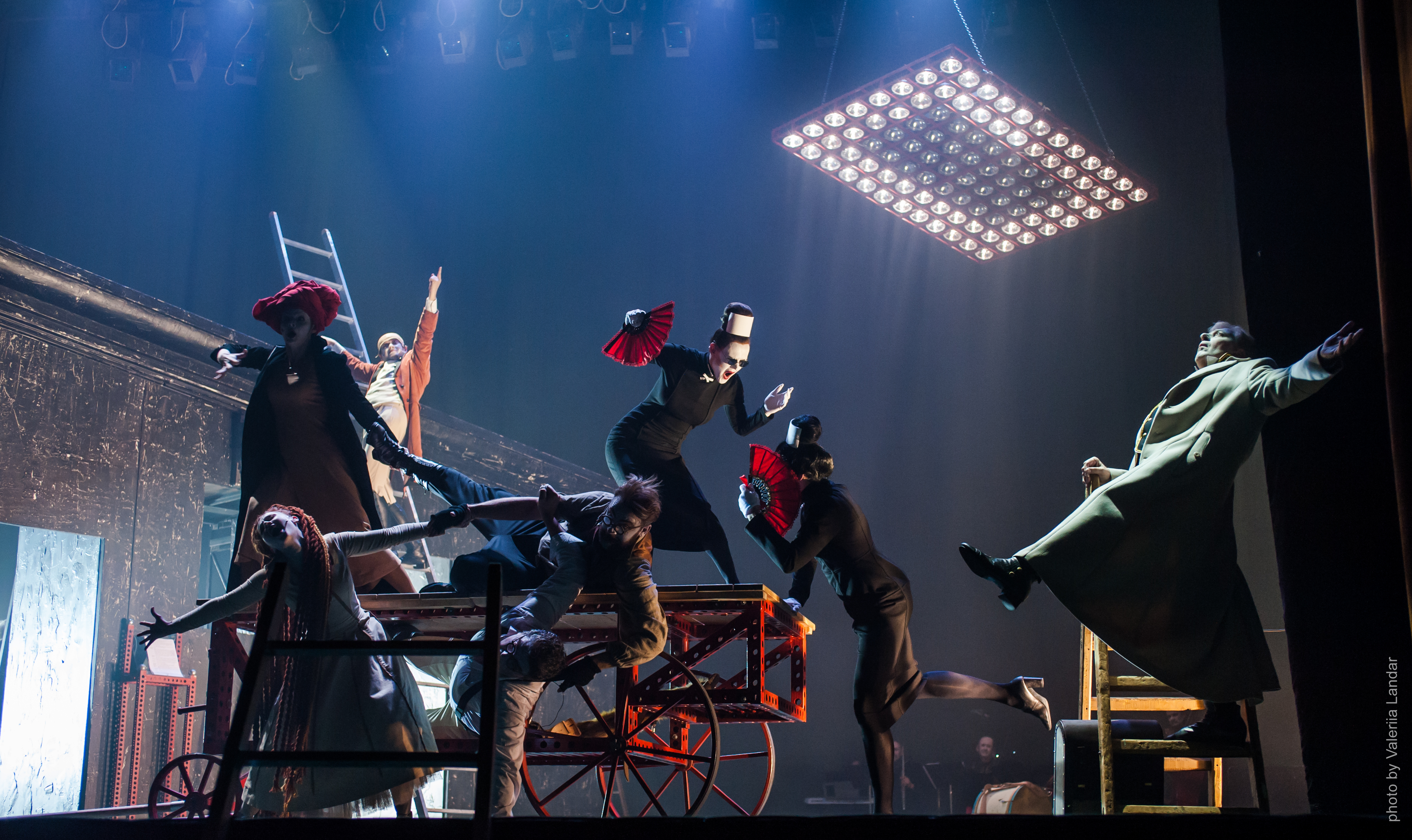
"Broken pot" by Kleist, Ivan Franko theatre

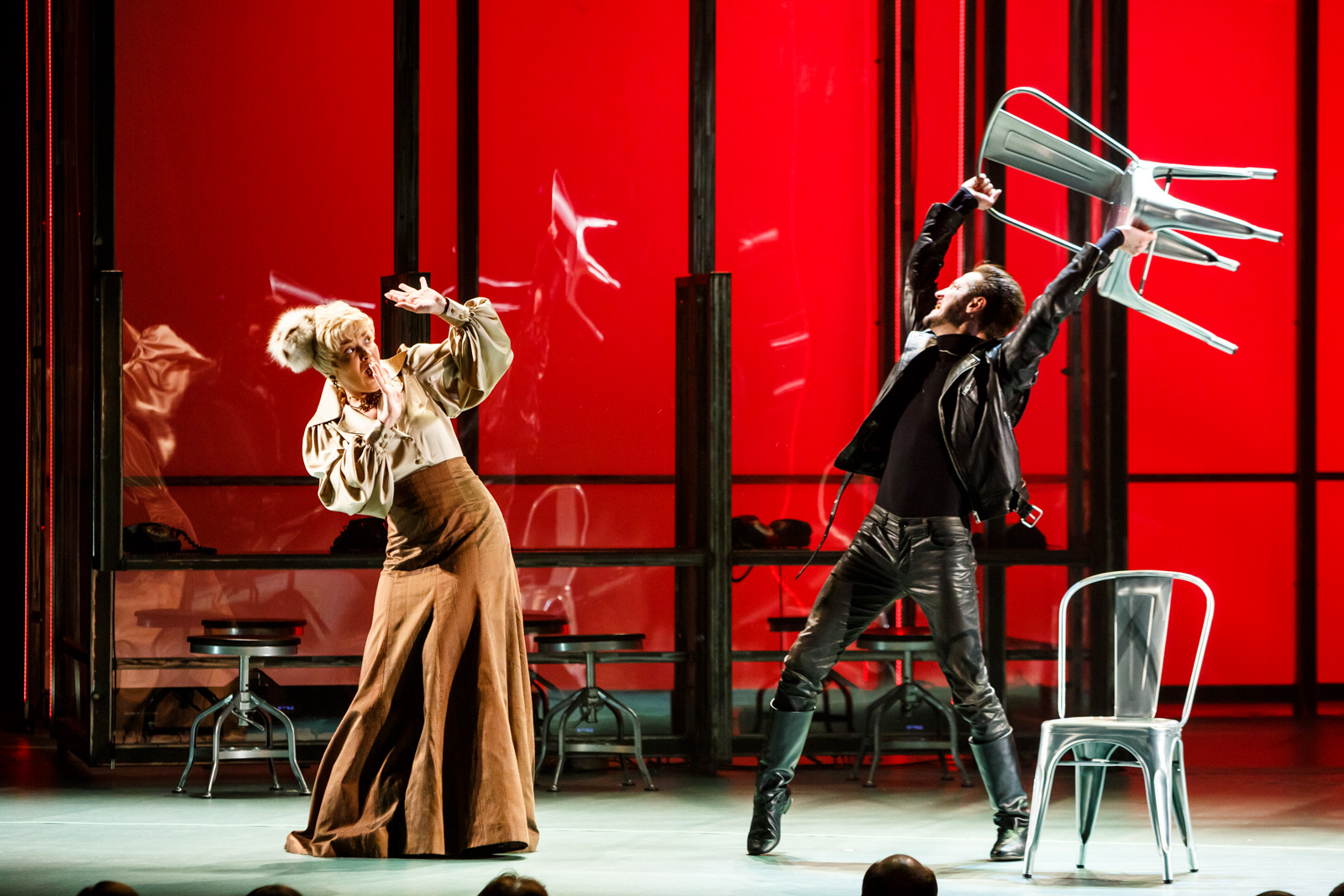
"Karamazovy brothers" by Dostoevsky, Yaroslavl Volkov theatre

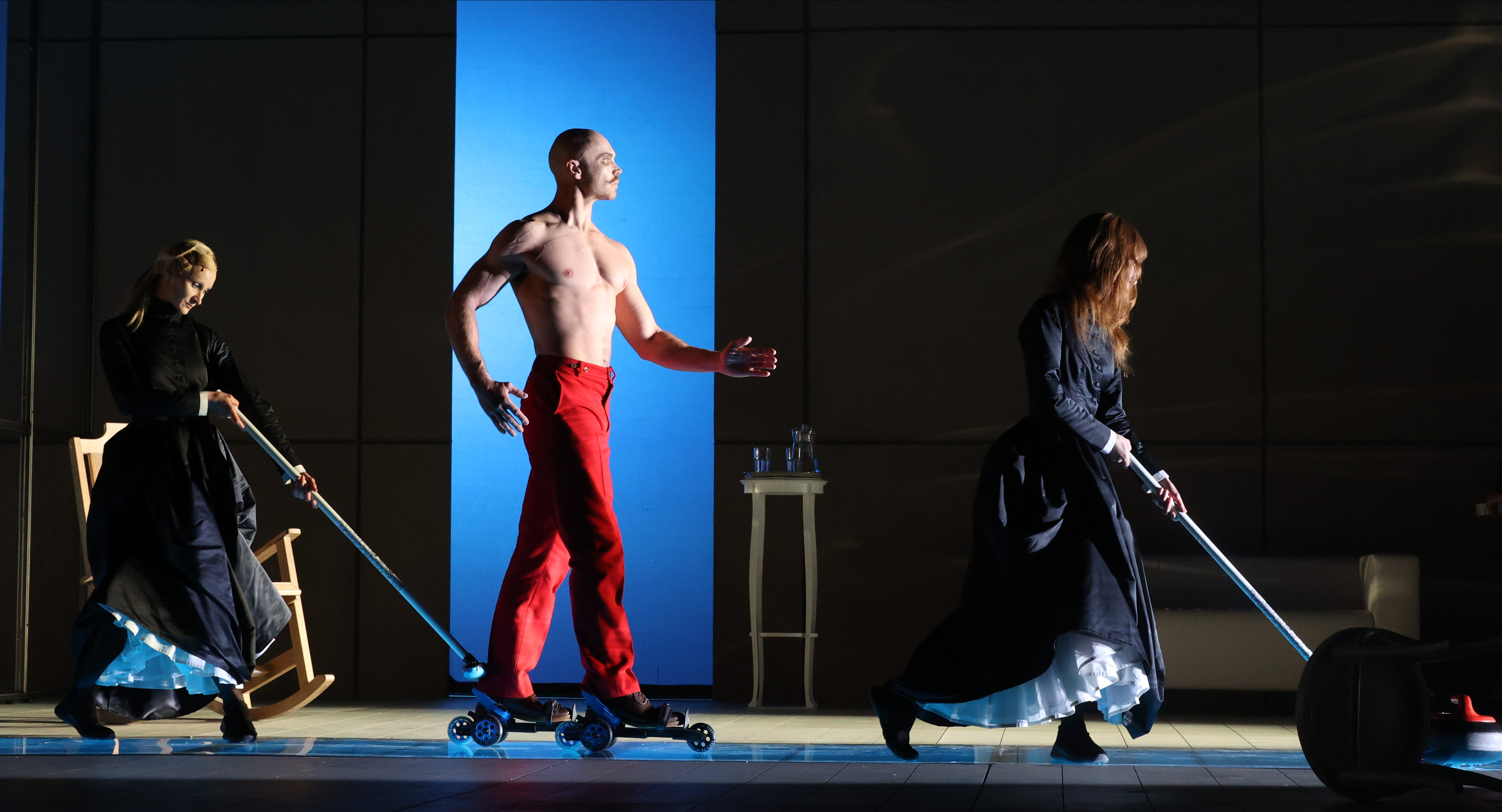
"Ghosts" by H. Ibsen, BDT theatre

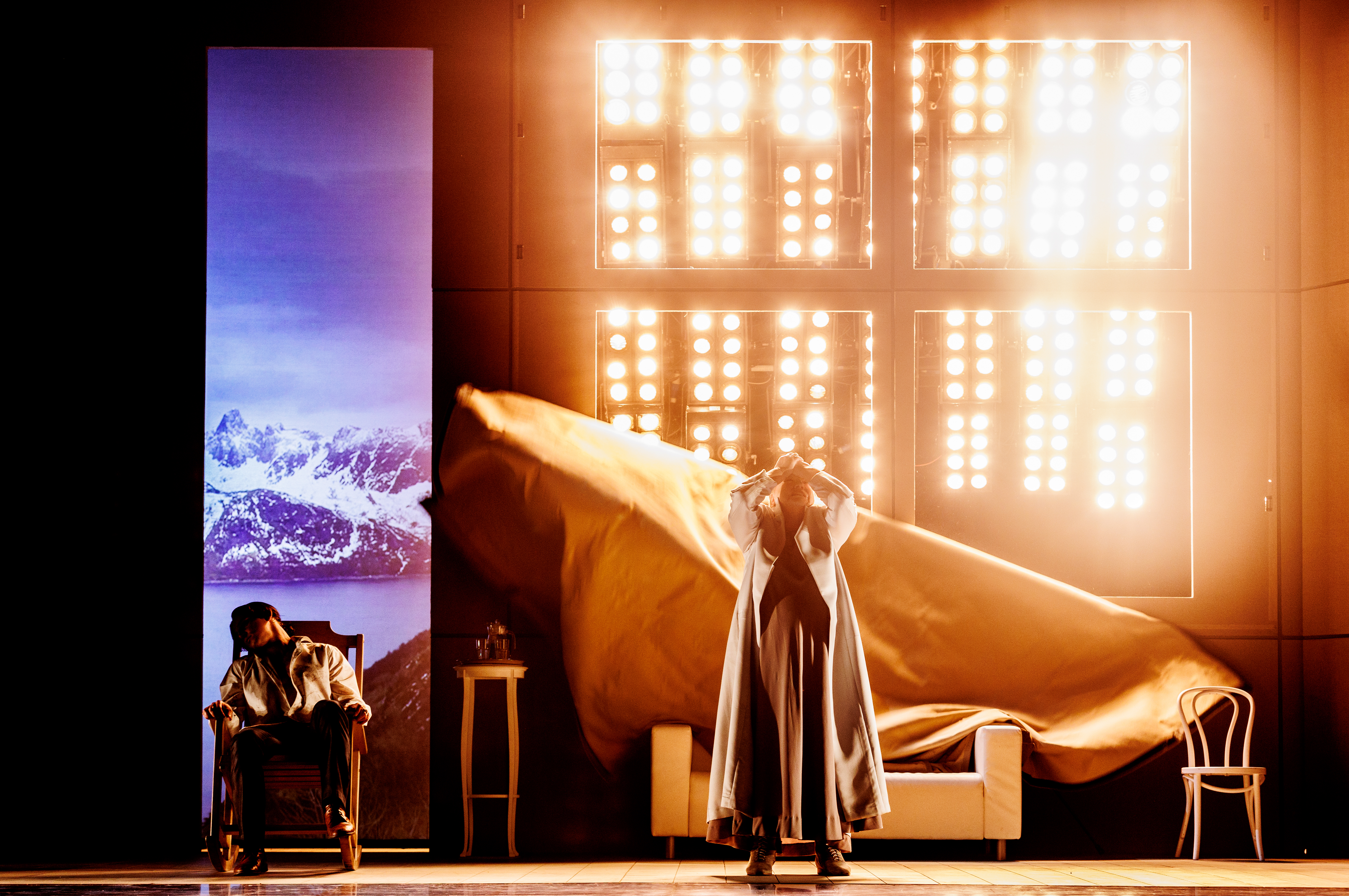
"Ghosts" by H. Ibsen, BDT theatre

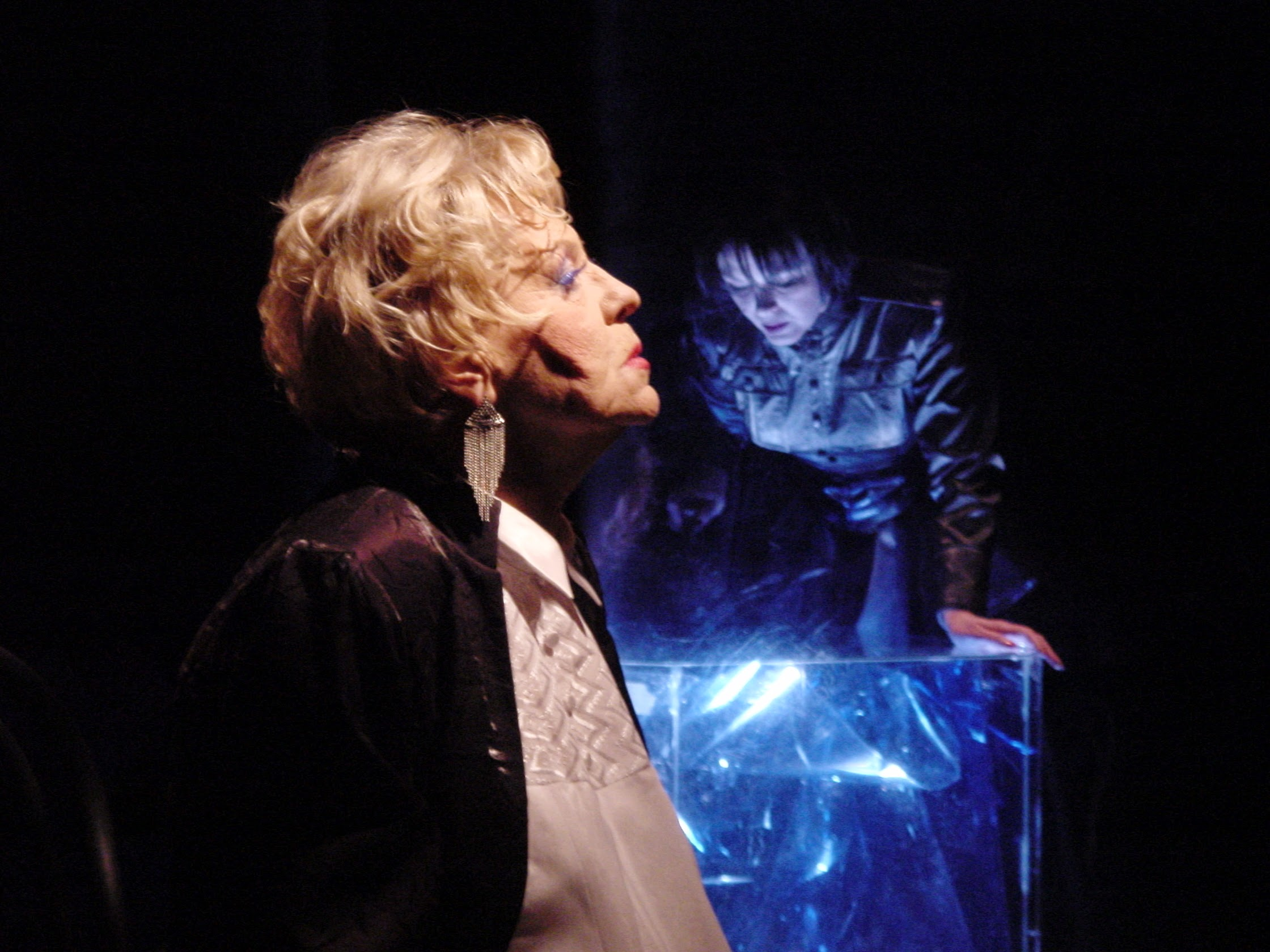
"Three tall women" by E. Allbee, Moscow House of Actor

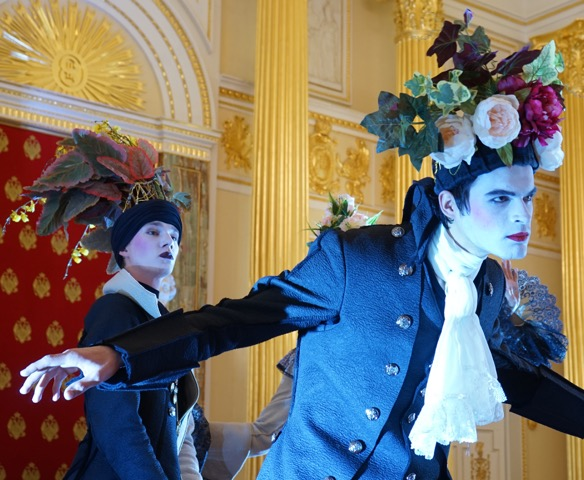
"Aminta" Pastoral Opera by Sergey Gavrilov

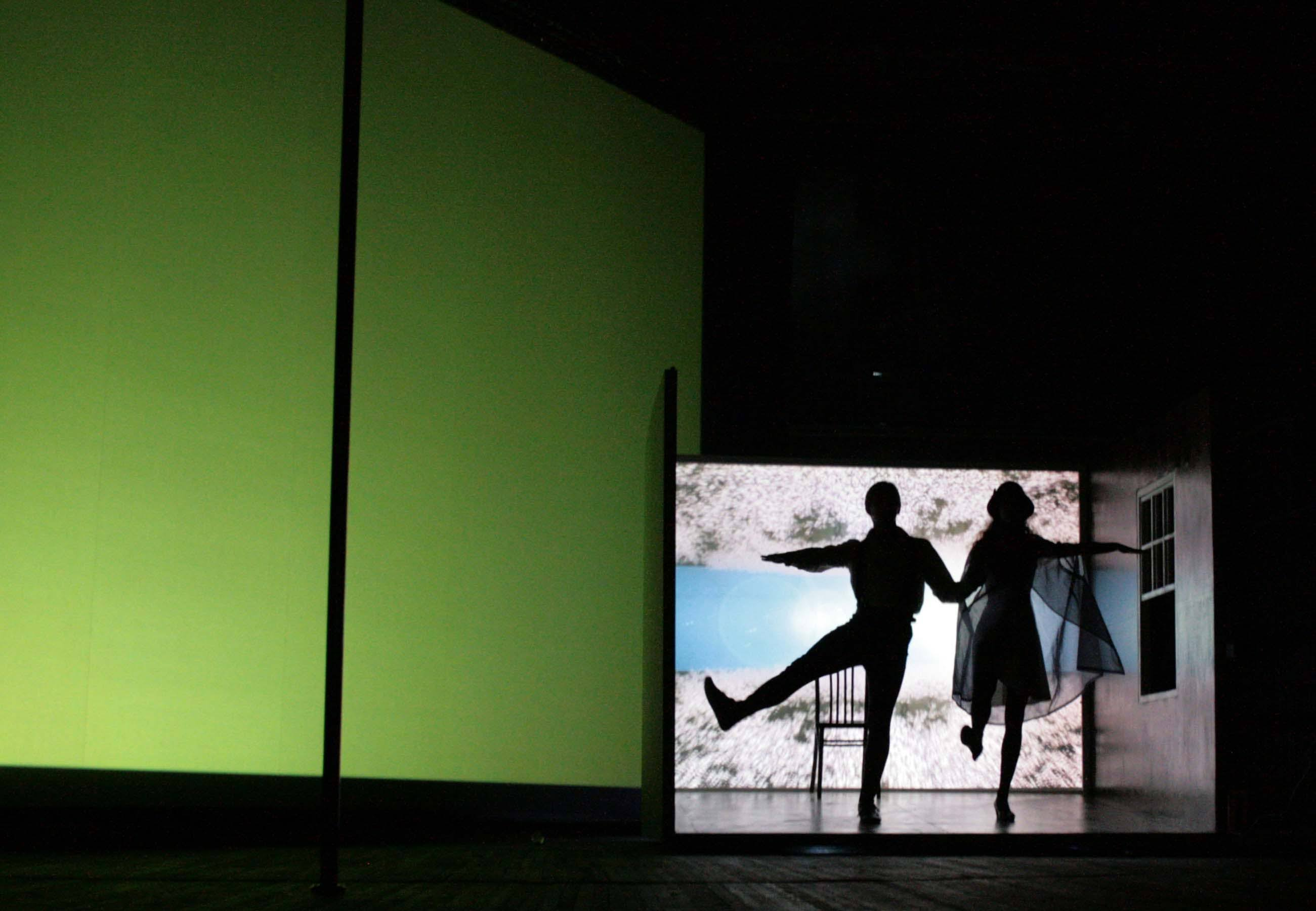
"Midsummer night dream" by Shakespeare, Yakutsk Drama Theatre

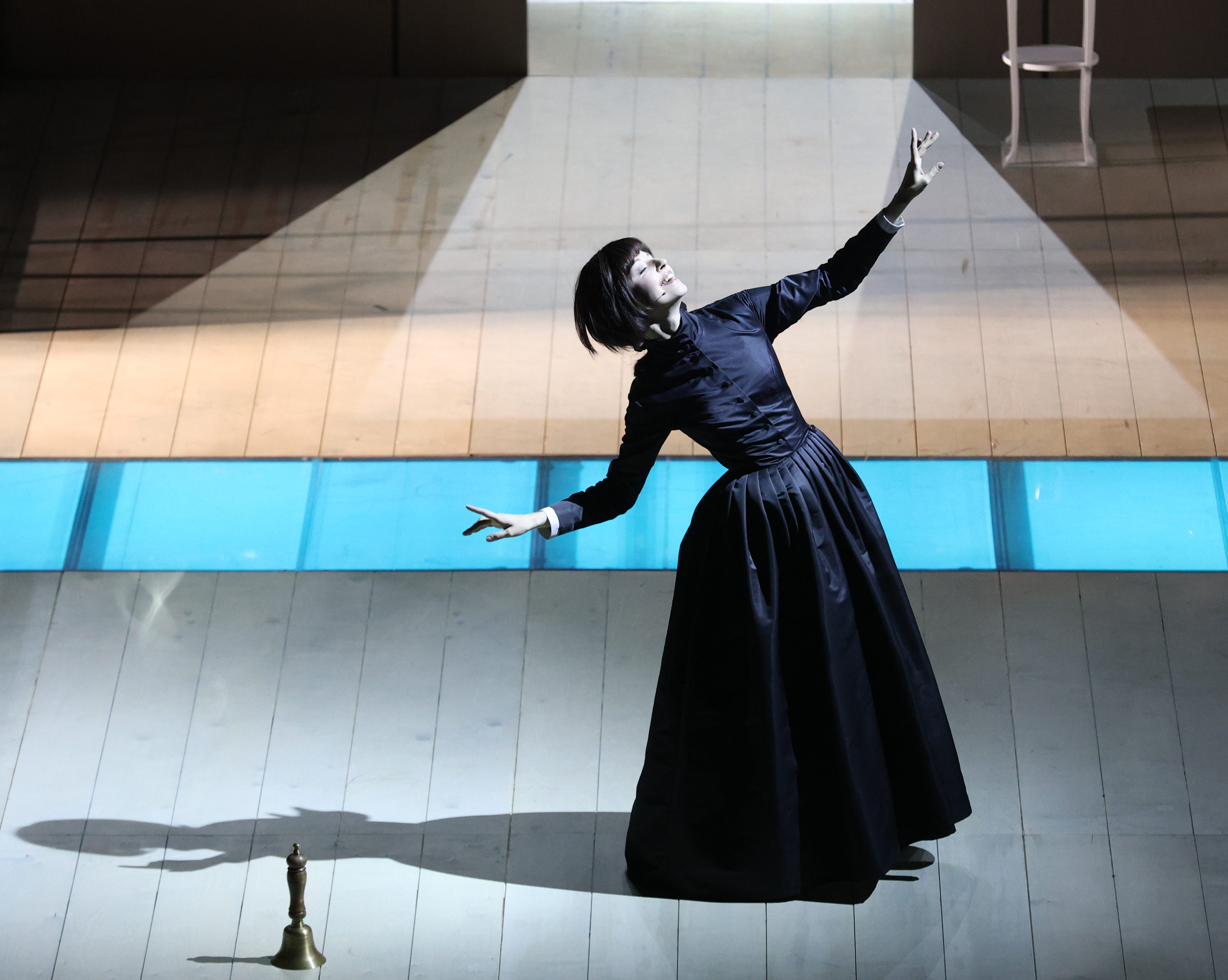
"Ghosts" by H. Ibsen, BDT theatre

Roman Mikhailovich Markholia (born 5.02.1961) is a Russian theatre director and teacher, known for works in Russia, Ukraine and at international festivals.

== Biography ==
Born in USSR in Leningrad in 1961. His father Mikhail Konstantinovich Markholia (Kuzhba) was of Abkhazian origin and was local cultural figure, also a director, who participated in creation of Abkhazian TV and Abkhazian cinema studio. The mother Tatiana Pavlovna was a scientist (physical chemist) with a degree candidate of sciences. The original family of the father Mikhail (Kuzhba) suffered from Stalinist repressions and was exiled to Siberia. 6-months-old Mikhail was raised in an adoptive family with surname Markholia, where he survived, grew up and educated. After return from exile, relatives from Kuzhba family now live in Krasnodar krai and Jordan. The brother of Roman, Yuri Mikhailovich Markholia, is also a director and TV producer working in Russia.

Roman Markholia went to school in Sukhumi (Georgian SSR) and in the age of 18 moved to Moscow (RSFSR) to enroll to Russian Institute of Theatre Arts. There he joined courses of drama theatre directors headed by People's Artist of the USSR Iosif Tumanov and was the youngest of students. After Tumanov's death, the courses became headed by Anatoly Efros. Roman Markholia graduated from the institute with red diploma and moved to Lvov (Ukrainian SSR) to work in the Theatre of Soviet Army's Carpathian Military District where his professional career started. The very first his work, a play called Sashka, based on a story by writer Vyacheslav Kondratiev, brought him a grand prix at a republican theatre festival and notability in Ukraine. Later he served in the Soviet Army at Lvov Political School, and afterwards continued to work in the same theatre. His plays participated in many of republican and all-USSR festivals. He joined the Laboratory of Directors and Stage Designers headed by People's Artist of USSR Daniil Lider.

=== Sevastopol period ===
In 1987 Roman Markholia moved to Sevastopol by invitation from actor and director Vladimir Petrov. In 1988, at the age of 27, he became the director general of Sevastopol Lunacharsky Theatre, the youngest of its kind in the whole country at the moment.

Since 1989 until 1994 he worked as organizer of a prominent international theatre festival called "Chersonesus Games". It was supported by ministries of culture of USSR, Russian Federation and Ukraine, international foundations, theatre and creative unions of several countries. The festival became a landmark venue for many of young theatre figures of ex-USSR and nearby countries. Many of future prominent theatre directors asserted themselves at those events, among them: Sergey Zhenovach, Andriy Zholdak, Ovlyakuli Hojakuli, Yevgeny Kamenkovich, Dmitry Bogomazov, Andrey Zhitinkin, Igor Larin and many others.

These proceedings, which included intense festival activities and massive public response, were negatively accepted by conservative part of Roman Markholia's theatre crew. That led to ousting Roman Markholia in 1994 from the theatre by the will of the Party Organization left from USSR-time CPSU. Together with city's culture authority, the position of director general was disbanded and the theatre became headed by the organization's secretary M. Kondratenko.

=== Saint Petersburg period ===
Roman Markholia moved to his native Saint Petersburg and began to stage plays at Komissarzhevskaya Theatre, Liteyny Theatre, Baltic House Festival Theatre. He also started to teach actors at courses headed by Andrei Tolubeyev at Russian State Institute of Performing Arts (subdivision of Tovstonogov Bolshoi Drama Theater). As well, he staged plays in Riga, Vilnius, Yaroslavl and Krasnoyarsk. Participated in international theatre events in Russia and Europe. Conducted master classes for actors in Bristol (UK). Interned in the USA. Graduates from courses of European theatre management in Amsterdam University (1996–1998).

=== Moscow, Petersburg, Yaroslavl, Kyiv ===
In 2000 Roman Markholia moved to Moscow and began to work for TV, without leaving theatre activities. He made a number of TV plays and films for channel Russia-K, some works were also aired on channels ORT and TVC. Some of the projects were nominated for TEFI award, the leading Russia's TV prize.

In 2003 Roman Markholia staged the play "Quartet" by Ronald Harwood, which was a theatre debut of prominent movie actress Barbara Brylska (the play was also featured by Svetlana Kryuchkova, Kakhi Kavsadze and Igor Dmitriev).

In 2004 Roman Markholia participated as assistant director in Edinburgh International Festival, staging Anton Chekhov's The Seagull together with Peter Stein. Also Roman Markholia actively participated in creation and work of "Theatre of the Ingenuous" by Igor Neupokoev. As well, he staged the play "Pierrette's Bedspread" together with international team and widely toured with it across Europe and Russia. From 2006 till 2010 he, together with Sebastian Kaiser, organized and carried out the festival "Balaklava Odyssey" dedicated to contemporary art and multimedia, residing at former fortification structures.

Since 2007 to 2009 Roman Markholia served as artistic director of Yaroslavl Young Spectators Theatre. Staged plays "Light Without Heat" by Ostrovsky, "Three Sisters" by Chekhov.

In 2009 he prepared a special project dedicated to jubilee of Kremlin Regiment in St. George 's Hall of Moscow Kremlin called "Georgian Assembly" featuring People's Artist of the RSFSR Alla Demidova. Accepted invitation to become director general of the Spasskaya Tower Military Music Festival and Tattoo (2010–2012).

From 2010 to 2014 organized Sevastoppol International Art Festival "War and Peace". The festival gathers in Sevastopol military orchestras of Russia, Ukraine, Germany, France, Poland, Algeria, Belarus, Greece and other countries. Aside from military music, the event featured open-air opera plays, cinema shows, photo exhibits, plays of the festival Golden Mask. "War and Peace" festival gained popularity in Sevastopol and turned into a "summer cultural brand" of the city.

Since 2014 until present time Roman Markholia stages plays in Tovstonogov Theater, Yaroslavl Volkov Theater, Ukrainian Ivan Franko National Academic Drama Theater, Nuradilov National Chechen Theater, Lunacharsky Sevastopol Theater. Together with Svetlana Kryuchkova directs Laboratory of Actors at Union of Theatre Workers of the Russian Federation, conducts master classes at that Union.

== Notable works ==
Roman Markholia staged about 50 plays in different theatres, organized and directed a number of festivals, worked in several of educational projects. Also he is the author of several translations of plays from English to Russian. Among notable works are (see full list in Russian):

- "Blood Wedding" by García Lorca. Hampashi Nuradilov Chechen Academic Theatre (2024)
- "Ghosts" by Henrik Ibsen, Bolshoi Drama Theatre named after Tovstonogov, Saint-Petersburg (2022)
- "Othello" by William Shakespeare, Hampashi Nuradilov Chechen State Dramatic Theatre
- "The Queen of Spades" based on the short story by Alexander Pushkin. Sevastopol Academic Russian Drama Theatre named after A. V. Lunacharsky 2020
- "The Life Before Us" by Emile Ajar Bolshoi Drama Theatre named after Tovstonogov, Saint-Petersburg 2019
- "The Brothers Karamazov" based on the novel by Fedor Dostoyevsky. Russian State Academic Drama Theatre named after F. Volkov (Volkov Theatre), Yaroslavl, 2018
- "Aminta" by Torquato Tasso, The "Russian seasons" festival in Italy 2017
- "The Broken Jug" by Heinrich von Kleist. The Ivan Franko National Academic Drama Theatre in Kyiv, 2017
- "The Gambler" by Fedor Dostoyevsky, Bolshoi Drama Theatre named after Tovstonogov, Saint-Petersburg, 2015
- "The Living Corpse" by Leo Tolstoy, The Ivan Franko National Academic Drama Theatre in Kyiv, 2014

International festivals:

- Spasskaya Tower Military Music Festival and Tattoo (artistic director) 2010–2012
- Sevastopol Arts Festival "War and Peace" (general director and artistic director) 2009–2014
- Balaklava Odyssey media art festival (director, co-organizer) 2006–2010
- Sevastopol Drama Theatre Festival "Chersonesus Games" (artistic director) 1991–1994

== Awards and nominations ==
- Grand prix of the Ukrainian Republican National Festival in Sumy ("Sashka" by V. Kondratiev), 1983.
- Grand prix of Golden Lion festival (The Long Christmas Dinner by Thornton Wilder), 1996.
- Governor of Krasnoyarsk Krai award, best play of 1999–2000 season (The Captain's Daughter by Pushkin).
- Nomination for TEFI in 2003 for best directing (TV movies "Pierrette's Bedspread", "Captain Kopeikin's Story").
- "Golden Kyiv Pectoral" for best play, best directing and scenography ("Living corpse by Tolstoy"), 2014.
- Sevastopol city prize for best play 2020–2021 ("Queen of Spades" by Pushkin).
- Diploma winner of the Golden Mask Festival 2023–2024 (G. Lorca's "Blood Wedding");
- "Golden Fund of Russian Theatrical Productions" (G. Lorca's "Blood Wedding");
- "Best Performance" of the 2025 Southern Stage International Festival of National Theatres (G. Lorca's "Blood Wedding").

In 2024, Roman Mikhailovich Markholia was awarded the title of "Honored Artist of the Chechen Republic".
