= Lev Mikhailov =

Russian musician (1936–2003)

- Genres: classical music
- Instruments: clarinet and saxophone

Lev Nikolayevich Mikhailov (Russian: Лев Никола́евич Миха́йлов; 1936–2003) was a Russian clarinetist and saxophonist. He taught clarinet and saxophone at the Moscow Conservatory. Mikhailov performed with the Moscow Radio Orchestra, the Orchestra of the Bolshoi Theatre and the State Symphony Orchestra of the USSR. In 1991 he emigrated to Spain.

== Discography ==
- Dmitriev: Chamber And Electronic Music, with the Kyiv Saxophone Quartet and the USSR State Radio Symphony Orchestra. Boheme Music, 2001.
- Artyomov: Concert Of The 13, Awakening, with the Russian State Symphony Orchestra and the Moscow Philharmonic Orchestra. Boheme Music, 2001.
