= Bicycle Showband Crescendo =

Bicycle Showband Crescendo Fiets Showband Crescendo
- Origin: Opende, Netherlands
- Genres: Brass
- Years active: 1973–present
- Members: Erik van der Ploeg (Bandmaster)
- Website: www.bicycleband.nl

The Bicycle Showband Crescendo (Dutch: Fiets Showband Crescendo) is a Dutch musical group based in Opende, Netherlands. It is a Mounted band, as all of its members perform their instruments on bicycles, serving as a type of Bicycle infantry. Today, the band is the only mounted band of its kind in the world.

It was formed in 1922, and has since performed at many occasions, such as open air cycling shows, cycling competitions, and musical festivals. Some notable events in which the band has taken part in include festivals in Japan (a country it has visited eight times), Malaysia, Turkey, Russia, Romania and China. At the time of its founding, it was simply a concert orchestra, which evolved over the years into a marching band in 1960, and finally a mounted fanfare band in 1973. The costume of the crescendo depends on the occasion, with the options being a red & blue official uniform, as well as Volendams, which is a traditional piece of Dutch clothing which originates from the village of Volendam in North Holland.
