= Winfield Scott (disambiguation) =

Winfield Scott (1786–1866) was a United States Army general and presidential candidate.

Winfield Scott may also refer to:

- Winfield Scott (chaplain) (1837–1910), United States Army chaplain
- Winfield Scott Schley (1839–1911), rear admiral in the United States Navy and the hero of the Battle of Santiago de Cuba during the Spanish–American War.
- Winfield Townley Scott (1910–1968), American poet, critic and diarist
- Winfield Scott (songwriter) (1920–2015), American songwriter
- Winfield W. Scott Jr. (1927-2022), United States Air Force general, superintendent of the U.S. Air Force Academy
- Winfield W. Scott III (1952-), United States Air Force general, commander of the Tanker Airlift Control Center

== Other ==
- Winfield Scott (ship), a list of ships

== See also ==
- Winfield Scott Hancock, United States Army General
