= General Scott =

General Scott may refer to:

== United Kingdom ==
- Charles Rochfort Scott (1797–1872), British Army major general
- Francis Cunningham Scott (1834–1902), British Army major general
- James Scott (British Army officer, died 1747) (c. 1672–1747), British Army lieutenant general
- James Bruce Scott (1892–1974), British Indian Army major general
- James Scott, 1st Duke of Monmouth (1649–1685), Dutch-born English Army general
- John Scott (British Army officer) (1725–1775), British Army major general
- Michael Scott (British Army officer) (born 1941), British Army major general
- Thomas Scott (British Army officer) (1905–1976), British Army major general
- William Henry Scott (British Army officer), (1789–1868), British Army general

== United States ==
- Charles Scott (governor), (1739–1813), Continental Army major general
- Hugh L. Scott (1853–1934), U.S. Army major general and Chief of Staff
- John Alden Scott (1916–1986), U.S. Marine Reserves brigadier general
- Robert Lee Scott Jr. (1908–2006), U.S. Air Force brigadier general
- Robert Kingston Scott (1826–1900), Union Army brigadier general and brevet major general
- John Morin Scott (1730–1784), Continental Army brigadier general
- Thomas M. Scott (1829–1876), Confederate States Army brigadier general
- Tom William Scott (1902–1988), U.S. Air Force brigadier general
- Willard Warren Scott Jr. (1926–2009), U.S. Army lieutenant general
- Winfield Scott (1786–1866), U.S. Army lieutenant general
- Winfield W. Scott Jr. (born 1927), U.S. Air Force lieutenant general
- Winfield W. Scott III (fl. 1970s–2000s), U.S. Air Force major general

== See also ==
- David Scott-Barrett (1922–2003), British Army lieutenant general
- George Kenneth Scott-Moncrieff (1855–1924), British Army major general
- James Scott-Elliot (1902–1996), British Army major general
- Logan Scott-Bowden (1920–2014), British Army major general
- Robert Scott-Kerr (1859–1942), British Army brigadier general
- Attorney General Scott (disambiguation)
