= Jabara Award =

U.S. Air Force award for airmanship

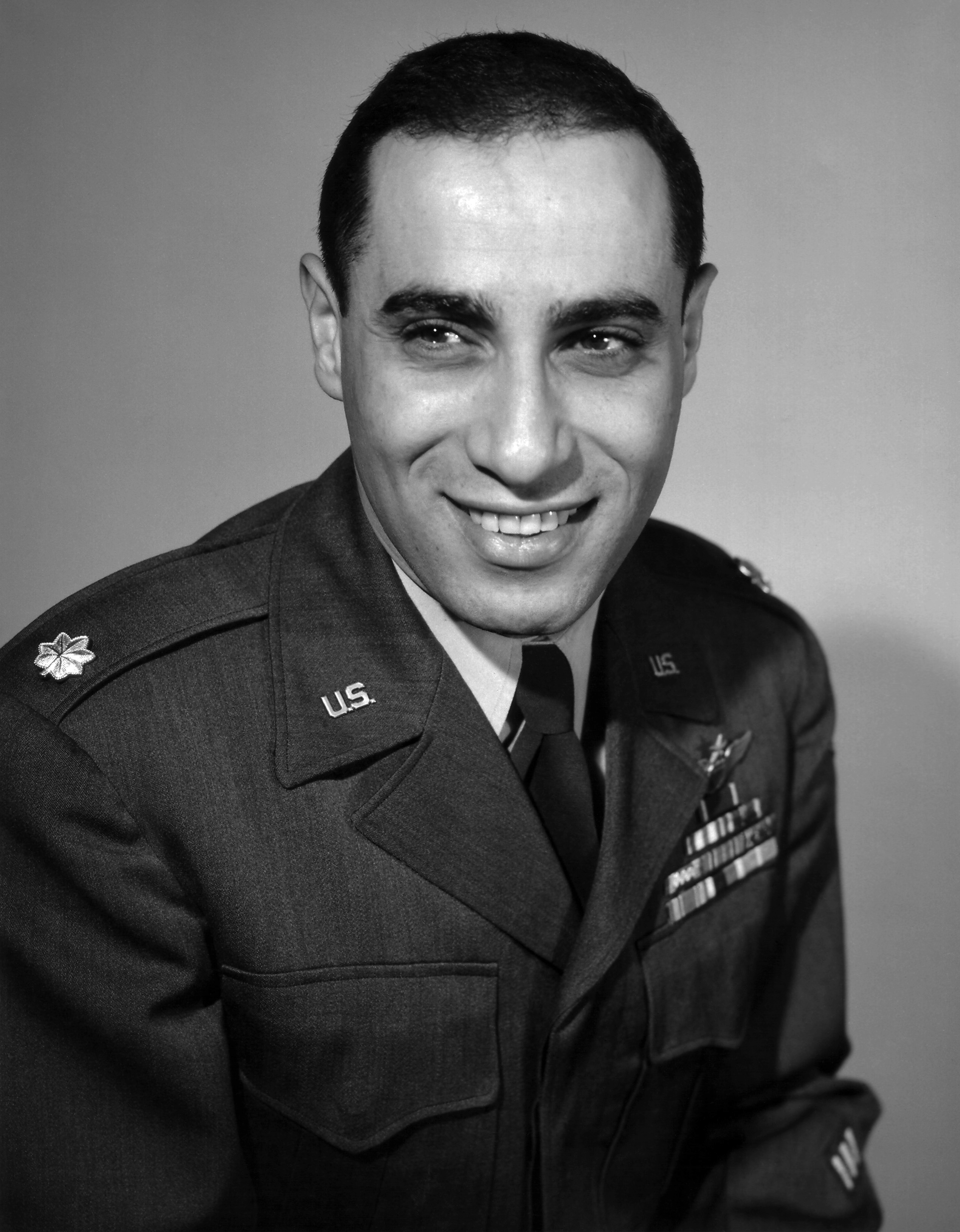
James Jabara, Korean War Ace

The Jabara Award for Airmanship, named in memory of Colonel James Jabara (1923–1966), is awarded each year to the United States Air Force Academy graduate whose accomplishments demonstrate superior performance in fields directly involved with aerospace vehicles.

With 15 kills, Colonel Jabara was the second leading Air Force ace of the Korean War. Colonel Jabara was the First American Jet Ace. Each year the U.S. Air Force Academy and the Association of Graduates present the Colonel James Jabara Award to an academy graduate or graduates whose airmanship contributions are of great significance and set them apart from their contemporaries.

Air Force Recognition Ribbon

Each major air command, including the Air Force Reserve Command; field operating agency, including the Air National Guard; and direct reporting unit may submit one nomination for the award. The winner of the award is authorized to wear the Air Force Recognition Ribbon.

== Recipients ==
Year	Recipients
1968	Capt Donald D. Stevens, ’60
1969	1st Lt Karl W. Richter, ’64
1969	Major Terry R. Jorris, ’61
1970	Capt Wayne A. Warner, ’63
1971	Capt Neil B. Crist, ’66
1972	Capt R. Stephen Ritchie, ’64
1973	Capt Dale E. Stovall, ’67
1974	Major Robert A. Lodge, ’64
1975	Capt Ronald T. Rand, ’71; Capt Donald R. Backlund, ’71
1976	Lt Col Michael V. Love, ’60
1977	Major Roger E. Carleton, ’67
1978	Lt Col Wayne F. Kendall Jr., ’60
1979	Major M. H. Bushnell, ’64
1980	Colonel Thomas A. LaPlante, ’61
1981	Capt William T. Gillin, ’73
1982	Lt Col Robert L. Brenci, ’63
1983	Major Neal D. Coyle, ’72; Colonel Karol J. Bobko, ’59
1984	Capt Michael P. Davis, ’78
1985	Colonel James N. Allburn, ’63
1986	Major Larry E. Faber, ’73
1987	Capt James A. Trinka, ’78
1988	Major Marc D. Felman, ’76; Capt Thomas M. Ferguson, ’81
1989	Lt Col Robert H. Schnick, ’72
1990	Capt Francis R. Gabreski, ’81
1991	Capt William F. Andrews, ’80
1992	Major Corby L. Martin, ’80
1993	Major Ali C. Frohlich, ’80
1994	Lt Col James A. Sills, ’74
1995	Capt Harold E. Waters, ’85
1996	Lt Col Robert P. Donnelly Jr., ’77
1997	Lt Col David J. Scott, ’78
1998	Capt Daniel E. Flynn, ’91
1999	Major Peter E. Gersten, ’89
2000	Major James L. Cardoso, ’88
2001	Major Julian M. Chesnutt, ’89
2002	Major Henry C. Thompson, ’87
2003	Major Leighton T. Anderson, ’92; Major Edward J. Lengel, ’92
2004	Major Jason L. Hanover, ’92
2005	Lt Col Keith Schultz, ’79
2006	Capt John Vargas, '96
2007	Maj Mark W. Visconi, '93
2008	Capt Jonathan W. Graham, '99
2009	Chesley B. Sullenberger, '73; Capt. Travis A. Burton, '00
2010	Capt Prichard R. Keely, '04
2011	Capt Mike Polidor, '04
2012	Capt Joseph "Drew" Hext, '02
2013	Capt Christopher D. McConnell, '05
2014	Capt Charles Napier, '06
2015	Capt Kyle Babbit, '08
2016	Maj Matthew Kuta, '05
2017	Capt Brian Guyette, '08
2018	Maj Marc Catalano, '06
2019	Col. Tyler "Nick" Hague, '98 Maj. Caitlin T. Reilly, '07
2020	Capt Alexander E. Boules, ’15
2021	Maj. J. Cameron Dilts, '10
2022	Maj Kirby Wedan, '12; Maj Tyler Ringwald, '11; Maj Eric Goral, '10
2023	Maj Richard Yount, '14
