= Doha International Air Base =

Military air base in Doha, Qatar

Doha International Air Base
- Doha, Doha Municipality in Qatar
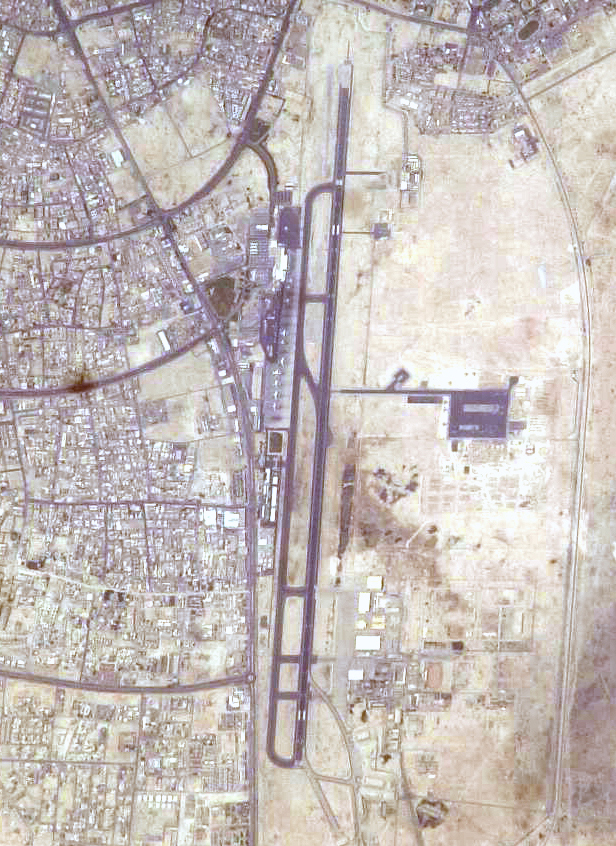

Site information
- Type: Air Base
- Owner: Qatar Armed Forces
- Operator: Qatar Emiri Air Force

Location
- Shown within Qatar
- Coordinates: 25°15′03″N 51°34′25″E

Site history
- Built: 1991
- In use: 1991 - 2004

Airfield information
- Identifiers: IATA: DIA, ICAO: OTBD
Runways
Direction	Length and surface
15/33	3,820 metres (12,533 ft) Concrete

Doha International Air Base (Doha IAB) is an airbase of the Qatar Emiri Air Force located at the Doha International Airport, Doha, Qatar which operated officially from 1991 to 1993 and from 1996 to 2004.

The base was also used by the United States Armed Forces as Camp Snoopy.

== History ==
Soon after the Persian Gulf War in 1991, the United States and Qatar secretly signed a defense cooperation agreement that provided the US Military with ability to set up operations here. Camp Snoopy was one of the bases which would come out of this agreement. The base was closed down as forces withdrew from the Middle East following the Persian Gulf War but was re-opened in 1996.

The year 2000 saw its rapid expansion by the Pennsylvania and Ohio Air National Guard and US Navy Seebees. The development included the addition of constructed 15 force-protection projects, high-security entrance points, kennels, and aircraft maintenance facilities, each made more difficult by the concrete-like bedrock which makes up the deserts of Qatar. The work plan had engineers pouring 650 cubic yards (500 m^{3}) of concrete, moving 10,000 cubic yards (7,600 m^{3}) of desert rock, which took more effort to move compared to the sand that makes up most of the deserts in the region, and erecting 50,000 pounds of steel. The work also included building 32 Scud bunkers, placing five towers, building 180 feet (55 m) of blast wall, constructing a mile of road and digging a mile of trenching. Heat was the common theme throughout the deployment. Doors had to remain closed or temperatures could rise high enough inside to trigger fire-suppression sprinklers; pools had to be chilled before entering. As temperatures soared through the 100s each day, guardsmen devised ways to work through the desert menace. These included 4 a.m. start times and air-conditioned shelters at each job site. In late 2002 a second wave of engineering projects expanded the base further adding some basic comforts to the previously barren camp such as a small swimming pool, trailers replacing tents for the dining facility and the addition of a larger post office to handle the influx of mail that came with the increased number of troops. Prior to the late 2002 build up troops stationed at Camp Snoopy were bused an hour each way to Al Udeid Air Base for basic recreation and exchange use.

In May 2002, Qatar Airways announced the new expansion and renovation plans for the Doha International airport which included reclaiming the real estate on which Camp Snoopy was located. This coupled with the expansion of Al Udeid and the establishment of U.S. bases in Iraq ended the need for Camp Snoopy and it was closed in 2004. One account states that the base was named Snoopy due to the large amount of snooping that was done along the base's perimeter by curious locals from nearby Doha, while another claims it was due to the large number of feral dogs that roamed the base when it was initially established.

=== Mission ===
Camp Snoopy in Doha, Qatar was at its height the largest pre-positioning base outside the United States. A considerable amount of these equipment had been moved from Qatar to Kuwait during the last months before the 2003 invasion of Iraq. Camp Snoopy had stockpiled enough equipment to accommodate a brigade set with two armored and one mechanized battalion, as well as equipment for combat service support units. The troops to use it could be airlifted and ready for action in 96 hours. Unlike Kuwait, advance parties will fly to Qatar, draw the equipment and use commercial heavy equipment transporters to move it to the port to be loaded onto ships for transport to the combat zone. It also served as home for the U.S. Air Force's 64th Air Expeditionary Group, which was enlarged to become the 64th Air Expeditionary Wing prior to the invasion of Iraq. The 64th primarily operated the then brand new C-17 Globemaster III. Snoopy served as the final departure point for personnel and equipment headed for Afghanistan.

In late 2002, due to its location - near enough to Iraq to make for quick turn around but far enough away to not be an easy target - Camp Snoopy was selected to host an Air Force Special Operations Command detachment from operating the Lockheed MC-130 Combat Talon. The addition of the MC-130's and their supporting crews along with a general increase in total manpower led to the redesignation of the 64th from a Group to a Wing in December 2002. Due to limited ramp space the airlift mission was largely shifted to nearby Al Udeid by January 2003 with the main focus becoming the operation of the Special Operations force located there. This would continue until the base was closed in 2004. The base also served as the central mail distribution point for bases in Afghanistan with all mail being delivered to the base, sorted, then placed on aircraft for delivery to individual bases in Afghanistan. During December 2002 this postal hub processed an average of 3,000 pounds of mail a day and operated 24 hours a day. During its operation Doha International Air Base's mailing address was APO AE 09310.

=== Former American Units ===
- 64th Air Expeditionary Group
- The U.S. Army's 260th Quartermaster Battalion and 559th Quartermaster Battalion deployed to Doha IAB in 2002 and 2003.
- Army Materiel Command- Forward, South West Asia was permanently assigned here.

=== Notable personnel ===
- Major General (Then Brig. Gen) Winfield W. Scott III served as commander from March until May 2003

== Current units ==
Structure:

- Flying Wing 1
  - 11 Squadron with the BAE Systems Hawk 167 at RAF Leeming, UK
- Flying Wing 3
  - 8 Anti Surface Vessel Squadron with the NHIndustries NH90
  - 9 Multirole Squadron with the NH90-NFH and the NH90-TTH
  - LifeFlight with the AgustaWestland AW139
  - 41 Squadron with the Boeing AH-64E Apache
