= Attorney General Scott =

Attorney General Scott may refer to:

- Henry Milne Scott (1876–1956), Attorney General of Fiji
- Ian Scott (Ontario politician) (1934–2006), Attorney General of Ontario
- John Scott, 1st Earl of Clonmell (1739–1798), Attorney General for Ireland
- John Scott, 1st Earl of Eldon (1751–1838), Attorney General for England and Wales
- R. Taylor Scott (1834–1897), Attorney General of Virginia
- Thomas Scott (Canadian judge) (1746–1824), Attorney General of Upper Canada
- William J. Scott (Illinois politician) (1926–1986), Attorney General of Illinois

== See also ==
- General Scott (disambiguation)
