= James Jabara =

American flying ace

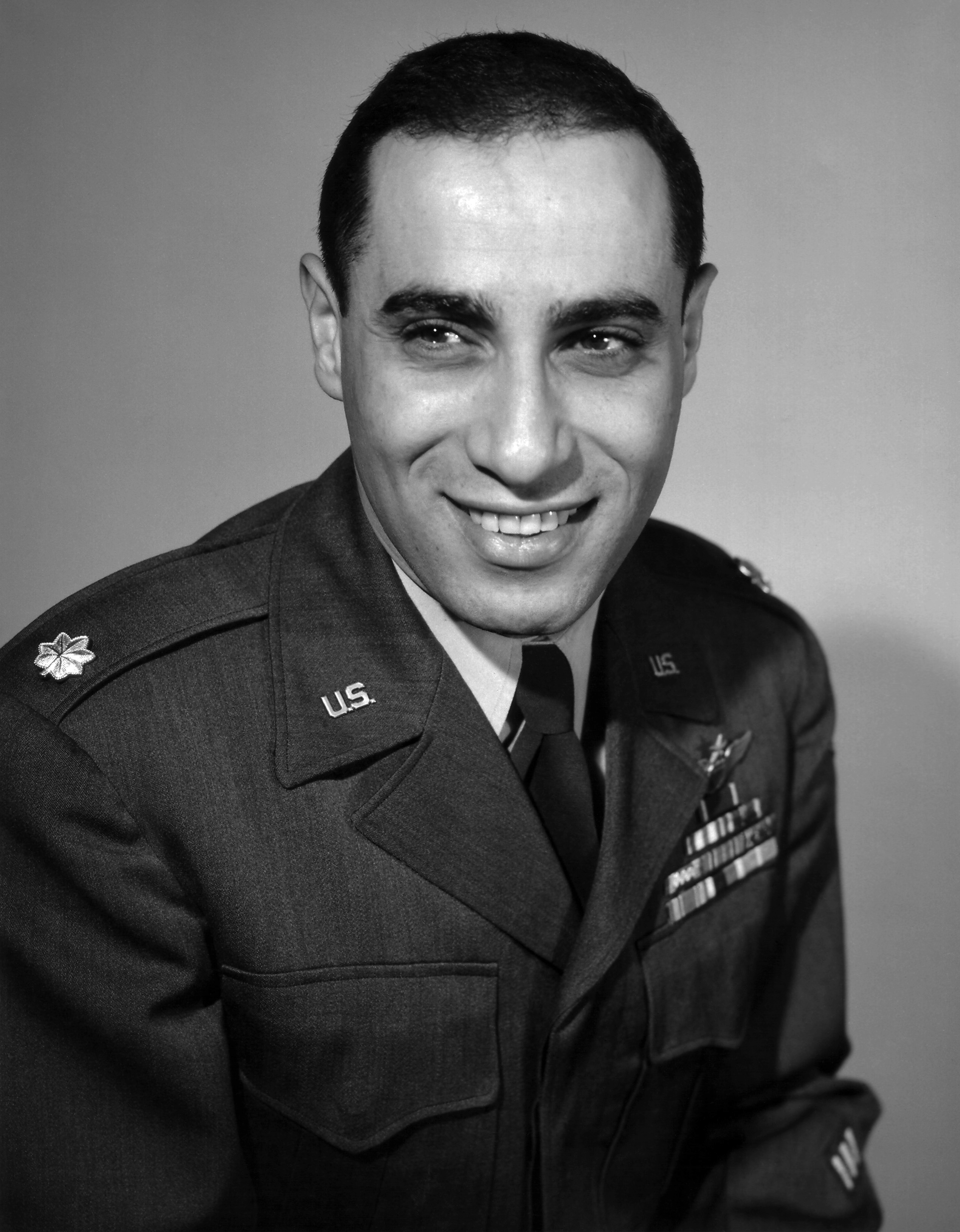
- (c.1950s)
- Born: 10 October 1923; Muskogee, Oklahoma, U.S.
- Died: 17 November 1966 (aged 43); Delray Beach, Florida, U.S.
- Burial place: Arlington National Cemetery
- Military career
- Allegiance: United States of America
- Branch: United States Army Air Forces; United States Air Force
- Service years: 1943–1966
- Rank: Colonel
- Nicknames: "Jabby", "The Ceegar Kid"
- Commands: 31st Tactical Fighter Wing; 337th Fighter-Interceptor Squadron
- Conflicts: World War II; Korean War; Vietnam War
- Awards: Distinguished Service Cross; Silver Star (2); Distinguished Flying Cross (7); Air Medal (24); British Distinguished Flying Cross

James "Jabby" Jabara (10 October 1923 – 17 November 1966) was the first American and United States Air Force jet ace. Born in Oklahoma, he lived in Kansas where he enlisted as an aviation cadet at Fort Riley after graduating from high school. Jabara attended four flying schools in Texas before he received his pilot's wings and was commissioned as a second lieutenant. Jabara flew two tours of combat duty in Europe during World War II as a North American P-51 Mustang pilot, and scored 1.5 air victories against German aircraft.

Jabara flew his first jet aircraft in 1948, the USAF Lockheed F-80 Shooting Star before transitioning to the USAF North American F-86 Sabre. Jabara used this aircraft to shoot down multiple Soviet-built MiG-15 jets during the Korean War. He achieved his first confirmed air victory of the war on 3 April 1951. A month later he was credited with his fifth and sixth victories, making him the first American jet ace in history. He eventually scored 15 victories, giving him the title of "triple ace". Jabara was ranked as the second-highest-scoring U.S. ace of the Korean War. He received the Distinguished Service Cross, Silver Star, Distinguished Flying Cross, Air Medal, and the British Distinguished Flying Cross for his accomplishments in combat.

Jabara next held a series of commands at various Air Force bases across the United States. He flew the Lockheed F-104 Starfighter and later the Convair B-58 Hustler. In 1966, while on leave from service in Vietnam, Colonel Jabara was traveling with his family in two cars to their new home when his daughter crashed the car she was driving and he was riding in, killing them both. They were buried together at Arlington National Cemetery. In recognition of his contributions to military aviation, an airport outside of Wichita, Kansas was named in his honor. Each year the United States Air Force Academy alumni association bestows the Jabara Award upon an Academy graduate whose aerospace accomplishments demonstrate superior performance.

== Early life ==
Jabara was born in Muskogee, Oklahoma, of Lebanese descent; his father, John, and mother came from Marjayoun, a town in Southern Lebanon.

Jabara joined the Boy Scouts, eventually becoming an Eagle Scout. At an early age, he was set on becoming a pilot, "I used to read articles about [Eddie] Rickenbacker and all these novels you read about air combat, and I guess from the sixth grade it was my ambition to be a fighter pilot." He worked at his parents' grocery store and graduated from Wichita North High School in Wichita, Kansas in May 1942. Standing five feet, five inches (165 cm) tall, Jabara was short for a potential fighter pilot (and was reportedly required to wear corrective eyewear), but this did not prevent him from immediately enlisting as an aviation cadet of the United States Army Air Forces at Fort Riley, Kansas. In an attempt to improve his eyesight for flying, he ate 20 carrots a day in the mistaken belief that this would improve his vision. After attending four flying schools in Texas, he received his pilot's wings and a commission as second lieutenant at Moore Field, Texas in October 1943. Jabara with his wife, Nina, had four children: James William (b. 1949), Carol Ann (b. 1950), Cathy (b. 1952), and Jeanne (b. 1957).

== World War II ==
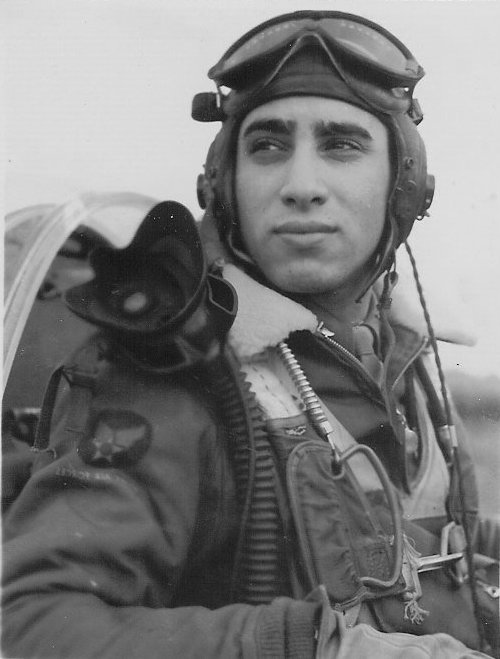
Jabara sitting in the cockpit of his P-51 during World War II c. 1944

During World War II, the Allied forces fought German aircraft across the European Theater. The Allies used several fighter aircraft, including the North American P-51 Mustang. Jabara was assigned to two tours of combat duty as a P-51 pilot across Europe. His first tour lasted from January to October 1944 with the 363d Fighter Group of the Ninth Air Force. On his first mission he was assigned to attacking German railroad targets in Belgium. In a March 1944 mission while Jabara was escorting bombers to Germany, a German pilot shot off his canopy. Although he faced below freezing temperatures at the high altitude, he was able to shoot down a German aircraft before returning to base. During one mission, while in formation, he and another P-51 pilot collided in midair. They both safely bailed out while the aircraft were destroyed. In another incident, while Jabara engaged a German aircraft, they collided in mid-air, and when both pilots safely floated to the ground, they met and shook hands. When Jabara's first tour ended, he returned to the United States as an instructor for other pilots. He returned to Europe again for his second tour from February to December 1945 with the 355th Group of the Eighth Air Force. During his European combat (and known then as "the Ceegar Kid" for his penchant for smoking cigars), Jabara flew 108 combat missions. He was credited with the destruction of one and a half German aircraft in aerial combat (the half considered shared with another pilot) and four on the ground. He received a Distinguished Flying Cross with one Oak Leaf Cluster for his 1.5 victories as well as an Air Medal with 18 Oak Leaf Clusters.

After World War II, Jabara considered leaving the military to attend college, but later decided to attend the Tactical Air School at Tyndall Air Force Base, Florida. From 1947 to 1949 he was stationed on Okinawa with the 53d Fighter Group. At Okinawa in 1948, Jabara flew his first jet aircraft, the Lockheed F-80 Shooting Star. Reflecting on the transition to jet aircraft, he said "It was entirely different. I was at 10,000 feet before I remembered to raise my landing gear. ... It was so quiet and fast. ... I guess that was probably the happiest moment of my life." Jabara returned to the United States and was assigned as a flight commander, now at the rank of captain, with the 4th Fighter-Interceptor Wing, flying the newly operational North American F-86 Sabre jet fighter at the New Castle County Airport in Delaware.

== Korean War ==
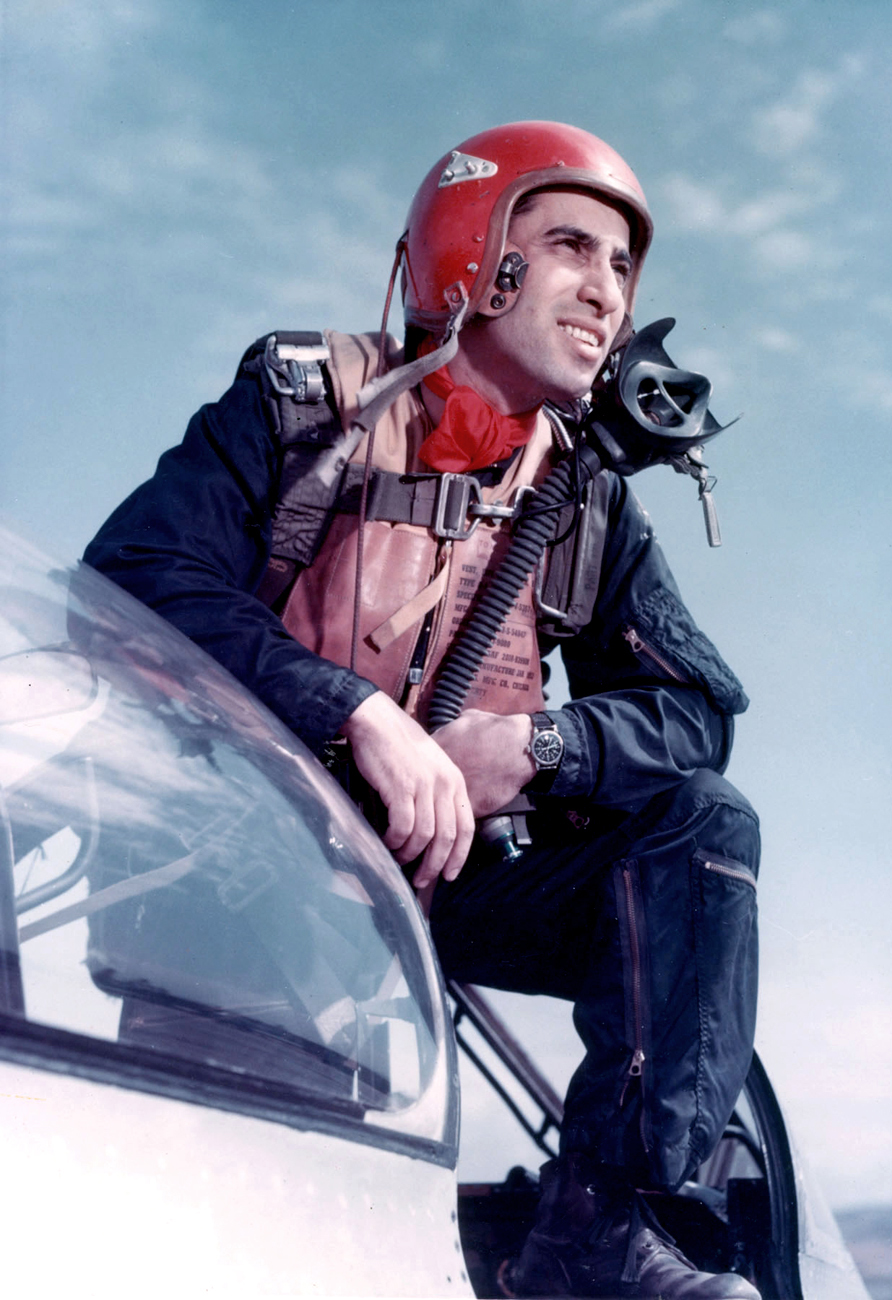
Jabara standing on his F-86 Sabre in April 1953

Before the start of the Korean War, the Korean Peninsula was split by an American-backed government at the south and a Soviet-backed opposing government at the north. Divided by the 38th Parallel, both the United States and the Soviet Union agreed to maintain the division until a mutual decision was made about the future of the peninsula. On 25 June 1950, North Korean troops crossed the parallel and attacked several key South Korean targets. As the United States prepared military assistance with the South Koreans, the Soviet Union also helped the North Koreans by training pilots and providing MiG-15 aircraft. Jabara arrived in Korea on 13 December 1950 with the 334th Fighter-Interceptor Squadron of the 4th Fighter-Interceptor Wing. The squadron was the first F-86 Sabre unit deployed to the Fifth Air Force to counter the threat by the Soviet MiG-15s. By 2 January 1951, he had flown five combat missions in F-86s and had damaged one MiG-15 Korean jet fighter in air combat. Jabara achieved his first confirmed victory on 3 April 1951 when 12 F-86 Sabres took on 12 MiG-15s in MiG Alley, a region in northwestern North Korea. He was credited with another on 10 April, a third on 12 April, and a fourth on 22 April- the fifth of his career making him an ace. Jabara voluntarily transferred to the 335th Fighter-Interceptor Squadron when the 334th was rotated back to the United States.

This [air combat] is just business. It's what we're trained for—just like you might be trained for any business.

— James Jabara, reflecting on his combat victories

On 20 May, two flights of F-86 Sabres encountered multiple MiG-15s in MiG Alley, and through radio communications, two additional flights of F-86 Sabres joined the battle, including Jabara. In preparation for the oncoming battle, Jabara and the other F-86 Sabre pilots were ordered to jettison their auxiliary fuel tanks to improve their maneuverability. Jabara's right fuel tank failed to separate from his wing, and protocol required he return to base as the aircraft would be impeded by the extra weight and imbalance, and limit his potential to match off with a MiG. However, with his desire to become a jet ace, Jabara decided to continue to the air battle, where he was able to still handle his aircraft well enough to be credited with shooting down two MiG-15s with .50 caliber machine gun fire. The first was in a group of three MiGs and the other was the last in a six-plane group. Jabara was able to see the first aircraft explode from his gunfire, but he only saw his second victory go into a tailspin as he was avoiding being targeted by another MiG. His fifth and sixth victories made Jabara the first American in history to use jet aircraft to become an ace. The Americans said the 20-minute air battle had included 36 F-86 Sabres against nearly 50 MiG-15s (Russian data shows 30 MiGs), and the American pilots recorded Jabara's two victories and another pilot's "probable". While returning to base, Jabara's F-86 Sabre was so low on fuel, he turned off the engine and glided towards the base before turning it on prior to landing. Data-matching with Soviet records made available since the end of the Cold War has since shown that only one MiG was lost in the combat, and that Jabara's jet-versus-jet tally was four at best. According to Soviet records he did not become an ace till his second combat tour in 1953. Jabara later stated in an interview, "That was my bag for the day, and it made me feel pretty good to know that I was the first jet ace in the history of aerial warfare [sic]." The mission was his 63rd Korean mission of an eventual 163; he was awarded a Distinguished Service Cross, the nation's second-highest decoration.

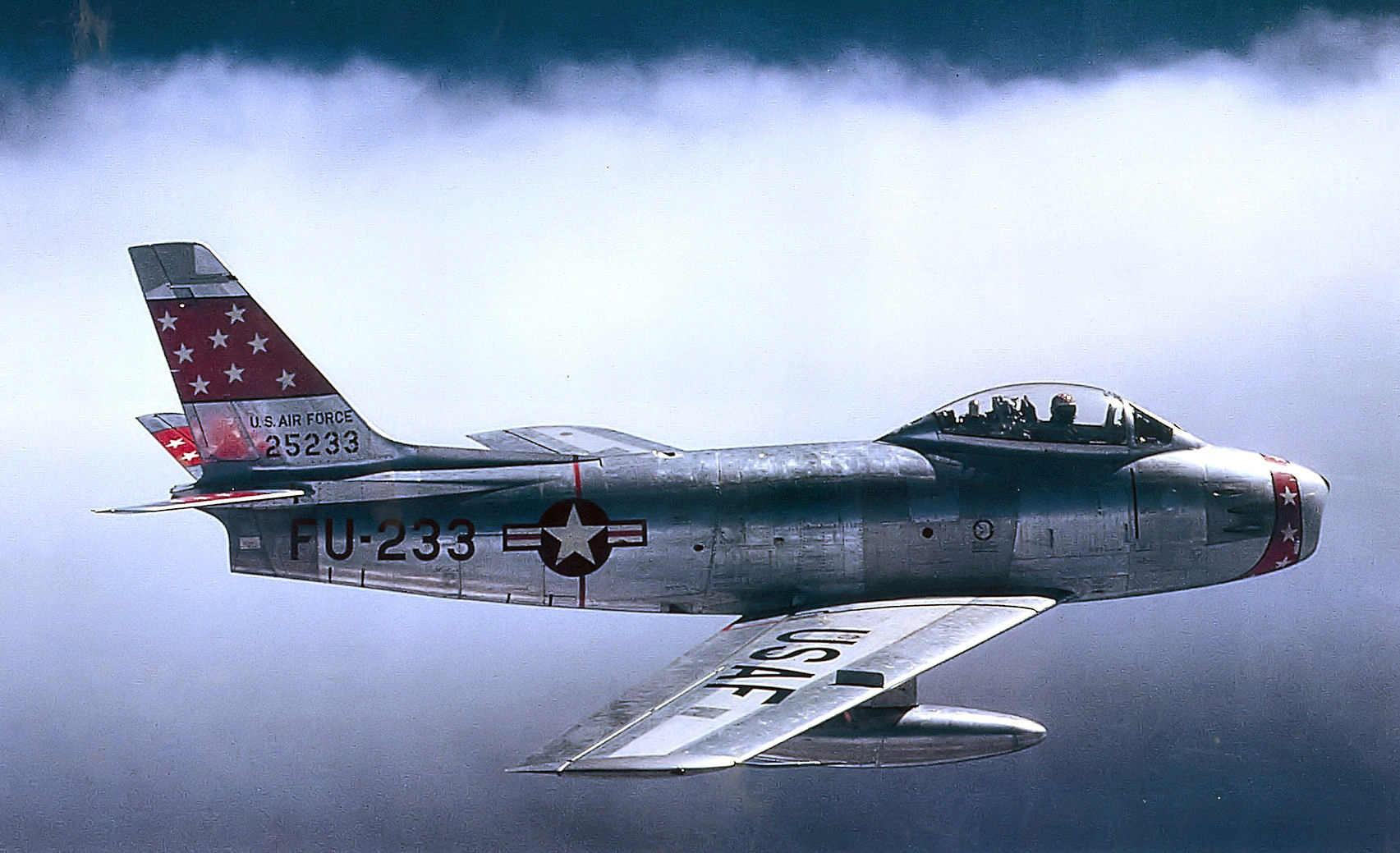
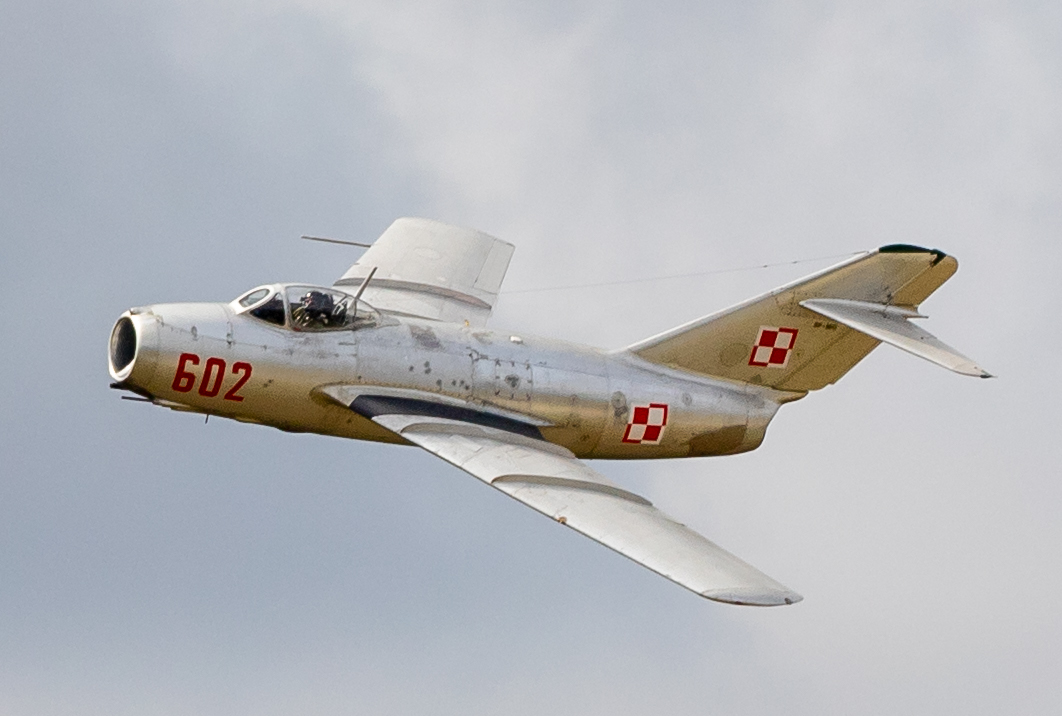
The F-86 Sabre (left), flown by Jabara, was used to shoot down all of his 15 MiG-15 (right) air victories of the Korean War.

Against his wishes, Jabara received a stateside leave for a publicity tour. The Jabara family grocery store in Wichita was thronged with people for days, and both he and his father John appeared on local and national radio and television. Wichita mounted one of its most-attended parades in the city's history. Jabara was even sent on a goodwill tour with his father through the Middle East, and gave a speech in his father's hometown of Marjayoun, Lebanon. Film newsreels included footage of his aircraft and other accolades included his own song ("That Jabara Bird") and a ritual rewarding of his Distinguished Service Cross at a Boston baseball game. Jabara returned to the United States in May 1952 for temporary assignment to Air Force Headquarters, Washington, D.C. Two months later he was transferred to the Air Training Command at Scott Air Force Base, Illinois. Upon his request, he returned for another tour of duty overseas, arriving in Korea in January 1953.

By then a major, on his second tour, Jabara was credited with shooting down nine more MiGs for a total of 15 victories. On 16 May 1953 he recorded his seventh victory, and on 26 May he shot down two additional MiGs for a total of nine for the war. On 10 June, Jabara shot down two more MiGs. Eight days later his flight group encountered four MiGs, and he encountered mechanical problems that nearly caused his aircraft to crash into an elevated hill. After resolving his aircraft's issues, he returned to the battle and was able to shoot down an already damaged MiG. On 30 June, his first of two missions for the day resulted in one MiG victory. The second mission involved escorting F-86 Sabre fighter-bombers and he shot down a MiG before he came under heavy fire by other MiGs. In an attempt to evade their attack, he quickly accelerated but his engine flamed out. He maneuvered his aircraft for the ocean for a potential water rescue if he crashed, but he was able to restart the engine and return to base. Jabara recorded his final victory on 15 July. Two days later he flew his last two missions, and although he was eager to find more MiGs in an attempt to tie or surpass Joseph C. McConnell's 16 air victories, he did not see any opposing aircraft. His 15 victories gave him the title of "triple ace", and his Korean War victories were all against MiG-15s. He received a Silver Star, as well as another Distinguished Flying Cross for his additional air victories. During the Korean War, Jabara was second in American air victories to McConnell, who recorded 16. The Soviet Union had four other pilots who credited as having exceeded or tied Jabara's victories: Yevgeny Pepelyaev with 21 to 23, Nikolai Sutyagin with 21 to 22, and both Alexander Smorchkov and Lev Schukin with 15.

== After Korea ==
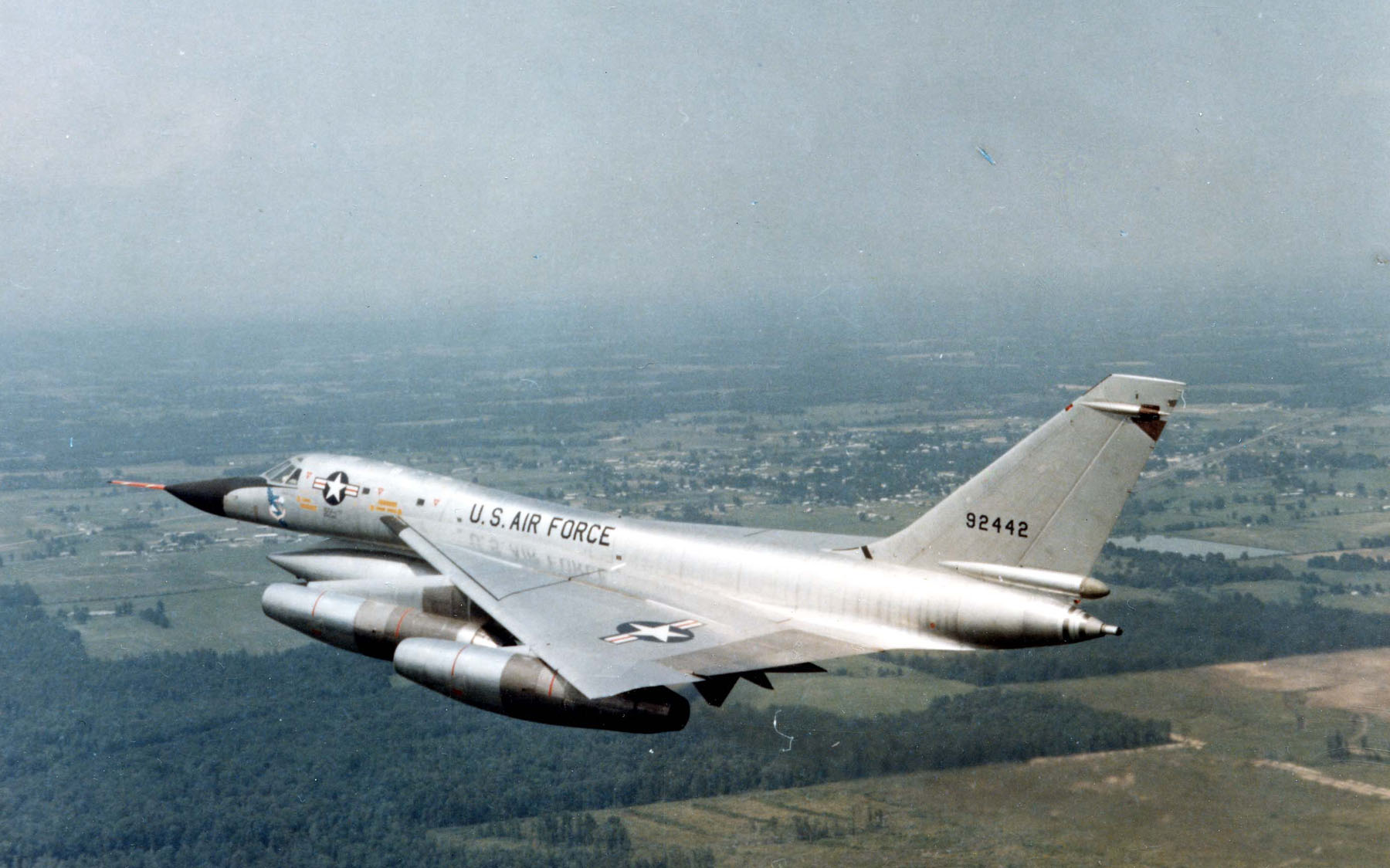
In one of Jabara's assignments after the Korean War, he piloted the Convair B-58 Hustler, the first supersonic bomber

Jabara returned to the United States in July 1953, and was assigned as commander of the 4750th Training Squadron at Yuma Air Force Base (later renamed Vincent AFB), Arizona. By January 1957 Jabara was at Eglin Air Force Base, Florida to join the 3243rd Test Group to test Lockheed F-104 Starfighters. He was first reassigned to Headquarters of the 32d Air Division at Syracuse, New York, then assumed command of the 337th Fighter-Interceptor Squadron at Westover Air Force Base, Massachusetts. In 1958 - 1959, Jabara flew combat missions over Taiwan in the F-104 Starfighter.

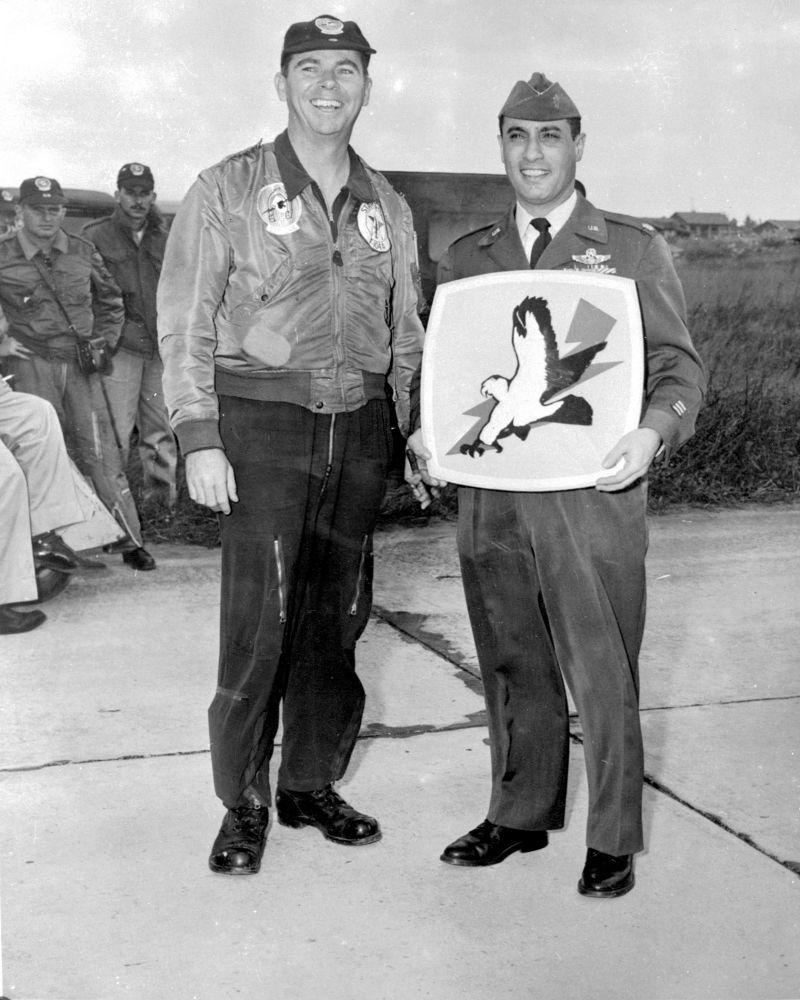
The 337th Fighter-Interceptor Squadron succeeds the 83d Fighter-Interceptor Squadron for Taiwan's air defense, Jabara is on right, on Taoyuan Air Base 1958

From July 1960 to June 1961, he attended and graduated from the Air War College in Montgomery, Alabama. At Carswell Air Force Base, Texas, Jabara piloted the first supersonic bomber, the Convair B-58 Hustler as part of the 43d Bomb Wing. Jabara also helped train NATO pilots on the F-104 Starfighter in July 1964, when he was stationed at Luke Air Force Base, Arizona and he wrote of the aircraft's significant technological improvement over the F-86 Sabre.

In 1965, Jabara was given command of the 31st Tactical Fighter Wing at Homestead Air Force Base, Florida. By 1966 Jabara had risen to the rank of colonel—the youngest at that rank at the time, and he volunteered to fly combat missions for the Vietnam War. He flew his first mission in July 1966, joining an F-100 Super Sabre flight group for a bombing run that damaged several buildings held by the Viet Cong in South Vietnam. He returned on leave to Homestead about a week after the mission.

== Death ==
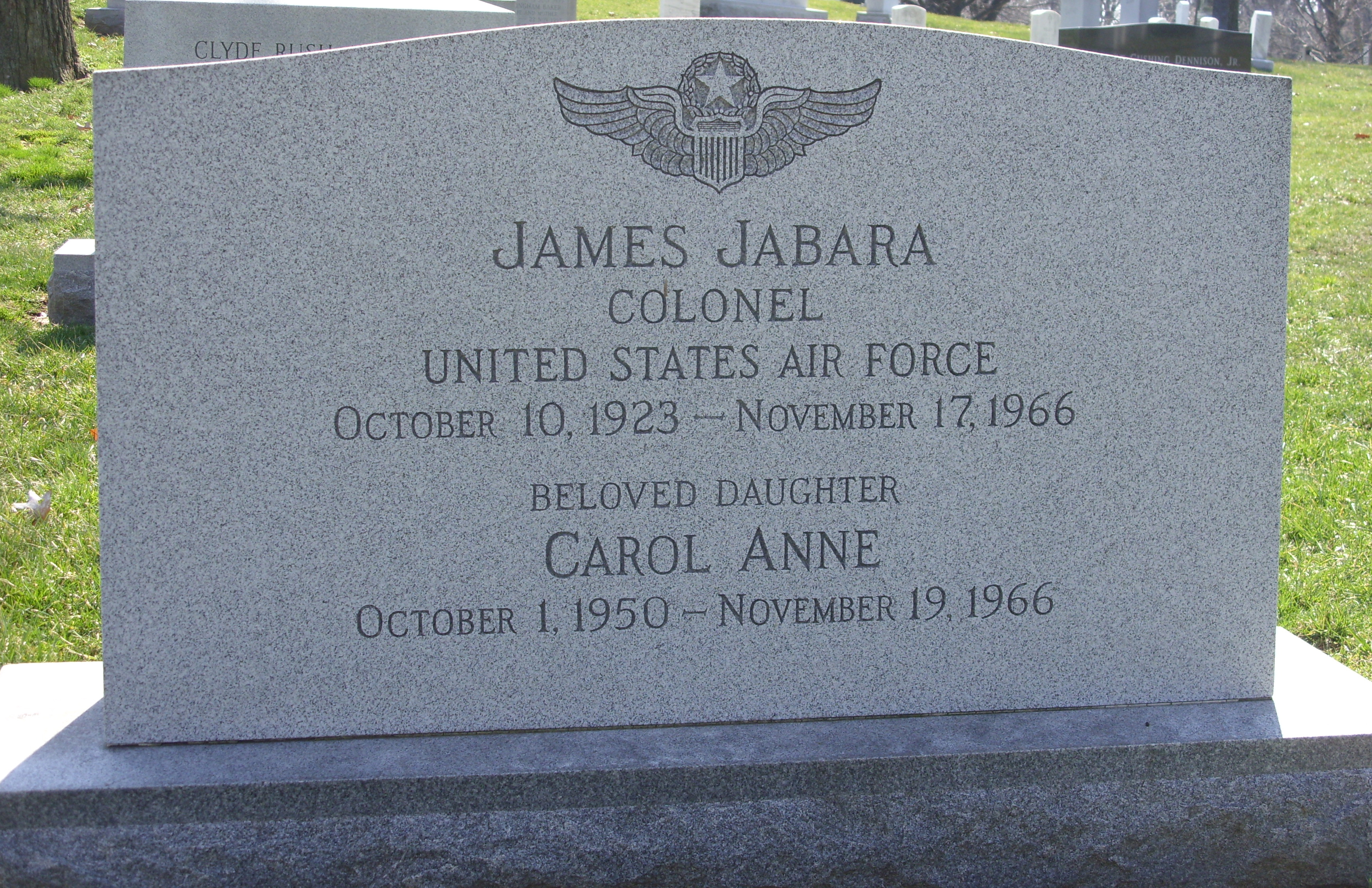
Jabara and his daughter's gravestone at Arlington National Cemetery

While traveling to Myrtle Beach, South Carolina, where his family would stay while he returned to combat in Vietnam, Jabara and his 16-year-old daughter Carol Anne died in a car accident in Delray Beach, Florida, on 17 November 1966. The Jabara family were in two cars that day, on their way to a new home in South Carolina where his wife Nina and their children—James Jr., Carol Anne, Jeanne, and Cathy—would reside during Jabara's combat tour. Carol Anne was driving a Volkswagen with her father as a passenger in the back seat. She lost control of the car going through a construction zone, when she initially veered onto a grass median. She swerved back onto the highway but during the rapid turn, she lost control and the vehicle returned to the median where it rolled several times. Jabara sustained head injuries and was pronounced dead on arrival at a Delray hospital, and Carol Anne died two days later. A memorial service was held for Jabara at Homestead Air Force Base with a missing man formation fly-by. Jabara and his daughter were buried together in a single grave at Arlington National Cemetery.

His grandson, 2d Lt Nicholas Jabara, USAF, a 2001 graduate of the United States Air Force Academy, was killed during pilot training in a T-37 accident at Laughlin AFB, Texas on 31 January 2002.

== Legacy ==
An airport just northeast of Wichita, Kansas, was named the Colonel James Jabara Airport in his honor. Each year since 1968, the United States Air Force Academy alumni association bestows the Jabara Award upon the Academy graduate whose accomplishments demonstrate superior performance in fields directly involved with aerospace vehicles. The James Jabara Memorial Foundation was founded by a friend of Jabara, and the foundation constructed a statue of him at the Air Force Academy in Colorado Springs, Colorado in 2004.

In 1950, the Air Force Association (AFA) named him "Most Distinguished Aviator of the Year" and in 1957, was named by AFA as one of 25 U.S. men "who had done the most to promote aviation through the years". The Kansas Aviation Museum named him to the Kansas Aviation Hall of Fame in 2006.

== Awards and decorations ==
During World War II, Colonel Jabara was awarded the Distinguished Flying Cross with one Oak Leaf Cluster and the Air Medal with 23 Oak Leaf Clusters. While in Korea he received the Distinguished Service Cross and another Oak Leaf Cluster for his Distinguished Flying Cross. He was also awarded the Silver Star for two missions flown on 10 and 12 April 1951, where he shot down two MiGs while defending American bombers. He received the Distinguished Service Cross for shooting down his fifth and sixth MiG victories on 20 May 1951. Another Silver Star was received in 1953 with an Oak Leaf Cluster. The United Kingdom awarded him the British Distinguished Flying Cross for his accomplishments in combat on 1 December 1955.

Command Pilot
Distinguished Service Cross
Silver Star (with Oak Leaf Cluster)	Distinguished Flying Cross (with 6 Oak Leaf Clusters and "V" Device)	Air Medal (with 20 Oak Leaf Clusters)
Air Medal (with 3 Oak Leaf Clusters)	Air Force Commendation Medal	Presidential Unit Citation
American Campaign Medal	European-African-Middle Eastern Campaign Medal (with 4 Service Stars)	World War II Victory Medal
Army of Occupation Medal	National Defense Service Medal (with Service Star)	Korean Service Medal (with 3 Service Stars)
Vietnam Service Medal	Air Force Longevity Service Award (with four Oak Leaf Clusters)	Marksmanship Ribbon
Distinguished Flying Cross (British)	Republic of Korea Presidential Unit Citation	Vietnam Gallantry Cross Unit Citation
United Nations Korea Medal	Vietnam Campaign Medal (with Silver 1960– Device)	Korean War Service Medal

== See also ==
- List of Korean War air aces
