= 11 Squadron (Qatar) =

Flying squadron of the Qatar Emiri Air Force

11 Squadron QEAF
- Active: 2021 – Present
- Country: Qatar; United Kingdom
- Branch: Qatar Emiri Air Force; Royal Air Force
- Type: Joint Qatari/British training squadron
- Role: Advanced fast jet flying training
- Home station: RAF Leeming
- Aircraft: BAE Systems Hawk Mk.167

11 Squadron is a flying squadron of the Qatar Emiri Air Force (QEAF). The squadron most recently reformed in November 2021 as a joint QEAF/Royal Air Force squadron. It is currently based at RAF Leeming, North Yorkshire, in the United Kingdom and operates nine BAE Systems Hawk Mk.167s. The unit provides advanced and high-speed jet training for both QEAF and RAF pilots.

== History ==
=== Close Air Support ===
11 Squadron was originally formed in 1984 as 11 (Close Air Support) Squadron at Doha International Air Base, Doha, operating six Dassault Alpha Jet Es. In 2017, the Qatar Emiri Air Force placed an order for six BAE Systems Hawk Advanced Jet Trainers, followed by an extra three in 2018, as a replacement for the Alpha Jet.

=== Training ===
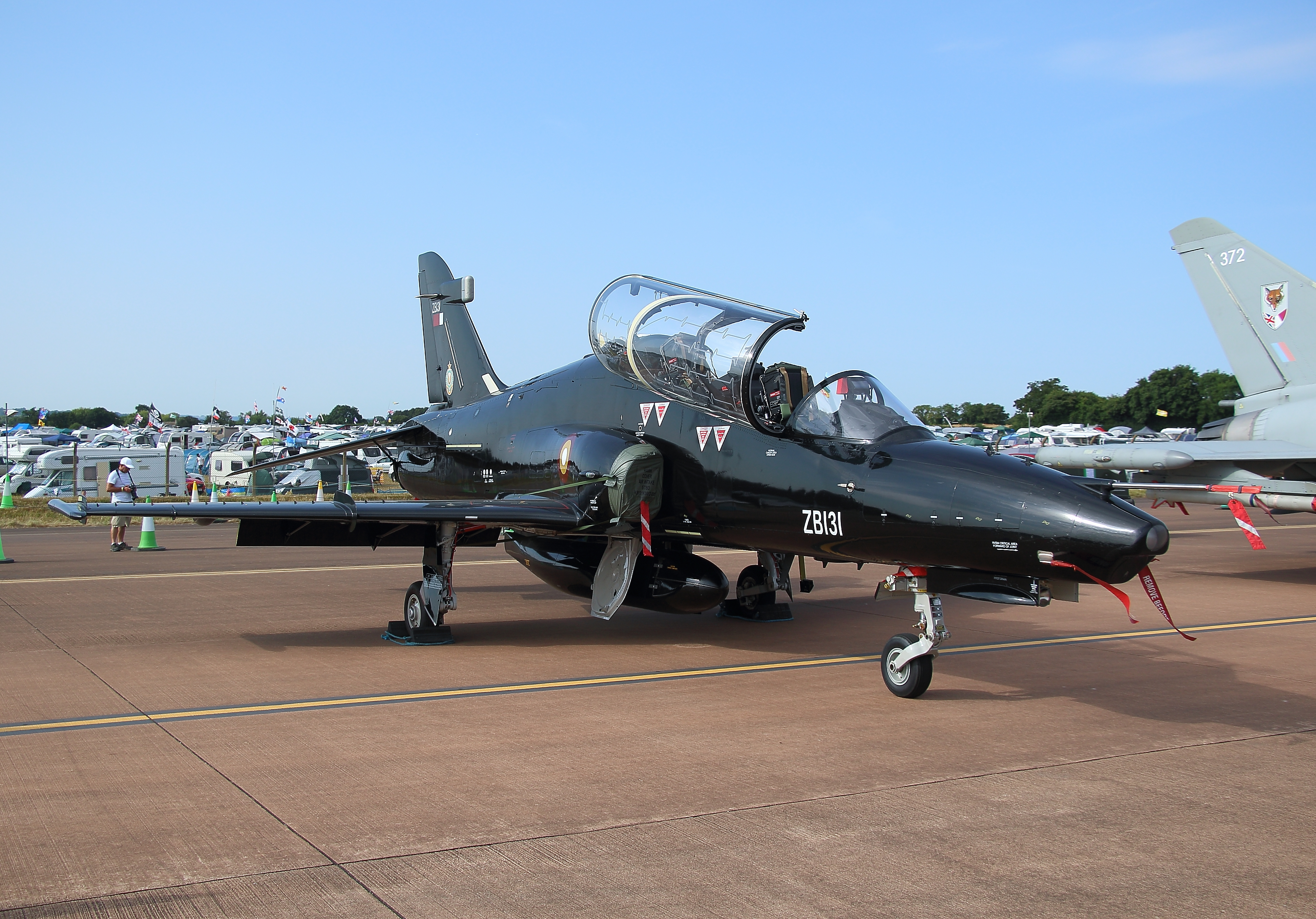
BAE Systems Hawk Mk.167 ZB131 at RIAT, 2022.

In October 2020, British Secretary of State for Defence Ben Wallace and Qatari Minister for Defence Affairs Khalid bin Mohammad Al Attiyah agreed to establish Qatar's new Hawk squadron at an RAF station as a joint Qatari-British unit. This Joint Hawk Squadron was to be based upon similar lines as No. 12 Squadron of the Royal Air Force, which reformed as a joint RAF-QEAF squadron to train Qatari pilots on the Eurofighter Typhoon in 2018. On 1 April 2021, it was announced the Joint Hawk Squadron would be based at RAF Leeming, North Yorkshire, in the United Kingdom. On 1 September 2021, the first two Hawk Mk.167s (ZB131 and ZB133) for the Joint Hawk Squadron were delivered to RAF Leeming. The first four QEAF pilots began training in October 2021, with RAF student pilots planned to start their training with the unit in 2022. On 24 November 2021, the Joint Hawk Squadron was formally given the numberplate of 11 Squadron (Qatar) when it reformed at RAF Leeming.

11 Squadron received its full complement of nine Hawk Mk.167s when the last two (ZB138 and ZB139) were delivered to Leeming on 29 September 2022. The first batch of Qatari students graduated in November 2022.
