= Dukhan / Tamim Airbase =

Military air base in Al-Shahaniya, Qatar

Dukhan / Tamim Airbase
- Dukhan, Al-Shahaniya in Qatar

Site information
- Owner: Qatar Armed Forces
- Operator: Qatar Emiri Air Force

Location
- Shown within Qatar
- Coordinates: 25°28′02″N 51°00′05″E

Site history
- Built: 2018
- In use: 2019 - present

Airfield information
Runways
| Direction | Length and surface |
|---|---|
| 16L/34R | 3,750 metres (12,303 ft) Concrete |
| 16R/34L | 3,750 metres (12,303 ft) Concrete |

Dukhan / Tamim Airbase is a new air base built for the Qatar Emiri Air Force in 2018 near Dukhan. The facility's name is in honour of the Emir of Qatar Tamim bin Hamad Al Thani. It is the country's third and newest air base. The facility is not Dukhan Airport, a civilian airport built in 1930 and made obsolete in 1959 when Doha International Airport was opened.

The airbase received five of the air force's order of 36 Dassault Rafale jet fighters in June 2019, though the base was not completely operational at the time.
