= Qatar Emiri Air Force =

Aerial warfare branch of the Qatar Armed Forces

- القوات الجوية الأميرية القطرية
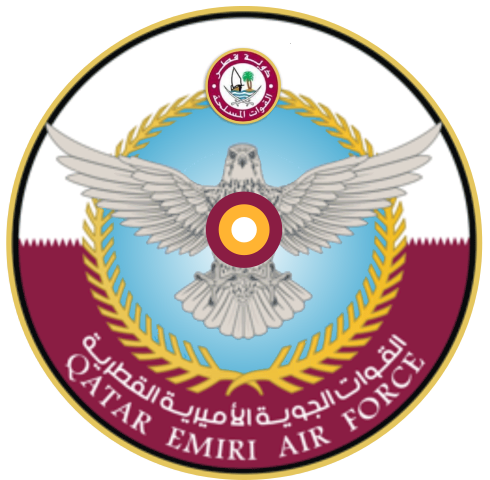
- Seal of the Qatar Emiri Air Force
- Founded: 1974; 52 years ago
- Country: Qatar
- Type: Air Force
- Role: Aerial Warfare
- Size: 2,000 personnel
- Part of: Qatar Armed Forces
- Garrison/HQ: Al-Udeid Air Base
- Engagements: Gulf War; Syrian Civil War; First Libyan Civil War; Saudi-led intervention in the Yemeni civil war; 2026 Iran War

Commanders
- Chief of the Qatar Emiri Air Force: Major General (Pilot) Mohammed bin Abdullah Al-Dosari

Insignia
- Roundel

- Fin flash

- Ensign

Aircraft flown
- Fighter: Rafale, Typhoon, F-15QA
- Helicopter: NH90, AS350 Écureuil, AW139
- Attack helicopter: AH-64E Apache
- Trainer: Super Mushshak, PC-21, Hawk 167, M-346 Master
- Transport: C-130J-30 Super Hercules, C-17 Globemaster III

The Qatar Emiri Air Force (Arabic: القوات الجوية الأميرية القطرية, romanized: Al-Quwwat Al-Jawiyah Al-Amiriyah Al-Qatariyah) (QEAF) is the air arm of the armed forces of the state of Qatar. It was established in 1974 as a small aerial support wing, although in modern times it has evolved into a potent, well equipped force. The QEAF is headquartered at Al-Udeid Air Base in Doha; the current commander is Major General (Pilot) Mohammed bin Abdullah Al-Dosari.

== History ==
In March 1967, in response to the British announcement that it would withdraw its armed forces from the Persian Gulf, Qatar set up armed forces, creating the Qatar Public Security Forces Air Wing, equipped with two Westland Whirlwind helicopters. In 1971, it acquired a combat capability when it purchased three ex-RAF Hawker Hunter jet fighters, which remained in use until 1981. It was renamed the Qatar Emiri Air Force in 1974.

The air force began a major expansion in 1979, when it ordered six Alpha Jet trainer/light attack aircraft. This was followed by orders for 14 Mirage F1 supersonic jet fighters in 1980, which were delivered between 1980 and 1984. Twelve Gazelle helicopters, armed with HOT anti-tank missiles were received from 1983. Also in 1983, the air force took over the Qatar Police Air Wing.

In 1991, the Qatari Air Force took part in the Gulf War on the side of the allies.

In 2005, the Air Force participated in Exercise Eagle Resolve, along with Qatari medical services and emergency medical teams to build interoperability with their US counterparts. The US 26th Marine Expeditionary Unit took part in this exercise to validate the nation's crisis management plan prior to hosting the 2006 Asian Games.

Other acquisitions have been for an order of 59 AW139 helicopters. The helicopters are used for utility tasks, troop transport, search and rescue, border patrol, special forces operations, and law enforcement. Three additional aircraft were ordered in March 2011 for Medevac services.

By 2010, the Qatar Emiri Air Force's personnel strength was at 2,100 and its equipment included the Mirage 2000-3EDA, the SA 342L Gazelle, and the C-17A Globemaster III. Aircraft either flew out of al-Udeid field or Doha International Airport and received training from British instructors. In January 2011, the Air Force evaluated the Eurofighter Typhoon, the Lockheed Martin F-35 Lightning II, the Boeing F/A-18E/F Super Hornet, the McDonnell Douglas F-15E Strike Eagle and the Dassault Rafale to replace, and significantly expand from, its then-current fighter inventory of twelve Dassault Mirage 2000-5s. In May 2015, the QEAF awarded the contract for 24 Dassault Rafale fighters worth €6.3 billion ($7 billion).

In July 2012, the Qatar Emiri Air Force ordered a complete pilot training system from Pilatus centering upon the PC-21. The package included ground-based training devices, logistical support and maintenance in addition to 24 PC-21 aircraft.

In June 2015, the QEAF ordered four additional C-17s, to supplement the existing four delivered in 2009 and 2012.

In September 2016, the sale of up to 72 F-15QAs to Qatar was submitted to the US Congress for approval. The deal (for 36 planes plus an option for 36 more), valued at US$21.1 billion, was signed in November 2016.

In September 2017, the QEAF ordered 24 Typhoon fighter jets from the UK.

In December 2017, the QEAF ordered 12 additional Rafale fighter jets from France, with an option for 36 more.

In August 2018, Qatar announced the construction of a new air base: Dukhan / Tamim Airbase, named after Emir Tamim bin Hamad Al Thani. In addition to the new air base, Al Udeid Air Base and Doha International Air Base were planned to expand in order to accommodate aircraft on order.

The country includes three different types of fighter jets from three different countries in its fleet, each requiring distinct maintenance and repair contracts, which some have criticized as an unusually complex arrangement for such a small nation. This was a "strategic hedge", but also a significant logistical challenge.

Recent disclosures, the latest of which was published in November 2024, uncovered corruption and bribery related to Qatar's arms contracts over the past decade. Several companies engaged in business partnerships with Qatar have been ordered to pay penalties in connection with bribery charges.

On 10 October 2025, US Secretary of Defense Pete Hegseth announced an agreement with Qatar to establish a QEAF facility at Mountain Home Air Force Base in Idaho. It is planned to host a contingent of F-15QAs.

On 2 March 2026, two Iranian low-flying Su-24 tactical bombers (carrying external ordnance) approached Qatar targeting Al Udeid Air Base and Ras Laffan Industrial City during the 2026 Iran war. After they ignored radio warnings, a QEAF F-15QA shot them down marking the first aerial kills achieved by the Qatar Emiri Air Force. According to a post on social media, footage of the wreckage of one of the attacking Su-24s was released by Al Jazeera on 10 April. The body of one of the pilots of a Su-24, named Brigadier General Majid Kazemi was found and identified via DNA analysis on 29 July 2026 and is said to be returned to Iran. Three Iranian fighter jet pilots were captured by the air force.

== Airbases ==
- Al Udeid Air Base
  - Flying Wing 5 'Ababil'
    - 51st Squadron – 12 × McDonnell Douglas F-15QA Strike Eagle
    - 52nd Squadron – 12 × McDonnell Douglas F-15QA Strike Eagle
    - 53rd Squadron – 12 × McDonnell Douglas F-15QA Strike Eagle
  - Flying Wing 8
    - 10th Transport Squadron – 8 × Boeing C-17 Globemaster III
  - Flying Wing 10
    - 12th Transport Squadron – 4 × C-130/J-30 Super Hercules
  - Flying Wing 3
    - 20th Squadron – 13 × Agusta Westland AW139
    - 21st Squadron – 13 × Agusta Westland AW139
    - 22nd Squadron – 13 × Agusta Westland AW139
- Al Zaeem Mohamed Bin Abdullah Al Attiyah Air College (at Al Udeid Airbase)
    - ?? Squadron – 8 × MFI-395 Super Mushshak
    - 31st Squadron – 24 × Pilatus PC-21
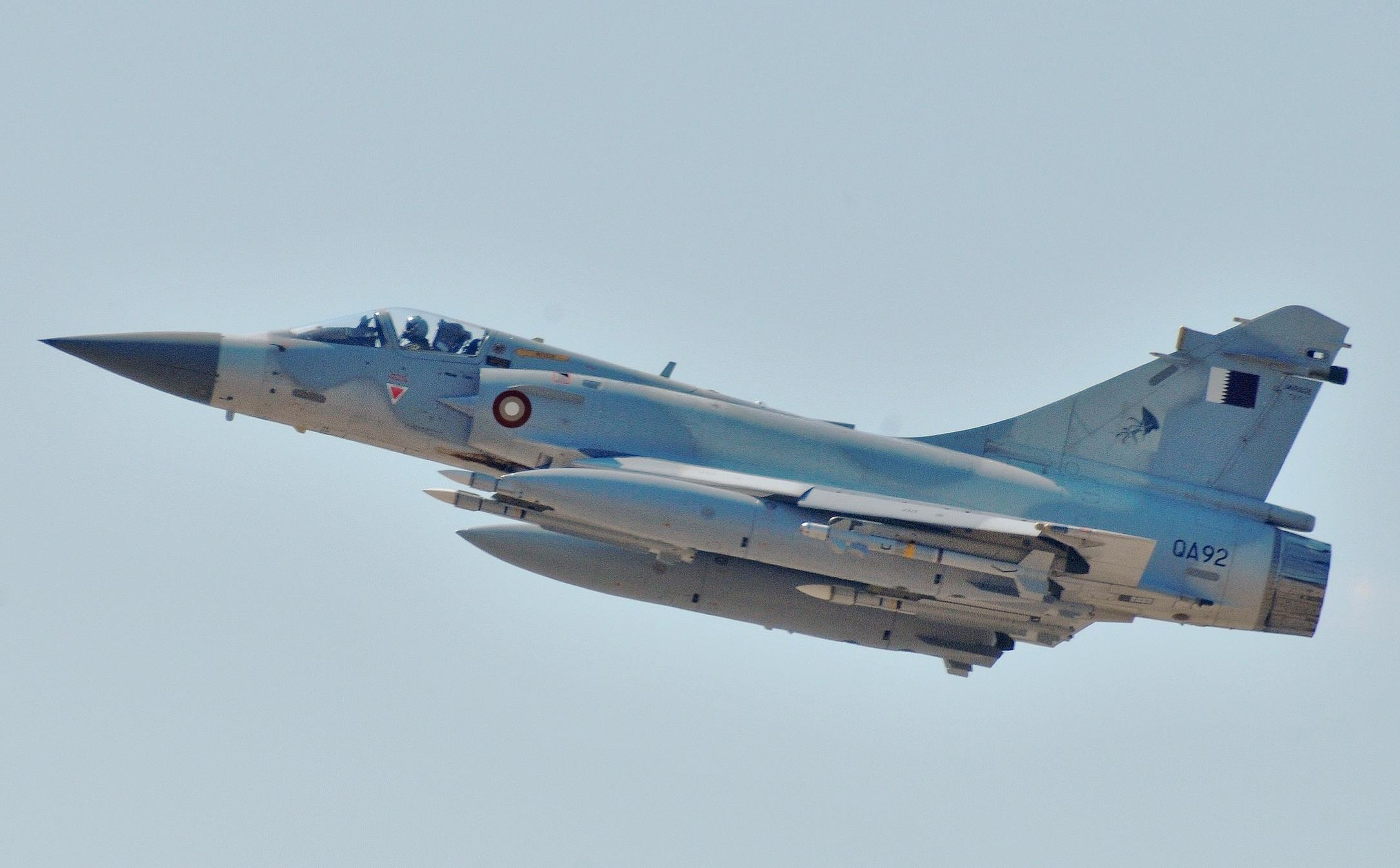
      A Mirage 2000-5 of the QEAF during the 2011 Libya intervention.
    - ?? Squadron – 6 × M-346 Master
- Doha International Air Base (at Doha International Airport)
  - Flying Wing 1
    - 7th Squadron – 12 x Eurofighter Typhoon
    - 12th Squadron - 12 × Eurofighter Typhoon
    - 11th Squadron - Hawk Mk.167
  - Flying Wing 2
    - 6th Squadron – 14 × SA342 Gazelle (to be replaced with 16 x H125)
    - 8th Squadron – NFH90
    - 9th Squadron – NH90
  - Flying Wing 4
    - 41st Squadron – 12 × Boeing AH-64E Apache
    - 42nd Squadron - 12 x Boeing AH-64E Apache
- Dukhan / Tamim Airbase
  - Flying Wing 6 'Al Adiyat'
    - 1st Fighter Squadron – 11 × Dassault Rafale
    - 61st Fighter Squadron – 10 × Dassault Rafale
    - 62nd Fighter Squadron – 10 × Dassault Rafale
- RAF Leeming
  - 11 Squadron – 9 × Hawk Mk.167

== Equipment ==
=== Current aircraft inventory ===
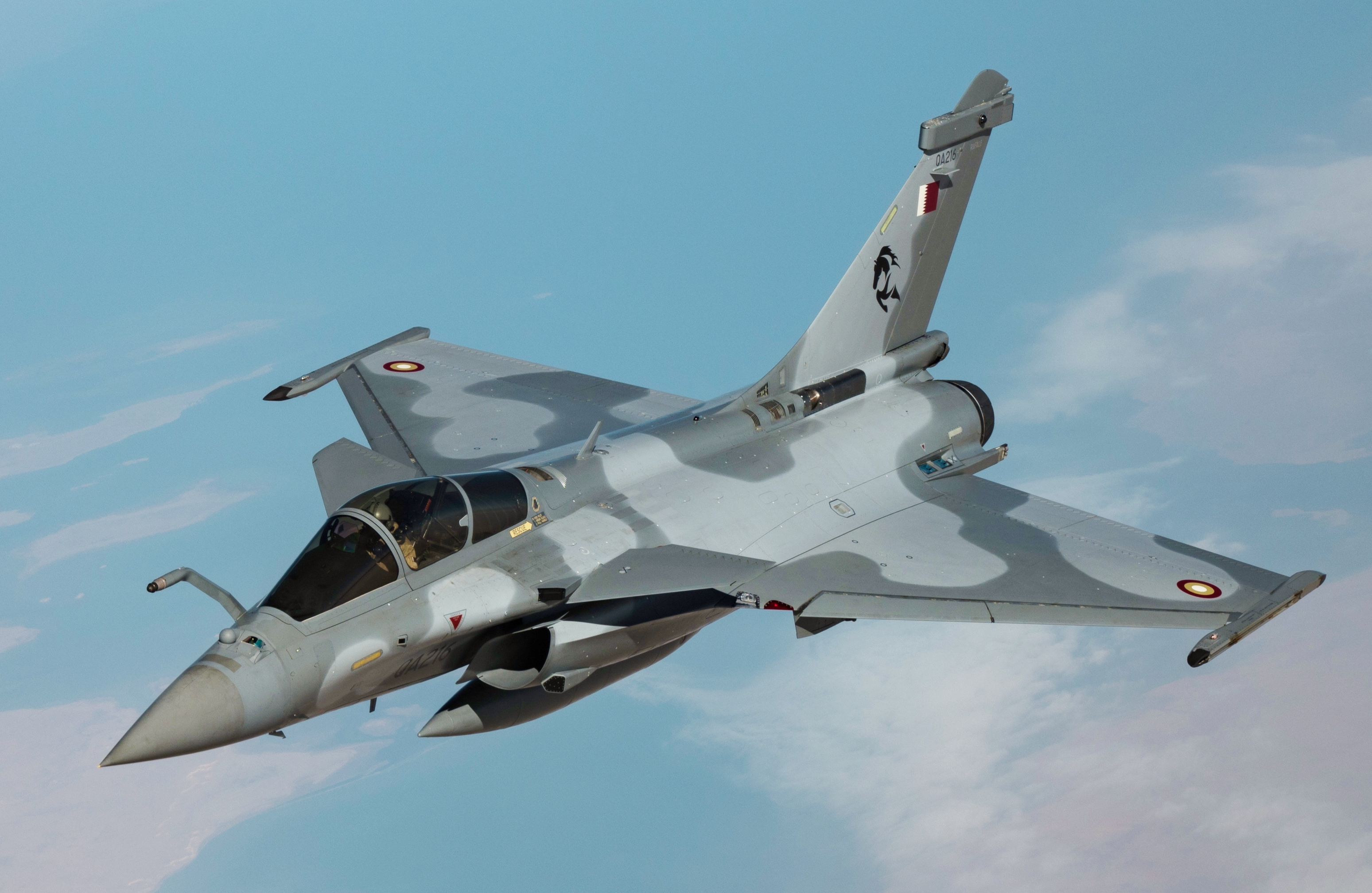
A Rafale fighter aircraft flies above Qatar after receiving fuel

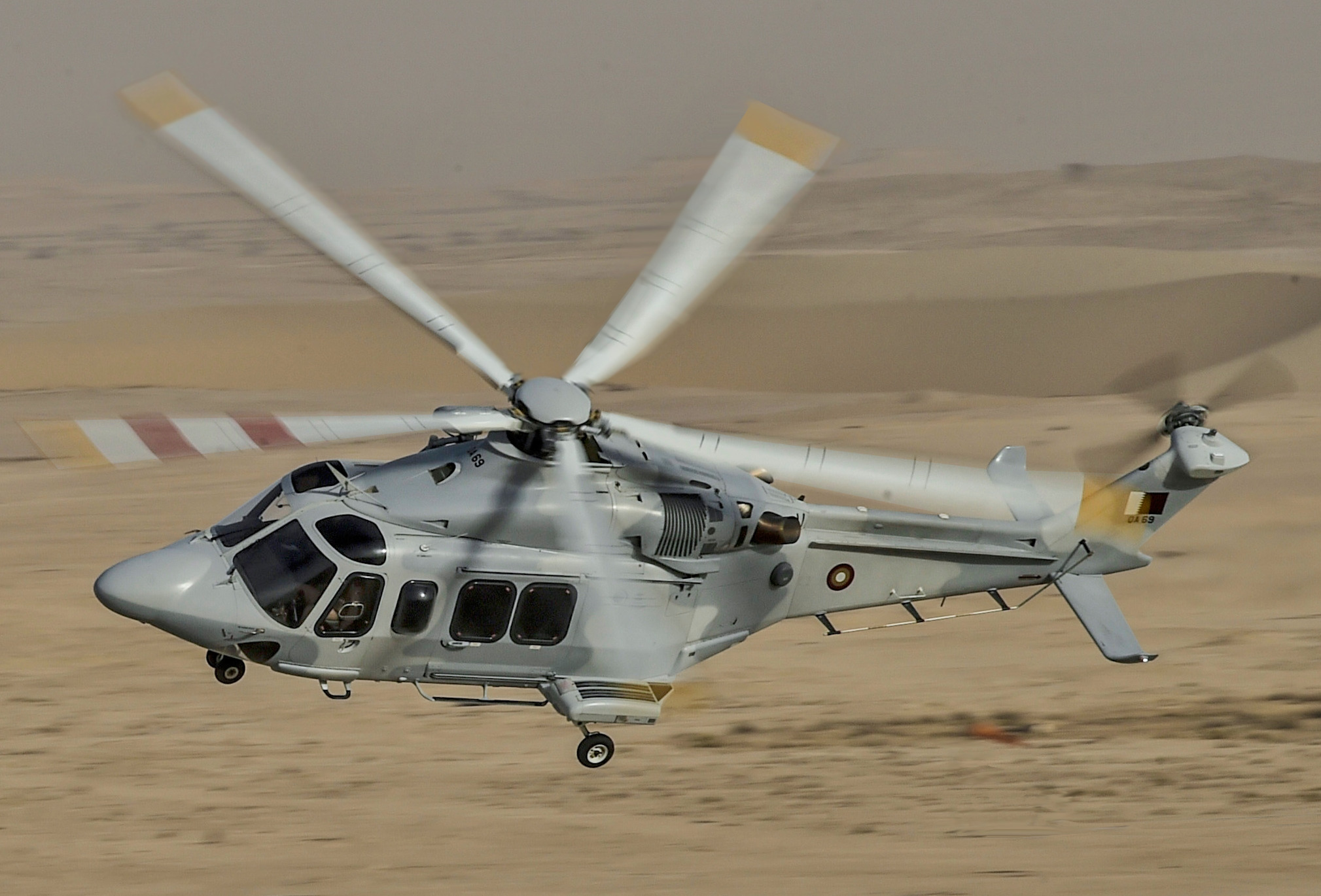
An AW139 flies during the QEAF Lahoub exercise

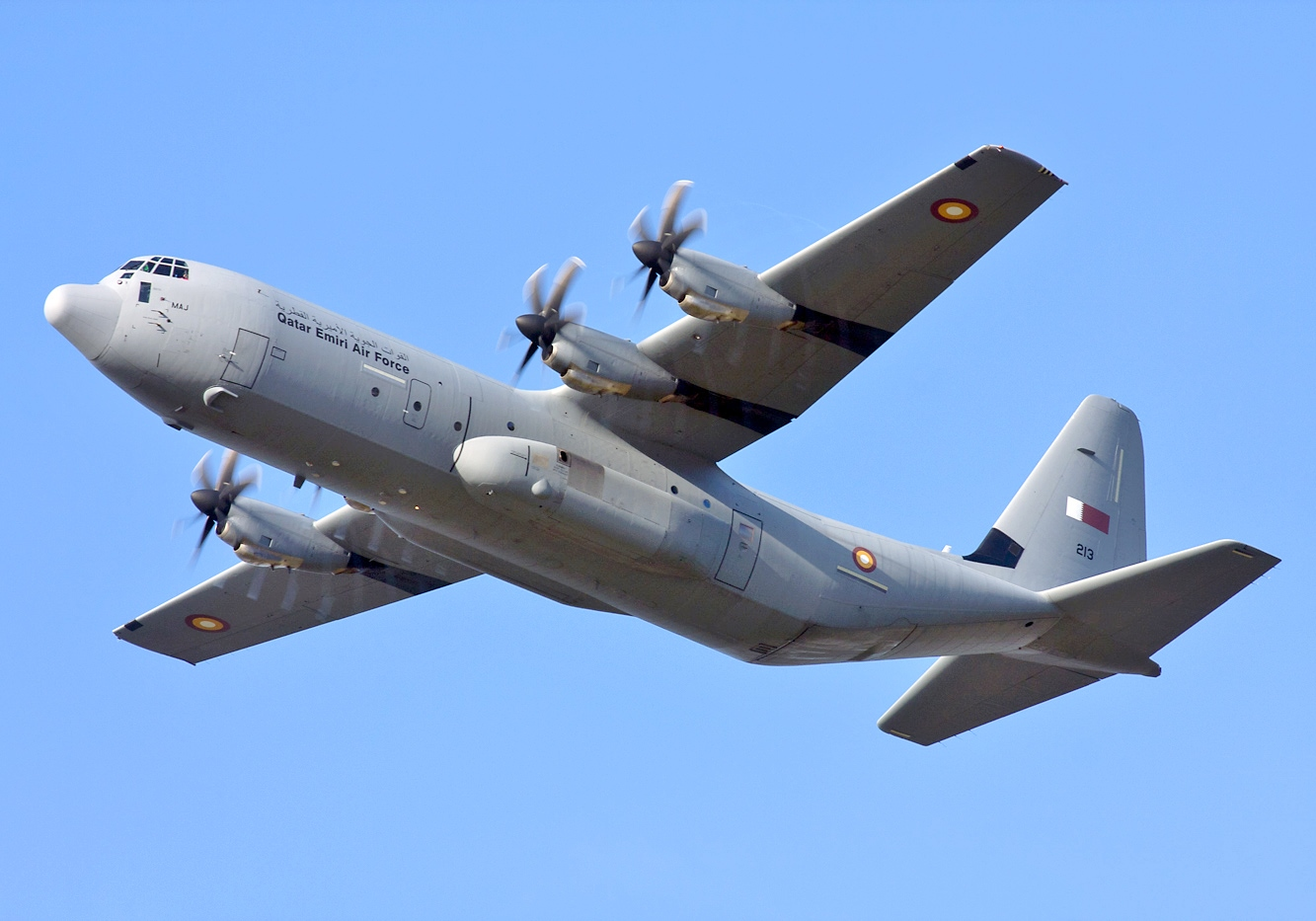
A C-130J flies overhead

Aircraft	Origin	Type	Variant	In service	Notes
Combat aircraft
Dassault Rafale	France	Swingrole fighter, single-seater	EQ (F3-R)	30	
Dassault Rafale	France	Conversion trainer	DQ (F3-R)	6	
Eurofighter Typhoon	Germany / United Kingdom / Italy / Spain	Swingrole fighter, single-seater	Tranche 3A	20	12 being sold to Turkey
Eurofighter Typhoon	Germany / United Kingdom / Italy / Spain	Conversion trainer	Tranche 3A	4	
F-15 Advanced Eagle	United States	Strike fighter	F-15QA	48	
Military transport aircraft
C-17 Globemaster III	United States	Strategic airlifter	–	8	1 used by the Qatar Amiri Flight
C-130J Super Hercules	United States	Tactical airlifter	–	4	
Pilatus PC-24	Switzerland	VIP transport	–	1	
Helicopters
AH-64 Apache	United States	Attack	AH-64E	24	
Aérospatiale Gazelle	France	Scout (armed)	SA342	13	
NHIndustries NH90	France; Germany Netherlands	Utility / transport	TTH	15	
NHIndustries NH90	France; Germany Netherlands	Maritime surveillance, transport and SAR	NFH	12	
AgustaWestland AW139	Italy	Utility / transport	–	19	
AgustaWestland AW109	Italy	Utility / transport	–	2	
Trainer aircraft
PAC Super Mushshak	Pakistan	Ab initio	MFI-395	8	
Pilatus PC-21	Switzerland	Basic and advanced trainer	–	24	
Pilatus PC-24	Switzerland	Multi-engine trainer	–	1	
M-346 Master	Italy	Lead-in fighter trainer	T346A	6	Operated at the International Flight Training School.
BAE Hawk	United Kingdom	Lead-in fighter trainer	Hawk 167	9	Operated in the UK.
AgustaWestland AW169	Italy	Rotorcraft trainer	–	4	
Unmanned aerial vehicle
Baykar Bayraktar TB2	Turkey	ISR, combat	–	6	With 3 ground stations.

==== Reserve fleet ====
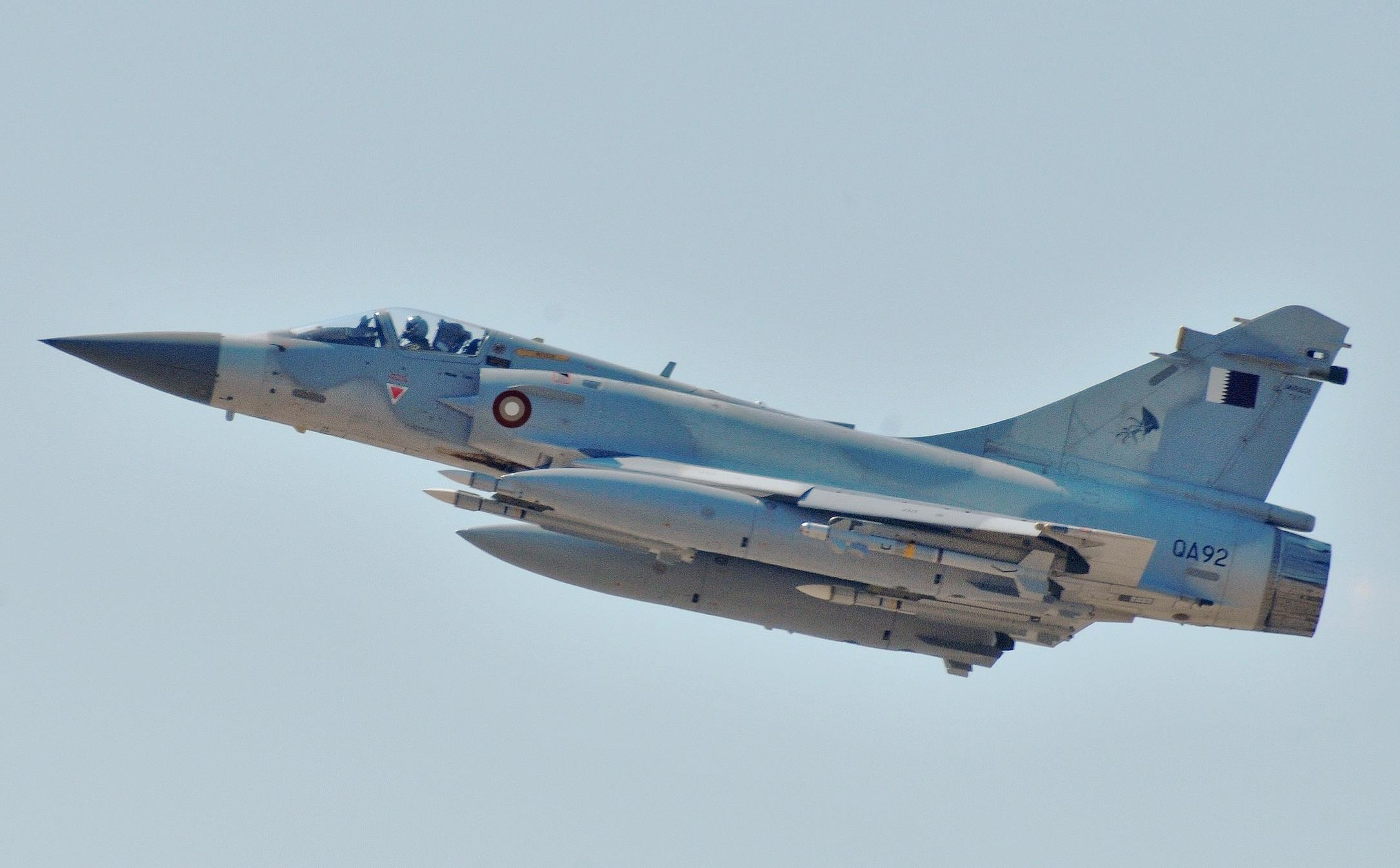
Mirage 2000

Aircraft	Origin	Type	Variant	In service	Notes
Combat aircraft
Dassault Mirage 2000	France	Multirole fighter	2000-5EDA	9	9 ordered in 1994.
Alphajet	France / Germany	Light attack aircraft	Alphajet E	6	
Trainer aircraft
Dassault Mirage 2000	France	Conversion trainer	2000-5DDA	3	3 ordered in 1994.

=== Air surveillance ===
- GM200 MM/A radars and GM400α radars ordered in January 2026.

=== Retired equipment ===
==== Aircraft ====
Previous notable aircraft operated consisted of the Mirage 2000, Westland Commando, Hawker Hunter, Dassault Mirage F1, Piper PA-34 Seneca, Boeing 707, Boeing 727, Westland Whirlwind, Britten-Norman Islander, and the Aérospatiale SA 330 Puma helicopter.

== Ranks ==
Officers

Rank group	General / flag officers				Senior officers			Junior officers
Qatar Emiri Air Force
Qatar Emiri Air Force	فريق أول; Fariq 'awal	فريق; Fariq	لواء; Liwa	عميد; Amid	عقيد; Aqid	مقدم; Muqaddam	رائد; Ra'id	نقيب; Naqib	ملازم أول; Mulazim awwal	ملازم; Mulazim

Enlisted and NCOs

Rank group	Senior NCOs				Junior NCOs		Enlisted
Qatar Emiri Air Force							No insignia
Qatar Emiri Air Force	وكيل اول; Wakil awwal	وكيل ثاني; Wakil thani	رقيب; Raqib	نائب; Nayib	عريف; Earif	وكيل عريف; Wakil earif	جندي; Jundi

== See also ==
- Al Udeid Air Base
- As Sayliyah Army Base
- Military ranks of Qatar
- Qatar Armed Forces
