= Winfield Scott (ship) =

Ships named Winfield Scott have been:

- SS Winfield Scott, a sidewheel steamer that transported passengers and cargo between San Francisco, California, and Panama in the early 1850s.
- MG Winfield Scott (LT-805), a U.S. Army tugboat.
- SS Winfield Scott (1941), a Liberty ship.
