= 260th Quartermaster Battalion (United States) =

- Active: 1942–45; 1967–2012
- Country: United States
- Branch: U.S. Army
- Garrison/HQ: Hunter Army Airfield
- Motto: "The Nectar For Victory"
- Engagements: World War II; Operation Desert Storm; Operation Iraqi Freedom
- Decorations: Meritorious Unit Commendation; Superior Unit Award

The 260th Quartermaster Battalion deploys and provides storage, distribution, and quality surveillance of bulk petroleum products in a corps area. The units official motto is 'THE NECTAR FOR VICTORY.'

== World War II ==
The 260th Quartermaster Service Battalion was constituted 19 December 1942. It was activated 29 January 1943 at Camp Swift, Texas. On 25 September 1943, the Battalion arrived at Bourock, Scotland and on to Proteus Camp to assist the populace and the war effort. On 17 July 1944, the 260th departed Southampton, England for Utah Beach, France. Until 15 February 1945, the Battalion supported front line troops with various types of logistical services. At one point, the battalion had a total of seven Quartermaster companies spread through England, France, Belgium, and Luxembourg. The 260th was inactivated 23 November 1945 at Camp Myles Standish, Massachusetts as part of the post war draw down.

The 260th Quartermaster Battalion received credit for the following WWII campaigns: Normandy, Northern France, Rhineland and the Ardennes Alsace.

== Vietnam Era and beyond ==
260th Quartermaster Service Battalion, was redesignated as the HHC, 260th Quartermaster Battalion (Petroleum Supply) on 13 October 1966 and reactivated on 4 January 1967 at Fort Lee, Virginia and assigned training, post support and maintenance missions. The distinctive unit insignia was originally approved on 6 July 1967. On 21 October 1972, HHC, 260th was transferred to Fort Stewart. The relocation was short lived as the 260th relocated to its current residence, Hunter Army Airfield, on 1 July 1974. The unit did not see service in the Vietnam War. The unit did see service in Urgent Fury (Grenada)

== Desert Shield/Storm ==
On 9 October 1990, the 260th Quartermaster Battalion deployed in support of Operations Desert Shield and Storm. The Battalion organized into a 1,200-Soldier multifunctional Forward Corps Support Battalion co-locating with the 24th Infantry Division Support Command. The 260th CSB operated as the largest CSB under the 171st Corps Support Group throughout the operation and the largest Battalion in the 1st Corps Support Command. The 260th suffered one casualty during the operation on 14 April 1991 PFC Cindy D.J. Bridges, 20, from Trinity, Alabama.

== 1992–2001 ==
The distinctive unit insignia was amended on 26 February 1993 to include metric measurements in the description and revise the symbolism. The Distinctive Unit Insignia consists of two gold keys saltirewise with wards up, behind a black wheel with six wavy spokes, above the motto and wheel a blue semicircle, in base an area of red, all above a gold scroll inscribed "THE NECTAR FOR VICTORY" in black. The battalion provided life support to the athletes competing in the 1996 Olympic Games in Atlanta. The units shoulder sleeve insignia was approved on 22 June 1998. The battalion saw the successful deployments to Exercise Roving Sands 1997 and 1999, along with the 559th Quarter Master Battalion participation in Exercise Bright Star 1998 and 2000, and the unit's selection as the 1999 Department of the Army Phillip A Connelly Award for Food Service Excellence and the Forces Command winner of the 2002 Phillip A Connelly Award for Food Service Excellence. In May 2001, the 416th Transportation Company (Petroleum, Oils, and Lubricants), an element of the 260th Quartermaster Battalion (Petroleum Support), from Hunter Army Airfield, Georgia participated in the first The Americas Contingency Energy Solutions Program test. This would prove to be invaluable experience in the years to come.

== Global War on Terror ==
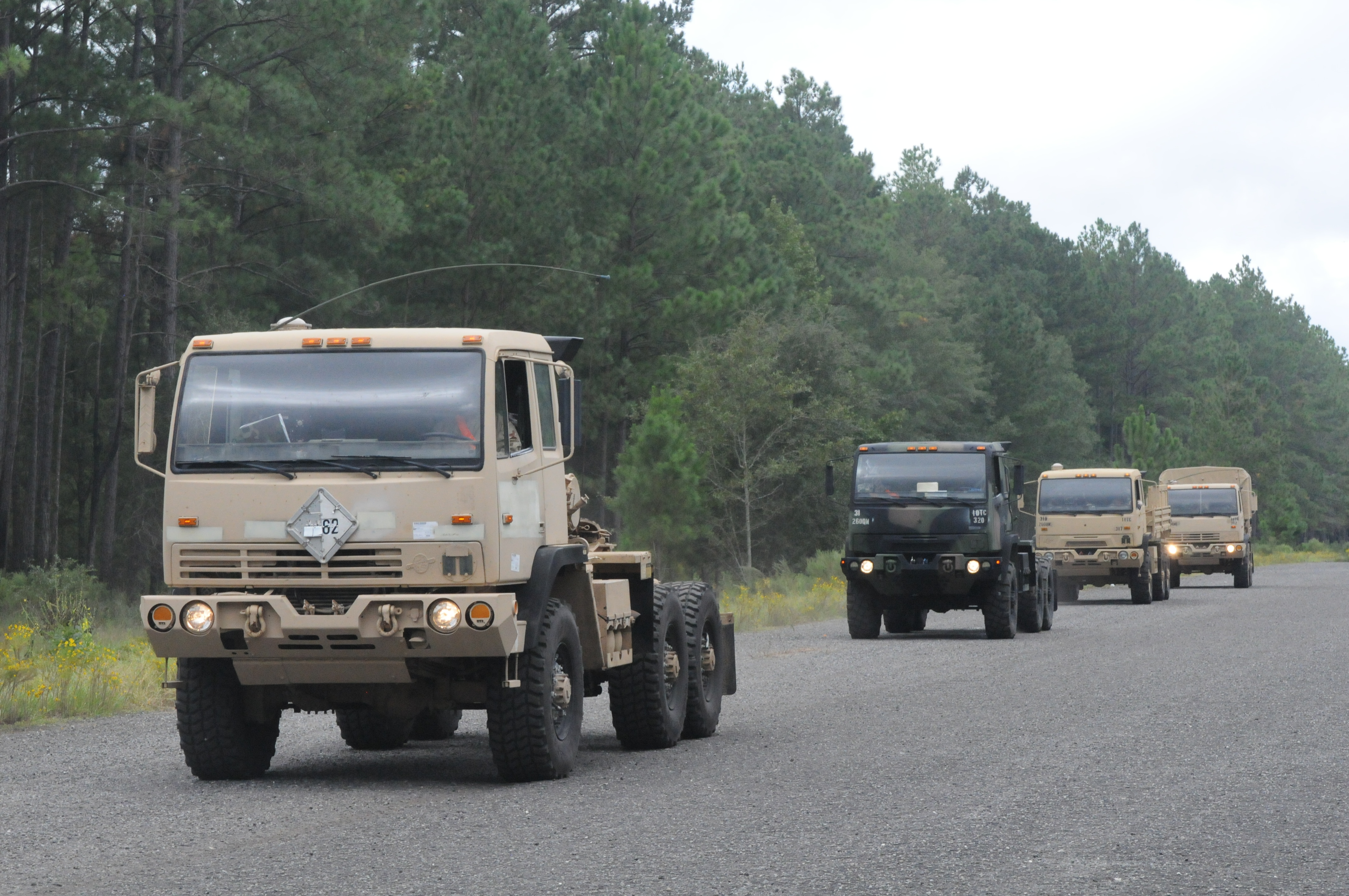
M1088 tractor units of 260th QM Bn. conduct driver training near Ft. Stewart, 2009

In March 2003, the 260th Quartermaster Battalion's headquarters (HHD, Headquarters and Headquarters Detachment) deployed to Kuwait as part of Operation Enduring Freedom under 49th Group (Fort Lee, VA), providing fuel transportation support and serving as the "mayor" cell of its respective base camp. After staging at the Iraq/Kuwaiti border, the unit's headquarters were positioned at Camp Cedar I immediately following the invasion and then later moved to Camp Cedar II near Talil Air Base in Iraq. In the fall of 2003, the 260th QM BN redeployed after having supported the invasion of Iraq and coalition forces by transporting nearly 80 million US gallons (300,000 m^{3}) of fuel and driving more than 9 million miles, having had over 10 subordinate national guard and army reserve transportation companies underneath its umbrella of command.

In August 2006, the HHD of the 260th QM BN (PS) deployed for its second tour to the Iraqi theater of operations.

The 260th Quartermaster Battalion (PS) currently consists of the Headquarters and Headquarters Detachment, the 110th Quartermaster Company, the 416th Transportation Company, the 473rd Quartermaster Company, the 512th Quartermaster Company, the 172nd Medical Detachment, and the 258th Movement Control Team. (The 10th Transportation Company and 202nd Quartermaster Detachment were recently inactivated. The 514th Engineer Detachment (Firefighter) was reassigned to the 92nd Engineer Battalion at Fort Stewart, GA.)

In June 2012 the 260th Quartermaster Battalion was deactivated in a ceremony at Hunter Army Airfield.

== Unit Decorations ==
- Meritorious Unit Commendation
- Army Superior Unit Award
- Olympic Streamer embroidered 1996
- Army Streamer embroidered SOUTHWEST ASIA
