= David J. Scott =

United States Air Force major general

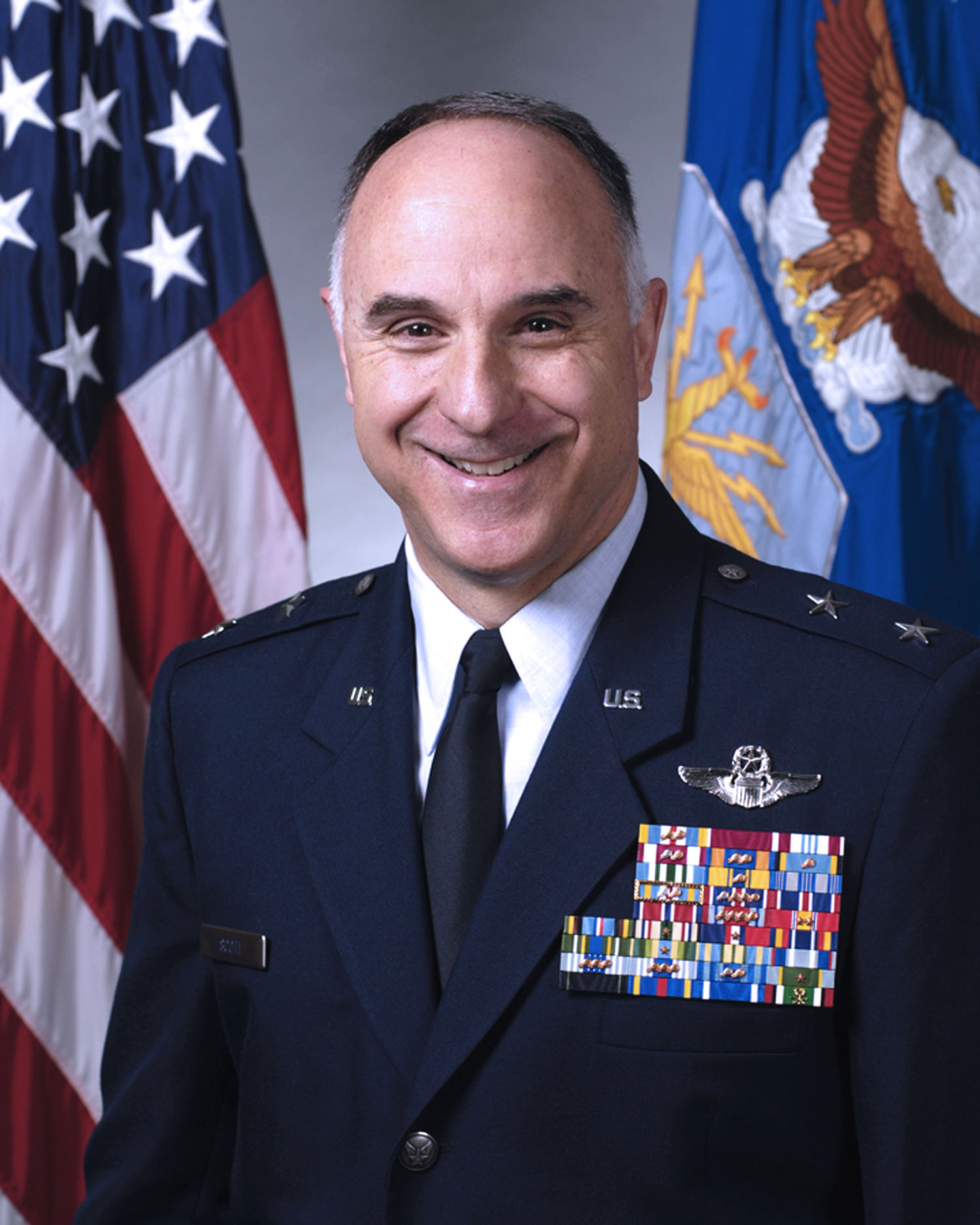
- Official portrait of Maj Gen Scott, 2009
- Born: David John Scott c. 1956
- Education: U.S. Air Force Academy (BS); Valdosta State College (MBA)
- Father: Winfield W. Scott Jr.
- Relatives: Winfield W. Scott III (brother)
- Military career
- Allegiance: United States
- Branch: United States Air Force
- Service years: 1978–2012
- Rank: Major general
- Nickname: Limo
- Conflicts: Gulf War; Kosovo War; NATO bombing of Yugoslavia; War on terror
- Awards: Distinguished Service Medal; Defense Sup. Service Medal (3); Legion of Merit (2)

David John Scott (born c. 1956) is a retired American military officer. A son of the tenth Superintendent of the United States Air Force Academy (USAFA), Lieutenant General Winfield W. Scott Jr., he graduated from USAFA in 1978 and served in the United States Air Force until 2012, rising to the rank of Major General.
