= Winfield W. Scott III =

United States Air Force general

Major General Winfield W. Scott III
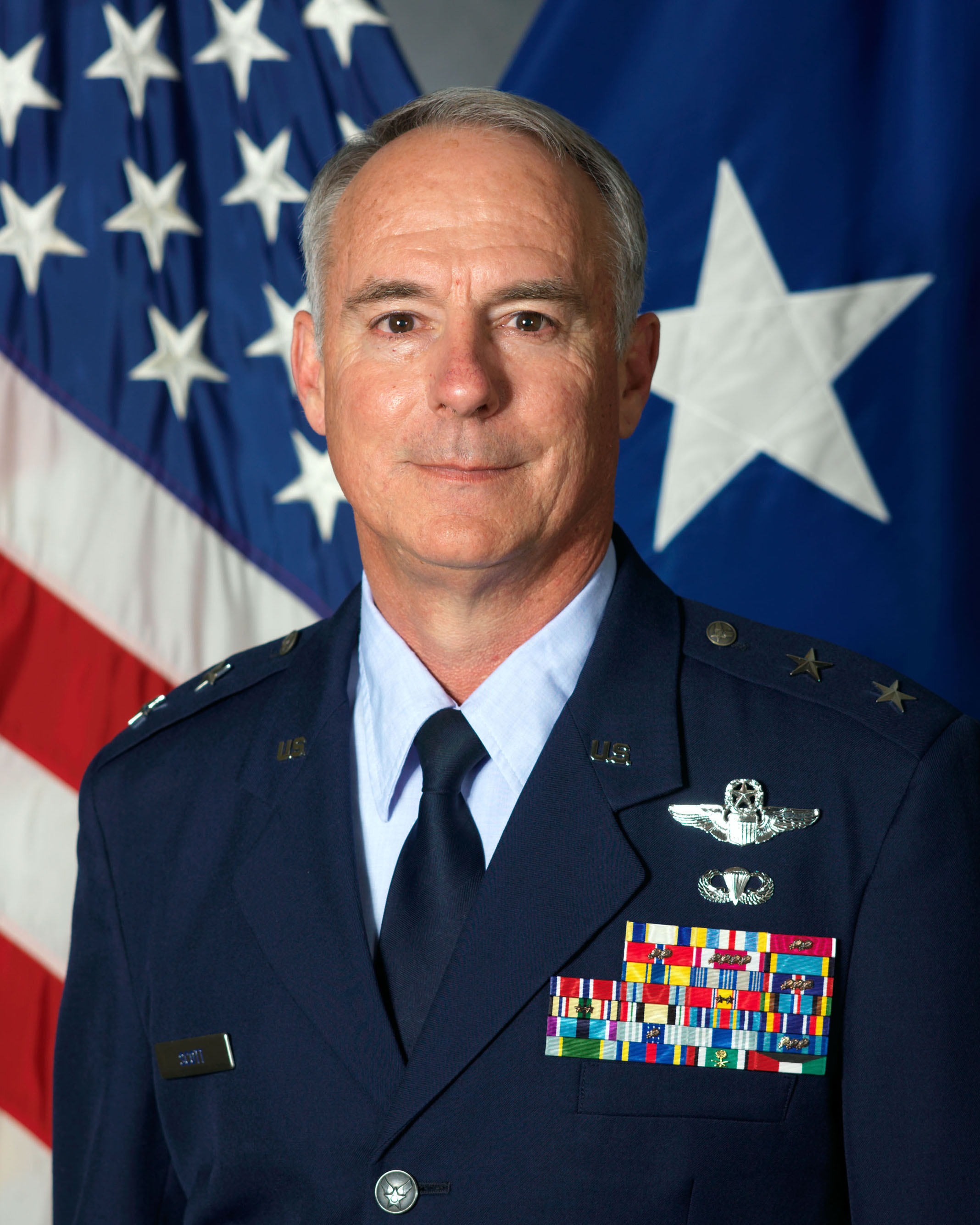
- Major General Winfield W. Scott III, USAF
- Born: May 27, 1952 (age 74); Ohio, U.S.
- Father: Winfield W. Scott Jr.
- Relatives: David J. Scott (brother)
- Military career
- Allegiance: United States of America
- Branch: United States Air Force
- Service years: 1974–2009
- Rank: Major General
- Unit: Joint Special Operations Command
- Commands: Tanker Airlift Control Center; 43rd Airlift Wing; 64th Air Expeditionary Wing
- Conflicts: Operation Desert Storm; Operation Iraqi Freedom
- Awards: Defense Superior Service Medal; Legion of Merit (3); Bronze Star (2); Meritorious Service Medal (5); Aerial Achievement Medal; Air Force Commendation Medal; Air Force Achievement Medal

Major General Winfield Wayne Scott III (born May 27, 1952) was Commander, Tanker Airlift Control Center, Scott Air Force Base, Illinois. The TACC is responsible for planning, scheduling and directing a fleet of more than 1,200 aircraft in support of combat delivery and strategic airlift, air refueling and aeromedical operations around the world.

The general graduated from the United States Military Academy in 1974 with a Bachelor of Science degree in military science, and earned a master of arts degree in 1983. He has commanded the 374th Operations Group at Yokota Air Base, Japan, the 47th Flying Training Wing at Laughlin AFB, Texas, and the 43rd Airlift Wing, Pope Air Force Base, North Carolina. The general also commanded the 64th Air Expeditionary Wing in support of Operation Iraqi Freedom. In addition, he served as the Inspector General for U.S. Transportation Command and Headquarters Air Mobility Command, which are located at Scott AFB, Illinois. Prior to his final assignment, he was Deputy Director of Programs, Office of the Deputy Chief of Staff for Plans and Programs.

Born in Ohio, he is the son of Lieutenant General Winfield W. Scott Jr.

== Education ==
- 1974 Bachelor of Science degree in military science, U.S. Military Academy, West Point, New York
- 1983 Master of Arts degree in management, Webster University, Webster Groves, Missouri
- 1989 Air Command and Staff College, Maxwell AFB, Alabama
- 1995 National War College, Fort Lesley J. McNair, Washington, D.C.

== Flight information ==
- Rating: Command pilot
- Flight hours: More than 5,600
- Aircraft flown: C-141 Starlifter, C-130 Hercules, T-1 and UH-1N

== Effective dates of promotion ==
- Second Lieutenant June 5, 1974
- First Lieutenant June 5, 1976
- Captain June 5, 1978
- Major November 1, 1985
- Lieutenant Colonel October 1, 1990
- Colonel August 1, 1996
- Brigadier General August 1, 2002
- Major General General September 1, 2005
