= Winfield W. Scott Jr. =

United States Air Force general

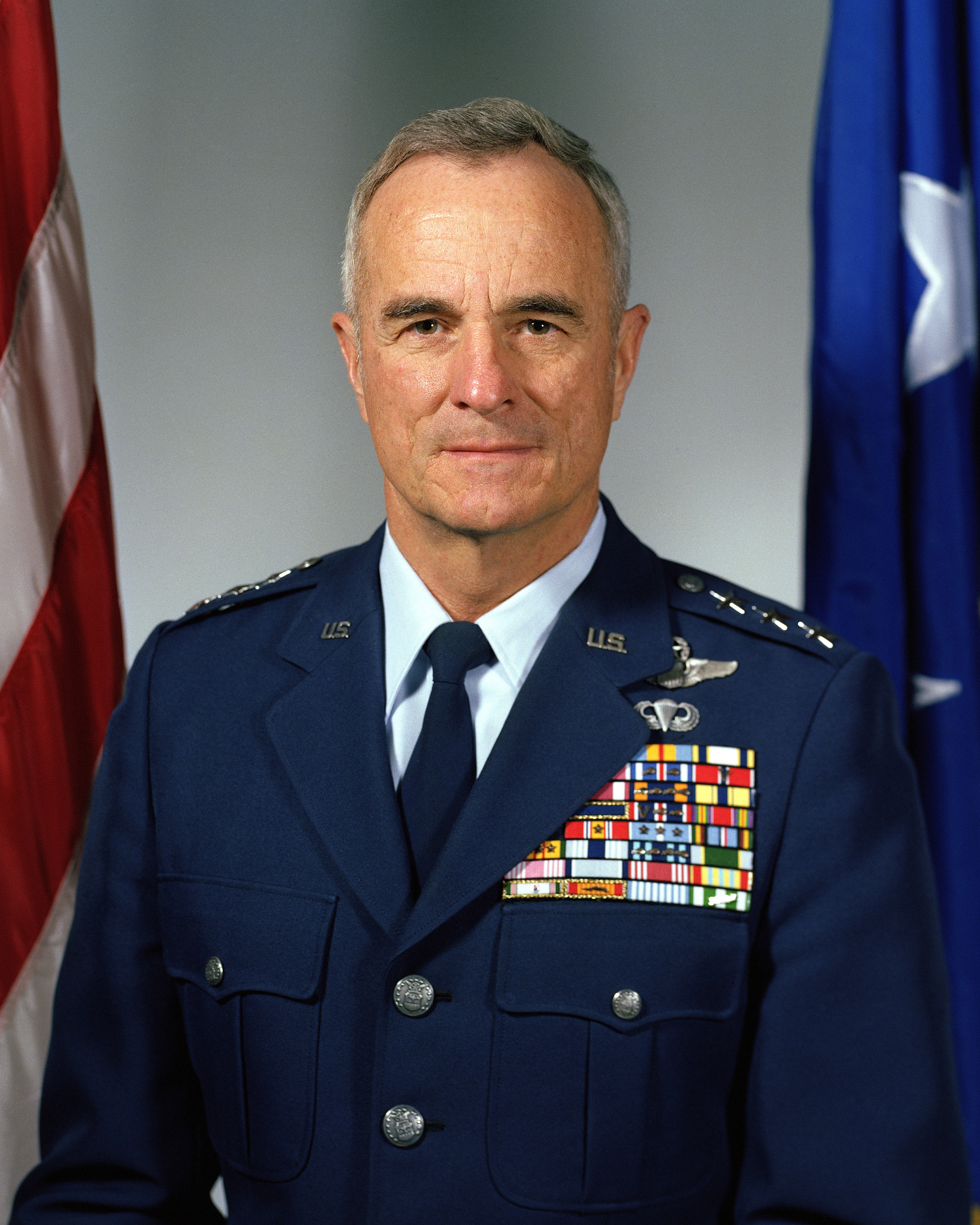
- Official portrait of Lt Gen Scott, 1985
- Born: Winfield Wayne Scott Jr. December 10, 1927; Honolulu, Hawaii, U.S.
- Died: March 19, 2022 (aged 94); Colorado Springs, Colorado, U.S.
- Burial place: U.S. Air Force Academy Cemetery
- Alma mater: U.S. Military Academy (BS); Catholic University (MA)
- Spouse: Sally (died 2015)
- Children: 6, including Winfield III and David
- Military career
- Allegiance: United States
- Branch: United States Air Force
- Service years: 1950–1987
- Rank: Lieutenant General
- Nickname: "Skip"
- Commands: U.S. Air Force Academy Superintendent
- Conflicts: Korean War; Vietnam War
- Awards: Distinguished Flying Cross; Bronze Star Medal

Winfield Wayne Scott Jr. (December 10, 1927 – March 19, 2022) was the tenth Superintendent of the United States Air Force Academy in Colorado. Thereafter, he was appointed Superintendent of the New Mexico Military Institute, a public military high school and junior college that is supported by the State of New Mexico, located in Roswell, New Mexico.

== Biography ==
Scott was born in 1927, in Honolulu. He graduated from Greenbrier Military School in Lewisburg, West Virginia, in 1945 and entered the United States Military Academy at West Point, New York in 1946. Upon graduation from the academy in 1950, he received a bachelor of science degree in military science and a commission as a second lieutenant. General Scott earned a master of arts degree in international law and relations from The Catholic University of America, Washington, D.C., in 1963. He completed the Armed Forces Staff College in Norfolk, Virginia, in 1964 and the Naval War College in Newport, Rhode Island, in 1967.

He received his wings upon completion of pilot training in August 1951 at Craig Air Force Base, Alabama. After advanced fighter pilot training at Luke Air Force Base, Arizona, he was assigned as a tactical reconnaissance pilot at Kimpo Air Base, South Korea, where he completed a combat tour of duty in F-51 Mustangs.

From 1952 to 1959, General Scott served in many operational and maintenance positions flying F-80s, F-86s and F-100s. In 1958 he won individual honors as high man in the Pacific Air Forces Fighter Weapons Meet flying the F-100 Super Sabre.

Scott was assigned as an Air Force Reserve Officer Training Corps instructor from May 1959 to July 1962, and then as professor of aerospace studies at the Catholic University of America until August 1963. He completed the Armed Forces Staff College in February 1964 and then transferred to Royal Air Force Station Lakenheath, England, as commander of the 492d Tactical Fighter Squadron. He entered the Naval War College in August 1966 and after graduation completed transition training with the 476th Tactical Fighter Squadron at George Air Force Base, California, where he was top gun in the F-4D Phantom.

He was assigned to the Republic of Vietnam in January 1968 as assistant director of operations, 366th Tactical Fighter Wing, Da Nang Air Base, where he flew 108 combat missions in F-4s. In August 1968 he became chief of the Current Operations Division, Tactical Air Control Center, Headquarters Seventh Air Force, Tan Son Nhut Air Base.

From 1969 to 1977, Scott held various command and staff positions: action officer on the Air Staff, wing commander, division commander, vice commander of an air logistics center, and commander of a technical training center.

Scott served as assistant deputy chief of staff, plans and operations, Headquarters U.S. Air Force, Washington, D.C., from August 1977 until June 1978. He then took command of the Alaskan Air Command, with additional duty as commander of the Alaskan North American Air Defense Region, Elmendorf Air Force Base, Alaska. In April 1981 he was assigned to Seoul, South Korea, as deputy commander, United States Forces Korea; deputy commander in chief, United Nations Command Korea; chief of staff, Combined Forces Command; and commander of the Air Component Command. He became Air Force Academy Superintendent in June 1983.

The general was a command pilot with more than 5,300 flying hours in more than 25 different aircraft including F-4s, F-15s and F-16s, and was jump qualified.

His military decorations and awards include the Defense Distinguished Service Medal, Legion of Merit, Distinguished Flying Cross with two oak leaf clusters, Bronze Star with "V" device, Meritorious Service Medal, Air Medal with eight oak leaf clusters, Air Force Commendation Medal and the Republic of Korea Order of National Security Merit (Kukson and Cheon Su medals). In May 1980 he was inducted into the Air Force Order of the Sword by the noncommissioned officers of the Alaskan Air Command and in July 1980 the Air Force Sergeants Association awarded General Scott the L. Mendel Rivers Award for Excellence.

In 1985, while Superintendent of the U.S. Air Force Academy, Scott accomplished the Academy's freefall parachute training. At nearly 60 years old, he was the oldest and highest-ranking person to earn jump wings through that program, said to be the only training program in the world where the student's very first jump is accomplished as solo freefall (as opposed to solo static line or tandem freefall).

A point of irony is that Willard W. Scott was a cadet at West Point at the same time as Winfield W. Scott, with Willard being two years senior to Winfield. While they share W. W. Scott as their abbreviated name, the two are not related. But both attained the rank of lieutenant general and both became service academy superintendents, with Willard being the superintendent of West Point through several of the same years that Winfield was superintendent at Air Force.

Winfield W. Scott was promoted to lieutenant general August 22, 1978, with date of rank August 21, 1978. He retired August 1, 1987, and died on March 19, 2022.

== Notes ==
Preceded by Robert E. Kelley	Superintendent of the U.S. Air Force Academy; 1983—1987	Succeeded by Charles R. Hamm
