= Culture of Northern Ireland =

The culture of Northern Ireland encompasses elements of the culture of Ulster, the culture of Ireland as a whole, the culture of Scotland and the culture of England are to be found.

== Heritage ==
Since 1998, the Ulster Museum, Armagh Museum, Ulster Folk and Transport Museum and the Ulster American Folk Park have been administered by the National Museums and Galleries of Northern Ireland.

The Linen Hall Library, the oldest library in Belfast, has endured many changes of fortune since its foundation in 1788, but has maintained a vision of providing access to literature and local studies to the population at large.

- Abbeys and priories in Northern Ireland
- Gardens in Northern Ireland
- Giant's Causeway
- List of country houses in the United Kingdom
- Museums in Northern Ireland
- National parks of Northern Ireland

== Cuisine ==
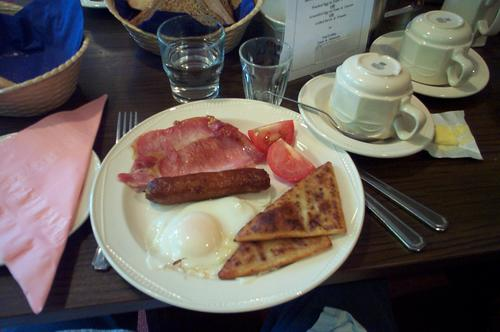
An Ulster fry, served in Belfast.

Northern Ireland's best known chefs include Paul Rankin and Michael Deane.

The best known traditional dish in Northern Ireland is the Ulster fry. Two other popular meals are fish and chips or 'Bangers and Mash' (Sausages and Creamed Potatoes)

A unique speciality to Northern Ireland is Yellowman. Yellowman is a chewy toffee-textured honeycomb and is sold in non-standard blocks and chips and is associated with the Ould Lammas Fair in Ballycastle, County Antrim, where it is sold along with other confectionery and often dulse.

Dulse is commonly used in Ireland, where it can be used to make white soda bread. It can be found in many health food stores or fish markets and can be ordered directly from local distributors. it is also traditionally sold at the Ould Lammas Fair. It is particularly popular along the Causeway Coast. Although a fast-dying tradition, many gather their own dulse. Along the Ulster coastline from County Down to County Donegal in the Republic of Ireland, it is eaten dried and uncooked as a snack.

== Language ==
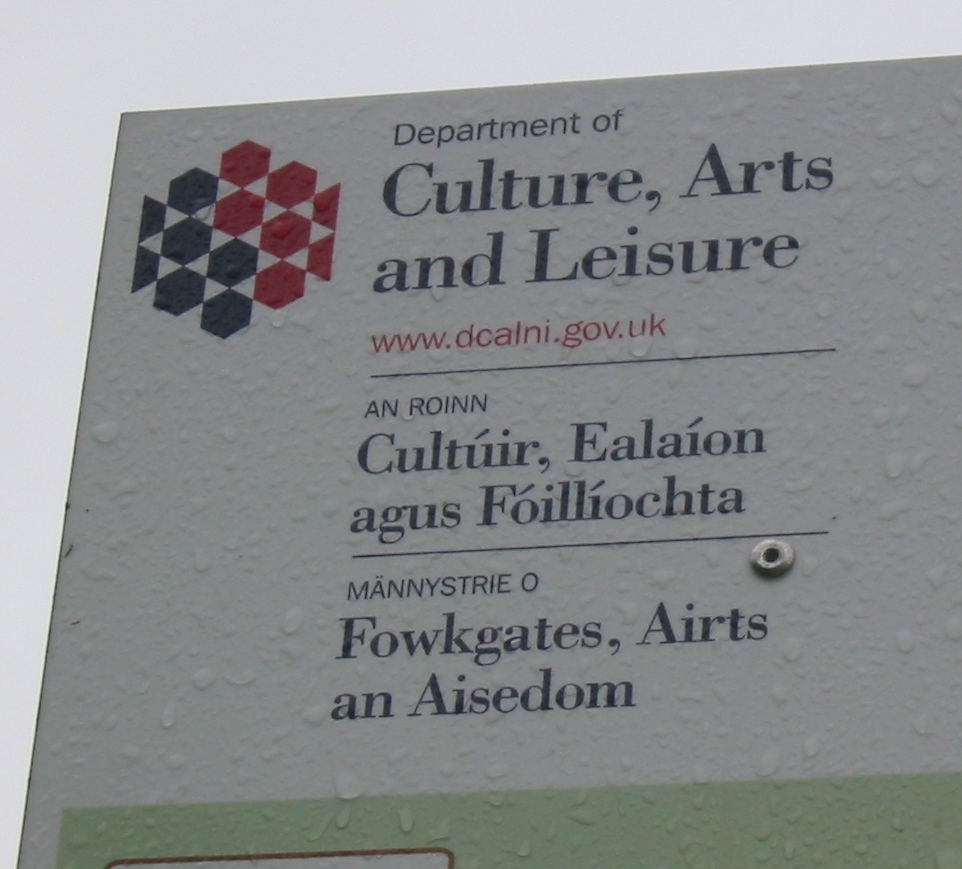
The brand identity of the Department of Culture, Arts and Leisure in Northern Ireland as shown on this sign is displayed in English, Irish and Ulster Scots

English is the most spoken language in Northern Ireland. There are also two recognised regional languages in Northern Ireland: the Irish language (see Irish language in Northern Ireland) and the local variety of Scots known as Ulster Scots. Northern Ireland Sign Language and Irish Sign Language have been recognised since 29 March 2004. A third, British Sign Language is also used.

At the 2001 census, Chinese was the most widely spoken minority language in Northern Ireland, with Shelta, Arabic and Portuguese also spoken by a significant number of people. Since the census, however, an influx of people from recent EU accession states is likely to have significantly increased numbers of speakers of languages from these countries. Detailed figures on these changes are not yet available.

== Sports ==
Some team sports are played on an All-Ireland basis, while in others Northern Ireland fields its own team.

- Belfast Giants
- Gaelic football
- Hurling
- Gaelic handball
- Milk Cup, an international youth association football competition held in Northern Ireland
- Northern Ireland national football team
- Royal Portrush Golf Club
- Ulster GAA
- Ulster Rugby
- Rowing

Internationally well-known sports people include:

- George Best – footballer, born in Belfast
- Sir Danny Blanchflower – footballer
- Darren Clarke – golfer, born in Dungannon
- Joey Dunlop
- Jack Kyle
- Dave Finlay
- Paddy Hopkirk
- John Watson (racing driver)
- Mike Gibson (rugby union)
- Mike Bull
- Peter Chambers
- Alex Higgins
- David Humphreys
- Eddie Irvine
- Dave McAuley
- Willie John McBride
- Tony McCoy
- Wayne McCullough
- Dame Mary Peters
- Ronan Rafferty
- Dennis Taylor
- Andrew Trimble
- Norman Whiteside
- Terry Moore (soccer)
- Cormac McAnallen
- Rory McIlroy
- Daryl Gurney

== Arts ==
=== Literature ===
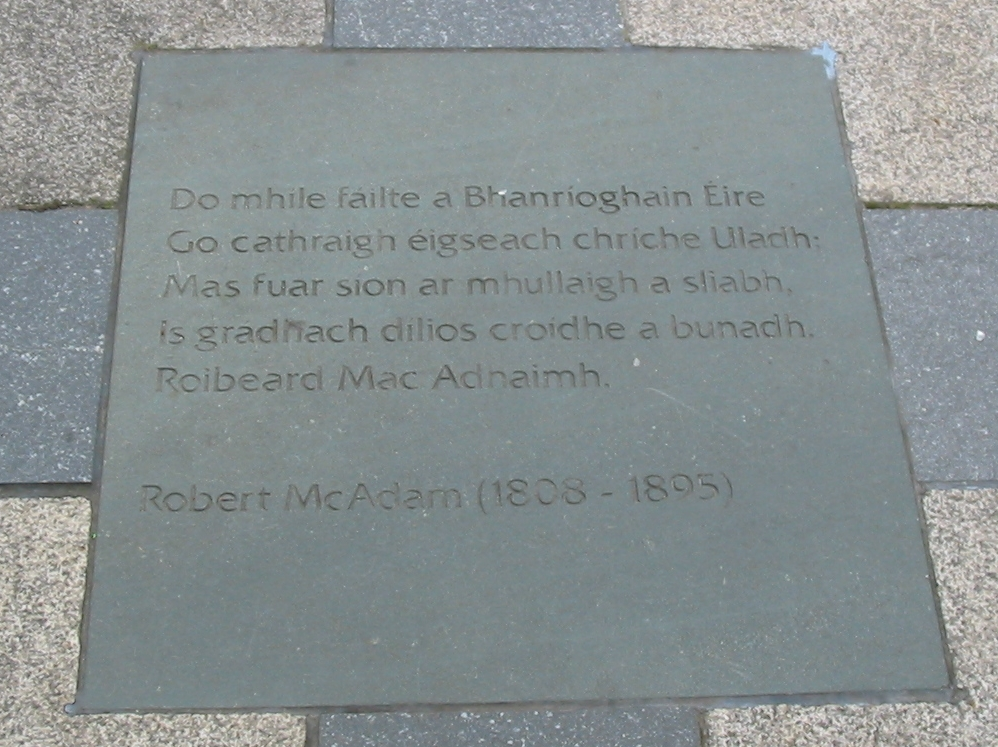
Poetry by Robert McAdam (1808–1895) in paving, Writers' Square, Belfast

Despite its small geographical size, Northern Ireland prolifically produces internationally renowned writers and poets from a wide variety of disciplines. Irish language literature was the predominant literature in the pre-Plantation period. The Ulster Cycle is pertinent to the history of literature in the territory of present-day Northern Ireland. Ulster Scots literature first followed models from Scotland, with the rhyming weavers, such as James Orr, developing an indigenous tradition of vernacular literature. Writers in the counties which now form Northern Ireland participated in the Gaelic Revival.

- Ciarán Carson
- Brian Friel
- Seamus Heaney
- John Hewitt
- C. S. Lewis
- Bernard MacLaverty
- Louis MacNeice
- Ian McDonald
- Medbh McGuckian
- Paul Muldoon
- Flann O'Brien
- Frank Ormsby
- Tom Paulin
- Richard Rowley
- Bob Shaw
- Irish Pages - literary journal, edited in Belfast

=== Visual arts ===
Noted visual artists from Northern Ireland include:

- Bogside Artists
- Basil Blackshaw, born in Glengormley, Painter
- Max Clendinning, post-modernist architect and interior designer
- Willie Doherty, Photographer & video artist twice nominated for the Turner Prize
- Garth Ennis, born in Holywood Co. Down, is creator of popular Vertigo series Preacher
- Terry George, born in Co. Down, director of Hotel Rwanda
- John Kindness, Painter and Sculptor
- Sir John Lavery, born in Belfast, was a representative of the group known as the Irish Impressionists.
- Neil Shawcross, painter
- Paul Seawright, Photographer & Professor at the University of Ulster
- Victor Sloan, MBE, Photographer
- Sir Hans Sloane, Born in Killyleagh, County Down, in 1660, his famous collection was opened to the public as the British Museum in 1759
- John Butler Yeats, Painter

=== Performing arts ===
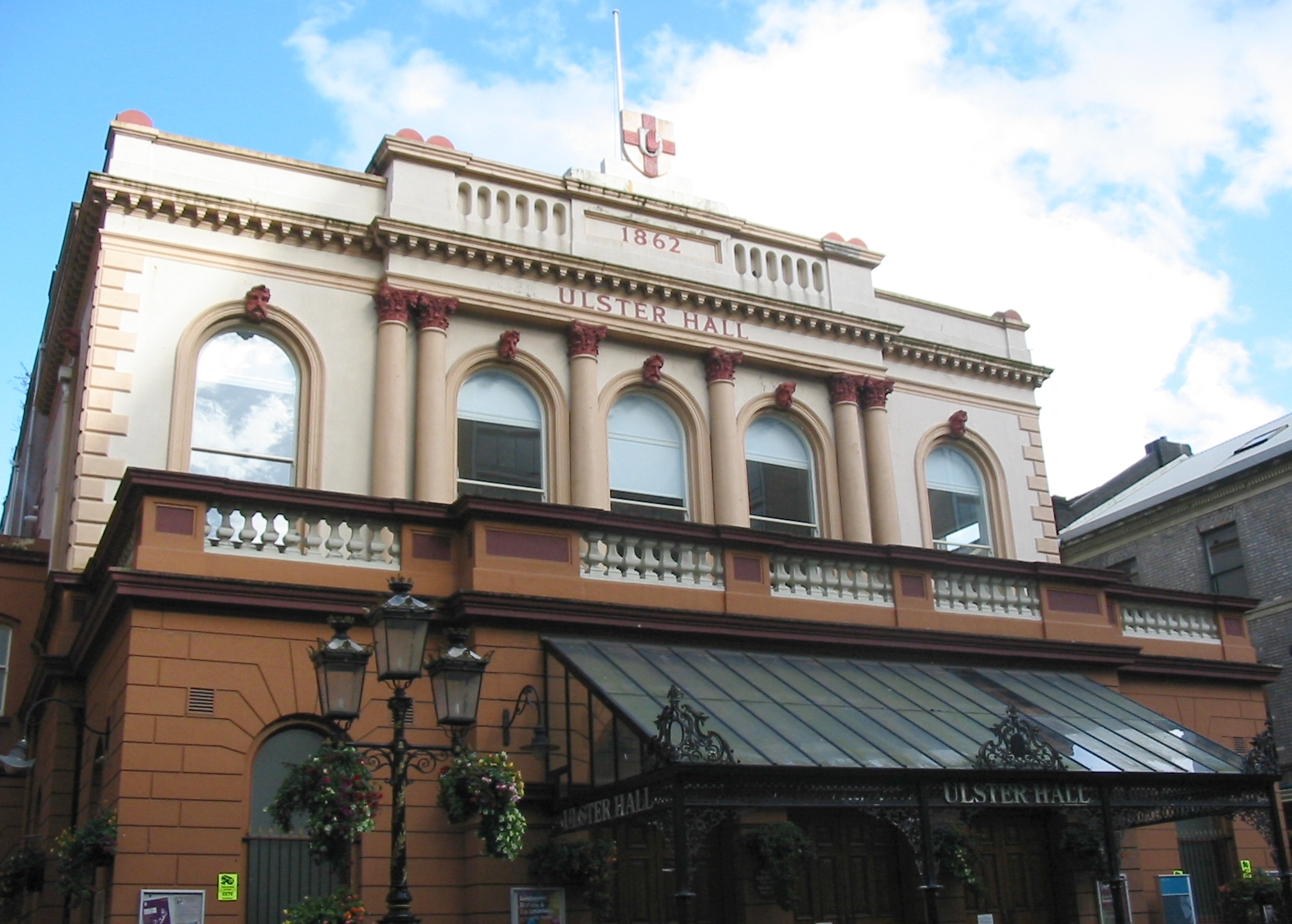
Ulster Hall, a venue for concerts and performance.

Noted actors from Northern Ireland include:

- Stephen Boyd
- Anthony Boyle
- Kenneth Branagh
- Brian Friel
- Ciarán Hinds
- Siobhán McKenna
- Colin Morgan
- Liam Neeson
- Sam Neill
- James Nesbitt
- Stephen Rea
- Ray Stevenson
- Richard Dormer
- Conleth Hill

=== Film and television ===
See also Cinema of Northern Ireland

Northern Ireland Screen, a government agency financed by Invest NI and the European Regional Development Fund, provides financial support to film and television productions in Northern Ireland. Among the works it has supported is the 2011 HBO television series Game of Thrones, which is filmed principally in Belfast's Paint Hall studios and on location elsewhere in Northern Ireland.

Belfast hosts the Belfast Film Festival and the CineMagic film festival, as well as several independent cinemas including Queen's Film Theatre and Strand Cinema.

=== Music ===
Noted musicians from Northern Ireland include:

- Ash
- Agnelli & Nelson
- Bearface
- Bicep (duo)
- Brian Kennedy
- Vivian Campbell
- Derek Bell
- D Ream
- Duke Special
- Candida Doyle
- The Freshmen
- Gary Moore
- George Cassidy (jazz musician)
- Sir James Galway
- General Fiasco
- Tony McAuley
- Kneecap
- Neil Hannon
- Nadine Coyle (of Girls Aloud)
- Phil Kieran
- Ruby Murray
- Snow Patrol
- Stiff Little Fingers
- Two Door Cinema Club
- The Undertones
- Therapy?
- Ulster Orchestra
- Hamilton Harty
- Michael Alcorn
- The Answer
- Van Morrison and Them
- David McWilliams
- Foy Vance
- VerseChorusVerse
- In Case of Fire

=== Crafts ===
August Craft Month is an annual coordinated programme of events that showcase the work of craft makers in Northern Ireland and from across the United Kingdom, Ireland and Europe. It is organised by Craft Northern Ireland.

== Songs ==
A traditional song of the Unionist and Loyalist communities is The Sash, which may be considered offensive or at least distasteful by the Nationalist communities, particularly when it is used to threaten or incite violence.

Irish rebel music is very prominent among the Nationalist community, peaking in popularity at the height of The Troubles.

== Symbolism and traditions ==
Unionists tend to use the Union Flag and sometimes the Ulster Banner, while nationalists usually use the Flag of Ireland, or sometimes the Flag of Ulster. Both sides also occasionally use the flags of secular and religious organisations they belong to. Some groups, including the Irish Rugby Football Union and the Church of Ireland use the Flag of St. Patrick as a symbol of Ireland which lacks the same nationalist or unionist connotations.

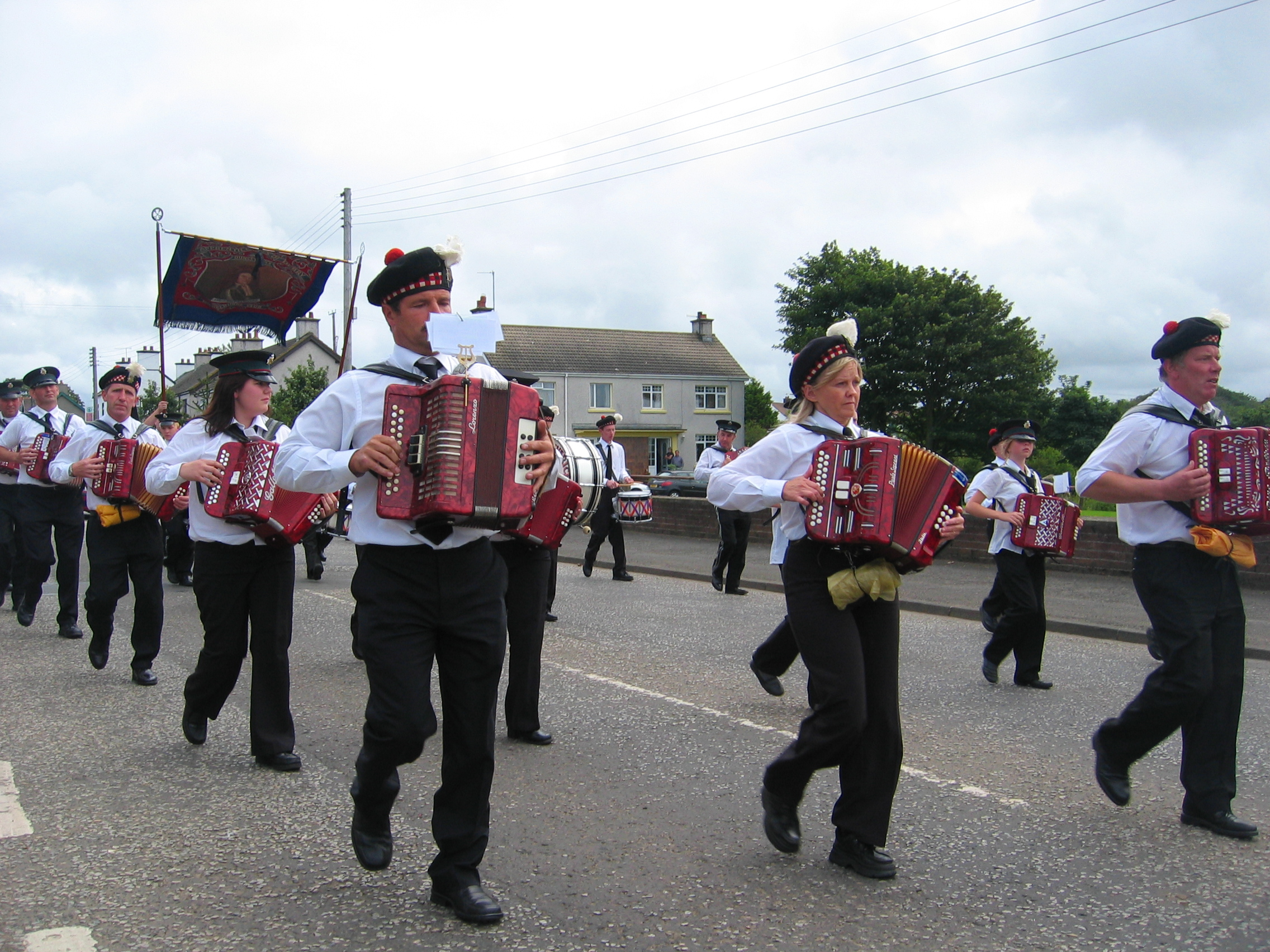
Apprentice Boys band marching in Bushmills.

The flax flower, representing the linen industry, has been used as a neutral symbol – as for the Northern Ireland Assembly.

St. Patrick's Day is celebrated by both nationalists and unionists, while "The Twelfth" is celebrated only by unionists.

Celebrations to mark the anniversary of the Battle of the Boyne are held every Twelfth of July and draw huge crowds. The Apprentice Boys of Derry also organise commemorative events. The bowler hat is a symbol of Orangeism.

The Belfast International Tattoo is an annual indoor event running since 2013. It showcases a variety of musical and military marching displays. It's modeled after the Royal Edinburgh Military Tattoo and features a wide range of performers, including pipe bands, accordion bands, highland dancers, and military marching bands locally and from around the world.

== See also ==
- Irish art
- Irish literature
- Irish music
- Culture of Ireland
- Culture of Belfast
- Ulster Scots
- Ulster Irish
- Audiences NI
- Halloween
- Lyric Theatre (Belfast)
- Belfast Festival at Queens
- Odyssey
- Waterfront Hall
- Tennents ViTal
- The Black North
