= Culture of Belfast =

The culture of Belfast, much like the city, is a microcosm of the culture of Northern Ireland. Hilary McGrady, chief executive of Imagine Belfast, claimed that "Belfast has begun a social, economic and cultural transformation that has the potential to reverberate across Europe." Belfast is split between two rarely-overlapping vibrant cultural communities, a high-culture of opera, professional theatre, filmmaking and the visual arts and a more popular or commercial culture. Throughout the short years of troubles, Belfast tried to express itself through art and music. In the second decade of the twenty-first century, the city has a growing international cultural reputation

== History ==
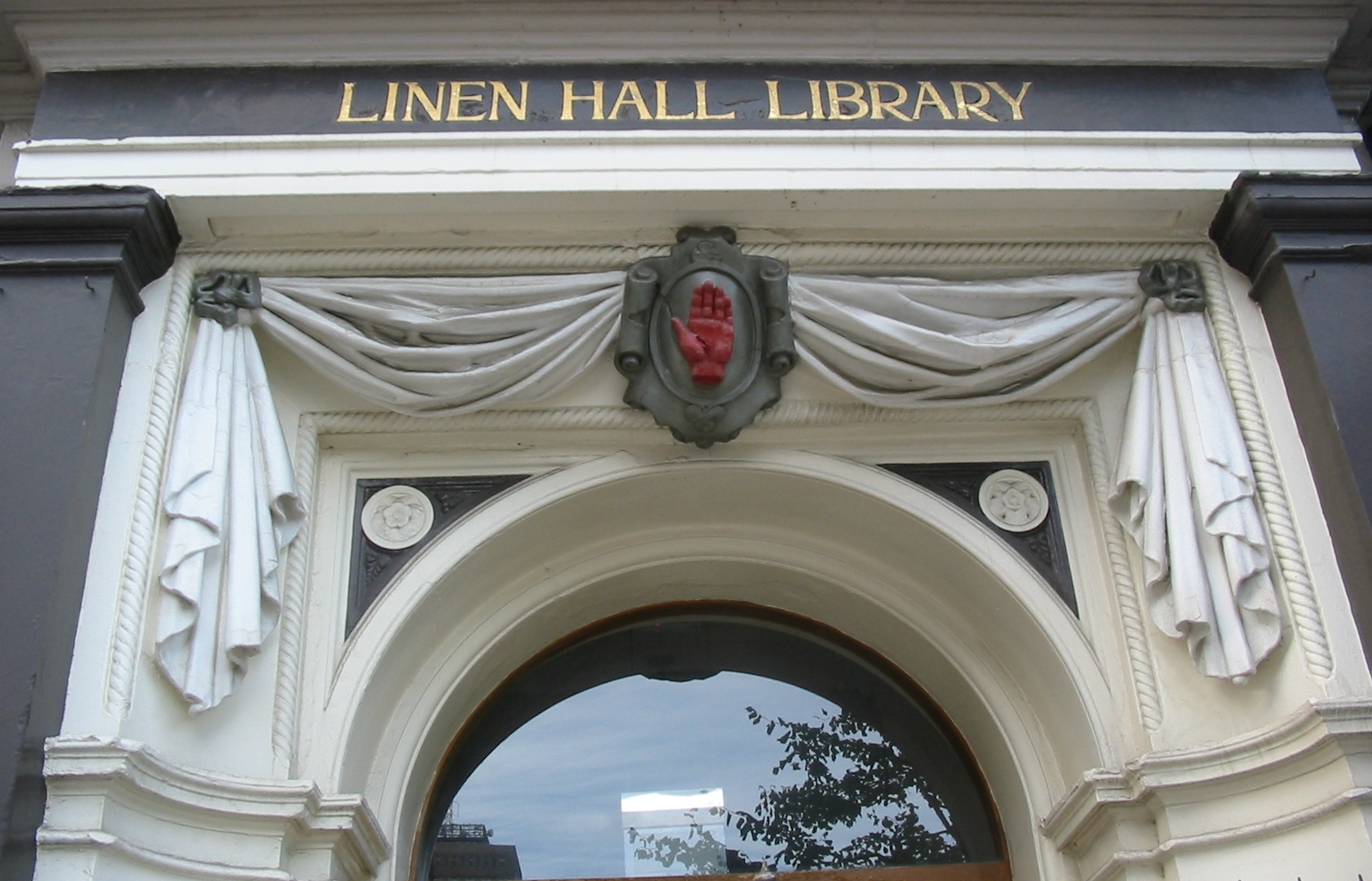
Linen Hall Library

For over two hundred years, Belfast has been a cultural and academic centre giving it the nickname the Athens of Ireland. In fact in 1841, J. Stirling Coyne wrote about Belfast "so celebrated has this town become for its patronage and love of learning, that it has acquired the proud title of the modern Athens".

In 2003, Belfast had an unsuccessful bid for the 2008 European Capital of Culture. The ambitious bid was run by an independent company called Imagine Belfast and boasted that it would "make Belfast the meeting place of Europe's legends where the meaning of history and belief find a home and a sanctuary from caricature, parody and oblivion." Belfast's bid was based on three main themes: "Through the eyes of a Child", "Made in Belfast", and "To live without walls". These themes of unity and peace and creating a better city for our children became the core of the Imagine Belfast bid. Ultimately the bid may have been wrecked by the city's history and volatile politics.

Imagine Belfast spent £1.2 million of public money and £100,000 of private funding in developing their bid. However, Belfast City Council insist this money was not wasted. The legacy of the failed bid was a new Culture and Arts Plan 2003–2006 to take forward the spirit of the Imagine Belfast bid. The chief executive of Belfast City Council described the bid as "a catalytic event leading to a step change in the development of arts and culture in the city". Indeed, the statistics show this to be true. In 2004–05, culture and arts events in Belfast were attended by 1.8 million people (400,000 more than the previous year). The same year, 80,000 people participated in culture and arts activities, twice as many as in 2003–04.

As Belfast becomes more prosperous and its citizens have more disposable income, culture and the arts are becoming economically important to the city. Belfast City Council has promoted culture with the goals of encouraging creativity, bringing communities together to facilitate reconciliation, and creating new jobs. In 2004–05 culture and arts initiatives created the equivalent of 413 full-time jobs (37% more than the previous year).

A combination of relative peace, international investment and an active promotion of arts and culture is attracting more tourists to Belfast than ever before. 5.9 million people visited Belfast in 2004–05 (up 10% from the previous year) and spent £262.5 million.

== Festivals ==
Féile an Phobail claims to be Belfast's largest festival and further claims to be one of the biggest community festivals in Europe. It hosts an annual Summer-time festival of Irish and International culture that takes place in and around the Falls Road in Belfast as well as smaller festivals throughout the year, such as Féile an Earraigh, the Spring festival. It has hosted the likes of Altan, Mairéad Ní Mhaonaigh, Westlife and Girls Aloud and also hosts political discussions and debates with international guests.

Queens University hosted and funded the annual international Belfast Festival until 2015. The Festival covers all art forms including theatre, dance, classical music, literature, jazz, comedy, visual arts, folk music and popular music, and attracting over 50,000 visitors, making it the largest of its kind in Ireland. 2007 will see the 45th anniversary of the festival.

Tennents Vital is popular festival held in Boucher Playing Fields in August each year. Belsonic is another annual August music festival held in the redeveloped Titanic Quarter

== Performance arts and film ==
Belfast has one major theatre, The Lyric. It is the only full-time producing theatre in the jurisdiction. The Lyric theatre is where film star Liam Neeson began his career and local playwrights Martin Lynch and Marie Jones have both written plays for the theatre. Kenneth Branagh, another British film actor, was also born in Belfast. The Old Museum Arts Centre is a 19th-century building in the city centre which runs a programme of music, theatre, comedy, dance workshops, and a ground floor art gallery with regular exhibitions.

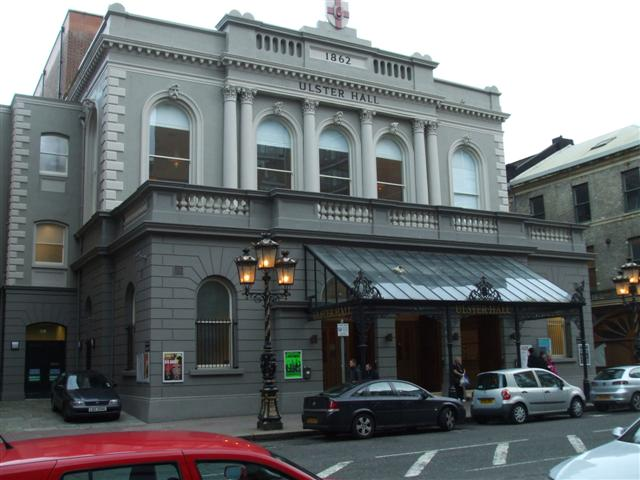
The Ulster Hall

Belfast has several venues for performing arts. The Grand Opera House, completed in 1895, was bombed several times during the Troubles but has been restored to its former glory. The Ulster Hall (1859–1862) was originally designed for grand dances but is now used primarily as a concert and sporting venue. Lloyd George, Parnell and Patrick Pearse all attended political rallies there. It holds 13 paintings of Belfast History. The Mulholland organ costing 3000 guineas was donated and named after a local wealthy industrialist. The Waterfront Hall was opened in 1997 as part of the redevelopment of the Laganside and already has become an icon of modern Belfast.

The Belfast Film Festival is a growing annual film festival in the city which started in the mid-1990s. Belfast has been taking full advantage of a new tax deal which makes Northern Ireland more attractive as a film location.

Parts of the film "Closing the Ring" were shot in Belfast, namely on Cave Hill.

== Visual arts ==
Belfast has produced some significant artists. Sir John Lavery (1856–1941) was best known for his portraits of rich and famous of his day, while William Conor (1881–1968) and Paul Henry changed how the rest of the world viewed Ireland at the time. Belfast has numerous art galleries including Catalyst Arts and the photography gallery Belfast Exposed and is home to the photography magazine Source. The University of Ulster's Art and Design Campus in Belfast's Cathedral Quarter has undergone a £30 million development programme.

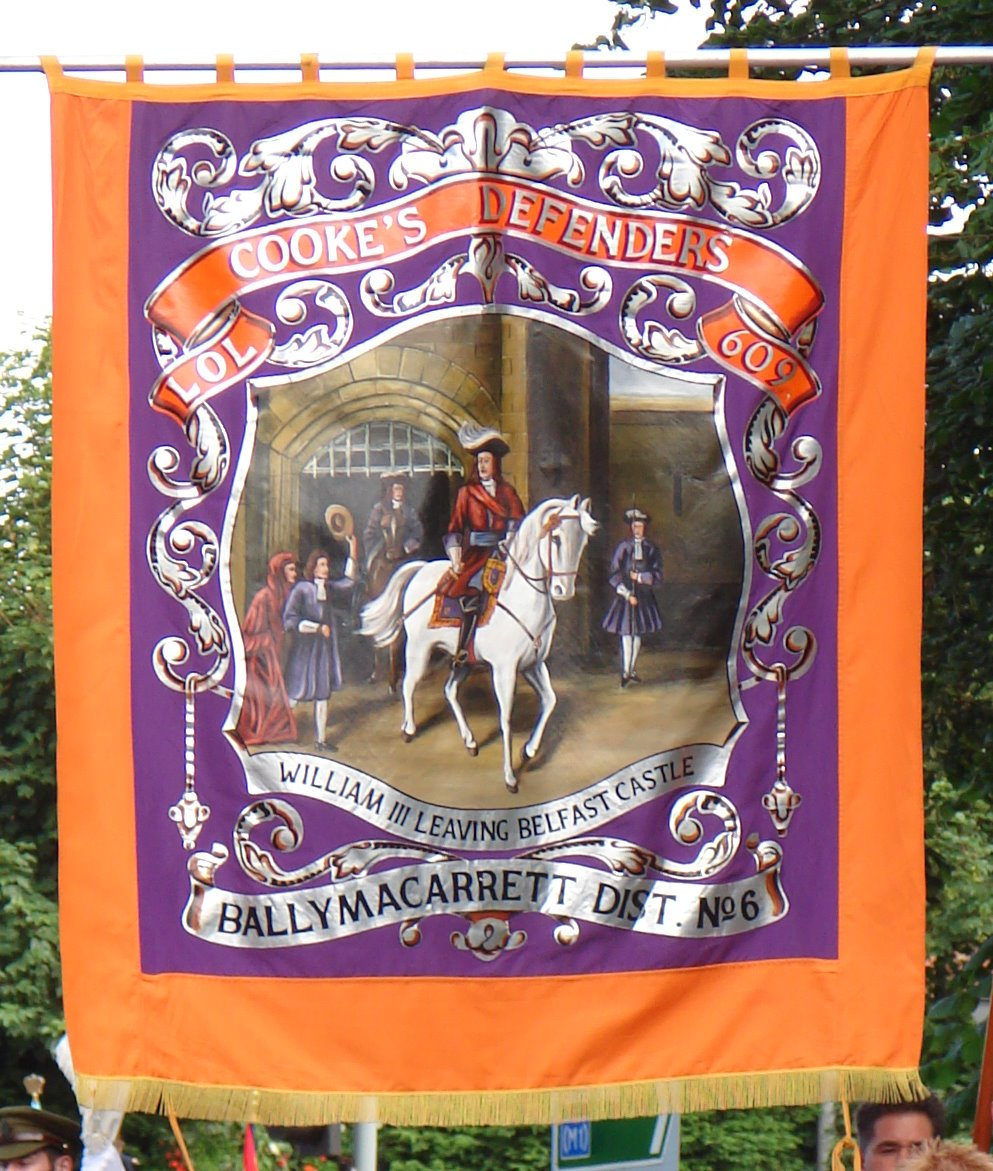
An Orange Order banner depicting William III in Belfast.

Sections of the city contain numerous sectarian murals, political street art reflecting the political and religious allegiances of the communities living there. Areas such as the Shankill Road contain murals that are almost entirely Protestant, depicting republican violence, loyalty to the British Crown, the Ulster Volunteer Force and Ulster Defence Association. Conversely, murals in areas such as the Falls Road, which is almost entirely Roman Catholic, feature political themes such as a united Ireland and the Provisional IRA, as well as traditional folklore and the Irish language. The Gaelic folk hero Cúchulainn has appeared on both republican and loyalist murals, representing the heroic Celtic past for the former and legendary battles between Ulster and the other provinces for the latter. In recent years some paramilitary murals have been replaced, in both loyalist and republican areas, with less controversial images. These include murals to the writer C. S. Lewis and the late Belfast footballer George Best.

Another popular form of folk art is banners for societies such as the Orange Order, the Ancient Order of Hibernians, the Apprentice Boys of Derry, and the Royal Black Institution. These are typically painted on silk and are carried in annual parades such as those on Saint Patrick's Day and the Twelfth of July. While wall murals tend to be of mixed artistic quality, banners are usually painted by professionals and are of a high standard. Because marching plays a much bigger role in Northern Irish Protestant culture than Catholic, the majority of banners depict Protestant, unionist or loyalist subjects. Of these the most common is William III of England, whose victory in the Battle of the Boyne is celebrated each year on 12 July. In addition to 'King Billy', Orange Order banners can depict a wide variety of other subjects, including the Crown and Bible; Biblical scenes; scenes from Ulster-related history including the Battle of the Somme; local landmarks; Britannia; and deceased members of the Order. Apprentice Boys' banners typically depict scenes from the Siege of Derry but can also show other unionist topics or deceased members of the organisation. The banners of the Royal Black Institution mostly show Biblical scenes. Catholic banners, also depict a variety of subjects, with Hibernia (the Irish equivalent of Britannia); Saint Patrick; and various nationalist heroes being popular. Trade unions in Northern Ireland sometimes also march with banners.

The Belfast International Tattoo is a large-scale indoor event in Belfast that showcases a variety of musical and marching displays. The Belfast Tattoo, which has been running since 2013, is a modern interpretation of the traditional military tattoo, similar to the Royal Edinburgh Military Tattoo. The event brings together pipe bands, marching bands, Highland dancers, and military performers from both Northern Ireland and around the world. The event runs annual and is a celebration of music, pageantry, and military tradition.

== Music ==
In recent years, the development of world class venues like the Waterfront Hall and the Odyssey has meant that Belfast now regularly attracts big name stars who previously would have played in Dublin or Glasgow.

Van Morrison, one of the most influential vocalists in Rock and Roll history was born and grew up in Belfast. His prolific and ongoing career spans over five decades. Growing up with Morrison on Hyndford Street, George Cassidy (jazz musician) taught Morrison tenor saxophone and music notation lessons. Cassidy, who specialised in tenor saxophone, also played clarinet, hurdy-gurdy and lap steel guitar. Belfast is also home to Brian Kennedy, a popular singer-songwriter, and the punk group Stiff Little Fingers. Derry rockers, The Undertones were regular visitors to the University of Ulster's student union building. They made their name when Belfast record shop owner Terry Hooley released the Teenage Kicks EP on his Good Vibrations label in September 1978. Belfast has a growing club scene. David Holmes has represented the city as a DJ, musician and composer and Colin Murray has previously been a regular DJ on BBC Radio 1.

Belfast has a longstanding history of underground clubs mainly orchestrated by DJ/promoter Christopher McCafferty. The city's rich industrial heritage provides the venues for the scene.

In the classical arena, the Ulster Orchestra, Northern Ireland's only professional symphony orchestra, has been running since 1966. Belfast musicians, Sir James Galway, The Man With the Golden Flute and Barry Douglas, a classical pianist have both made an impact on the world stage.

Also the band Snow Patrol made their song "Take back the city tonight" which was inspired by the city of Belfast. They lived not far away in the town of Bangor.

The local Republican rap trio Kneecap have experienced both popularity and controversy while helping to popularise the Irish language among young people.

== Literature ==
Belfast has been home to a number of significant, novelists, poets and playwrights. C. S. Lewis, author of The Chronicles of Narnia, was born in Belfast as were Brian Moore, Bernard MacLaverty, Glenn Patterson and Robert McLiam Wilson. Poet Louis MacNeice was born in the city. Seamus Heaney, Paul Muldoon, Michael Longley and Ciarán Carson were poet participants in The Belfast Group. Contemporary poets writing in and about Belfast would include Leontia Flynn, Medbh McGuckian and Sinéad Morrissey.

History Hub Ulster is a research group, news blog, video creator, archivist, content writer and book publisher based in Belfast, that hold events involving local history.

== See also ==
- Architecture of Belfast
- Culture of Northern Ireland
- Culture of Ireland
- Culture of the United Kingdom
- Notable Belfast people
- List of public art in Belfast
