= HHU =

HHU refer to:

- Heinrich Heine University in Düsseldorf, Germany
- History Hub Ulster, archivists, research group, Northern Ireland
- Hohai University in Nanjing, Jiangsu, China
- Huaihua University in Huaihua, Hunan, China
