= Military bands of the United Kingdom =

Musical ensembles maintained by the British uniformed services

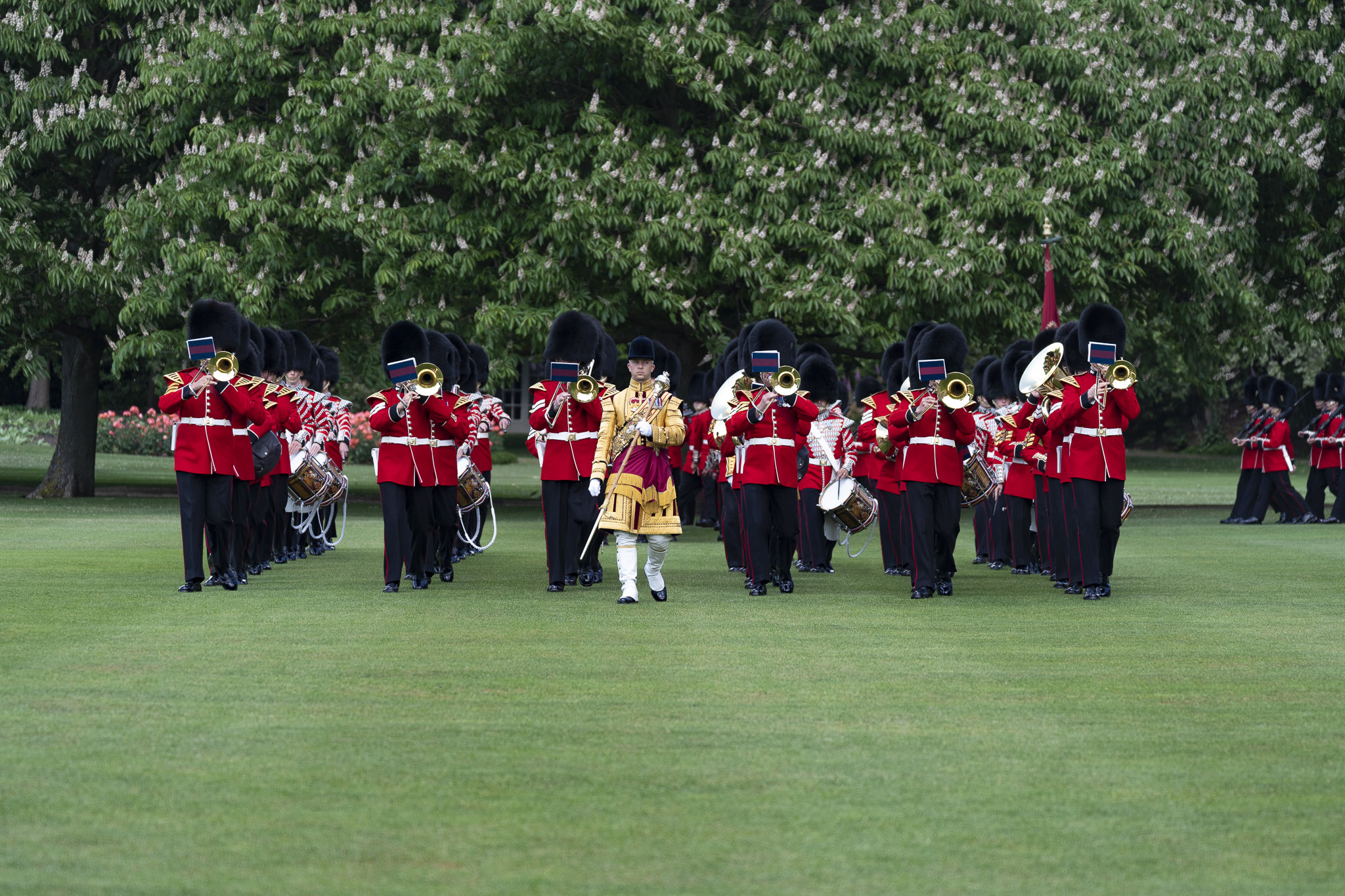
The Band of the Grenadier Guards marching outside Buckingham Palace.

The military bands of the United Kingdom are musical units that serve for protocol and ceremonial duties as part of the British Armed Forces. They have been the basis and inspiration for many military bands in the former British Empire and the larger Commonwealth of Nations as well as musical organizations in other countries. Military musical units with British influence include United States military bands, the Japan Ground Self-Defense Force Music Corps and the Military Band of Athens. British military bands are controlled by the military music departments of the three services that compose the armed forces. These include the Royal Marines Band Service (Royal Navy), the Royal Corps of Army Music (British Army), and the Royal Air Force Music Services (Royal Air Force). British style brass bands and carnival bands were then and are currently inspired by the British Armed Forces and its brass bands, especially of the Army's regular and reserve formations, as they follow a similar format as it relates to brass and percussion (plus optional woodwind) instruments.

== History ==
=== Early development, medieval era and 17th century ===
British military music was unsophisticated until the Crusades (from the late 11th century). Trumpeters and drummers in the field sufficed as a medium for communication, as did pipers, and later fifers, whose further remit was to frighten the enemy. Casualty clearance and first aid became their dual roll. The oldest military band in the British military is the Royal Artillery Band, which traces its origins back to 1557 at the Battle of St. Quentin. King Charles II of England studied French Army music during the reign of King Louis XIV of France. Upon regaining the throne, he began implementing French musical traditions. 1678 saw the introduction of six hautbois instruments in the Band of the Horse Grenadier Guards. Most British regiments of the line adopted this new instrumentation by 1690.

=== 18th and 19th centuries ===
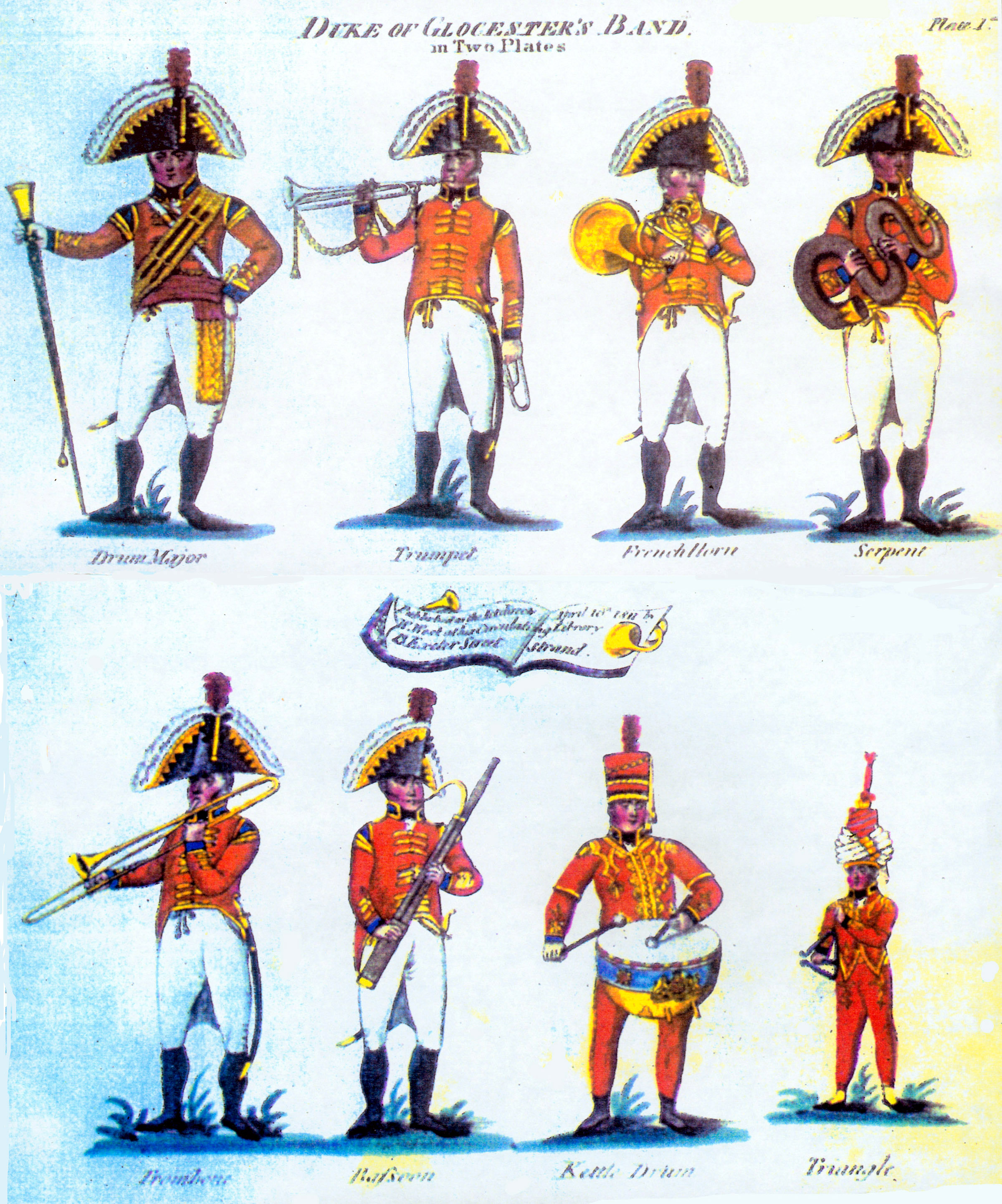
The Duke of Gloucester's Band in 1811.

During the 17th and 18th centuries, soldiers marched to the beat of the drum from the day they were recruited in their localities. Drummers, many of them teenagers by the time they were recruited, were also responsible for punishing soldiers who were sentenced to be flogged with whips. The average age of the 304 drummers at Waterloo was 25, with about 10% being boys under 16. The Artillery Band, which were mere "drumme and phifes" for close to 200 years until 1762, was made 'official' that year. Regimental bands in the Foot Guards were first formed between 1783 and 1785. The 1st Foot Guards Band was known as the Duke of York's Band and the 3rd Foot Guards band was known as the Duke of Gloucester's Band. In 1854, during the Crimean War, a parade in Scutari (nowadays Turkey), to celebrate the Queen Victoria's birthday was held, during which twenty British Army bands performed the national anthem. As a result of the bands playing God Save the Queen in different instrumentations and key signatures, the Royal Military School of Music was established that year as the primary training school for all musicians of the army's military bands. In the corps of drums of the line infantry units, while fifes and drums had been played for centuries, beginning in the 1850s bugles began to be adopted in such formations. Until 1837, Army bands sported the Turkish crescent as part of the band percussion section, a tradition introduced from the Ottoman Empire and its military bands in the 18th century.

While the Army's band tradition blossomed, this was also the case for the Royal Navy and through it, the Royal Marines, whose bands were present in almost every naval engagement since the first bands were established in 1664-65 under Army control, these would later be transferred to the RN in 1755. By the 18th century, Royal Marines bands were established in Deal, Chatham, Plymouth and Portsmouth, each providing musical support to RM units, as well as to all naval servicemen, stationed in these areas. In 1805, with the establishment of yet another division in Woolwich came the raising of yet another band.

It would only be in the late 19th century that the tradition of bands and bugles would arrive in the rifle regiments of the Army, as well as in the Gurkha units (which would later also adopt the Scottish tradition of pipes and drums). The bugle sections replaced the regular corps of drums of these units due to the use of the bugle instead of the drum as a signalling instrument for the rifle regiments due to their skirmishing role. It would only be in the 1960s when the tradition of bugle sections would be adopted by the light infantry regiments within the UK.

=== 20th century ===
By the early 20th Century, regimental infantry and cavalry bands in the British Army, were well-balanced, highly versatile groups of musicians. Their battlefield role dwindled with the advancement of technology and modern warfare. At the time, bugle and trumpet calls were still used to signal on the battlefield, with all other aspects remaining unused except for ceremonial events. During both the First and Second World Wars bandsmen would act as stretcher bearers, dispatch riders, and serve in other non-combatant roles, while the field musicians remained in the heavy weapons or combat support role. With the reduction in size of the army, the need for battalion and event to an extent, regimental bands became obsolete and were seen as a strain in the national economy rather than a cultural symbol. The same case happened to bands of the Royal Navy (including Royal Marines) and the Royal Air Force, even as both services began to follow the lead of the army with the formation of their schools of music in 1902 and 1918, respectively.

During the Second World War, aware of the growing need of women in service in the armed forces each service branch would create all-women's military bands. None of such bands exist today, but since 1991, when the RAF Music Services began including regular women musicians, all the branches of the British Armed Forces have bands made up of experienced musicians of both genders.

In 1947, the Royal Artillery Mounted, Portsmouth and Salisbury Plain bands, along with the bands of six of the larger Corps, were granted the status of staff bands, most of which were based at permanent locations. In 1984, four staff bands were disbanded and the remaining bands were reduced considerably. This hit regimental and battalion bands particularly hard, reducing their size to just 21 bandsmen. Most of the infantry regiments which then had three battalions instead opted for two bands with 35 bandsmen each.

=== Impact of Options for Change and present day ===
A series of army reviews were given in 1994, resulting in the reduction of the number of army military bands from 69 to 22 bands and with that, the number of personnel decreased from 2,000 to 1,100. At the time of the changes, bands in regiments/corps of the British Army usually had four bands (attached to battalions). Unit bands were being merged and branch bands began to be created, and in order to create a uniform administration for these formations the Royal Corps of Army Music was created. Similarly, the Royal Marines went through a reorganization of its bands. This officially brought an end to the long history of regular regimental bands. The Government of the United Kingdom justified this action by saying that it will see money in the budget. The year prior music critic Richard Morrison of The Times noted: "One of the oddest statistics about British cultural life is that the Defence Ministry spends more to maintain military bands than the government spends on all the professional orchestras and opera companies in the country."

== Classifications ==
=== British Army ===
==== State bands in London ====
A "state band" refers to a military band based in London, the national capital, and has particular public duties in serving the British royal family and representing the British Armed Forces.

===== Bands of the Household Division and the Household Cavalry =====
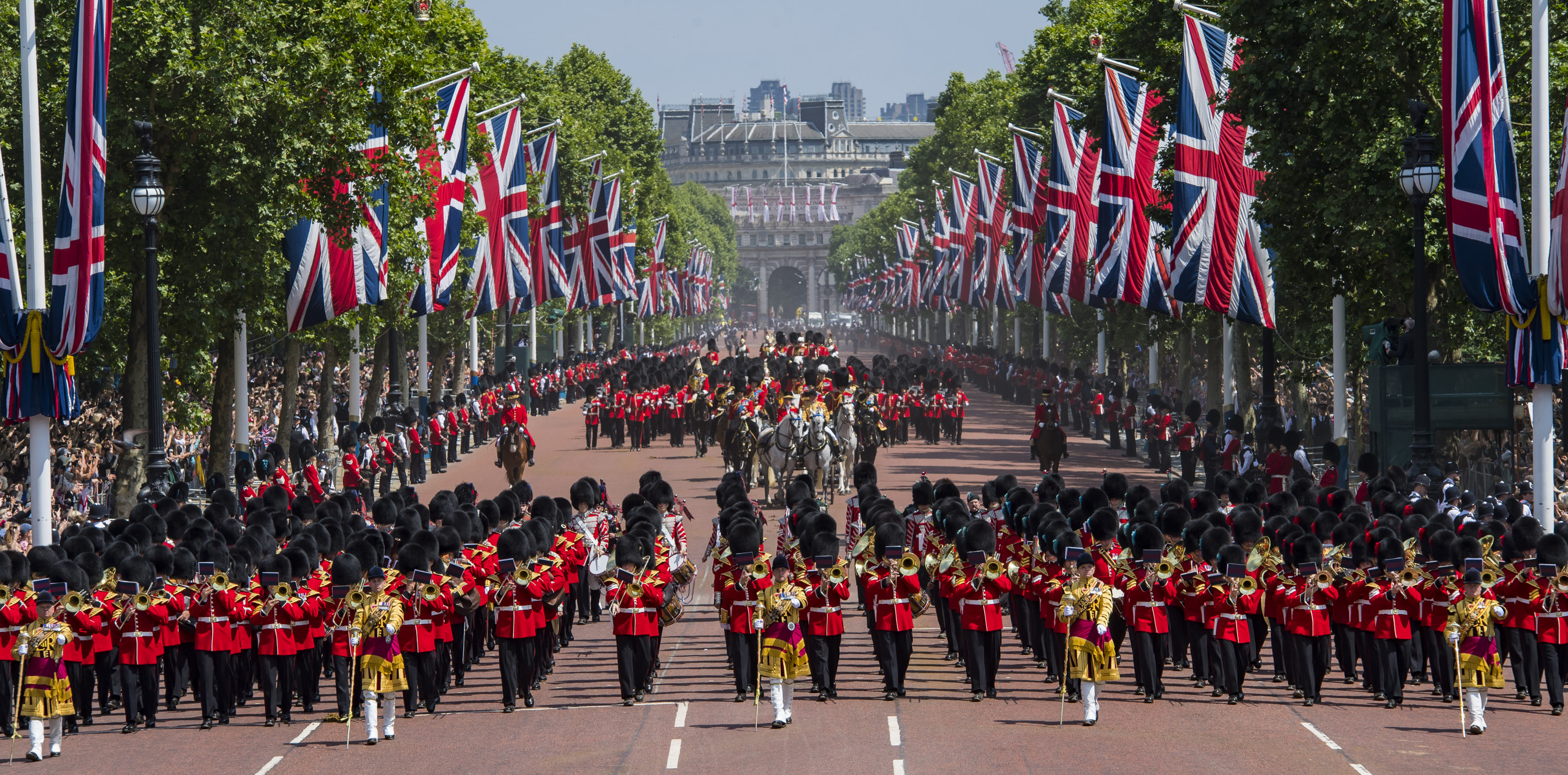
The Bands of the Household Division lead the procession of the Royal Family's return from Trooping the Colour in 2018.

The Bands of the Household Division are the amalgamated five military bands of the Foot Guards regiments in London. It performs during public duties events in the capital, particularly those that involve the British royal family. It consists of the following regimental bands:

- Band of the Grenadier Guards
- Band of the Coldstream Guards
- Band of the Scots Guards
- Band of the Irish Guards
- Band of the Welsh Guards

The massed bands numbers around 250 musicians who report directly to RCAM rather than their home regiments. They commonly perform during the Changing of the Guard ceremony at Buckingham Palace, as well as larger ceremonies such as the annual Trooping the Colour.

Similarly, both the Household Cavalry regiments have a unified mounted band, the Mounted Band of the Household Cavalry (since 2014) and also their own regimental quick and slow marches. It also reports to RCAM, and it represents the whole of the Household Cavalry.

The Mounted Band of the Household Cavalry and the Massed Bands of the Household Division perform at Trooping the Colour, an annual ceremony held every June on Horse Guards Parade to mark the official King's Birthday celebrations. The Massed Bands and the Mounted Band play a central role in this ceremony. The term "Massed Bands" denotes the formation of more than one separate band performing together, whether belonging to one or more regiments, or indeed countries.

===== Other state bands =====
The Royal Artillery Band (being the oldest band in the British Army), was the last regular army band to be accorded "state band" status. It lost this status when it, along with the Royal Artillery, vacated Woolwich Barracks in 2007. The band held the status of a state band twice before, during the reigns of King George II, King George III, and Queen Victoria. It was often in demand for important state and public duties, and was the favourite band of major figures such as King George IV, Princess Victoria of Saxe-Coburg-Saalfeld, Queen Victoria, and Prime Minister Winston Churchill. The number of regular army state bands, was further reduced on 1 September 2014, when the Band of the Life Guards and the Band of The Blues and Royals were merged. At around the same time the Bands of the Honourable Artillery Company and the Royal Yeomanry in the Army Reserve were both granted State Band status.

==== Regional bands ====
In 2019, the regular Army reorganized bands to a new co-location practice in which 11 of the smaller bands in three major garrisons and Sandhurst has increased the flexibility of the Corps of Music to perform at a larger number of events. These bands are organised as follows:

- British Army Bands Catterick
  - Band of the Royal Armoured Corps
  - Band of The King's Division
  - Band of the Corps of Royal Electrical and Mechanical Engineers
- British Army Bands Colchester
  - Band of the Parachute Regiment
  - Band of the Army Air Corps
  - Band of the Queen's Division
- British Army Bands Sandhurst
  - Band of the Royal Logistic Corps
  - Band of the Royal Corps of Signals
- British Army Bands Tidworth
  - Royal Artillery Band
  - Band of the Corps of Royal Engineers
  - Band of the Adjutant General's Corps
- Band of the Royal Regiment of Scotland
- Band and Bugles of The Rifles
- Band of the Brigade of Gurkhas
- Band of the Prince of Wales

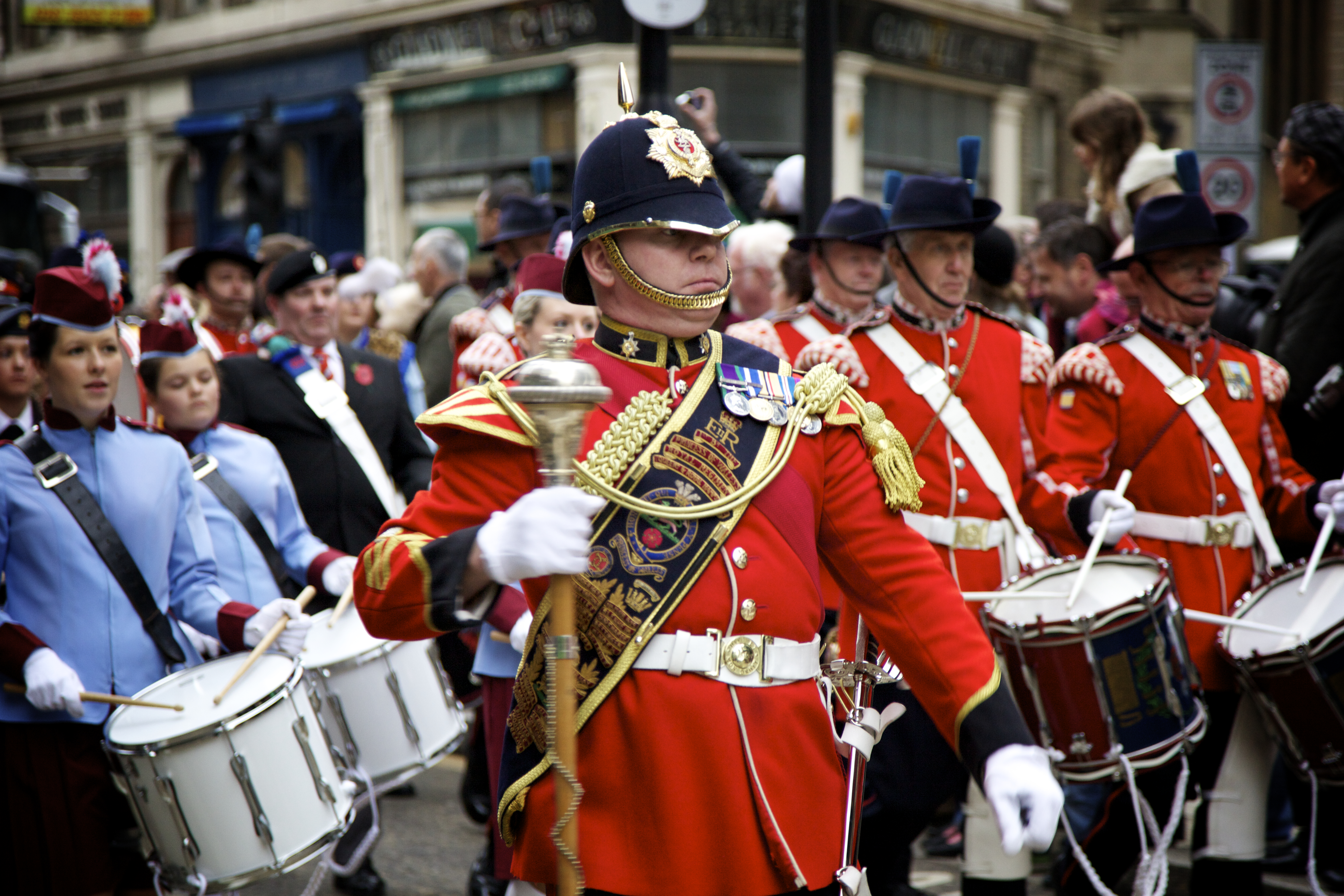
The Princess of Wales's Royal Regiment's Corp of Drums at the Lord Mayor's Show in 2010

The British Army also has 20 Reserve Military Bands located across the United Kingdom and across the world:

- England:
  - Band of the Honourable Artillery Company
  - The Inns of Court and City Yeomanry (Band of the Royal Yeomanry)
  - Lancashire Artillery Volunteers Band
  - The Nottinghamshire Band of the Royal Engineers
  - The (Northern) Band of the Royal Corps of Signals
  - Band of the Duke of Lancaster's Regiment (King's Lancashire and Border)
  - Band of the Yorkshire Regiment (14th/15th, 19th & 33rd/76th Foot)
  - Band of the Royal Regiment of Fusiliers
  - Band of the Royal Anglian Regiment
  - Band of the Princess of Wales's Royal Regiment (Queen's and Royal Hampshires)
  - The Band of the Mercian Regiment
  - The Salamanca Band of The Rifles
  - The Waterloo Band of The Rifles
  - Band of 150 Regiment, Royal Logistic Corps
  - Band of the Army Medical Services
- Scotland:
  - Lowland Band of the Royal Regiment of Scotland
  - Highland Band of the Royal Regiment of Scotland
- Wales:
  - Band of the Royal Welsh - The only Brass Band in the Army Reserve
- Northern Ireland:
  - Band of The Royal Irish Regiment (27th (Inniskilling) 83rd and 87th and Ulster Defence Regiment)
- Overseas:
  - Volunteer Band of the Royal Gibraltar Regiment
  - Band and Corps of Drums of the Royal Bermuda Regiment

These bands range in personnel number from 64 to 15 and include the traditional marching, mounted and concert bands, as well as rock bands and a show bands.

=== Royal Marines ===
The Royal Marines Band Service is organized into six regional bands:

- Band of HM Royal Marines, Portsmouth (HMS Nelson)
- Band of HM Royal Marines, Plymouth (HMS Raleigh)
- Band of HM Royal Marines, Scotland (HMS Caledonia, Rosyth)
- Band of HM Royal Marines, HMS Collingwood (formerly the Band of Britannia Royal Naval College)
- Band of HM Royal Marines, Commando Training Centre Royal Marines
- Band of the Royal Marines School of Music, Portsmouth

=== Royal Air Force ===
The Royal Air Force Music Services also maintains a number of military bands, which are as follows:

- Central Band of the Royal Air Force
- Band of the Royal Air Force College
- Band of the Royal Air Force Regiment
- Band of the Royal Auxiliary Air Force
- Royal Air Force Salon Orchestra

The RAF also maintains a number of voluntary bands, which are:

- RAF Akrotiri Voluntary Band
- RAF Cosford Voluntary Band
- RAF Halton Voluntary Band
- RAF Honington Voluntary Band
- RAF Lossiemouth Voluntary Band
- RAF St Athan Voluntary Band
- RAF Waddington Voluntary Band
- RAF Wyton Area Voluntary Band

=== Civil-military bands ===
There are various volunteer reservist bands affiliated with the British military, mirroring and styling themselves after regular forces bands. For example,British Imperial Military Band The Royal British Legion maintains its own marching/concert bands, patterned under the Royal Navy. The various uniformed military cadet organizations have their own bands that use the same aforementioned formations. All Army Cadet Force and Royal Air Force Air Cadets share their bands and use the general formation used in both services (the exception being that several RAF Air Cadet bands such as the National Marching Band have drums corps at the front of their formations similarly to the naval service). The Sea Cadet Corps (United Kingdom), Royal Marines Volunteer Cadet Corps and the Combined Cadet Force bands utilize the standard musical practices of the RM.

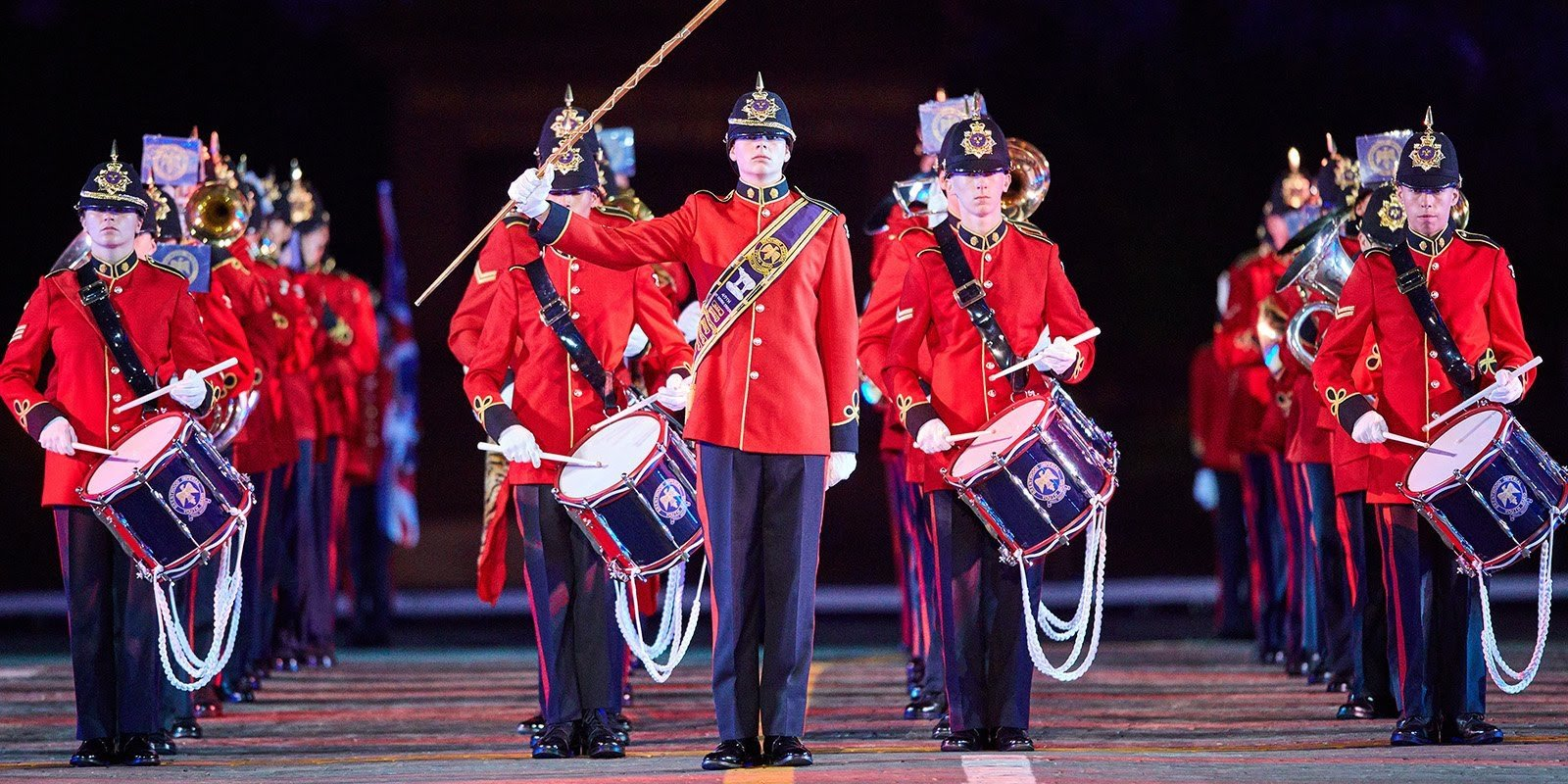
Brentwood Imperial Youth Band

The Duke of York's Royal Military School Ceremonial Band is the largest outside the Ministry of Defence and is larger than the Bands of the Foot Guards. The RMS Band is organized similarly to that of the RM.

=== Colonial bands ===
The first recorded instance of a local colonial military band was in 1653 in the New Hampshire militia.

Notable British colonial unit bands include but are not limited to:

- Band of the King's African Rifles
- Band of the Royal Hong Kong Regiment
- Bombay Sappers Band
- Band of the Royal Grenadiers
- Band of the New South Wales Corps
- Band of the 73rd (Perthshire) Regiment of Foot

=== Pipe bands ===
The Scottish Highlands was where the modern Great Highland Bagpipe was developed. It can be traced directly to the MacCrimmon family in the Isle of Skye, who were hereditary Pipers to the MacLeods between 1600 and 1825. With the establishment of a regular army in Scotland, the Scottish regiments of infantry played a major role in the development of the pipe band tradition in the whole of Great Britain. Between 1740 and 1840, Highland Chiefs who raised Regiments had personal Pipers to accompany with them. It was only in 1854 that pipers were recognised officially by the War Office as distinct roles. Army pipe bands were developed around the mid-1800s, when regimental pipers and drummers performed during long route marches. The head piper became known as the Pipe Major, modelled after the drum major. As the British Empire expanded, so its Scottish troops travelled the world taking with them their national music. In the mid to late 1800s the Scottish form soon would be adopted by the British Army in Ireland for soldiers coming from units of Irish descent, and they are still in use today. Bagpipes are generally considered to be a motivational tool for British troops, particularly those of Scottish and Irish descent.

Today the pipes and drums of British Army and Royal Air Force formations contain bagpipes and a percussion section of bass drums, Scottish form tenor drums (save for the Brigade of Gurkhas, whose pipe bands do not have these) and highland snare/side drums. These bands are led by a Drum Major with the Pipe Major being the seniormost bagpiper in the unit. All bagpipers carry the pipe banners of their units with their instruments. All the members of these formations wear Scottish/Irish/Gurkha full dress uniforms, with the flat cap for the Brigade of Gurkhas, tartan kilts in unit colours and black feather bonnets for those of Scottish formations, and the caubeen and brown kilts for both the Irish Guards and the Royal Irish Regiment. The drummers of both the Scots and Irish Guards wear their bearskins in full dress.

=== Band and Bugles ===
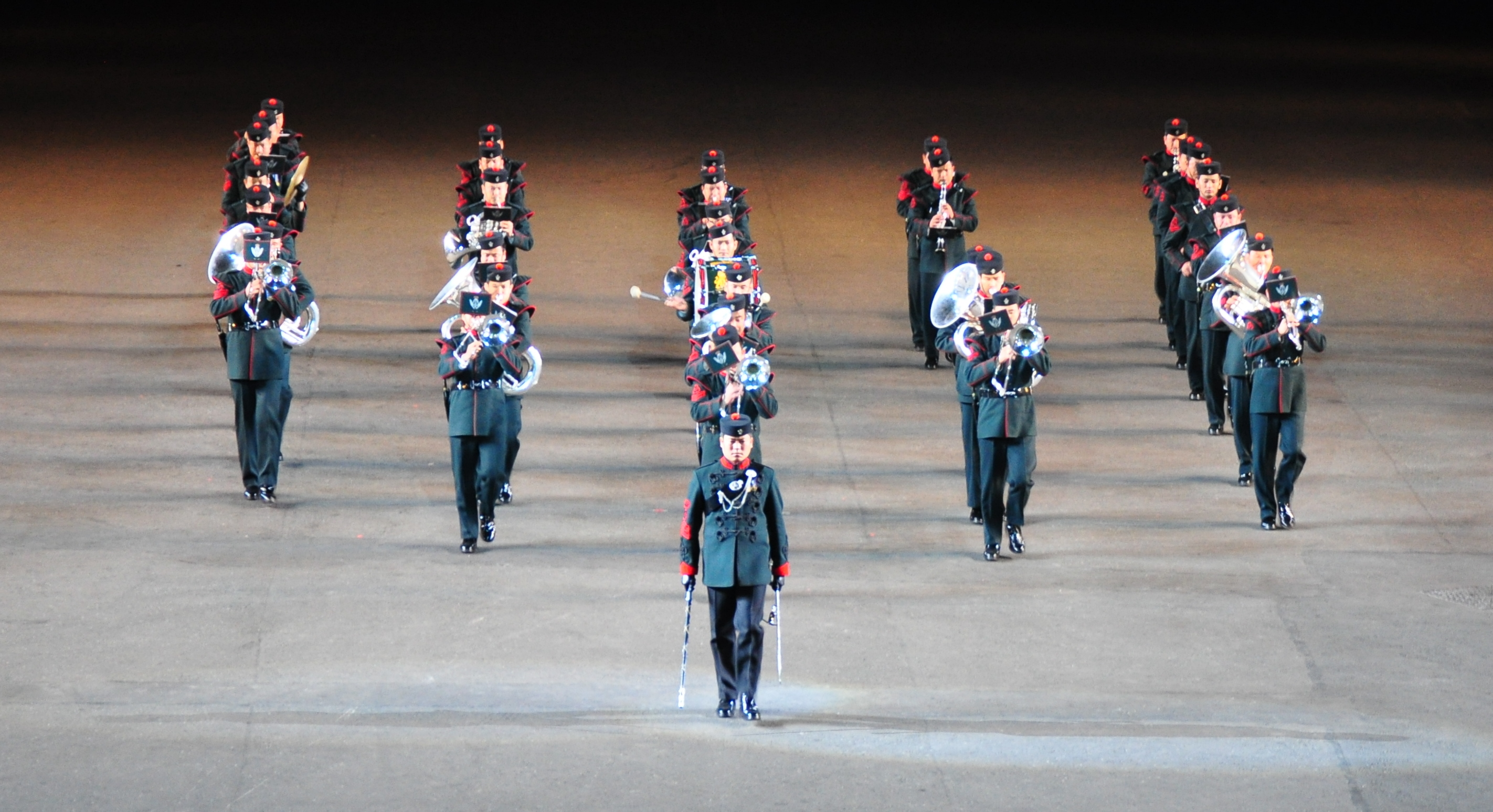
The Band of the Brigade of Gurkhas during the Royal Edinburgh Military Tattoo in 2010.

The use of the silver bugle was pioneered by The Rifles (and its predecessor regiments) as a way of communicating on the battlefield. Their use date back to practices developed during the Napoleonic Wars and even as far back as the American Revolutionary War. Buglers are trained to play the bugle and a fast march of 140 paces per minute. They sound a bugle call followed by a quick drum beat to signal a quick march, which is a break of tradition for regular bands that use a regular drum beat. These types of bands never performs slow marches except during occasions that require it (i.e. Trooping of the Colour, Presentation of Colours, Changing of the King's Guard).

Today, the Band and Bugles of The Rifles is the only one of its kind and with that specific naming custom in the British Army. The Band of the Brigade of Gurkhas also has similar customs to the former bands and bugles of the Light Division. Just like in the former bands of the rifle and Gurkha infantry regiments these bands are led by a Bugle Major, assisted by the Director of Music or Bandmaster. The Band of the Rifles maintains the traditional bugle platoon stationed at the head of the band made up of buglers from each of the battalions, a tradition formerly in force in the bands of the rifle regiments. Since 2007, the Band of the Brigade of Gurkhas has a small bugle section mirroring that of the Rifles, a tradition formerly of the military bands of each of the Gurkha rifle battalions and regiments. In addition, the reserve Band of the Royal Irish Regiment (under the Army Reserve) is modelled after that of The Rifles, as the regiment, while maintaining the traditions of the former namesake unit disbanded in 1922 following the Irish War of Independence, honours the traditions of both the light infantry Royal Irish Rangers and the line infantry Ulster Defence Regiment, themselves successors to the long line of line and light infantry regiments of Irish service in the regular and reserve ranks of the Army.

=== Corps of Drums ===
Corps of drums are a common occurrence in the armed forces, particularly the army and the navy. Operationally, corps of drums are deployed as a specialist platoon that serve as assault pioneers or force protection. Having previously carried a shortsword bearing the Royal Cypher as a weapon, many also carry an SA80 bayonet as an alternative. Each infantry battalion except for the Royal Regiment of Scotland, Royal Irish Regiment and the two remaining Rifle Regiments (Rifles and Royal Gurkha Rifles), as well as the Royal Marines maintain corps of drums. They were previously a part of formations of the Royal Air Force.

The main instrument used is a snare drum, the latest version (97s-pattern) of which include a metal rod-tension and plastic heads. Another instrument used is the five key flute, typically pitched in B-flat. Common tunes such as The British Grenadiers and Hazelmere are traditionally played by military corps of drums. A range of percussion instruments such as a bass drum, tenor drums and cymbals (plus the optional glockenspiel) are also used addition to the previously mentioned instruments. All musicians save for the bass drummers, tenor drummers and cymbalists carry bugles with their instruments, which they also play not just bugle calls but also a number of marches. Notable corps of drums are maintained in units such as the Honourable Artillery Company and the Royal Logistic Corps. In the RLC, the corps of drums of that formation is more of a drumline that is famed for a "black light" display, which is a modern touch that makes it very distinct from its predecessors and counterparts.

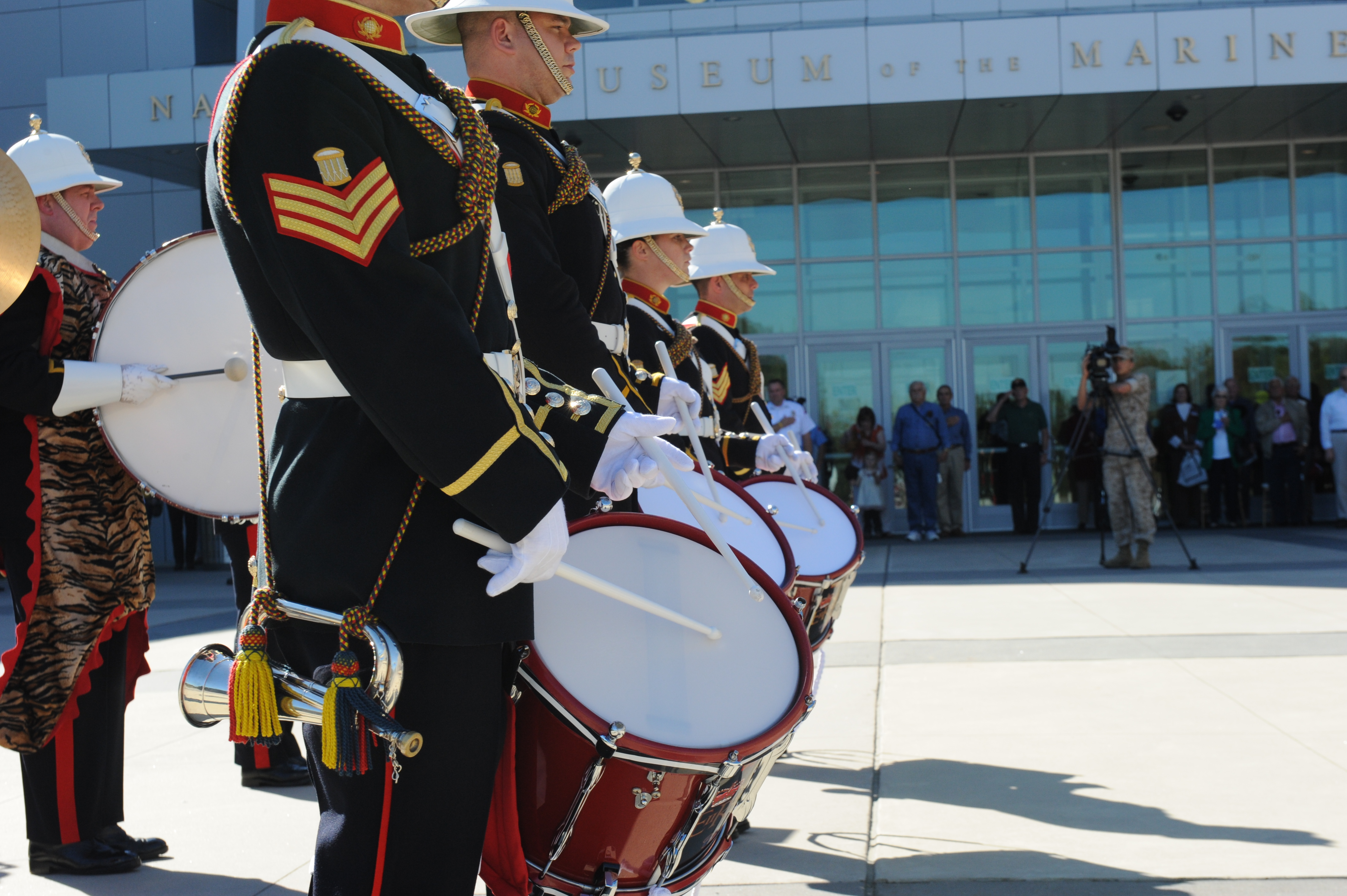
Royal Marines Corps of Drums

Buglers in the Royal Marines are also trained side drummers and are situated at the front of the band. They also have experience in Herald Fanfare Trumpets. They trace themselves to the raising of the RM in 1664 with six drummers attached to each of the foundation companies that made up the first regiment of marines in the UK. Today, there are 60 buglers of the RM who carry out duties ranging from repatriation services to mass displays. All are qualified members of the Royal Marines Band Service and are alumni of the prestigious Royal Marines School of Music. Until 1949, all RM units, as well as the wider Royal Navy, sported separate corps of drums, today, they form a vital part of all the six bands of the RMBS.

Drummers in the 18th century were distinguished in their regimental "reversed colours" uniforms. For example, an infantry regiment that wore a red coat with yellow facings as its uniform would gave drummers who would wear yellow coats with red facings. Today corps of drums are allowed to parade in Army Combat Uniforms as well as full dress uniforms such as modern day versions of the aforementioned uniforms.

All corps of drums in the Army and the RM are led by a Drum Major, who is drawn from the ranks of the veteran drummers of the formation. In RM corps of drums, a Bugle Major serves as the senior drummer-bugler and second in command.

=== Mounted bands ===
For many years, beginning when timpani and fanfare trumpets were adopted by the cavalry of the old English military, a tradition that would be adopted in Scotland after the 1707 merger of the twin armies, the British Army sported a long and faithful tradition of mounted bands in the whole of the United Kingdom, first brass only and soon brass and woodwind mixed with the traditional timpani on drum horses and the fanfare trumpets. Up until the 1930s, each British Army cavalry regiment, as well as the Royal Horse Artillery, sported a mounted band with a mounted timpanist on the drum horse, with bands being occasionally massed up on parades. Until that decade, the timpani in the bands of the light cavalry units carried the battle honours of their respective formations, which would be the case until 1952, when guidons were reinstated. Almost all the bands became dismounted in the 1930s, with only the bands of the Household Cavalry's now current two regiments maintaining the long tradition. By then, the British Army's cavalry mounted band tradition had already spread to a number of Commonwealth countries.

Today, the sole 64-strong Mounted Band of the Household Cavalry, created in 2014 with the merger of the by now two surviving bands and thus is the largest of all the bands in the regular Army proper, maintains the long heritage and traditions of the mounted band in the United Kingdom, with the band sporting two drumhorses and mounted fanfare trumpeters in mounted formation. The band is led by a Director of Music, previously the case in the mounted staff bands (with bandmasters leading the regimental bands). In addition, the Royal Scots Dragoon Guards, the oldest regiment of the Royal Armoured Corps, maintains a drum horse and is very much unique in having a mounted timpanist who wears a distinctive white bearskin on the full dress, granted to that regiment by the late Tsar Nicholas II, the Colonel-in-Chief of the Royal Scots Greys (whose lineage is honoured by the current unit), who perished during the Russian Civil War in 1918. He wears, with the rest of said regiment, a black band on the peaked cap in remembrance of their honorary colonel worn with the service dress, but does not have that on the bearskin cap. The Queen's Royal Hussars also have a drum horse, but that regiment maintains the honour of being the only one with engraved battle honours on its timpani carried on parades, a tradition used by its predecessor units.

== Traditions ==
=== By service ===
==== Navy ====
All the Royal Marine Bands (and former Royal Navy bands) have a Corps of Drums in the lead of their bands and as part of the drumline, following the practice in the former line infantry regimental bands of the British Army. This tradition can be traced to 1902, when Lt. George Miller, then Senior Bandmaster of the Royal Marine Light Infantry, began adopting the practice in time for the Coronation Review that year in Aldershot, following the traditions of the line infantry bands of the Army. The tradition of such a formation has been later adopted by the bands of several Commonwealth armed forces. All are led by a Drum Major with the conductor/director of music stationed at the rear rank behind the band. The drummers of the corps, like their Army counterparts, carry the bugle.

The formation of bands in the RM are currently followed by the Royal Navy Volunteer Bands, all composed of volunteer musicians, either civilians, retired personnel or active musicians of the Armed Forces. All wear Royal Navy uniforms while some personnel wear the uniforms of their branch.

In April 2019, it was announced that the tiger skin pelts that are traditionally worn by Royal Marine drummers were to be replaced by synthetic fur. The tradition of wearing tiger skin for the bass and tenor drummers while on parade dates back to the 18th century, introduced by a number of African bandsmen who served in the bands of the RM during those times.

==== Army ====
The repertoire of army bands are distinct to the regiment/corps they belong. Army bands typically have first priority in the changing of the King's Guard at Buckingham Palace, with the Household Division (Foot Guards and the Band of the Household Cavalry) taking centerstage in most occasions. All personnel wear the full or service dress uniforms, the former with the facing or distinctive colours of their respective formations, save for the Household Cavalry, whose band uses in important occasions the 1665 State Dress, and the red full dress of the Foot Guards and the Royal Regiment of Fusiliers.

Until 1994, all Army active and reserve regimental bands of the line infantry (sans the Light Division) followed a similar band setup to that of the Royal Marines Band Service, and in many occasions the corps of drums of these regiments fronted up the band. When marching, the band's director of music is usually situated within the band's ranks while the drum major marches at the head of the formation. In line infantry regimental bands, the drum major fronted the combined formation at the front of the Corps of Drums/Pipes and Drums while the conductor or director of music was at the front of the trombone or tuba file rank of the band proper. Several bands however followed the Foot Guards tradition, stationing the snare drums at the front with the remainder of the corps in the rear ranks. Those of the Foot Guards bands have their drum major fronting the front rank of musicians, the director of music in the middle, and the corps of drums (and in the case of the Scots and Irish Guards, pipes and drums) at the rear ranks. In the light infantry, the bugle major led the band and bugles with the conductor or bandmaster marching besides him (and with the pipe band in between or at the rear for the Gurkha regiments, including the rifle infantry). Those of armoured formations and the Royal Artillery had bands that either followed the Guards Division practice or stationed tubas and euphoniums at the front rank, the latter done more appropriate when mounted on horseback.

==== Air Force ====
RAF Musicians wear a modified uniform which; from 2012, is worn with the peaked cap rather than the busby; which has been historically worn by the band. It is now referred to as Number 9 Service Dress. The tradition of the busby dates back from 1918, when the RAF was created, since the Royal Flying Corps, one of the two air forces that formed the branch, was composed of personnel from both the cavalry regiments and the Royal Engineers, however it was adopted by the service bands in the 1970s.

The formation on parade of the bandsmen of RAF Bands mirror those the Household Division.

It was the RAF Music Services that was the first to formally admit women in 1991, since then women wear the same uniforms as the male musicians.

=== Drum Major ===
Most military bands are issued a set of regalia, which typically include a baldric worn by the Drum-Major charged with the distinctive unit insignia of the unit to which the band is assigned and, frequently, other symbols as well such as miniature campaign streamers; a chrome mace carried by the Drum Major and engraved with the unit's name; and a special mural unique to the unit used to wrap the band's drums, which feature the battle honours of the reporting formation.

Drum majors often augment their uniforms with bearskin helmets, peaked caps, busby hats or pith helmets as headdress and white leather gauntlets. In the British Army, all the Scottish regiments, infantry, cavalry and artillery, as well as engineers, have their drum majors wear feather bonnets while some wore the glengarry and the balmoral bonnet when not in full dress. The Drum Majors of all RM bands wear the pith helmet as part of their full dress uniform. For those of the Foot Guards, their drum majors wear the 1665 State Dress as their full dress on royal occasions due to their role as personnel drummers to the King, who is the Colonel-in-Chief of all five regiments. This pattern is the very uniform commissioned by King Charles II for the drummers, trumpeters and timpanists of the Household Division then, and is in gold with the royal cypher of the reigning monarch and Colonel in Chief of the Household Division, with the cypher on the baldric. All five band drum majors, as well as the drum majors of the corps of drums and pipes and drums, wear round jockey caps in the full state dress and bearskins in the service state dress with the hackles of their units. These drum majors thus do not salute during state ceremonies, but during state arrival ceremonies and international sports competitions and events held in the London area they salute during the playing of the national anthems.

In cavalry bands, the position is that of a Band Corporal Major, who leads the band when dismounted. However, he wears his regiment's full dress. This is true for the Band of the Household Cavalry, whose BCM wears the uniform of his reporting regiment.

The ceremonial leader of a band and bugles is known as a Bugle Major, who unlike other military drum majors, utilizes a shorter mace that is carried at the side of the torso. The Bugle Major wears, as part of the full dress uniform, a shako as headdress with the hackle of his unit (the flat cap for the bugle major of the Band of the Brigade of Gurkhas). A similar uniform is worn by the drum major of the Band of the Royal Irish Regiment, but he wears the caubeen instead, previously the headdress of drum majors of the Irish infantry and still worn by cavalry and artillery formations, formerly worn by the drum majors in these units.

=== Drum beat rolls to commence playing ===
The beating of the drumline to commence the playing of marches has been a uniquely British tradition since the Middle Ages and became a formal part in the mid-19th century, done by all the bands and field formations under the Armed Forces. Two triple-pace drum rolls are the standard in all the bands save the Household Division (dismounted Band of the Household Cavalry and the Foot Guards) which use a unique five-beat pace drum roll, the custom used by the Band of the Royal Armoured Corps while parading with the heavy cavalry (and formerly in use within the bands of these regiments). A unique seven-pace drum roll is used by the Royal Artillery Band and all RAF bands.

=== Timpanists/Kettledrummers and fanfare trumpeters of the Band of the Household Cavalry and formerly of all mounted bands ===
The tradition of timpanists or kettledrummers and occasionally fanfare trumpeters leading their unit mounted bands on parade is a tradition that traces its origins to the timpanists and natural (later chromatic) fanfare trumpeters of the English armies of the medieval era and into the era of the Renaissance, wherein these musicians sounding trumpet calls and long rolls on the timpani while mounted provided the background for the charging ranks of English and later Scottish cavalrymen on the battlefield. During the Restoration, the Household Cavalry under King Charles II sported these instruments on parade, training, and actual battles, as well as on ceremonial and public duties and other royal events. This was a practice that would be later adopted by the then Dragoon and Horse regiments by the time a unified British Army came into being in 1707.

By the late 18th century, these kettledrummers and trumpeters were now joined by a number of musicians, at least in the then twin regiments of Life Guards and the Royal Horse Guards, forming the basis of their mounted bands, which would be a trend later in the 19th, when all the line cavalry regiments of the Army (Dragoon Guards, Dragoons, Hussars and Lancers), all had mounted bands of brass and woodwind instrumentalists, a percussion section when dismounted and the timpanist and trumpeters when mounted, all under bandmasters and later Directors of Music (in the Household Cavalry). In these bands, the drum horse timpanist carrying and playing his instrument, which carries the battle honours of his unit at the head of his bandsmen, is the equivalent to the drum major of the infantry and other dismounted bands, corps of drums and pipes and drums. When massed on parades, these bandsmen were fronted by the leading timpanists and the trumpeters, under the baton of a senior conductor. The practice ended practically in the late 1930s as these bands became dismounted to adapt to the mechanization of the Army's cavalry regiments, however, the practice has been retained to this very day in the Band of the Household Cavalry, which maintains the two timpanists at the head of the band when in mounted formation. This also had been the case for the yeomanry regiments of what is now today the Army Reserve, many of them Yeomanry Cavalry, which were also dismounted in the same time as their regular counterparts.

In the same way, the mounted fanfare trumpeters sounding trumpet calls for cavalry units on battle and parade were commonplace in the 18th and 19th centuries and into the early decades of the 20th, when they become practically dismounted as the fanfare sections of their bands, a tradition maintained today in both the Band of the Household Cavalry and the Band of the Royal Armoured Corps. The appointment of a Trumpet Major, maintained solely today in the Household Cavalry and was formerly present in all the cavalry regiments (save for the Royal Tank Regiment), is bestowed to a senior ranked NCO whose job is, then as in now, to lead the fanfare trumpeters of his unit, historically in battle and today in ceremonies and parades, give musical instruction to his fellow trumpeters and to impact discipline to them, the band and to the whole of the unit. In 1831, the then 1st Life Guards was granted a set of Russian-produced chromatic fanfare trumpets, which made their debut in Trooping the Colour that year. Then as in today these trumpeters carry in the tabards of their instruments the arms and insignia of their formations, while those of the Household Cavalry carry the royal coat of arms.

From 1884 to 1984, the Royal Artillery Mounted Band was the sole band representing the mounted gunners of the Royal Horse Artillery, wearing the mounted variant of the full dress uniforms worn by the Royal Artillery. This band itself was the successor to both the 1797 Royal Horse Artillery Band and the 1857 Royal Artillery Brass Band, which actually began as the corps of drums of the whole of the RA until 1856, when its bandmaster and fife major, James Henry Lawson, transitioned into a bugle major and converted it as the first ever bugle band in the United Kingdom, with drummers and buglers when dismounted and timpani and buglers in mounted formation. Said band, with the addition of brass instruments in the 1860s, became a pioneer mounted brass ensemble within the army proper, and its personnel would form part of the basis of the RAMB in 1884. Until the late 1930s, the RAMB, in mounted formation, played in like manner as in the Army's guards and line cavalry bands. Currently, the King's Troop Royal Horse Artillery, aside from a bugler, maintains a natural chromatic fanfare trumpet section active in ceremonial events and the Musical Ride demonstration, a tradition formerly part of the RAMB in the years when it played in mounted formation.

Then as in today both the timpanist and the fanfare trumpeters, in full dress uniform, wear the colours of their respective units. In the Household Division, the Band of the Household Cavalry wear the mounted variants of the 1665 State Dress in all royal events. Only the Royal Scots Dragoon Guards timpanist in full dress wears a bearskin while playing his instrument in mounted formation.

=== Regimental/service marches ===
All military units have officially sanctioned unit marches. Service units with official marches include the Royal Air Force Regiment ("Holyrood"), the Royal Corps of Signals ("Begone Dull Care"), and the Royal Marine Commandos ("Sarie Marais"). There are 2 specific marches maintained in army regiments: one in quick time and one in slow time. The difference is found in that the former is performed during regular marchpast while the latter is performed during particularly ceremonial marches. In rifle regiments and mounted units, there is also such a march as a double past, performed when in double time and/or are riding at an increasing speed. One of the more notable double pasts is The Keel Row. The RN and the RAF are the only services to have service-wide marches, with the army being represented by a pan-regiment march indicative to the branch (e.g. On the Green, Soldiers of the Queen).

== Influence ==
=== In military bands around the world ===
==== United States ====
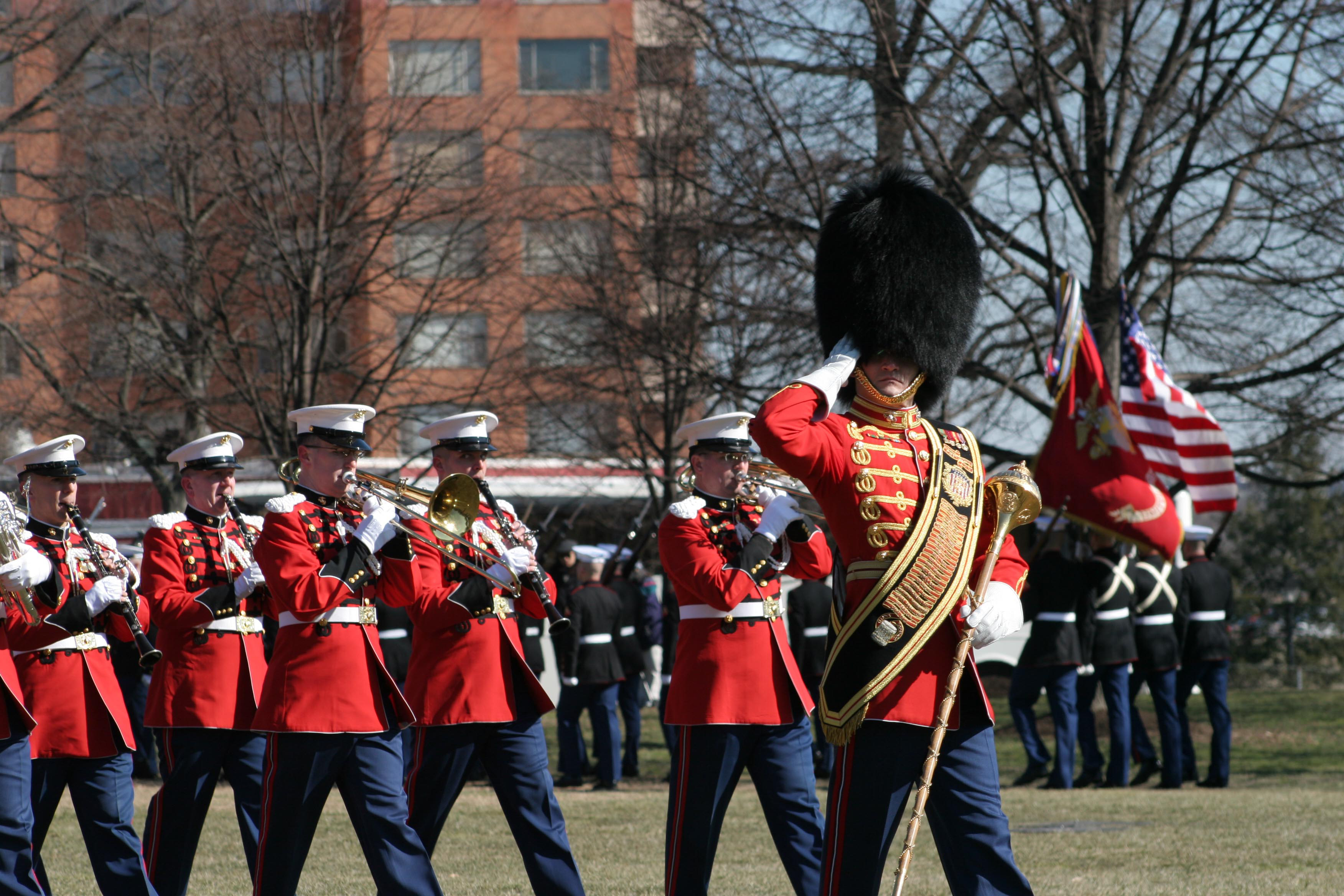
The Drum Major of the Marine Band leading it during a ceremony while wearing a bearskin.

American military bands are one of the chief users of British military music tradition. The name of the United States Marine Band uses terminology that stems from the British use of designating various military units as either the "King's Own" or "Queen's Own". Premier ensembles like the Marine Band as well as the United States Army Band and the United States Air Force Band have drum majors who wear bearskins similar to the Foot Guards and are issued a set of regalia; the latter typically being a service wide tradition unlike the former. It maintains several military pipe bands. Until the 1930s, individual unit drum and bugle corps, as well as corps of drums (all termed as field music in the United States) were in active service in the US Armed Forces, with the tradition being adopted by civil ensembles.

==== Canada ====
All Canadian military bands follow the same precedent set by the British, as well as number of pipe bands (and formerly corps of drums and drum and bugle corps, the latter with additional influences later on from the United States). At the same time, due to its shared history with France (particularly in Quebec), a French aspect to Canadian military bands can also be found. With the 1968 unification of the Canadian Armed Forces, many military bands were reorganized to fit the American format, with the creation of base bands, which follow the traditions of the United States, the UK and France in respect to military music.

==== African military bands ====
African military bands grew out of the Decolonisation of Africa in the 1960s. British influence in these Bands can be found in East and West Africa. Military bands under Ugandan President Idi Amin grew under with his particular approval. During his rule, he ordered the creation of a military band in every major military barracks across the country. The country that follows British band patterns the most are those of the South African National Defence Force, which utilizes the voluntary regimental system alongside the active duty structure. The South African Army Corps of Bandsmen is the South African equivalent of the Corps of Army Music. African military bands more or less coem in the form of brass and reed bands, with few pipe bands being the exceptions. Outside South Africa, whose military has had pipe bands that were strongly associated with the Apartheid regime, countries such as Nigeria and Egypt have made British-style military pipe bands. In the former country, both the Guards Brigade and the Nigerian Air Force own dedicated pipe bands, with the NAF creating its first pipe band as recently as April 2019. The Kenya Army Band and other Kenyan military bands wear a distinctive white and black monkey bearskin based on the pattern set by the Royal Scots Dragoon Guards.

==== Asian military bands ====
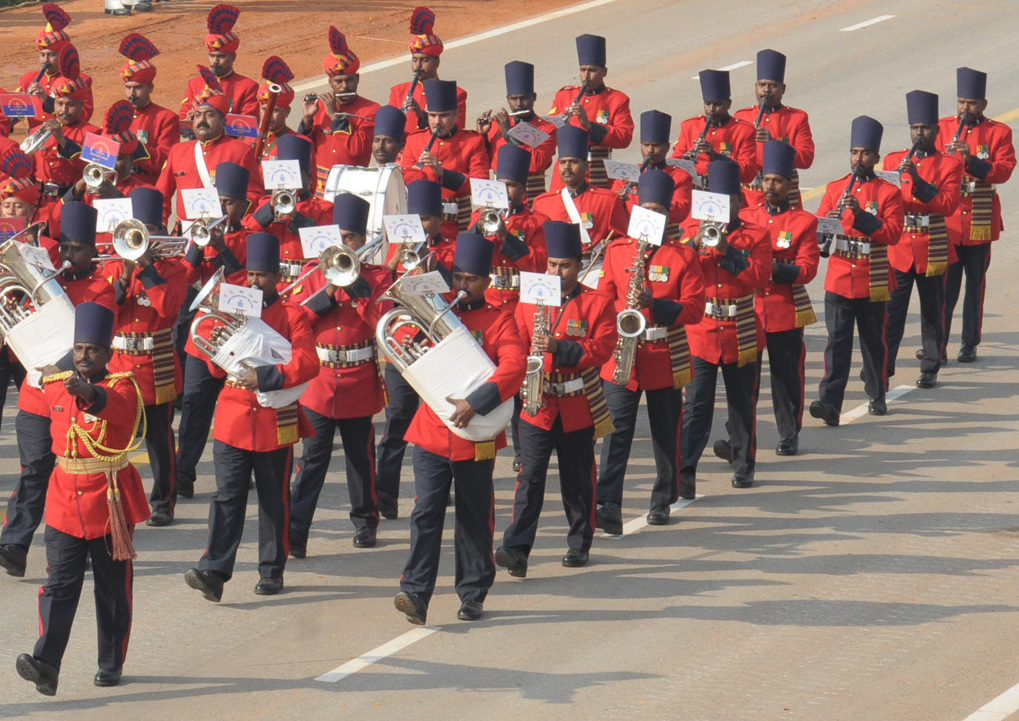
The Madras Sappers Military Band during the Delhi Republic Day parade of 2012.

Countries such as India, Pakistan and Malaysia have followed the British precedent very closely. Indian military bands, which are organized in British-style regimental and unit formations, are the largest of their kind in the world, with the Indian Armed Forces today having more than 50 military brass bands and 400 pipe bands. Other regions, particularly the Middle East, also have engaged in the use of the British format. Like India, Arab nations such as Jordan, Qatar, and Kuwait have modified the use of pipe bands to fit traditional Arab culture. In India, pipe bands were introduced to ethnically Sikh, Rajput, Gorkha, and Pathan regiments in the late 19th century, as well as in a number of regiments of other races. Pipe bands are also maintained in Asian countries like neighboring Sri Lanka and Pakistan. The drum major for the Central Military Band of the People's Liberation Army of China has also been modified in recent years to utilize British drum major standards and attributes.

Malaysian, Bruneian and Singaporean bands follow the precedent of the RN and the British Army line infantry. While Myanmar has not been a member of the Commonwealth since independence, the bands of the Tatmadaw also follow the RN order for its bands.

==== Caribbean military bands ====
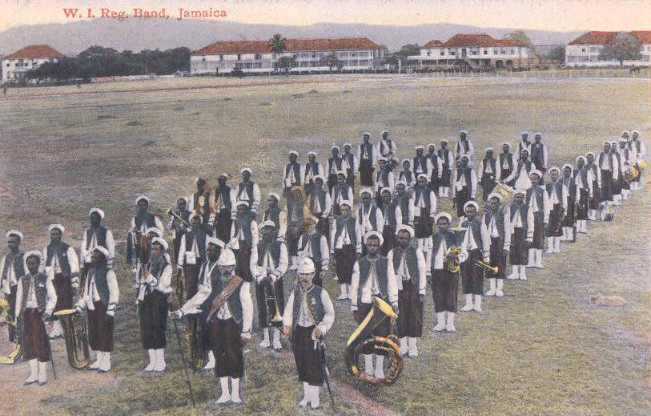
The Band of the West India Regiments, seen here in Jamaica in 1907.

Many Caribbean military bands from countries belonging to the Commonwealth of Nations are modelled after their British counterparts. Many of these bands descend from the West India Regiments. The Jamaica Military Band and the Barbados Defence Force Band are two examples of bands with this type of lineage. The latter is commonly known as the Zouave Band due to the history both the bands and their colonial predecessors in implementing Zouave uniforms by orders of Queen Victoria. The Trinidad and Tobago Defence Force Steel Orchestra has modified its British tradition with its sole use of steelpans.

=== In civilian marching bands in Britain and abroad ===
Traditional British military bands are the basis for many civilian marching bands in the UK and abroad.

- Since the late 1960s, the Bethlehem, Pennsylvania-based Liberty High School Grenadier Band uses a musical formation patterned after the Foot Guards bands of the Household Division (but adapted to suit high school marching bands in the United States), with a pipe band modeled after the Pipes and Drums of the Scots Guards, and its bandsmen wearing uniforms similar to those of the Coldstream Guards (including bearskins). Raised in 1926, this band has been present in a number of local, national and international engagements.
- The Neuss-based Quirinus Band and Bugle Corps, formed in 2011, is affiliated to the Band and Bugles of The Rifles and its marching pace mirrors that used by the band. Under its current Bandmaster, Peter Hosking, a veteran former musician of the bands of the Royal Green Jackets and affiliated as well to the Royal Green Jackets Association, it wears the uniforms used by the RGJ, which served in West Germany during the Cold War, and its predecessor units, with the red plume over the dark green shako. Being the first German military marching band of its kind, it also honors the German first generation riflemen of the final decades of the 18th and the first decades of the 19th century who served with their English, Scottish and Irish servicemen in the ranks of both the King's Royal Rifle Corps and the Rifle Brigade (The Prince Consort's Own).
- The London Military Band is a civilian military-styled band composed of professional musicians dressed in uniforms based on those worn by the Bands of the Household Division (especially of the Foot Guards) in the Victorian era. Their uniform reflects that of the Band of the Grenadier Guards in the final decades of the 19th century, with the single gold buttons and gold trim.
- The British Imperial Military Band is a concert/marching band composed of ex-military Musicians from all three branches.
- The Central Band of the Royal British Legion is a concert band associated with the Royal British Legion.

== See also ==
- Italian Carabinieri Bands - under the Carabinieri
- Italian Bersaglieri Bands - under the Bersaglieri
- Russian military bands
- Musical Unit of the Spanish Royal Guard
- French Republican Guard Band
- Police band (music)
