= Fanfare orchestra =

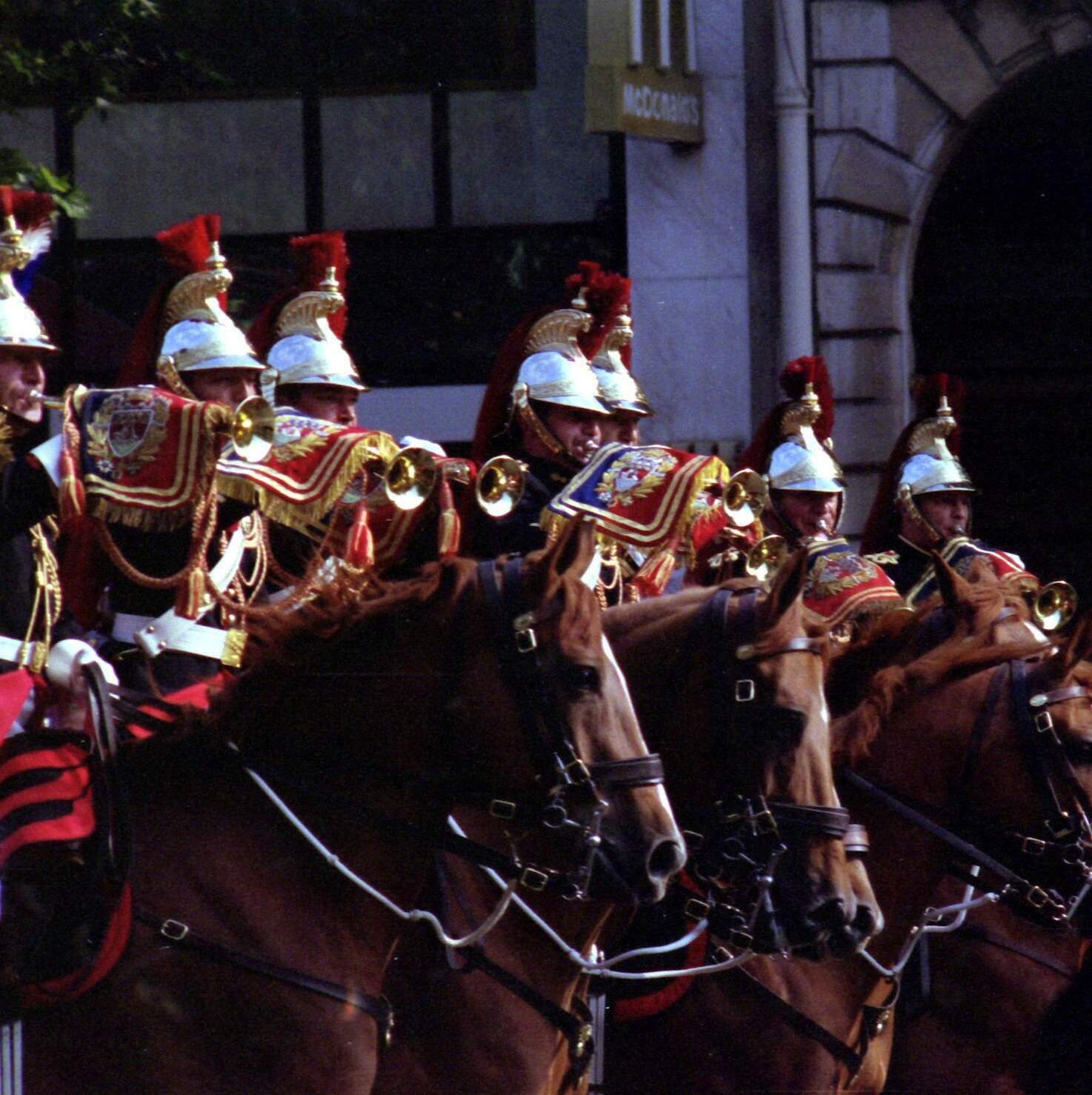
The Mounted Fanfare Band of the French Republican Guard.

A fanfare orchestra (Dutch fanfareorkest, French harmonie-fanfare) is a type of brass band consisting of the entire saxophone family, trumpets, trombones, euphoniums, baritone horns, flugelhorns and alto/tenor- or F-horns, as well as percussion. They are seldom seen outside of Europe, with a high concentration of these bands in Belgium and the Netherlands, many of them civil bands with a few Dutch bands also serving the Armed forces of the Netherlands and its veterans.

Bands sporting similar instruments are also active in France, Luxembourg and in Germany, many of these German bands sporting fanfare band titles as several of them started up as these. Switzerland, Portugal, Lithuania and Norway have few such civil bands.

== Introduction ==
Starting in the 19th century, the adoption of the British brass band tradition in several countries in Europe as well as the enduring tradition of military bands made their way into the formation of the fanfare orchestra in the Low Countries. It is a type of brass band but with saxophones added, while also sporting extra brass instruments.

The civil fanfare orchestra exists not just to provide entertainment through music but also for the preservation of local musical traditions. As such the orchestra plays not just in concerts but also in civil events and celebrations.

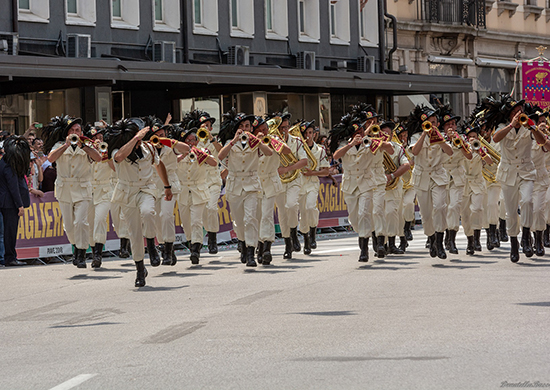
Bersaglieri Fanfare

Fanfare orchestras affiliated to the Dutch military also perform in events involving the armed services and military veterans in the Netherlands. The Fanfare Band of the Royal Netherlands Army Mounted Regiments "Bereden Wapens" (Dutch: Fanfarekorps Koninklijke Landmacht "Bereden Wapens", FKKLBW) is the only professional fanfare orchestra in the world.

The German variant band, though, would or would not use saxophones depending on necessity. Few bands use drum and bugle corps instruments alongside the standard brass instruments. In the Italian Army is famous the Fanfare of the Bersaglieri with its characteristic running pace, which only plays brass.

== Instrumentation ==
The instrumentation of a fanfare orchestra is fairly similar to that of a British brass band but also includes trumpets rather than cornets and an additional complement of flugelhorns and saxophones. This combination of instruments gives the fanfare orchestra a sound that can be viewed as a halfway between that of a concert band and a brass band.

In a fanfare orchestra, the most numerous brass instrument is the flugelhorn. In these ensembles, flugelhorns act as cornets would in a British-style brass band. Flugelhorn parts in a fanfare orchestra are often far more demanding than flugelhorn parts in brass band, and due to the absence of cornets, flugelhorns have to play in a higher register than they would in a brass band. The saxophone parts are often doubled on flugelhorn parts, which is what gives the fanfare orchestra its characteristic dark sound, as opposed to the brighter sound of wind bands. Trumpets are the other instruments that provide the higher range in fanfare bands. Trumpets generally do not play as much of a role in the sound of the band as they would in other ensembles, such as wind bands. Cornets are also occasionally used, but this is rare. At the very top of the range there is usually a soprano cornet or a piccolo trumpet.

In the middle and lower ranges of the fanfare orchestra are French horns and occasionally tenor horns. Mellophones can also be used, but this is rare. Lower than the French horns are baritone horns and euphoniums, trombones, occasionally a bass trombone, and B flat and E flat tubas plus sousaphones and helicons. However, in the last couple of decades, the use of actual (British-style) baritone horns has been in severe decline, and the baritone parts are very frequently played on euphonium instead. This does not change the fact that the intended instrument to play the baritone parts is, still, a baritone horn. The instrumentation of a fanfare orchestra is virtually identical to that of a brass band, aside from the fact that there are saxophones in the fanfare band, namely baritone saxophones, alto saxophones, soprano saxophones and tenor saxophones as well (few bands even have a rare use of the bass saxophone). There is often an abundance of percussion players (from 4-6), using snare drums, bass drums, cymbals and glockenspiels (plus the optional tenor drum, including in German ensembles).

== See also ==
- Marching band
- Brass band
