= La Marcia dei Bersaglieri =

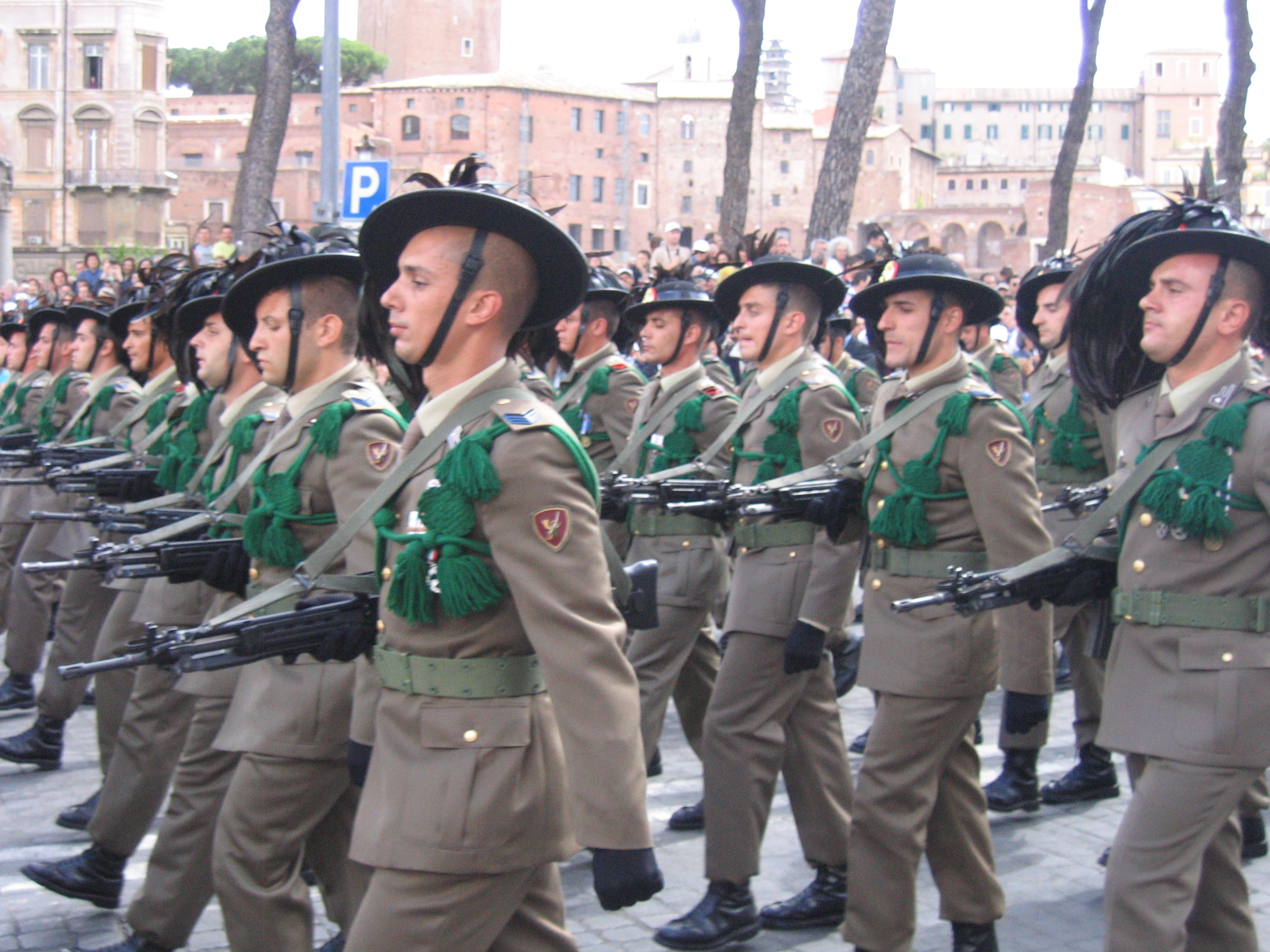
Bersaglieri on parade.

La Marcia dei Bersaglieri or March of the Bersaglieri in English, is the official hymn of the Bersaglieri Corps, an elite unit of the Italian Army. It was composed in 1860, just 25 years after the creation of the corps, by army officer Giulio Ricordi, with words to the composition being written by poet Giuseppe Regaldi. 2 years later, Peter Ludwig Hertel made a version of the march for Paolo Taglioni's ballet Flik Flok, which later arranged by Raffaele Cuconato took the form known and played todayToday, the march is the flagship of the corps's tradition as it is played by the various Italian Bersaglieri Bands that exist.

== Lyrics ==
Italian Text Quando passano per la via gli animosi Bersaglieri, sento affetto e simpatia pei gagliardi militari. Vanno rapidi e leggeri quando sfilano in drappello, quando il vento sul cappello fa le piume svolazzar. L'Italia in mezzo secolo copertasi di gloria fu addotta alla vittoria dal prode Bersaglier. Lo stuolo di La Marmora sui campi di Crimea, la foce Eridanea ritolse allo stranier. Splende al sol d'Italia del Bersagliere la carabina, dalle giogaie alla marina è chiuso il varco all'invasor. Dove gemono i dolori primo accorre il Bersagliere, che dà al misero i tesori di bontade e di fortezza. Marcia a capo delle schiere ordinate per l'assalto, non discende dallo spalto finché il fuoco cesserà. Caduto in riva all'Adige, risorto a Solferino, pugnando a San Martino, l'ingiuria vendicò. L'Italia, come il fulmine, percorse vincitore, spiegando il tricolore univa il Tebro al Po. Splende al sol d'Italia del Bersagliere la carabina, dalle giogaie alla marina è chiuso il varco all'invasor.	English Translation When the audacious Bersagliers pass on the road, I feel affection and sympathy for these military alerts. They go fast and light when they parade, When the wind on the hat flutters the feathers. Italy in half a century is covered with glory She owes her victory to valiant Bersaglier. The troupe of La Marmora on the Crimean fields, The Eridanean mouth resumed abroad. Shine in the Italian sun of Bersaglier the rifle, From the mountains to the sea closes the passage to the invader. From the first moaning runs the Bersaglier, Give the unfortunate man treasures of goodness and strength. March at the head of the regiments ready to the assault, Do not leave the front until the fire stops. Fell on the banks of the Adige, resurfaced in Solferino, Fighter in San Martino, the injury he avenged. Italy, like lightning, he travels winner, Deploying the flag uniting the Tiber to the Po. Shine in the Italian sun of Bersaglier the rifle, From the mountains to the sea closes the passage to the invader.
