= Christopher McCafferty =

Northern Ireland music promoter and DJ

Christopher McCafferty has variously been a disc jockey, nightclub promoter, lighting engineer, video artist nightlife impresario and promoter of underground music.

McCafferty started his DJ career in Belfast in the late 1970s. The UK style magazine i-D cites McCafferty with being the nucleus of Belfast nightlife playing underground gothic inspired music. For almost four decades McCafferty promoted underground music in Belfast and all major European capitals earning a place for his club 'Victory Over The Sun' in the FHM list of the "most original nights out on the planet".

== 1980s ==
In 1983 The Irish News newspaper reported on the beginning of Belfast's underground scene: "for the past two years Christopher McCafferty has provided safe haven for the cities fashionistas, the Underground seems set to address the entertainment malaise that has held back Belfast's night time economy."

In 1987 McCafferty pioneered the combination of performance art and large scale video projections of real time action, with dance music. Dublin's dSide magazine covered many of these events, journalist Deirdre Cartmill recalled in her extensive retrospective on Underground clubs "Chris McCafferty was organising huge Underground dance events in weird locations bringing the dance party to a new level of intensity".

== 1990s ==
Even during Belfast's civil strife "The Troubles" McCafferty's Underground clubs continued to function, particularly the club "Deep Blue". The Sunday Press addressed this issue describing "the position of the Underground in relation to Belfast's development in the early 1990s, during that last spate of troubles in the North, Belfast was described as a ghost town where few would dare to venture out to socialise. This is simply not the case in the 'neutral territory' frequented by affluent young things - Catholic and Protestant in the buzzing south of the city. The trendiest of this breed are avid followers of the Deep Blue association of artists, musicians, DJ's and video technicians, who run wonderfully weird nights at secret venues all over the city."

The profile of McCafferty's Clubs began to increase in the 90's particularly within newspapers, music and style magazines.

When electronic dance music entered the mainstream in the late 1990s McCafferty banned dancing in his clubs in order to maintain underground credibility. McCafferty moved his club concepts into venues never before used for clubs, such as crematoria, museums, churches and abattoirs. McCafferty now played a more sophisticated music based on New Jazz, Epic and Music concrete. This new concept allowed the DJ's to expand their repertoires into more contemporary Avant-Garde music.
