= Belfast International Tattoo =

Annual series of military tattoos

The Belfast International Tattoo, also referred to as the Belfast Tattoo, is an annual series of military tattoos performed by international performers and military bands including various styles of dancing, in the Odyssey Arena in Belfast, Northern Ireland. The event is held typically in September and showcases the traditions of Ulster-Scots and global pageantry.

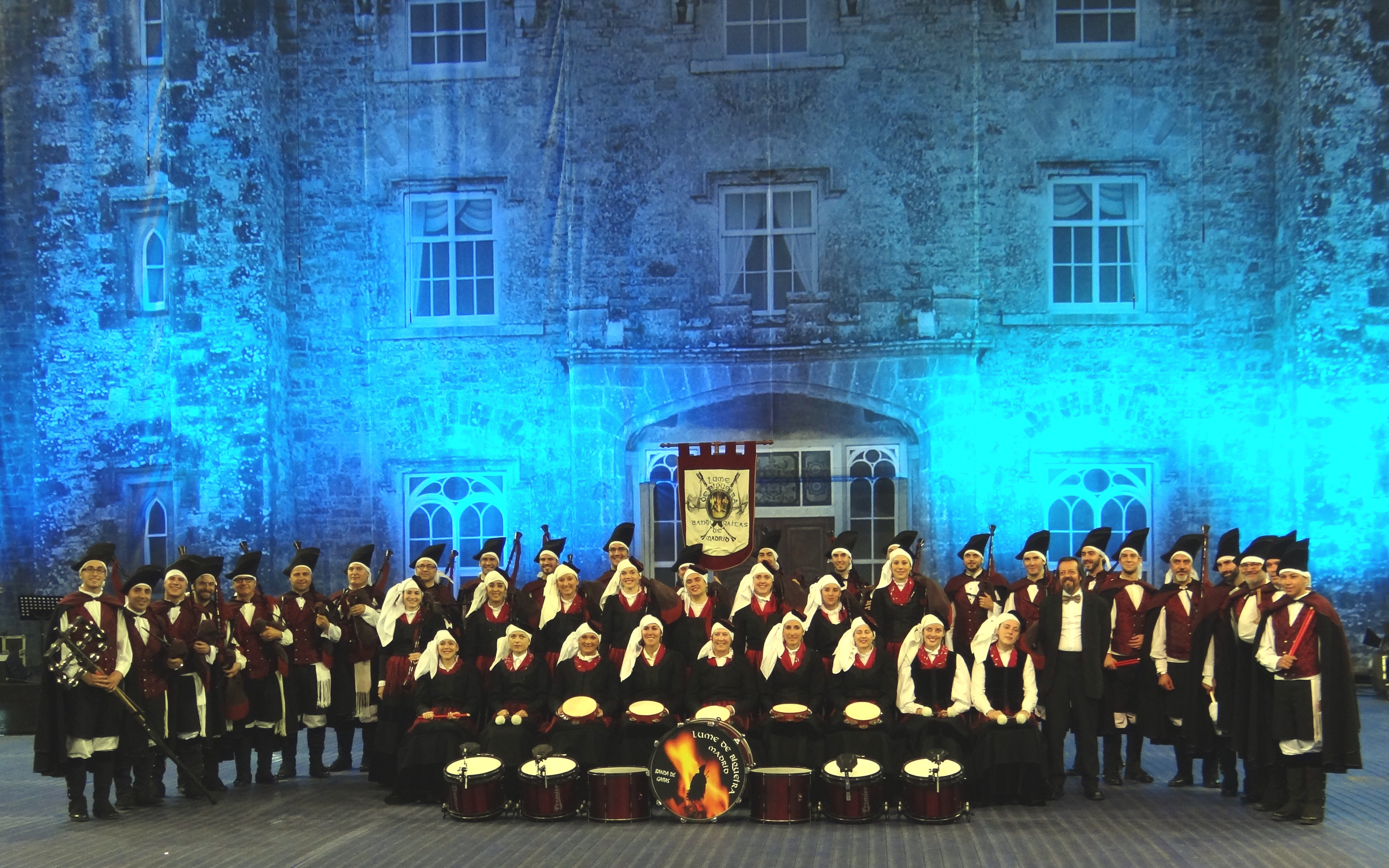
Lume de Biqueira Pipe Band pictured at the Belfast Tattoo

Various bands and dance performance groups from around the world have participated, countries include Finland, Canada, Zimbabwe, Norway, America, Spain, Netherlands and Australia. Performers from Northern Ireland are also featured in the Belfast Tattoo, including the Band of the Royal Irish Regiment, County Armagh Accordion Band, Ballylone Concert Flute Band, Hunter Moore Memorial Flute Band and Kathryn Stewart's Highland Dance Display Team.

Other appearances include the Chelsea Pensioners, the Royal British Legion, Mary Peters and the Julianna Unicyclists.

== Venue and production ==
The Belfast International Tattoo differs from other military tattoos as it is an indoor event. It is consistently held at the Odyssey Arena. From 2021 onwards, the Belfast Tattoo was held over multiple nights due to growing popularity. A mock-Edinburgh Castle is projected on the entrance, paying homage to the Royal Edinburgh Military Tattoo. An interlude is called half-way through the tattoo for visitors a restroom break and to go to the concession stands, and for the performers to prepare for the second part of the tattoo.

The Tattoo has been attracting over 13,000 attendees each year, with more viewers tuning in through their social media channels.

BBC personality and broadcaster Helen Mark presents the Belfast Tattoo, giving information on each band and performer. She is an advocate for Ulster Scots heritage.

The Belfast International Tattoo is run by a board of directors. These members include Treasurer Brian Wilson MBE and Director Vikki Singer.

The final ceremony, known as the Grand Finale, sees all the performers and bands come onto the stage and perform in unison.

== History ==
=== Background ===
Military displays and tattoos have took place in Northern Ireland at venues like Balmoral Showgrounds or in connection with major military bases and regiments based in Ulster. These events served to showcase the discipline, music, and traditions of the British Armed Forces and often included pipe bands.

Bands from Ulster that have performed at military tattoos include the Band of the Royal Irish Regiment. The regiment held their own tattoo, on 25 June 1999. It was known as the Royal Irish Regiment Military Tattoo, and took place at St Patrick's Barracks, Ballymena.

The Royal Irish Rangers sent their band to perform at the 1979 Royal Edinburgh Military Tattoo. They also performed at the Colchester Military Tattoo.

=== Belfast International Tattoo ===
The founder of the Belfast International Tattoo was Colin Wasson. Wasson lead the planning of the first Belfast Tattoo event. The first Belfast Tattoo took place in September 2013. In attendance were Unionist and Nationalist politicians.

In 2016, Colin Wasson stepped down after 5 years, passing leadership to Brian Wilson. Wasson stated “He [Brian Wilson] is more than ready for this challenge, so I know its leadership is being passed into good, experienced hands.”

In 2018, a record-setting turn-out had been set at the sixth-annual Belfast Tattoo. The night had a focus on a more diverse set of performers. The international roster of performers has included the Royal Canadian Mounted Police Pipes and Drums, the Band of the Irish Guards, and Switzerland's famous Lucerne Band.

In 2020, the Belfast International Tattoo was forced to postpone its events scheduled for 2020. The Belfast Tattoo resumed in 2021.

== Notable participants ==
- Chelsea Pensioners (United Kingdom)
- St John's College Pipes and Drums Band, (Zimbabwe)
- Conscript Band of the Finnish Defence Forces (Finland)
- Royal Military Band "Johan Willem Friso" (Netherlands)
- Musique de l'Artillerie (France)
- United States Coast Guard Pipe Band (United States of America)
- Tveit Union Musikkorps (Norway)
- Band of the Royal Irish Regiment (United Kingdom)
- Royal British Legion (United Kingdom)
- Mary Peters - as a special guest with the Mary Peters Trust

== Awards ==
- 2018: Northern Ireland Tourism Awards, Most Promising Authentic NI Event
- 2018: Business Eye First Trust Bank Small Business Awards, Hospitality & Tourism Business of the Year
