= Audiences NI =

Thrive (formerly Audiences NI) is an audience development agency established in August 2004 by the Arts Council of Northern Ireland to grow and diversify audiences for the arts in Northern Ireland.
