= The Black North =

The Black North is an expression sometimes used to describe Northern Ireland. Typically it refers to the majority presence of Protestants (whose main denominations include Church of Ireland, Presbyterian Church of Ireland and Methodist Church in Ireland) in some of the six counties that comprise Northern Ireland. Early references that include this expression include an article by Belfast socialist William Walker in response to a piece by James Connolly (Walker, 1911). The origin of the term is obscure. It may be related to the Royal Black Institution. The phrase is sometimes used in a pejorative way when referring to people from Northern Ireland, though literally it carries with it mildly mocking, or (when used by Northerners to describe themselves), perhaps ironic connotations.

In the North American context, the phrase has also been used to describe the situation of African Americans in the northern states of the US, arising from an article written by W. E. B. Du Bois entitled "The Black North: A Social Study."
