= Band of the Royal Irish Regiment =

- Active: 1993 to Present
- Country: United Kingdom
- Branch: British Army
- Type: Military band
- Role: Public duties
- Size: 32
- Part of: Royal Irish Regiment (1992)
- Headquarters: RHQ—Kinnegar Army Barracks, County Down, Holywood
- Battle honours: Operation Desert Storm

Commanders
- Bandmaster: WO1 Richard Douglas

The Band of the Royal Irish Regiment is a military band and the regimental band of the Royal Irish Regiment and the chief Irish military reserve band in the British Army. Being a reserve band, it is composed of volunteer musicians with the exception of a permanent staff instructor.

== History ==
=== Previous Irish military bands in the British Army ===
==== Ranger band ====
The Royal Irish Rangers band was established in 1968. It took part in the Edinburgh Military Tattoo in 1979. On 12 January 1991, all 19 members of the band, led by Bandmaster WO1 Clarke, were deployed to a transit camp in Saudi Arabia, where they joined a unit of the Royal Marines in Operation Desert Storm. On 19 January. the band undertook a twelve-hour move towards the border with Iraq to reinforce the 32 Field Hospital, a unit consisting of 600 military personnel of the British Armed Forces. On St Patrick’s Day a parade was led by the band at the hospital.

==== UDR Pipes and Drums ====
Each battalion of the Ulster Defence Regiment had a section of professional bagpipers who were formally part of a pipe band (called the Pipes & Drums of the Ulster Defence Regiment). In June 1986, the regiment held a two-day military tattoo at Ravenhill rugby ground in Belfast. The tattoo attracted 12,000 spectators and featured a Beating Retreat by the Pipes and Drums, the Band of the Duke of Edinburgh's Royal Regiment and the Royal Ulster Constabulary Band. The only musical recording by the UDR ever publicly released was the 5 UDR Pipes & Drums' "Irish & Scottish Pipe Music", which included the regimental and battalion marches as well as other Irish tunes.

=== Today ===
The band of the Royal Irish formed in 1993, a year later after the regiment. It is features a Band, Bugles, Pipes and Drums which were part of the antecedent regiments. As a result, it boasted the largest regimental musical ensemble in the British Army before being reorganized in October 2007. On 28 April 2012, the band led a parade fora UDR memorial unveiled at the National Memorial Arboretum. The band was performed during the golden jubilee for the Royal Irish Rangers in 2018. During the celebrations, the band performed a "beating retreat" in an event hosted by the Lisburn and Castlereagh City Council.

== Uniform ==
Its uniform follows the traditional full dress uniform of Irish regiments and rifle regiments. The pipers' uniform consists of a saffron kilt, a bottle-green "Prince Charlie" jacket, cape and caubeen with a green hackle.

== Regimental marches ==
=== Killaloe (Quick) ===
Killaloe is the regimental quick march of the Royal Irish Regiment. It was originally written by Robert Martin for a musical production called "Miss Esmerelda". There have been various lyrics sang to the song over the years, but in modern times a simple "Yo!" is heard from soldiers towards the end of the song.

=== Eileen Allanagh (slow) ===
Eileen Allanagh is the regimental slow march of the Royal Irish Regiment. It was originally written in 1873 by composer John Rogers Thomas as a ballad.

=== Old Regimental Marches (Quick) ===
The Band of the Royal Irish Regiment also plays the regiment quick marches of the Royal Irish's antecedent regiments. They are:

- Rory O'More (Royal Inniskilling Fusiliers)
- St. Patrick's Day (Royal Irish Fusiliers - also the regimental quick march of the Irish Guards)
- Garryowen (Ulster Defence Regiment, Royal Irish Fusiliers)
- Off, Off, Said the Stranger (Royal Ulster Rifles)
- South Down Militia (Royal Ulster Rifles' Pipes and Drums)

Additionally, both Killaloe and Eileen Allanagh were the regimental marches for antecedent regiments.

== See also ==
- Band of the Irish Guards
- British Army bands
- Royal Irish Regiment (1992)
