= History Hub Ulster =

- Available in: English
- Founded: 2014
- Headquarters: Belfast, {{{location_country}}}
- Area served: Northern Ireland
- Founder: Karen O'Rawe
- Chairperson: Gavin Bamford
- Website: https://historyhubulster.co.uk/

History Hub Ulster (HHU), is a research group, news blog, video creator, archivist, content writer and book publisher based in Northern Ireland. The group was founded by Karen O’Rawe. They engage in the local community on social media and hold outdoor events by hosting interviews and working on various projects. Research topics include Great War, Second World War, Titanic, cemetery history and family history involving the events of the people of Ulster. Various books on these topics have been published by History Hub Ulster. HHU have provided previously missing historical information in Ulster.

Nigel Henderson created the Great War Ulster Newspaper Archive. It is an active project, with contents containing over 16,000 historical photographs and documentation as a database and repository. It is a source for pages such as The Belfast Shipyard, and newspapers, like News Letter and Belfast Telegraph.

History Hub Ulster are active users of the Public Record Office of Northern Ireland. HHU provided documentation and papers for PRONI's Belfast Jewish Heritage Project archive.

== History ==
In July 2014, History Hub Ulster created their first articles, documenting events around Belfast, such as "Candlelight Vigil Belfast".

In 2016, the Karen O'Rawe and the group contributed and supported the complexities behind the Tartan Gangs and Paramilitaries: The Loyalist Backlash by Gareth Mulvenna.

In May 2016, HHU had created a record of information for Ulster WWI Sailors project.

In 2017, the group covered the Ballymena Family History Fair.

Nigel Henderson's created a project known as Belfast Presbyterians in the Great War. His studies were used and he had become a contributor to News Letter.

In 2018 History Hub Ulster contributed to The Obscure Heroes of Liberty - The Belgian People who Aided Escaped Allied Soldiers During the Great War 1914-1918 by Kenneth M. Baker.

From 2018 to 2022, Peter McCabe wrote a number of cemetery history books, Belfast City Cemetery, A Guide to Dundonald Cemetery, and 2020 - 20 graves in each of 20 different local cemetery, and Roselawn 2021 - A Guide to Roselawn Cemetery. McCabe's interest in cemetery history has stinted from his own research, and undertaking in educational tours around cemeteries. McCabe has researched local family history, such as the Kelly Family, of John Kelly Limited.

In 2018, HHU completed the RAF 100 project. This project's aim was to contribute and commemorate the people and events from the Royal Flying Corps then the Royal Airforce in WWI. It was celebrated by the RAF at St. Anne's Cathedral, Belfast to mark 100 years of the RAF.

In 2019, History Hub Ulster participated in the Great War Gaeilgeoirí of East Belfast project, highlighting Irish-speaking soldiers from East Belfast in WWI.

In 2021 and 2022, the HHU have been working with the Mid and East Antrim Borough Council to retrieve and add missing names from Ballymena’s WWII Memorial located in the Memorial Park. It is known as the Ballymena WW2 War Memorial Names Project. After research and successful completion, letter cutters led by Harry Brockway managed to successfully hand cut all 172 of the missing names within six weeks. Work was completed in time for the rededication ceremony at the Memorial Park.

In 2024, Nigel Henderson presented to the Training for Women Network as part of the Heritage Lottery Fund project ‘Remembering Ordinary Women in WWI’.

== Books published ==
- McCabe, Peter, 2020, Belfast, Northern Ireland, History Hub Ulster, 2021
- McCabe, Peter, A Guide to Dundonald Cemetery, Belfast, Northern Ireland, History Hub Ulster, 2020
- McCabe Peter, Belfast City Cemetery, Belfast, Northern Ireland, History Hub Ulster, 2018
- Graham, Richard, Cleaver of Dunraven: A Family History, Northern Ireland, History Hub Ulster, 2017
- Edgar, Richard, Higginson, Clive, Lurgan Heroes - The World War Two Roll of Honour, Northern Ireland, History Hub Ulster, 2020
- McCabe, Peter, Roselawn 2021, Belfast, Northern Ireland, History Hub Ulster, 2022
- Henderson, Nigel Ulster Ulster War Memorials from History Hub Ulster, Northern Ireland, History Hub Ulster, 2018

== Members ==
Name	Notes
Karen O’Rawe	Founder of History Hub Ulster
Gavin Bamford	Chair
Catherine Burrell	Treasurer / Secretary. Genealogical and WWI researcher
Eddie Connolly	publications and communications
Nigel Henderson	Writer
Mark McCrea	
Faye Rice	Castleton Lanterns Great War community project Project Manager and researcher.
Michael Nugent	Associate member
Peter McCabe	Cemetery preservation and research, writer
