= Italian Bersaglieri Bands =

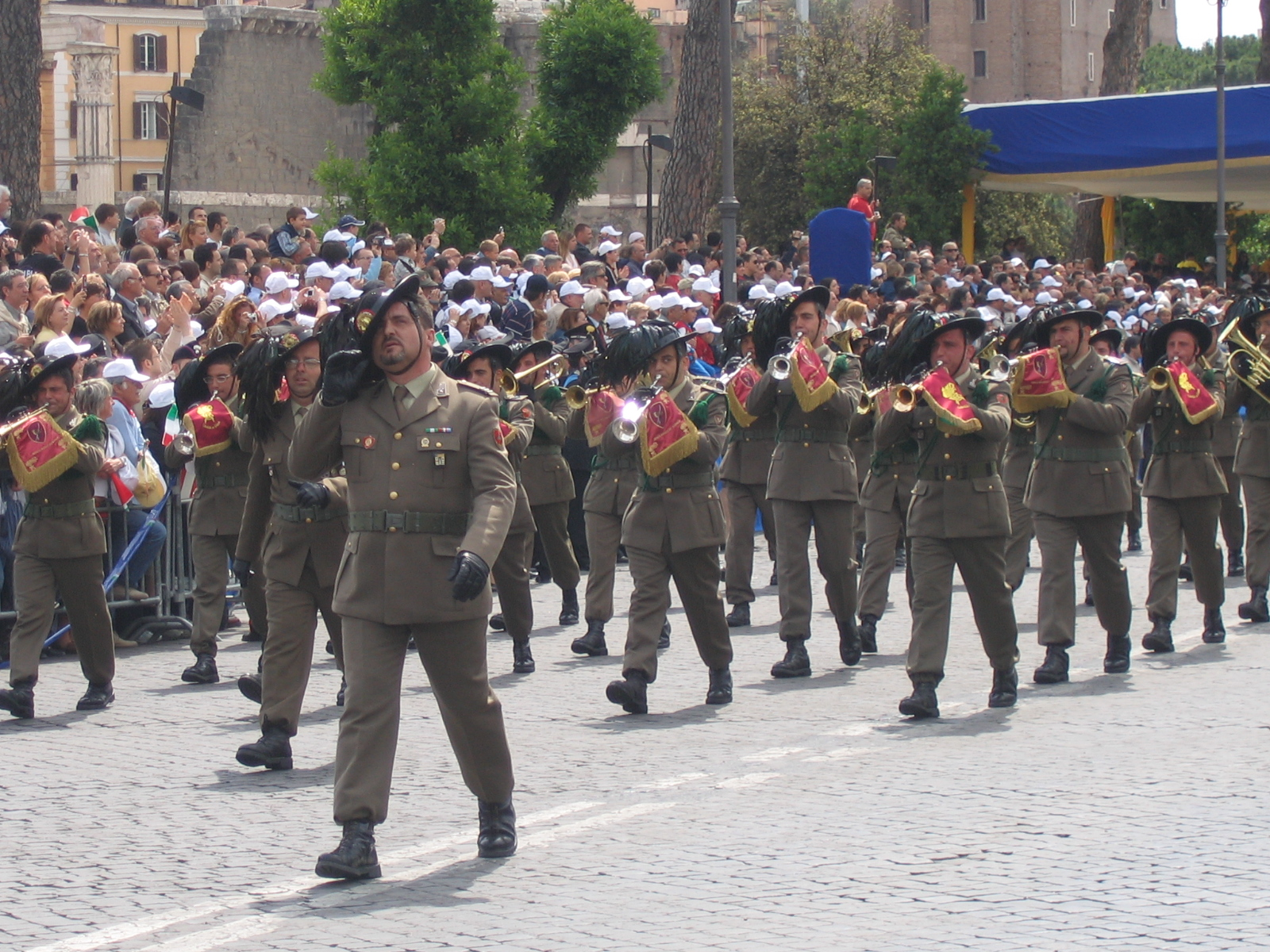
A fanfara on parade in 2006

Italian Bersaglieri Bands (Italian: Fanfara dei Bersaglieri) are military bands that belong to the Bersaglieri corps of the Italian Army. These brass bands are notable for their marching style, playing their instruments while on a jogging pace ahead of their attached units on parade. In the 1800s, every unit in the Bersaglieri had a band known as a fanfara (fanfare)). This is no longer the case today, with only four Bersaglieri regiments retaining a fanfara. A fanfare of the Bersaglieri plays exclusively brass.

These bands are the only ones of their kind in the world. A feature is the common performance of quick and high tempo marches such as La Marcia dei Bersaglieri, the official military march of the Bersaglieri.

== History ==
The first Bersaglieri fanfare band was born on 1 July 1836, when a department left the Ceppi barracks in Turin with wind instruments together with their weapons. The meeting for the musical training of the trumpeters of the various companies gave rise to the battalion fanfare band, which in a few years became an independent unit, while serving the individual companies that also continued to have their own trumpeters. Over time, other wind instruments were added in addition to the trumpets. At this time, the fanfara also began its tradition of marching at a jogging pace. According to popular tradition, the use derives from the entrance in Rome to the breach of Porta Pia in 1870, which was to take place at a charge pace, but which instead spontaneously became a race for the soldiers.

== Instrumentation ==
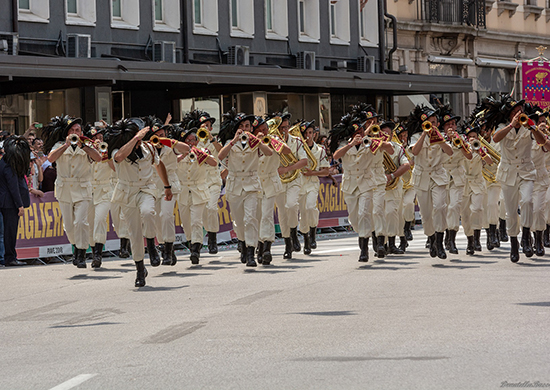
A fanfare at a running pace

The instrumentation of the fanfara includes only brass instruments and does not contain any percussion or woodwind instruments. Valved bugles, which were made more popular by the bands, are the premier instrument used in the bands. The specific bugle that they employ in their performances is known as the Bersag horn, which was created before 1870 by Giuseppe Clemente Pelitti. Today, a modernized three-valved form, similar to the trumpet and the soprano bugle of the US drum and bugle corps, is used by the bands. These horns carry the tabards of their specific regiments. Trombones, French horns, baritone horns, euphoniums and tubas are also used in the bands on a smaller scale.

== Modern day ==
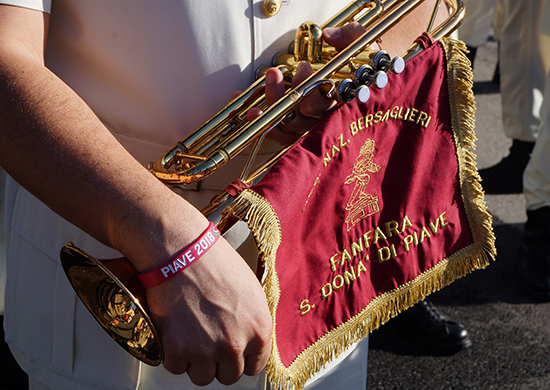

Today, these bands are used during special ceremonies involving the different regiments, as well as the Italian Army as a whole. The bands, with 35 musicians each, are most notable for their appearances at the Festa della Repubblica parade on 2 June, in which they always receive some sort of praise. They have been known to take part in arrival ceremonies for world dignitaries, as well as international military events. The 1953 movie Roman Holiday includes a film scene of a Bersaglieri fanfara as part of a military parade in the early part of the picture.

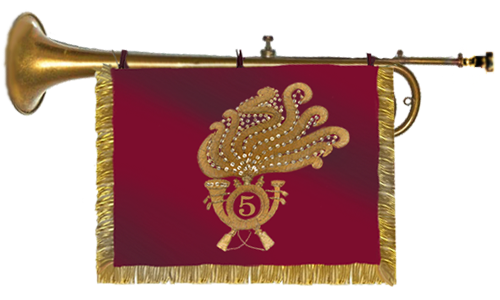
A Bersaglieri bugle of the 5th

== List of Bersaglieri bands ==
- Central Band of the Bersaglieri
  - Band of the 6th Bersaglieri Regiment
  - Band of the 7th Bersaglieri Regiment
  - Band of the 8th Bersaglieri Regiment
  - Band of the 11th Bersaglieri Regiment
- Fanfare Band of the National Bersaglieri Association of Rome
