= Fanfare band =

Musical ensemble

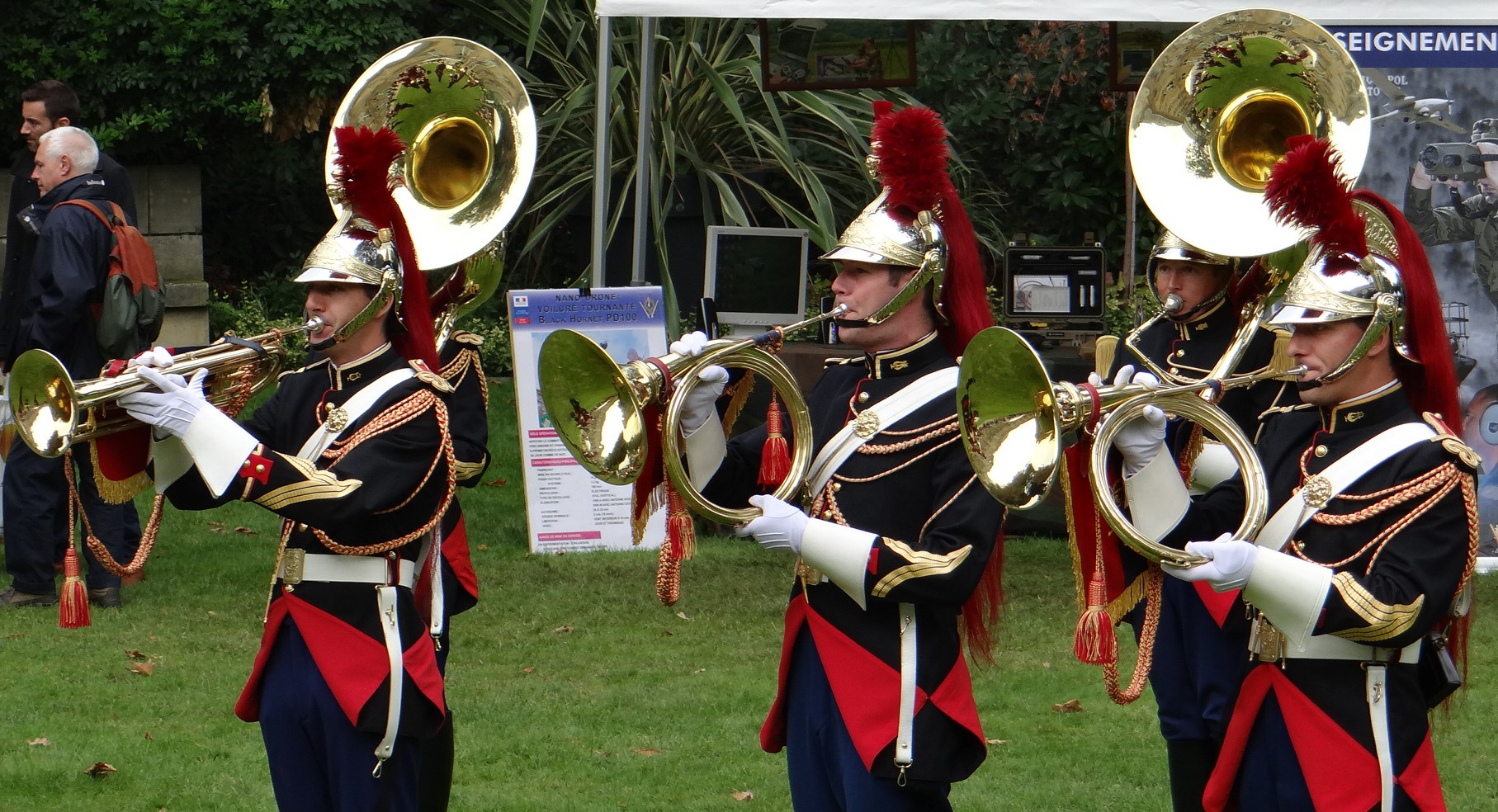
The mounted fanfare band section of the French Republican Guard Band in dismounted formation during a concert.

A fanfare band, fanfare corps, fanfare battery, fanfare team, horn and drum corps, bugle band, drum and bugle corps, or trumpet and drum band (including the German Fanfarenzug, Fanfarenkorps and Regimentsbläserkorps, the Dutch drumband, tamboerkorps, trompetterkorps, halvemaanblazerskorps, klaroenblazerskorps and jachthoornkorps, the Turkish boru trampet takimi, the French batterie-fanfare and fanfare de cavalerie, the Spanish Banda de guerra/banda marcial/banda marcial tradicional/banda ritimica/banda de guerra de trompetas/clarines, the Portuguese fanfarra and banda fanfarra/banda fanfarra simples and the Italian tamburini e trombettieri and batteria di tamburi) is a military or civilian musical ensemble composed of percussion instruments, bugles, natural horns and natural trumpets (and sometimes even brass instruments). Fanfare bands are the descendants of the old medieval trumpet and drum teams that sounded fanfares on important occasions and are related to drum and bugle corps internationally.

== Introduction and history ==
Fanfare bands are a unique type of marching and military band that plays for entertainment, public occasions and gatherings as well as competing in various competitions. They evolved from the medieval ensembles of natural trumpets and drums, and in the ensembles of trumpets and timpani which were formerly common in the mounted bands of cavalry and later artillery regiments.

Beginning in the late Middle Ages, trumpets and drums (usually snares and tenors) would sound fanfares to make important holidays or ceremonial events. These instruments would also serve as timekeepers in various towns, and announce various special events. Incorporated in mounted bands since the 12th century, timpani and trumpets or bugles were, from the middle of the 15th century, employed to motivate mounted troops in battle as well as on parades and ceremonies.

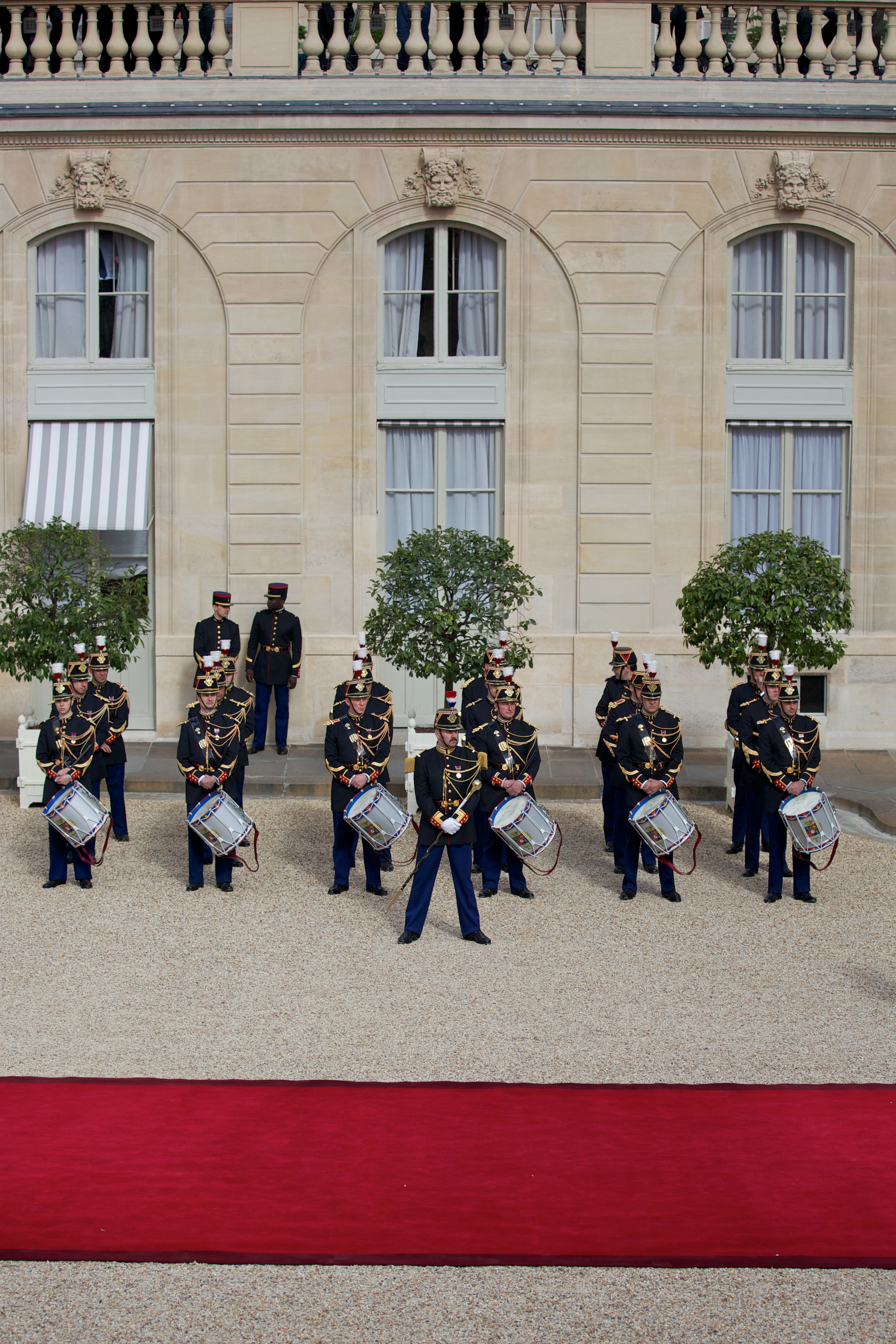
The dismounted Fanfare Band of the Republican Guard.

In the early 19th century, the natural horn came into being as a signalling instrument for the light infantry in France, Germany and the Netherlands (and later on, Spain, where the Spanish Army's' Cazadores rifle regiments, formerly light infantry, began to use the instrument in the beginning of the century, only to be later replaced by the bugle in most units in the 20th).

The modern fanfare band first appeared during the 19th century, especially in Germany and France, but it is in Belgium where the first modern band was formed. Founded in 1806 at Izegem and currently known as the Koninklijke Stadsfanfaren Izegem (www.ksfi.be), it is the oldest and still performing Fanfare Band / Orchestra in the world. At the same time, similar formations were also raised in the Netherlands. And by the late 19th century, fanfare bands and drum and bugle corps became the official field music formation within the French, Dutch, Spanish, Italian, Turkish (Ottoman), Portuguese, Serbian, Bulgarian and Belgian armies, with the bugle replacing the fife in the infantry and other arms (in the case of the Ottoman formations, replacing the centuries' old traditions of the Ottoman military band). In the United Kingdom bugle bands were adopted mostly by civil and youth uniformed organizations in same time as military corps of drums adopted use of the bugle and dedicated bugler platoons were raised in the then two rifle infantry regiments and the Brigade of Gurkhas' infantry component in the early 20th century. Japan adopted the tradition of bugle bands in the late 19th century to serve the Army and Navy, as well as to provide ceremonial music for police and fire services, the tradition has been maintained till the present.

In the beginning of the 20th century, the French Republican Guard Band began developing its own fanfare and bugle section under its director Gabriel Defrance, thus the band and bugles of the French Republican Guard's infantry and cavalry units are the predecessors of today's ensembles. French civilian fanfare bands adopted similar styles at the same time, with the bands being located in civil fire departments and the local police forces, which were patterned in the traditions of the French Armed Forces (Army, Navy and Air Force) and thus sported similar instruments. In 1935 the Band and Bugles of the French Air Force under Claude Laty, then the band director, further developed the modern fanfare band and its standard instrumentation as the band created its own fanfare and bugle section with Maurice Bonnard, the band drum major at that time. In Germany the use of fanfare ensembles was restricted to civilian bands from the late 19th century onward, although the fanfare trumpets survived in military bands till modern times, including until the 20th century, mounted bands. These civil bands form the basis of today's ensembles. In the late 20th century even the use of the shoulder strap and the introduction of valved bugles and multiple tenor drums from the US revolutionized the ensembles and the instruments they use. Today several ensembles in France and Germany use brass instruments in addition to the standard instrumentation as well as the multiple tenor drum. In Spain, the form of the civilian fanfare or bugle band combined with brass instruments is known as the Agrupacion Musical (AM), it is mostly a religious band affiliated with lay brotherhoods and local chapels. They only play the single tenor drum with one mallet, a tradition carried from the armed forces, in the drumline. Regardless of availability of brass instruments or not, some bands are titled as Bandas de Cornetas y Tamborres (BCT), as they began solely with the bugle and percussion. The tradition began in the early decades of the 20th century.

Just as France started its modern fanfare band tradition, then came the formation of the French Fanfare Band Union (UFF) and the Sports and Culture Federation of France (FSCF) which became the governing authority for the civilian fanfare bands and handled their competitive and artistic aspects. Today, these two organizations, joined by two other associations formed in later years, jointly handle the administration, cultural and competitive duties of these bands.

Only a few bands are active in the Armed Forces of the Netherlands today, as well as the affiliated ensembles sporting similar instrumentation, due to budget cuts in the military. As in the case in corps of drums and pipe bands, like those in the UK, those in France are purely musical units in the HQ role in peacetime and with a combat role as assault pioneers or signallers. Only Italy's Nunziatella Military School retains a similar unit today in that country as most ensembles (also termed gruppo musici) are civilian in nature which perform at Palio festivals and civil occasions, among others, dedicated to preserving the ancient tradition as practiced in Italian towns and cities during the Middle Ages and Renaissance eras. There are also 5 fanfare bands in the Portuguese Armed Forces, four Army and one Navy, as well as a number of volunteer firefighter fanfare bands there. Formerly the Armed Forces sported a lot of these formations following Spanish, French and US precedent with their own traditions, including on Navy bases and vessels. One fanfare band in particular, that of the Army's Paratroopers' Regiment (activated 1958 under the Air Force) which is part of the Rapid Reaction Brigade, is unique for its use in ceremonies and parade of the bagpipe alongside the standard instrumentation. This is the practically the similar instrumentation used in ceremonies and parades by the Band of the 8th (Light) Brigade "Galicia" of the Spanish Army.

The fanfare band tradition in Latin America is a mix of Spanish and US influences especially in Central American countries of Panama and Guatemala.

== Instrumentation ==
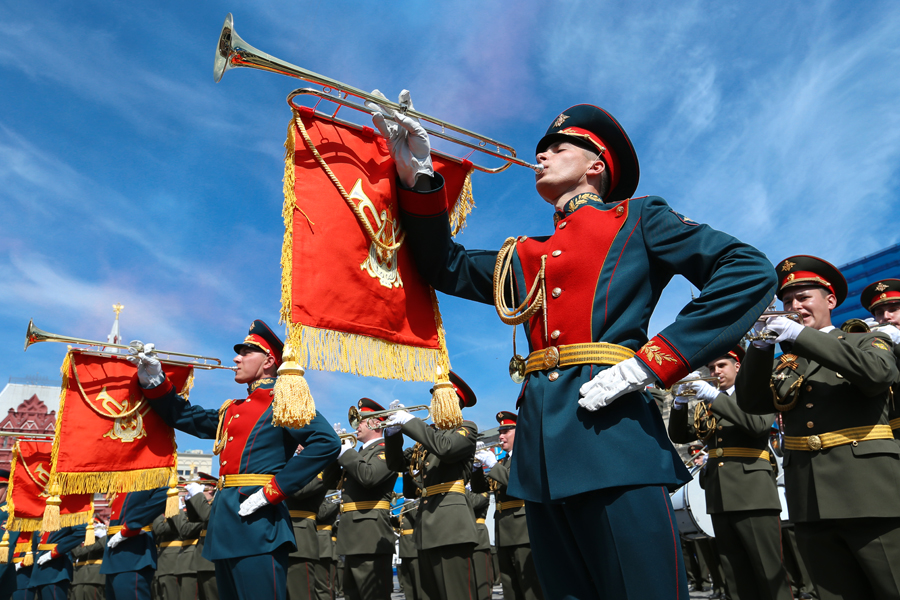
Fanfare trumpeters in the Military Band Service of the Armed Forces of Russia Moscow Garrison Massed Bands. Fanfare bands in Russia are only found in city garrison bands as part of the band unit.

Fanfare bands are composed of the following instruments:

- snare drums (either slung or shoulder mounted)
- field snare drums (Tambours d'ordonannce in French, Tambores in Spanish, always slung or sometimes shoulder mounted)
- either single and/or multiple tenor drums (single tenors are standard use within the Netherlands, Germany, Guatemala, Panama, Colombia, Turkey, Portugal and Italy)
- natural horns
- Cor de chasse (standard use in the Chasseurs Alpins)
- Pless horns (German bands only)
- natural trumpets
- fanfare trumpets (chromatic and herald)
  - Standard natural chromatic (Trompette d'ordonannce in France)
  - French Bass chromatic fanfare trumpet (Trompette basse, in French bands only)
  - Fanfare trompette cor or fanfare trumpet horn (used in French bands, combines the tube of the natural chromatic fanfare trumpet/bugle with the features and bell of the natural horn/cor de chasse)
  - Valved herald fanfare
- bugles
  - Soprano bugles
  - Tenor bugles
  - Bass bugles (Clairon basse in French, longer than standard bugles)
- Bass drum/s
- Cymbals (especially clash cymbals)

Sometimes added or serve also as permanent instruments in the fanfare band are:

- Timpani (especially in cavalry mounted bands)
- Glockenspiels
- Marimbas

The group is usually led by either a drum major or a bugle major that coordinates the timing and speed of the music being played. Only several bands in Germany add the Turkish crescent as part of the ensemble, carrying the band emblem and marches with the percussion. In France and the Netherlands, they are sometimes paired with brass instruments and/or marching brass, and are led by a bandmaster (France only, optional in Dutch bands) with a drum major. These are:

- Trumpets
- Cornets
- Flugelhorns
- French horns
- Trombones (including bass and valve trombones)
- Saxhorns (including over the shoulder saxhorns)
- Alto/tenor horns
- Wagner tubas
- Tubas, euphoniums, Baritone horns, sousaphones, helicons (the latter also in mounted bands)
- Valved bugles used in United States drum and bugle corps:
  - Soprano Bugles
  - Alto bugles
  - Mellophones
  - Baritone Bugles
  - Marching Baritones
  - Euphonium bugles
  - Marching euphoniums
  - Contrabass bugles

Fanfare bands are sometimes paired with other marching musical ensembles of varying instrumentation or combined with a corps of drums composed of fifes, flutes, bugles, fanfare trumpets and percussion to form a type of massed field music unit and in several cases also paired up with brasses and woodwinds. They may also exist as a sub-unit of any of these ensembles.

== Mounted fanfare bands ==
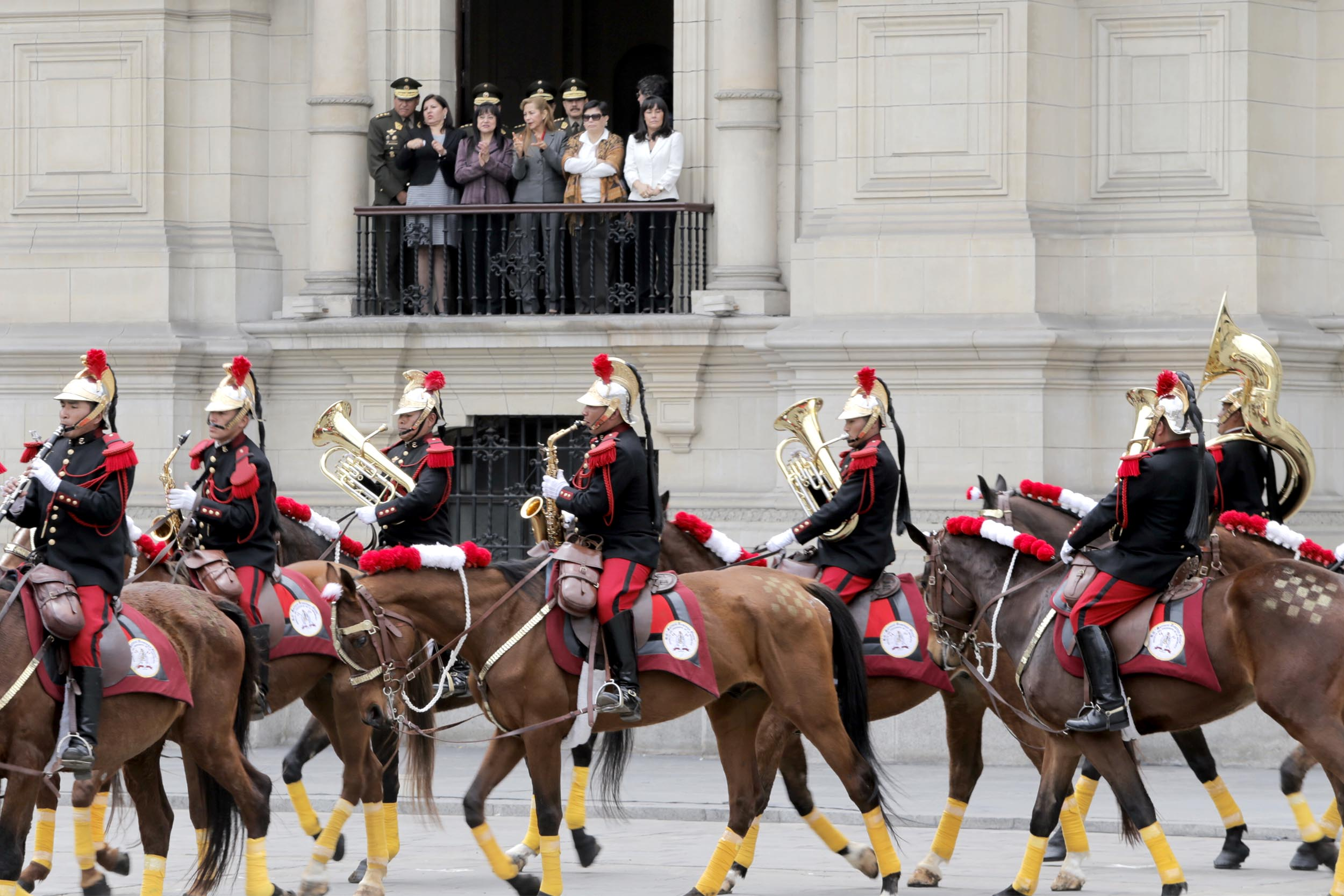
The regimental band of the Presidential Life Guard Dragoons Regiment is the only active mounted fanfare band in the Peruvian Armed Forces.

These bands employ brass instruments, timpani when mounted and marching percussion instruments when dismounted, glockenspiels, fanfare trumpets, core de chasse and natural horns. These military bands are meant for the cavalry, and only a few exist today in the armies of France, Spain (as bandas de caballeria), Peru, Bolivia and Argentina. In addition to the cavalry of the Republican Guard, the Armoured Cavalry branch of the French Army maintains a mounted fanfare detachment for ceremonial occasions - the same case in The Netherlands, which sports a dismounted brass band of this tradition in the Army, as well as another similar band in the Royal Marechaussee.

A few such bands today in Germany are only performing as dismounted civil brass bands, with some wearing period uniforms. However a revival of the practice is underway in Lower Saxony, Germany. A newly founded brass band, the Heidedragoner Brass Band, aiming to honor the legacy and traditions of the 16th (2nd Hannover) Dragoon Regiment of the Imperial German Army, got its horses and its very own drum horse in 2013 and when its mounted training was finished in 2016, it became Germany's first ever military styled civilian mounted brass band, the first ever to be organized in recent years, dressed in military-style uniforms.

The tradition of the dismounted fanfare band is also carried on by the Fanfare Band of the Royal Marechaussee in the Netherlands. A few veterans and reserve bands there hold on to the historic fanfare and bugle band traditions of the Dutch military.

== See also ==
- Marching band
- Military band
- Fanfare orchestra for information on the brass band-styled ensembles
- U.S. Army Herald Trumpets
- Corps of drums
- Drum and bugle corps (classic)
- Pipe band, Bagad
- Italian Bersaglieri Bands
- Marching brass for detailed information on the valved bugles used in fanfare bands in several European countries
