= Contrabass bugle =

Lowest-pitched brass instrument

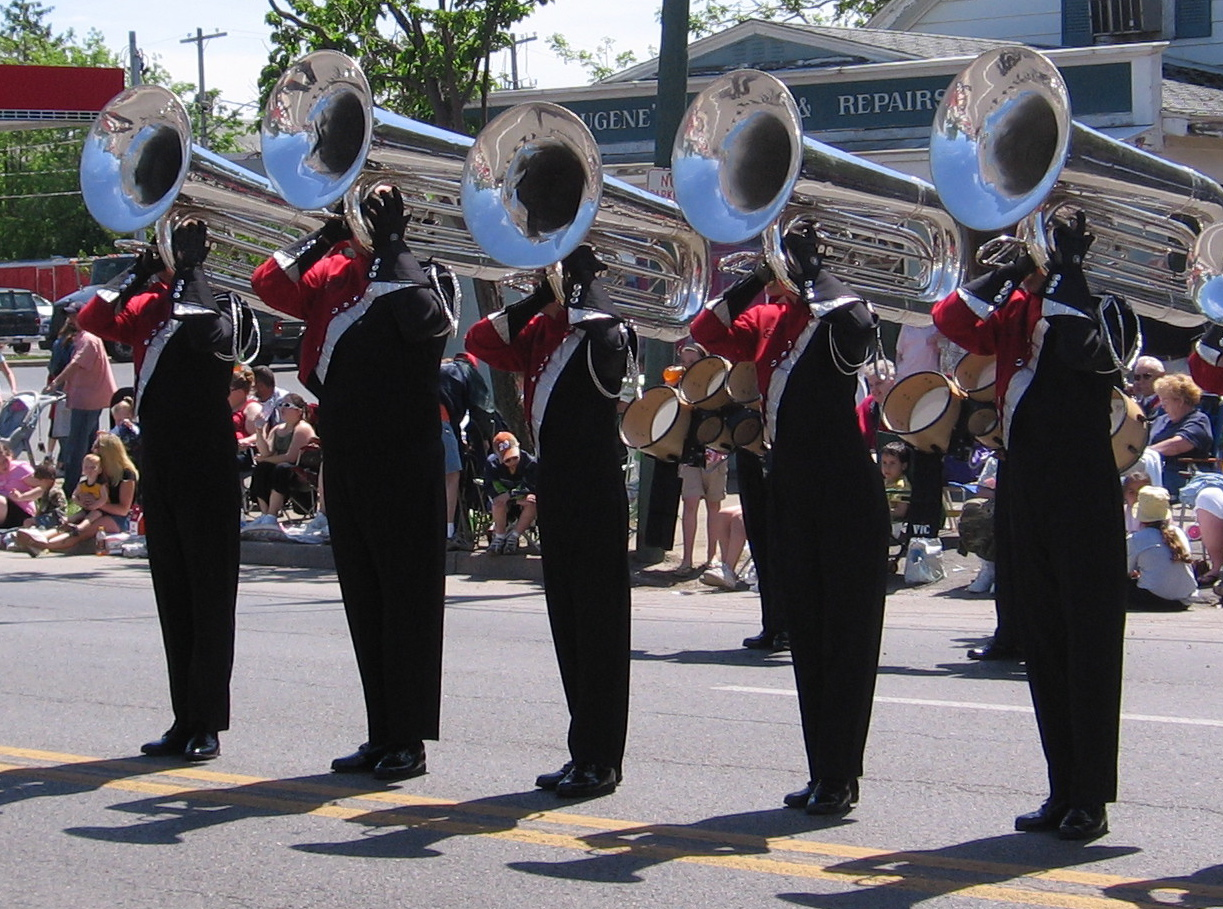
Members of the Syracuse Brigadiers Drum and Bugle Corps hornline in 2007 with contrabasses

The contrabass bugle (often shortened to contra or simply called the marching tuba) is the lowest-pitched brass instrument in the drum and bugle corps and marching band hornline. It is the drum corps' counterpart to the marching band's sousaphone: the lowest-pitched member of the hornline, and a replacement for the concert tuba on the marching field.

The contrabass bugle is different from the other members of the marching band and drum corps hornlines in that it rests on the shoulder of the player, rather than being held in front of the body. Because the contrabass bugle can get in the way of commonly worn headgear, such as a shako, it is not uncommon for contrabass players to wear a beret instead of whatever else the rest of the ensemble is wearing for headgear. This also gives the players some distinction from the rest of the brass ensemble.

== History ==
The first contrabass bugle was developed in the 1960s by Whaley Royce, a Canadian instrument manufacturer which produced bugles for many drum corps of that era. Matching all other competition bugles at the time, these early contrabass bugles were pitched in the key of GG, making them significantly larger than all tubas to that date, apart from the rare subcontrabass tuba.

The contrabass bugle is the only member of the drum corps bugle line that has never been produced in a valve-less style, as it was developed when the drum corps rules allowed one piston valve and one rotary valve. They changed to fit new rules along with the rest of the drum corps hornline, first receiving two vertical (or in this case, slanted for ease of use) piston valves, then 3 and later 4 valves to make the instrument fully chromatic.

Equivalent instruments in the key of BB♭ and CC were produced by instrument manufacturers for marching bands who wished to possess the sound of these contrabass bugles, generally regarded as "darker", without losing hornline sonority by having the basses in a different overtone series from the rest of the hornline (or requiring marching tubists to learn another set of fingerings for tuba parts originally written for BB♭ and CC instruments).

In the 2000s, contrabass bugles often have three or four valves, as is common on concert tubas. Like most of their concert counterparts, they are pitched in either C or BB♭, although within the dwindling number of drum corps still using older instruments, they are, like the rest of the traditional bugle line, pitched in the key of G (or GG, depending on which naming convention is used). Instruments in any of these keys are generally larger in modern times compared to their older counterparts, although improved materials and construction techniques in the manufacture of instruments allows them to be made stronger and lighter than before.

== Construction and naming ==
With most circuits now permitting B♭, C, and F instruments, the modern contrabass bugle is essentially a concert tuba converted for ease of marching. Generally, the primary differences between pure concert tubas and contrabass bugles are

1. On both pure marching and convertible tubas, the concert leadpipe, with the pipe curving around the bell to the valves, is replaced with one that curves forward and back, placing the mouthpiece in an appropriate location for the new playing position, on the left (or occasionally, right) shoulder (which has earned it the nicknames of "shoulder rocket" and "shoulder cannon"), rather than in front of the player. On some "Marching-Convertible" models, this leadpipe can be unscrewed and replaced with a concert model.
2. All dedicated marching instruments have the valve section rotated into a more comfortable playing position. Some lower-end convertible tubas have the capacity to rotate the valve section between marching and concert configurations.

Although historically (see below) drum and bugle corps contras were pitched in G, the construction was nearly identical to modern B♭ and C instruments, the only differences being the length and diameter of the tubing and (at one time) the valve section. In fact, modern drum corps now use multi-key instruments originally developed several years ago for marching bands who wished to emulate the sound of contemporary (G-instrumented) drum corps hornlines.

== Movement and visual effects ==
In a drum and bugle corps, the marching style for contrabass bugles are the same as for the rest of the hornline. However, there can be small differences, especially with effects such as ripples of the hornline. Often, instead of snapping the horn up or down or to the side, the players will have their horn's bell down on the ground and will snap their hands on top of the horn.

The mouth of the large bell of a contrabass bugle can be used to display a colored elastic screen with a logo, as was done by the Madison Scouts in 1985. This usually does not affect the sound significantly, as long as the fabric is lightweight.

== See also ==
- Marching brass
- Fanfare band
