= Bugle =

Brass musical instrument

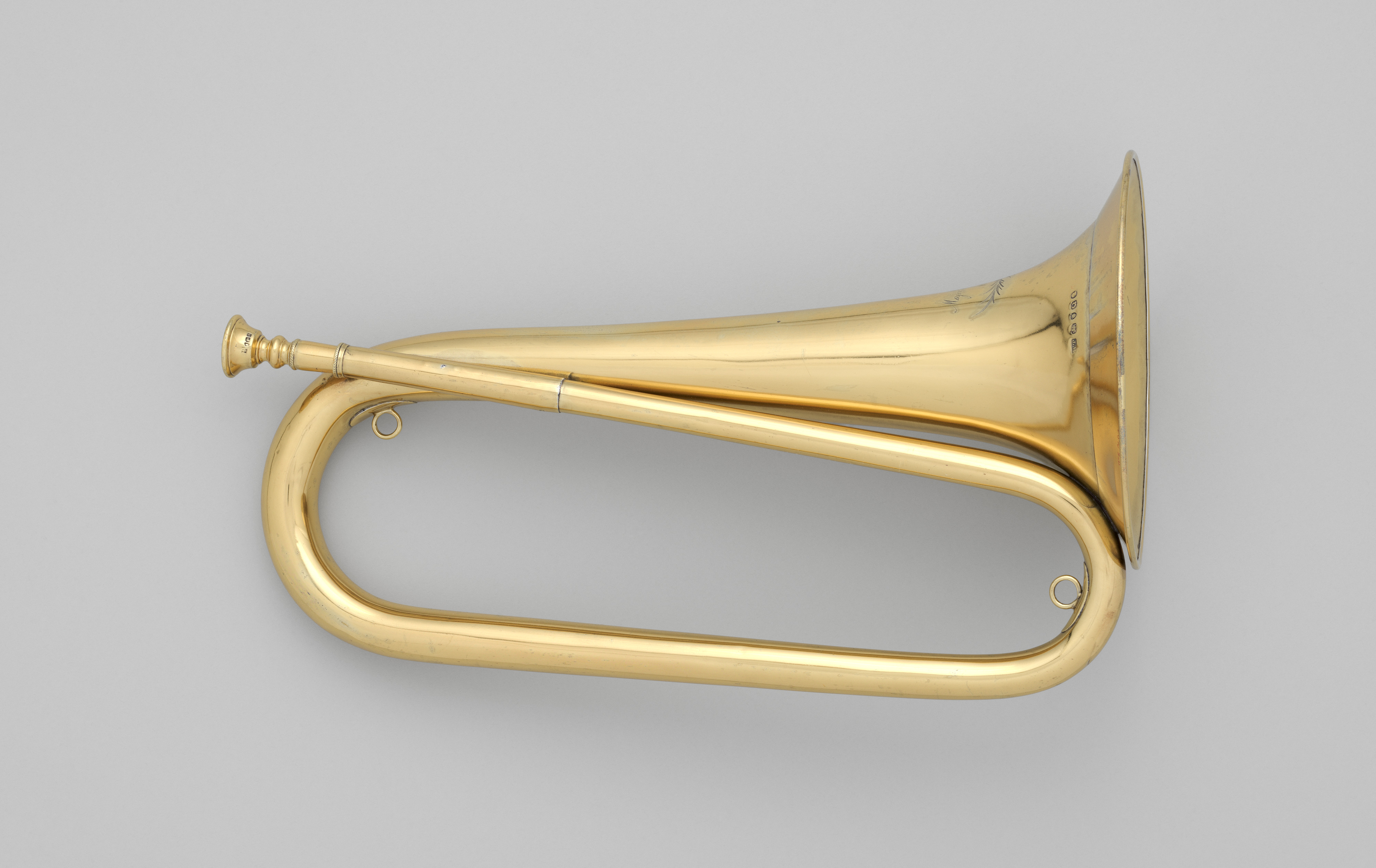
- Bugle in C

Brass instrument
- Classification: Wind; Brass; Aerophone
- Hornbostel–Sachs classification: 423.121.22 (End-blown natural labrosone with curved or folded tube, wide conical bore and separate mouthpiece)
- Developed: Antiquity; modern forms c. 17th century

Playing range
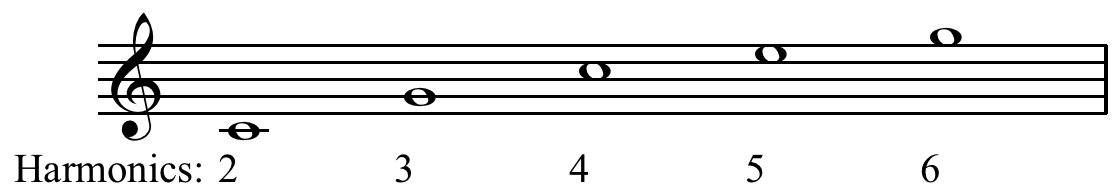
- Five-pitch scale of the bugle in C. Bugle scale.mid

Related instruments
- Clarion; Cornet; Natural trumpet; Post horn; Trumpet

Sound sample
- To the Color, a United States bugle call, equivalent to the national anthem, played on army posts when raising or lowering the national flag.

More articles or information
- Contrabass bugle; Keyed bugle

The bugle is a simple signaling brass instrument with a wide conical bore. It normally has no valves or other pitch-altering devices, and is thus limited to its natural harmonic notes, and pitch is controlled entirely by varying the air and embouchure.

== History ==
See also Clarion and Natural trumpet

The English word bugle comes from a combination of words. From French, it reaches back to cor buglèr and bugleret, indicating a signaling horn made from a small cow's horn. Going back further, it touches on Latin, buculus, meaning bullock. Old English also influences the modern word with bugle, meaning "wild ox."

The name indicates an animal's (cow's) horn, which was the way horns were made in Europe after the fall of the Western Roman Empire. The modern bugle is made from metal tubing, and that technology has roots which date back to the Roman Empire, as well as to the Middle East during the Crusades, where Europeans re-discovered metal-tubed trumpets and brought them home.

Historically, horns were curved trumpets, conical, often made from ox or other animal horns, from shells, from hollowed ivory such as the olifant. There existed another tradition of trumpets made of straight metal tubes of brass or silver that went back in Europe as far as the Greeks (salpinx) and Romans (Roman tuba), and further back to the Etruscans, Assyrians and Egyptians (King Tut's Trumpet). After the fall of Rome, when much of Europe was separated from the remaining Eastern Roman Empire, the straight, tubular sheet-metal trumpet disappeared and curved horns were Europe's trumpet.

The sheet-metal tubular trumpet persisted in the Middle East and Central Asia as the nafir and karnay, and during the Reconquista and Crusades, Europeans began to build them again, having seen these instruments in their wars. The first made were the añafil in Spain and buisine in France and elsewhere. Then Europeans took a step that hadn't been part of trumpet making since the Roman (buccina and cornu); they figured out how to bend tubes without ruining them and by the 1400s were experimenting with new instruments.

Whole lines of brass instruments were created, including initially examples like the clarion and the natural trumpet. These were bent-tube variations that shrank the long tubes into a manageable size and controlled the way the instruments sounded. One of the variations was to create "sickle shaped" horn or "hunting horns" in the 15th century. By the 18th century, Germans had created a "half moon" shaped horn called the halbmondbläser, used by Jäger battalions. During the last quarter of the 18th century, or by 1800, the half-moon horn was bent further into a loop, possibly first by William Shaw (or his workshop) of London. The instrument was used militarily at that point as the "bugle horn."

In 1758, the Halbmondbläser (half-moon) was used by light infantry from Hanover, and continued until after 1813. It was crescent-shaped (hence its name) and comfortably carried by a shoulder strap attached at the mouthpiece and bell. It first spread to England where as the "bugle horn" it was gradually accepted by the light dragoons (1764), the Grenadier Guards (1772), light artillery (1788) and light infantry.

18th-century cavalry did not normally use a standard bugle, but rather an early trumpet that might be mistaken for a bugle today, as it lacked keys or valves, but had a more gradual taper and a smaller bell, producing a sound more easily audible at close range but with less carrying power over distance. The earliest bugles were shaped in a coil – typically a double coil, but also a single or triple coil – similar to the modern horn, and were used to communicate during hunts and as announcing-instruments for coaches (somewhat akin to today's automobile horn). Predecessors and relatives of the bugle included the post horn, the Pless horn (sometimes called the "Prince Pless horn"), the bugle horn, and the shofar, among others. The ancient Roman army used the buccina.

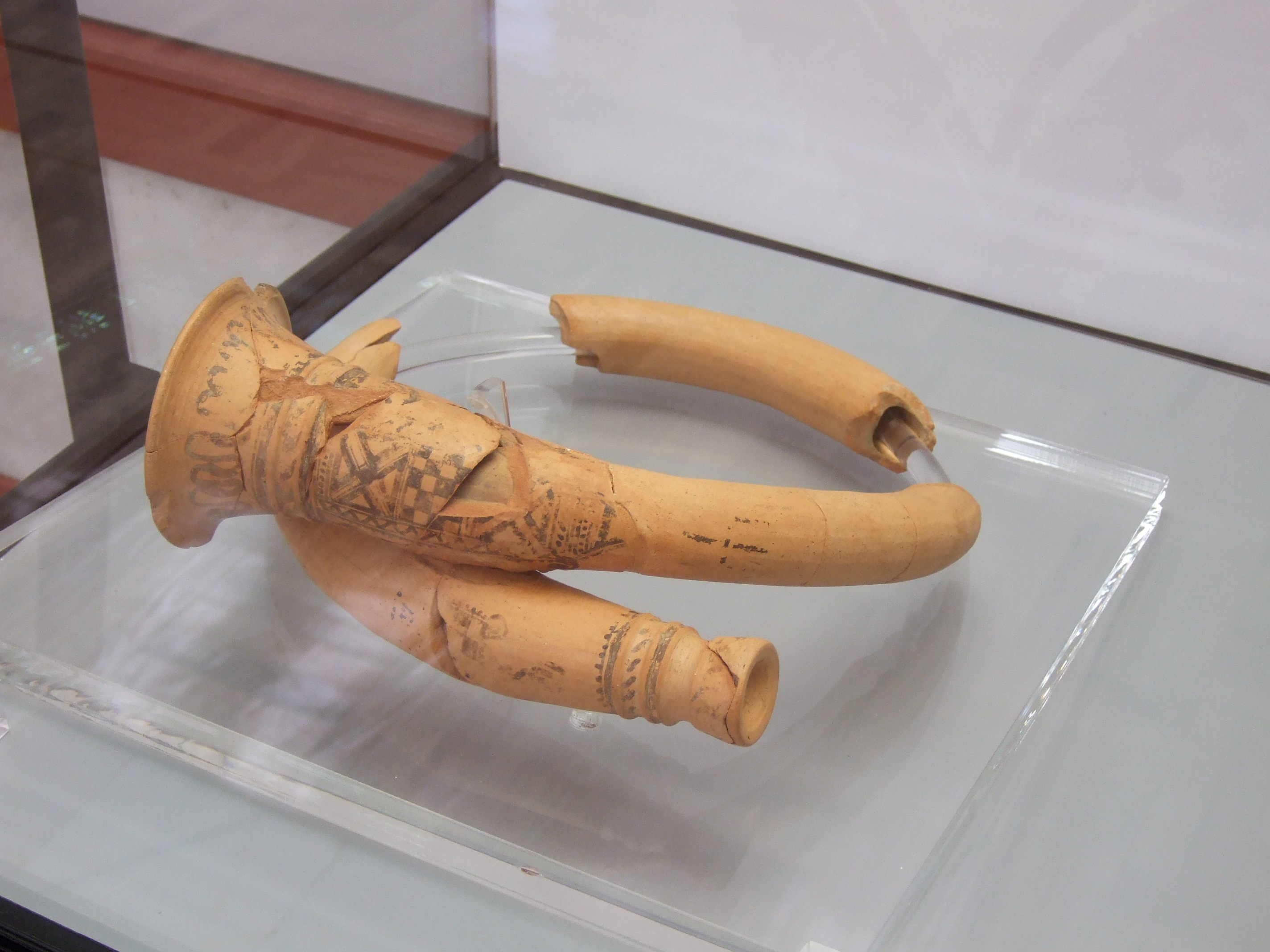
Iberian Celtic trumpet or bugle made from clay, 2nd-1st century B.C., Iberian Peninsula.

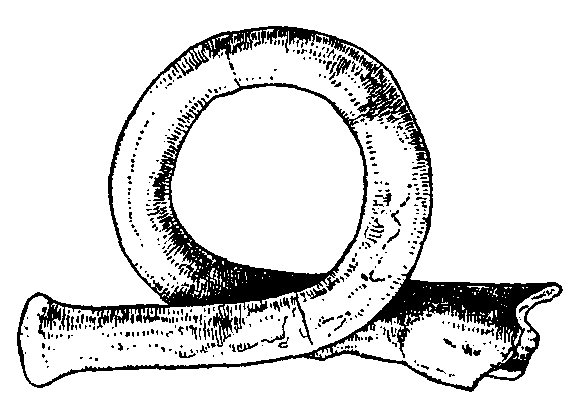
Roman bugle, 4th century. Added to the British Museum in 1904, this late Roman bugle is bent completely round upon itself to form a coil between the mouthpiece and the bell (broken off). Found at Mont Ventoux, France.

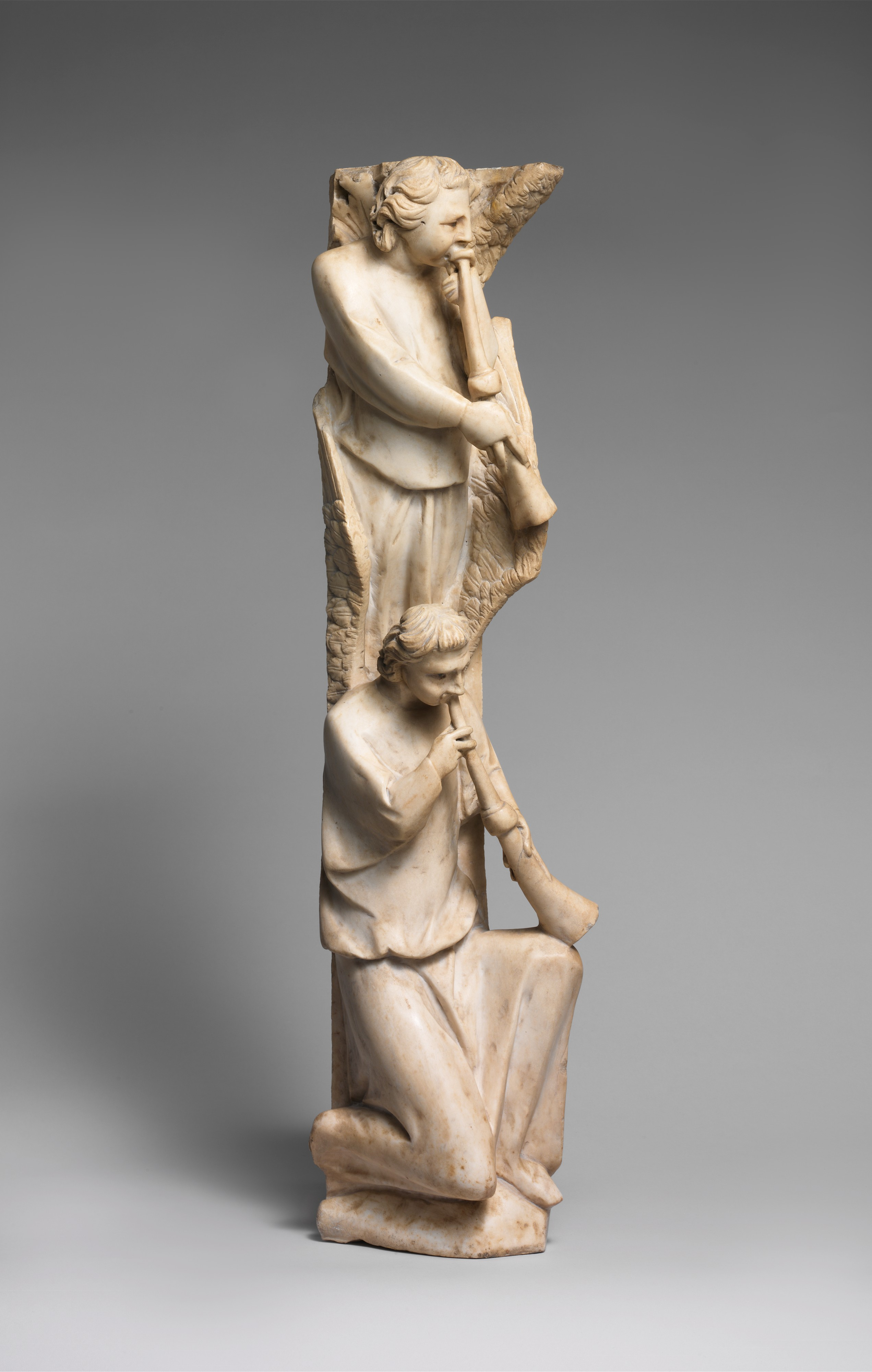
13th century. Angels sounding horns or trumpets. The horns were manufactured in the shape of oxen horns.

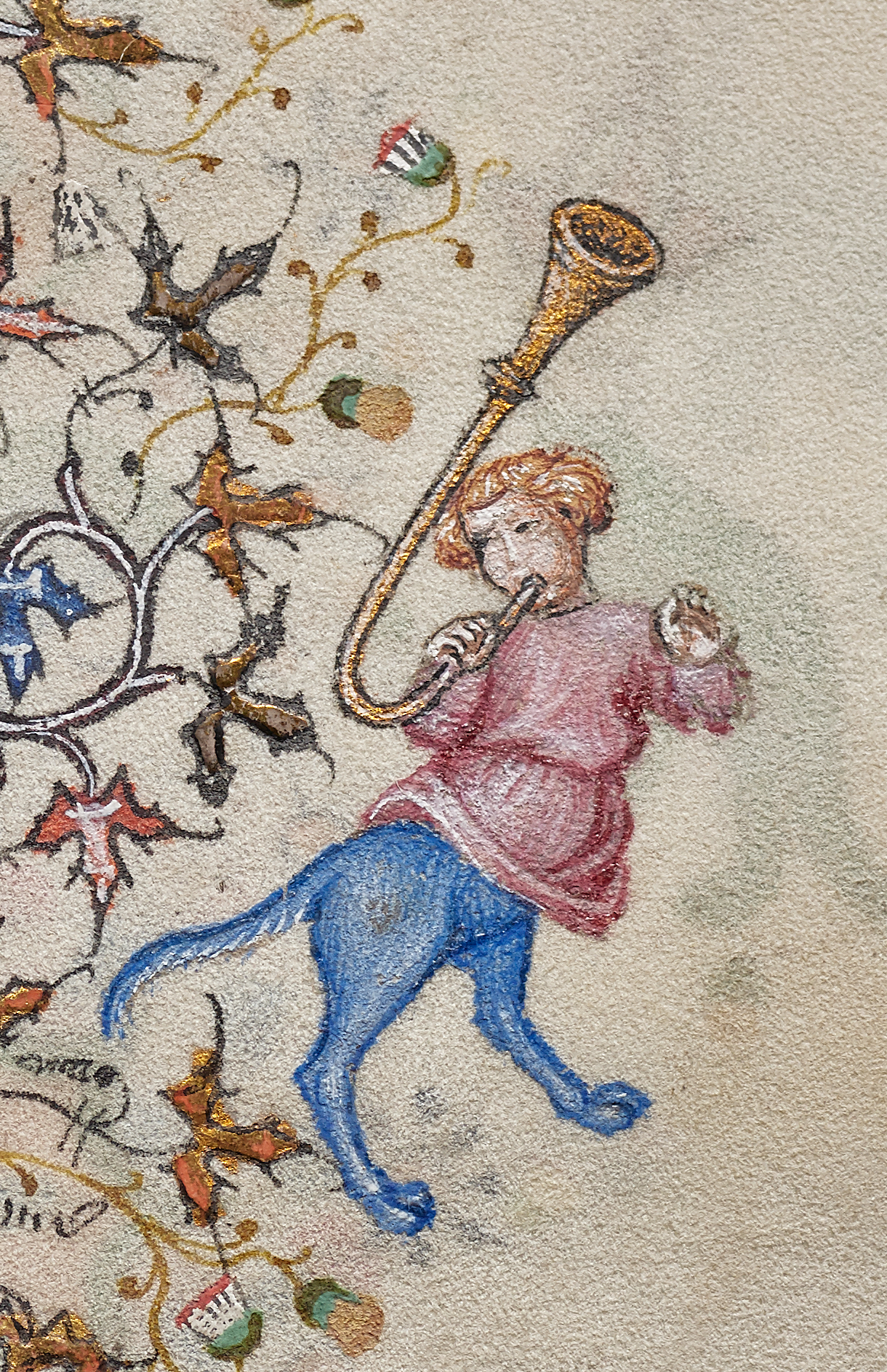
Awareness of trumpet experiments reached a 1405 illustrator in France, who painted a grotesque playing a trumpet bent into a U.

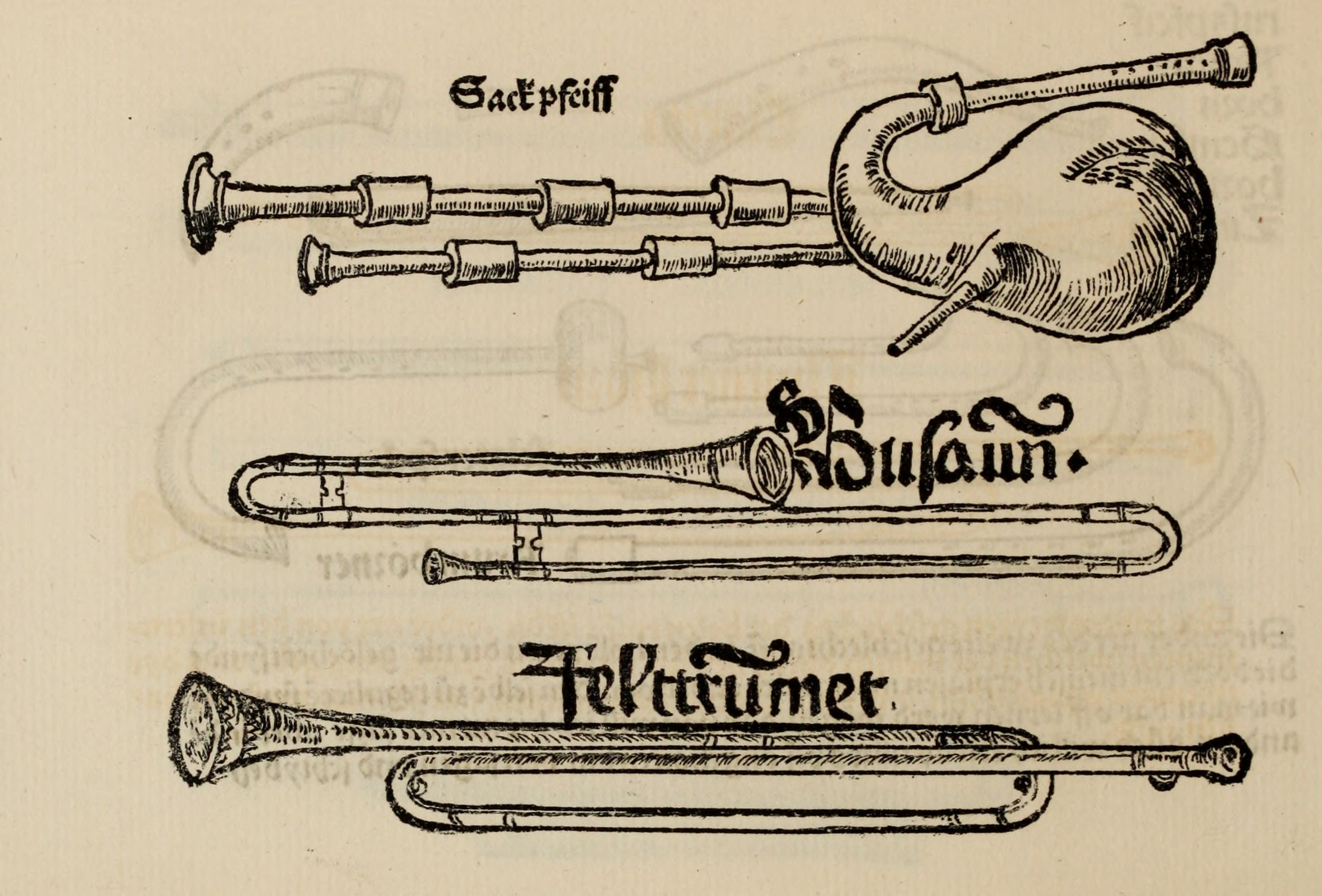
Virdung illustrated (1511 A.D.) bent trumpets including felttrumet (field trumpet) and busaun (sackbut).

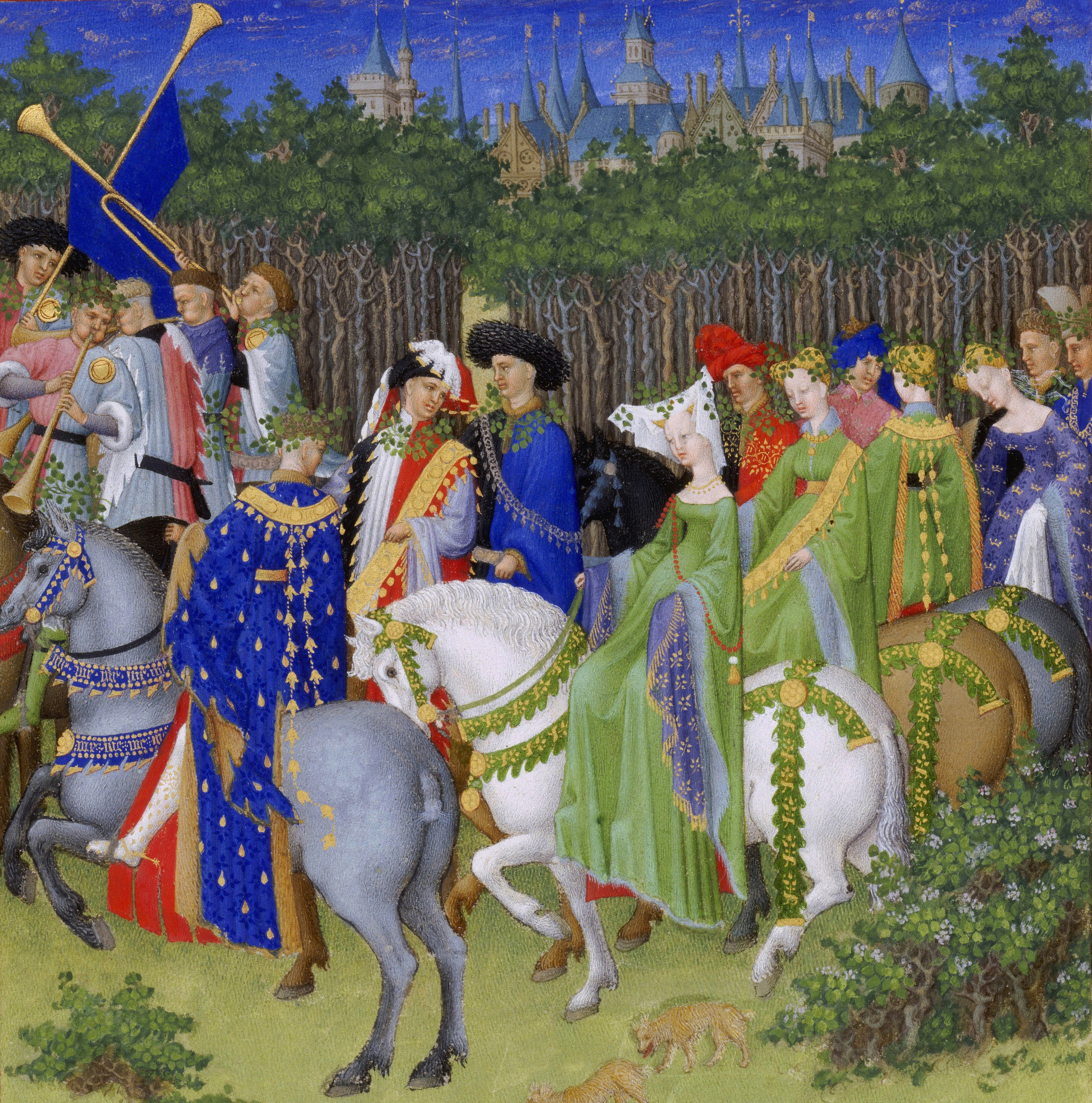
Clarion trumpet, buisine trumpet, 2 shawms. Painted in France between 1412 and 1416. (upper left corner). The clarion matches the felttrumet in Virdung's 1511 illustrations of musical instruments.

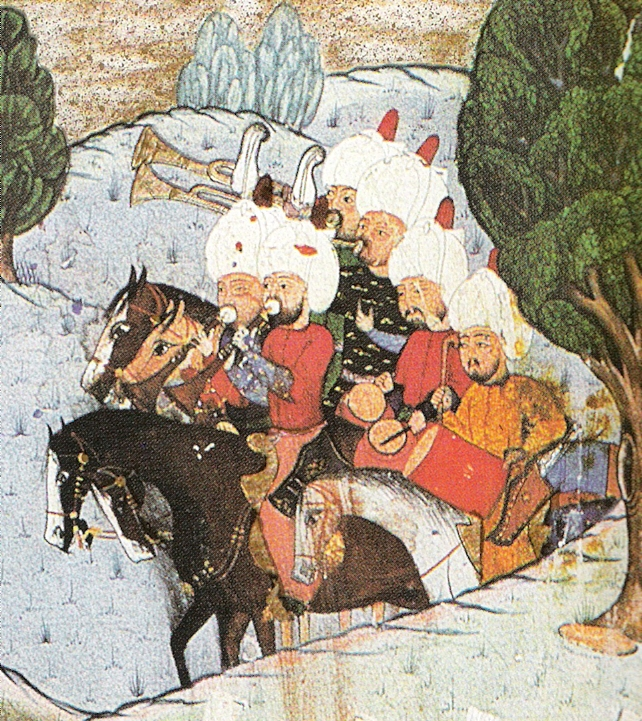
Mehterhâne, Ottoman miniature circa 1568. The musicians play two zurna, two spiral trumpets (boru), a cylinder drum davul and a pair of kettle drums (nakkare). In 1529, the "Turkish field clamor" reached Vienna for the first time.

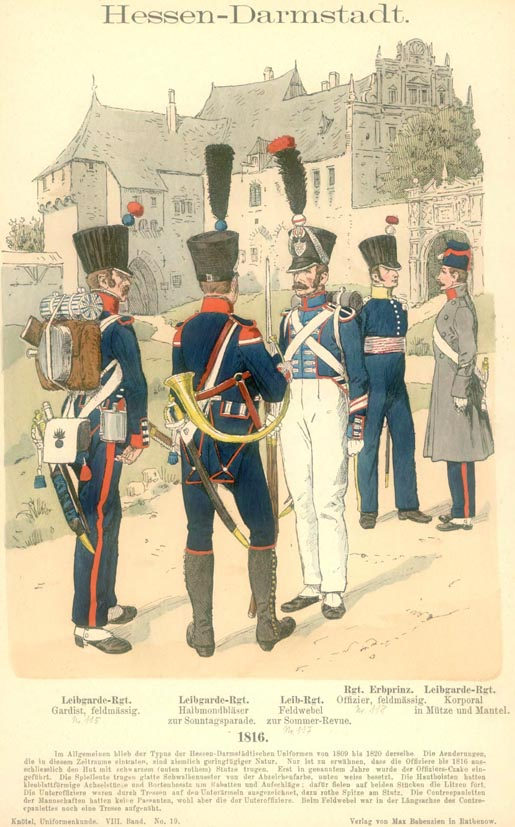
Hessian-Darmstadt soldiers, 1816, one with a halbmondbläser.

== Uses ==
Pitch control is done by varying the player's air and embouchure. Consequently, the bugle is limited to notes within the harmonic series. Scores for standard bugle calls use the five notes of the "bugle scale".

Reveille
Reveille as played on the bugle by the United States Army Band

The bugle is used mainly in the military, where the bugle call is used to indicate the daily routines of camp. Historically, the bugle was used in the cavalry to relay instructions from officers to soldiers during battle. They were used to assemble the leaders and to give marching orders to the camps.

The bugle is also used in Boy Scout troops and in the Boys' Brigade.

The Rifles, an infantry regiment in the British Army, has retained the bugle for ceremonial and symbolic purposes, as did other rifle regiments before it. When originally formed in 1800, the Rifle Corps were the first dedicated light infantry unit in the British Army and were allowed a number of unique accoutrements that were believed to be better suited for skirmishing, such as their green jackets. Other infantry used drums when marching and had whistles to signal when skirmishing, but the Rifle Corps was a much larger body of men that would be expected to spread out over a large area under a single commander. As a result, the bugle was taken from cavalry traditions because signals could pass much further without the need for repeats. The buglers in each battalion are headed by the bugle major, a senior non-commissioned officer holding the rank of sergeant or above.

The bugle has also been used as a sign of peace in the case of a surrender.

In most military units, the bugle can be fitted with a small banner or tabard (occasionally gold fringed) with the arms of its reporting service branch or unit.

In military tradition, the Last Post or Taps is the bugle call that signifies the end of the day's activities. It is also sounded at military funerals to indicate that the soldier has gone to his final rest and at commemorative services such as Anzac Day in Australia and New Zealand and Remembrance Day in Canada.

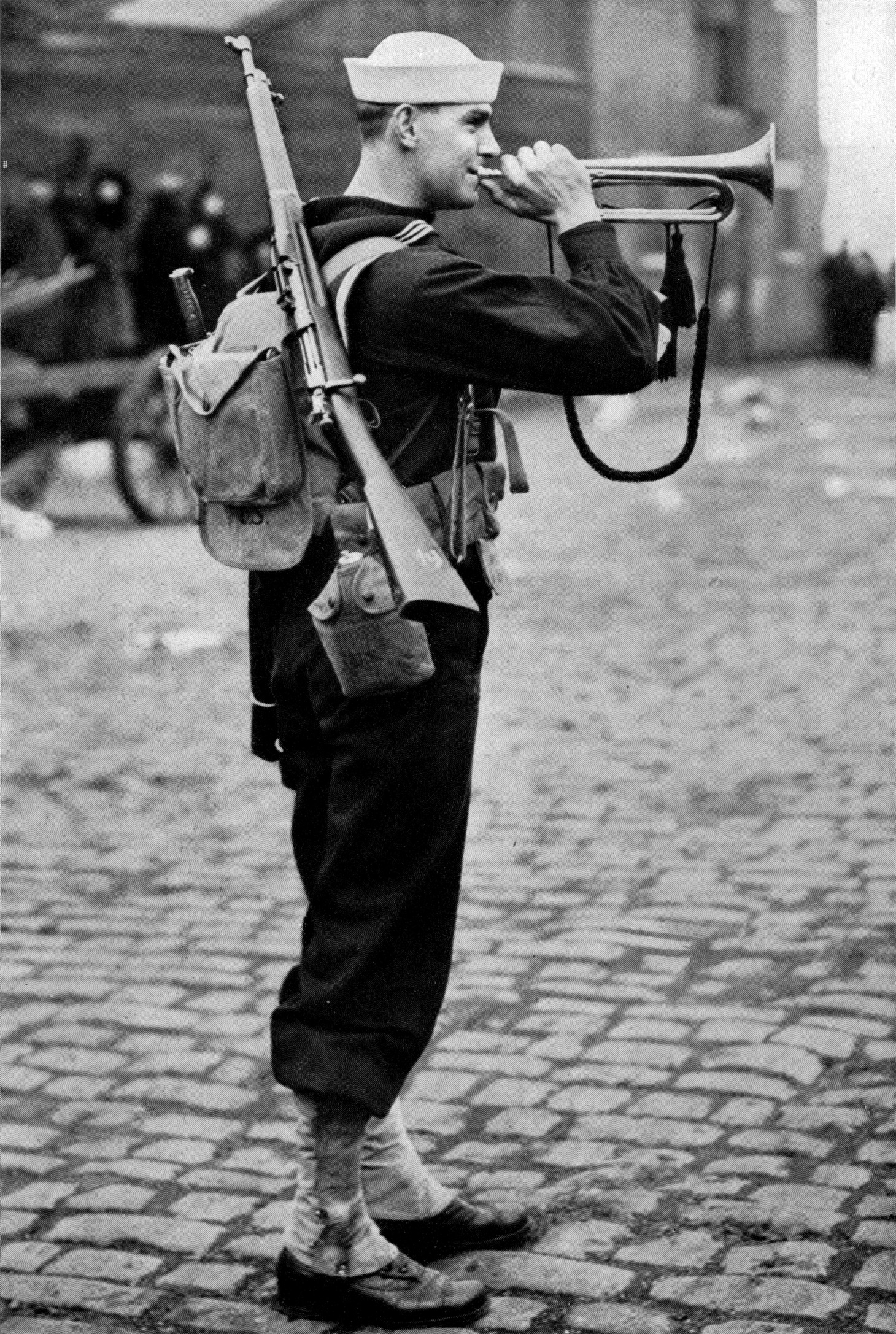
American naval bugler in 1917

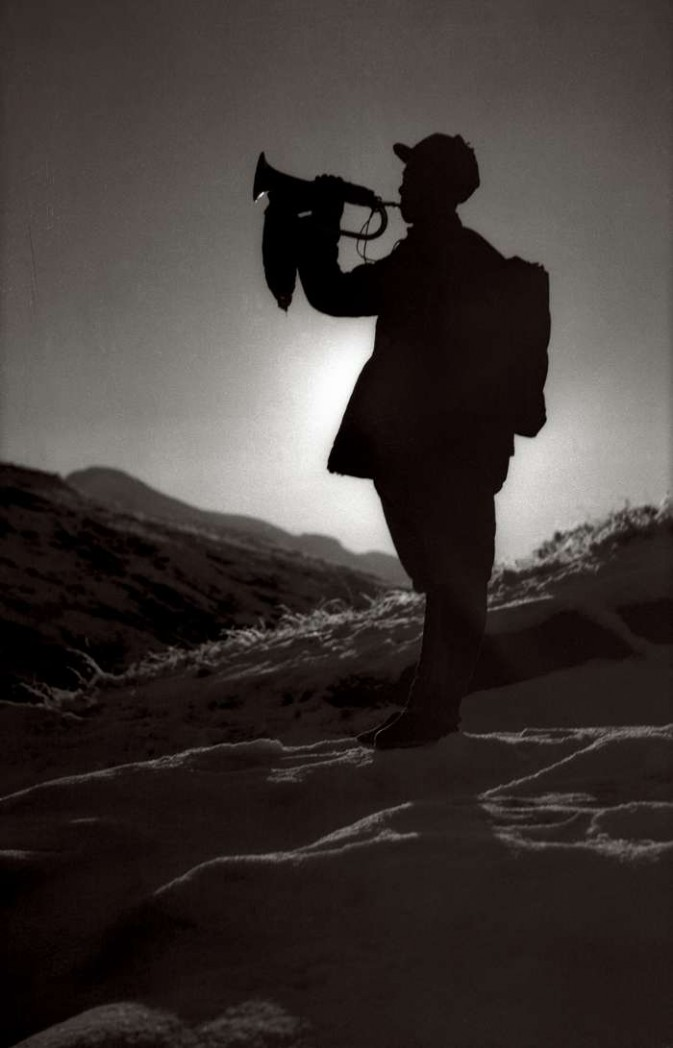
Chinese Eighth Route Army bugler during World War II. Photograph by Sha Fei.

Two Japanese men demonstrating a bugle call, 2017

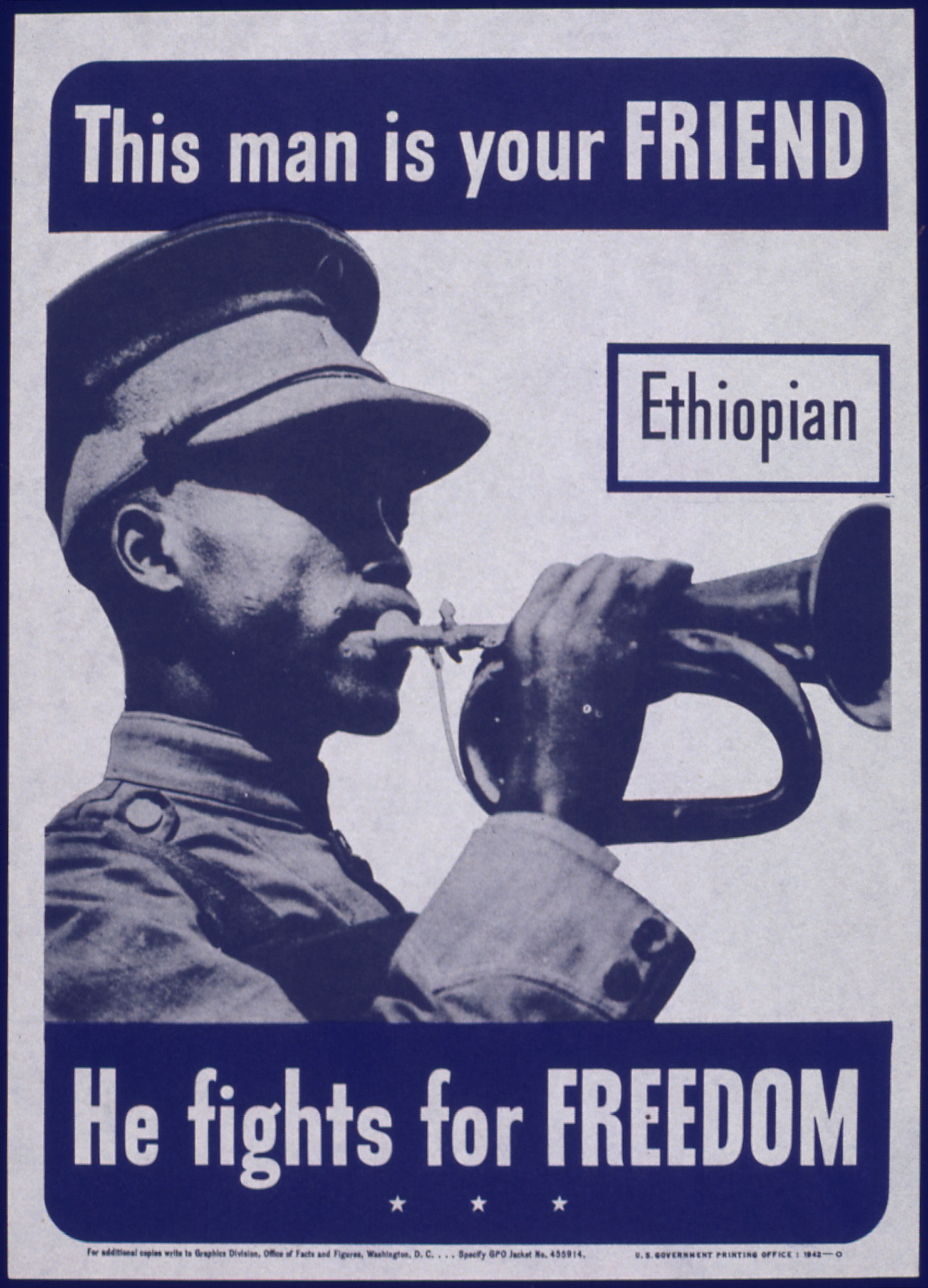
American poster during the Second World War depicting a bugler from the Ethiopian National Defence Force Band

== Variations ==
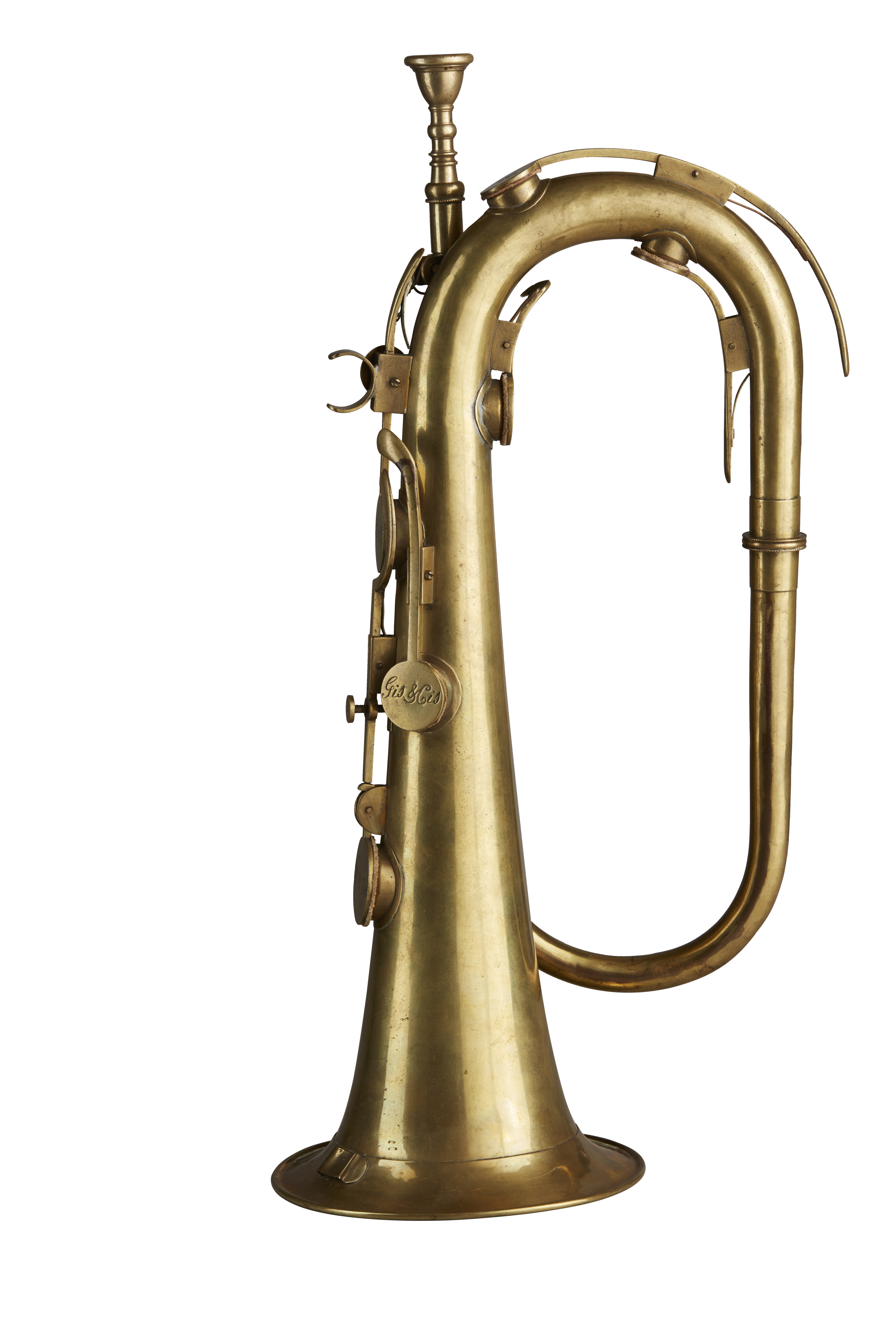
Keyed bugle, c. 1830

The cornet is sometimes erroneously considered a valved bugle, but the cornet was derived from more narrow-bored instruments, the French cornet de poste (lit. 'post horn') and cor de chasse (lit. 'hunting horn'), both variants of the natural horn.

Keyed bugles (German: Klappenhorn) were invented in the early 19th century. In England, a patent for one design was taken out by Joseph Halliday in 1811 and became known as the Kent bugle. This bugle established itself in military band music in Britain and America, and its popularity is indicated by the existence of many published method books and arrangements. It was in wide use until about 1850 by which time it had been largely replaced by the cornet. Richard Willis, appointed the first bandmaster of the United States Military Academy's West Point Band in 1817, wrote and performed many works for the keyed bugle.

Since the mid 19th century, bugles have generally been made with piston valves.

=== Pitches of bugles ===
- Soprano bugle (high pitch)
- Alto bugle (medium pitch)
- Baritone bugle (tenor pitch)
- Contrabass bugle (bass pitch)

== See also ==
- Clarion (instrument)
- Fanfare trumpet
- Marching brass
