= Marching brass =

Brass instruments specially designed to be played while moving

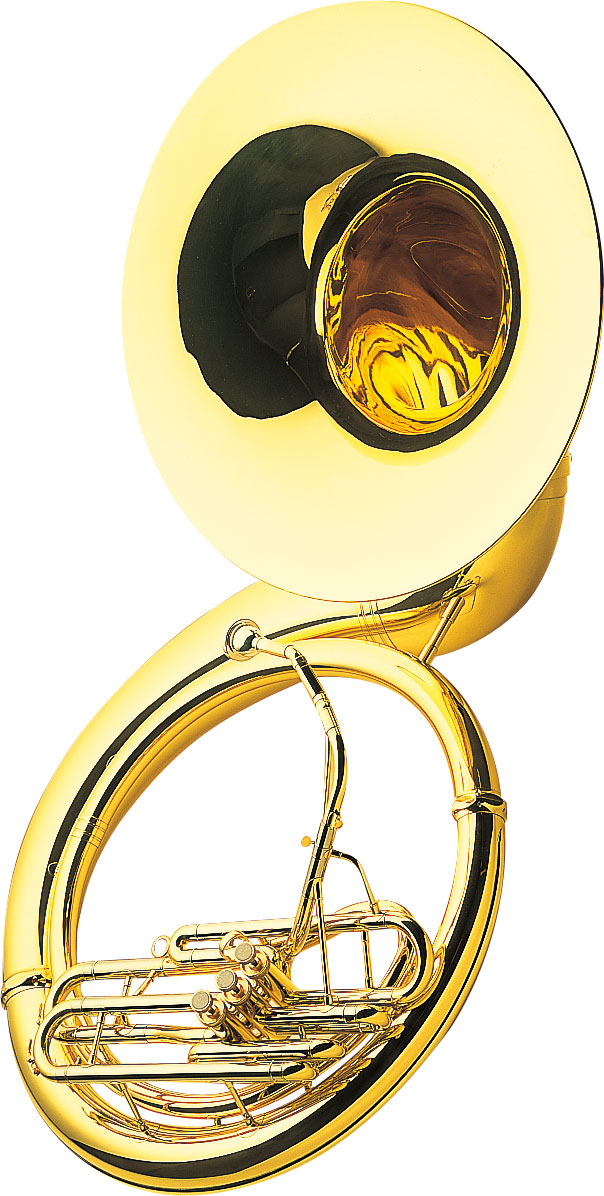
Sousaphone

Marching brass instruments are brass instruments specially designed to be played while the player is moving. Not all instruments have a corresponding marching version, but many do, including the following:

- French horn (replaced by the mellophone or marching French horn)
- Baritone (occasionally replaced by the marching baritone)
- Euphonium (occasionally replaced by the marching euphonium)
- Trombone (occasionally replaced by the trombonium)
- Tuba (replaced by the sousaphone or contrabass bugle)

The main difference between concert brass instruments and their marching counterparts is that the bell has been relocated to project sound forward rather than over (or under) the player's shoulder. These adapted instruments are employed by a number of ensemble types, ranging from high school marching bands to drum and bugle corps.

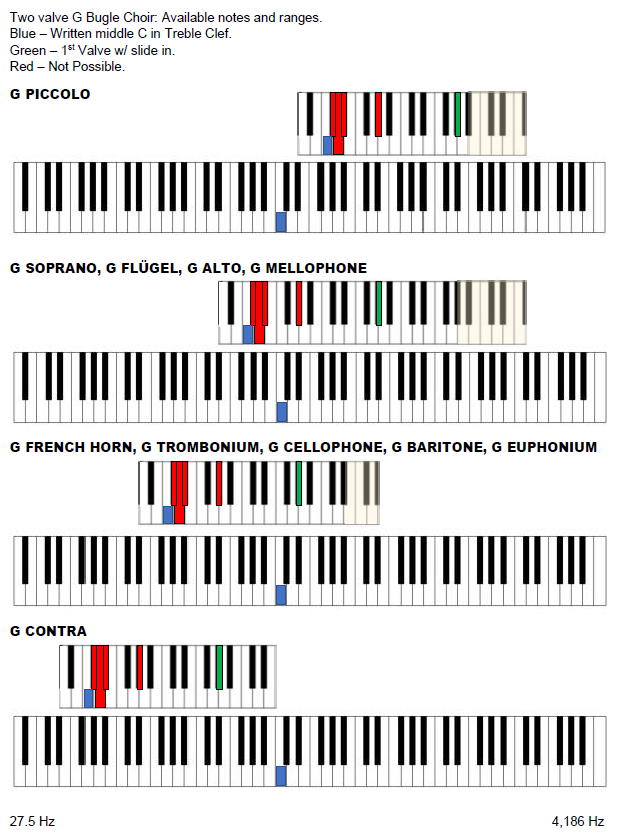

== Bugles ==
The drum and bugle corps activity has been a driving force of innovation behind the creation of marching brass instruments for many decades. The mellophone and the contrabass bugle are among the creations spawned by instrument manufacturers for use in the marching activity due to the influence of drum and bugle corps hornlines.

The bugles utilized in modern drum corps are distinguished from their marching band counterparts mostly by their key: bugles are keyed in G; band instruments are keyed in B♭. Bugle voices are grouped and referenced by the equivalent voices in a choir (Soprano, Alto, Tenor, and Bass). The naming conventions for these various instruments can be confusing however, due to the evolution of the bugles used in the drum and bugle corps activity. All these are descended from the old United States Army G major "straight" (valveless) standard bugles adopted in 1892 Army-wide.

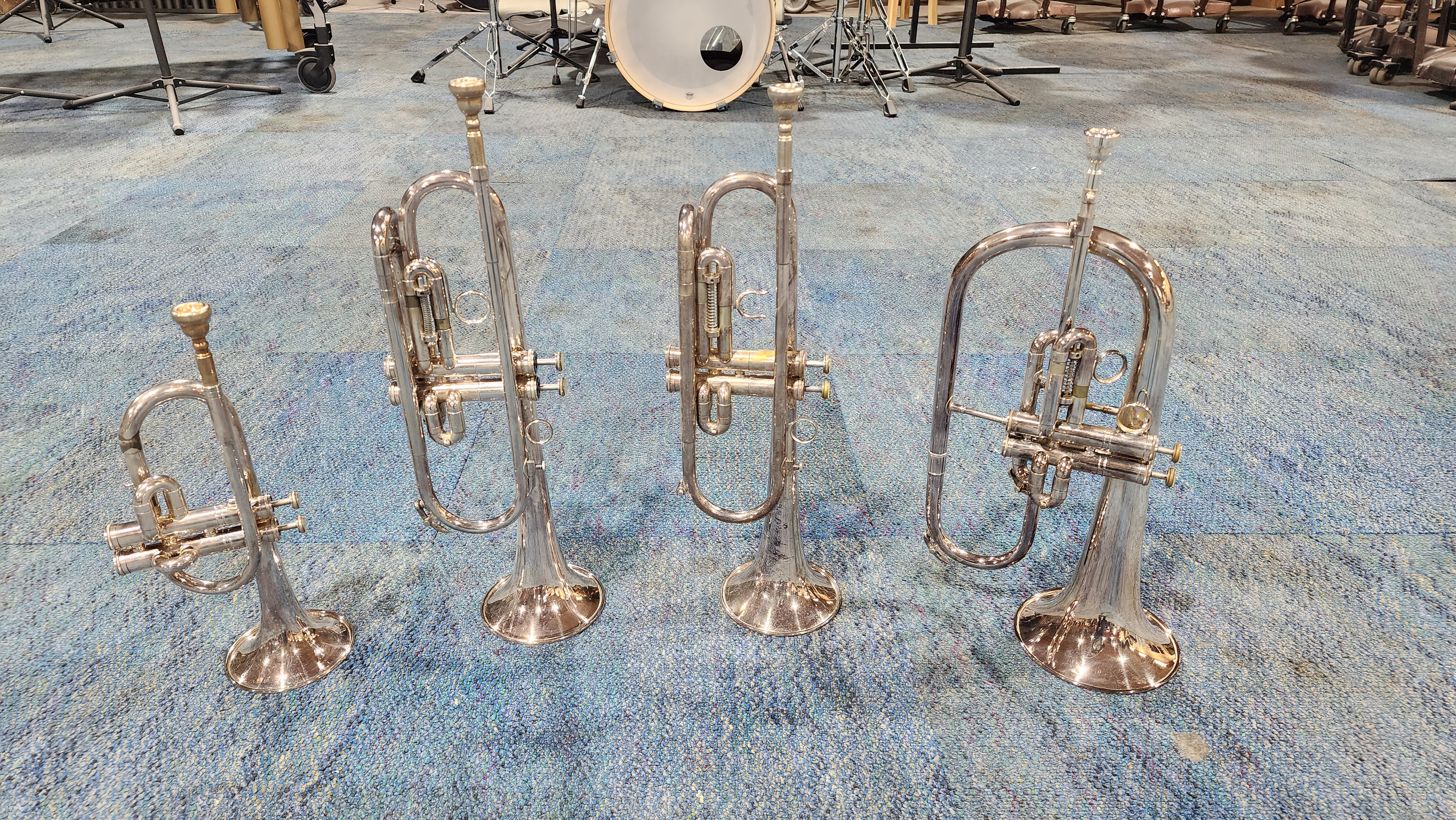

=== Soprano voices ===
In the drum corps activity, there have been two separate types of instruments that have been classified as soprano voices: the soprano bugle and the piccolo soprano.

==== Piccolo soprano ====
The piccolo soprano entered regular production during the two piston valve bugle era in the late 1970s, and very closely resembles a G soprano trumpet in size. Piccolo sopranos were made in both two and three valve configurations, and are no longer mass-produced, but available as custom orders. The primary difference between a G trumpet and a G piccolo soprano is the throat of the bell and the bore size. G trumpets typically have a bore size of .440"-.450" while the G piccolo soprano was offered in a larger .468" bore. This larger bore often led to intonation issues throughout the range of the piccolo soprano.

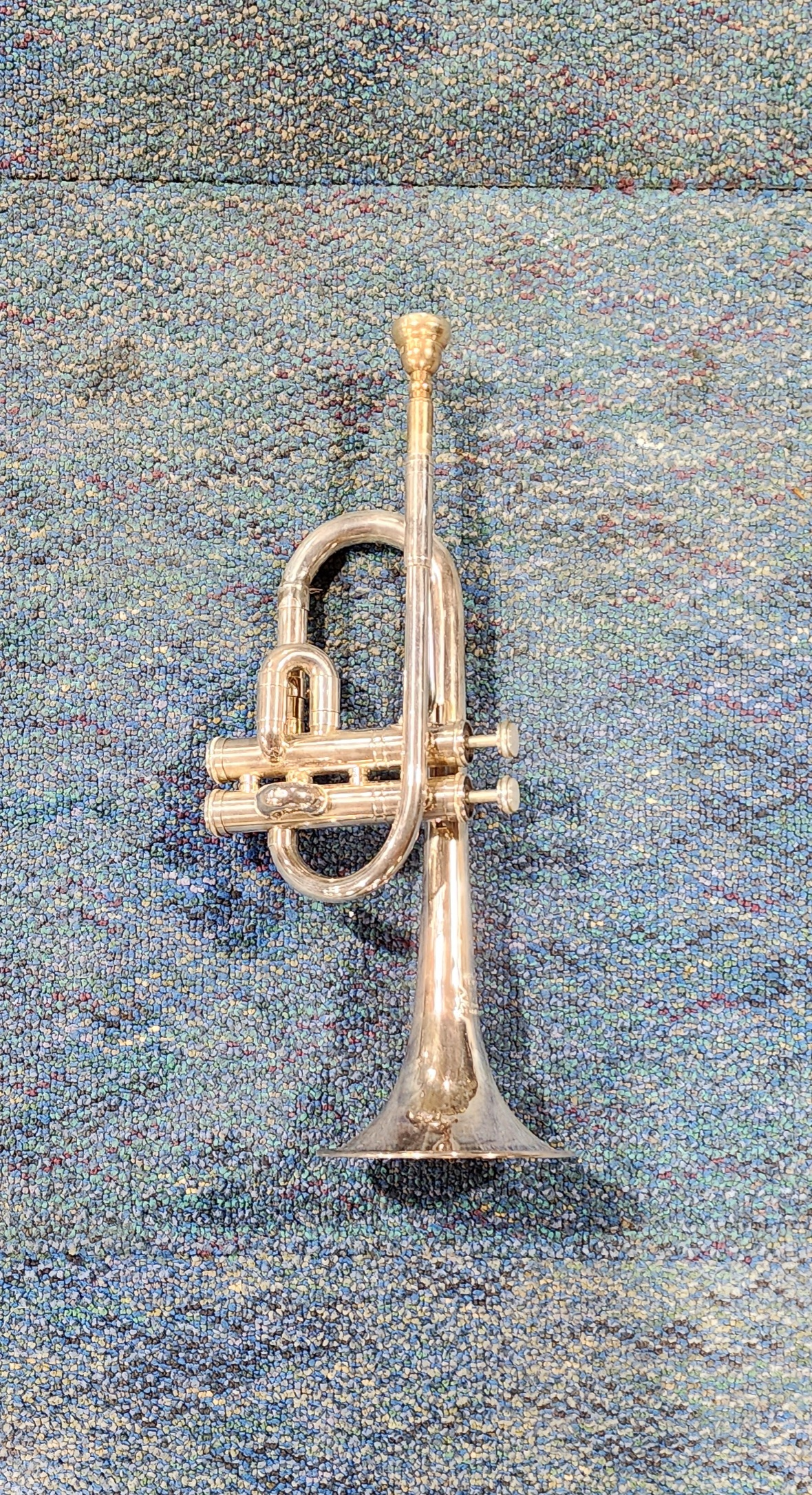

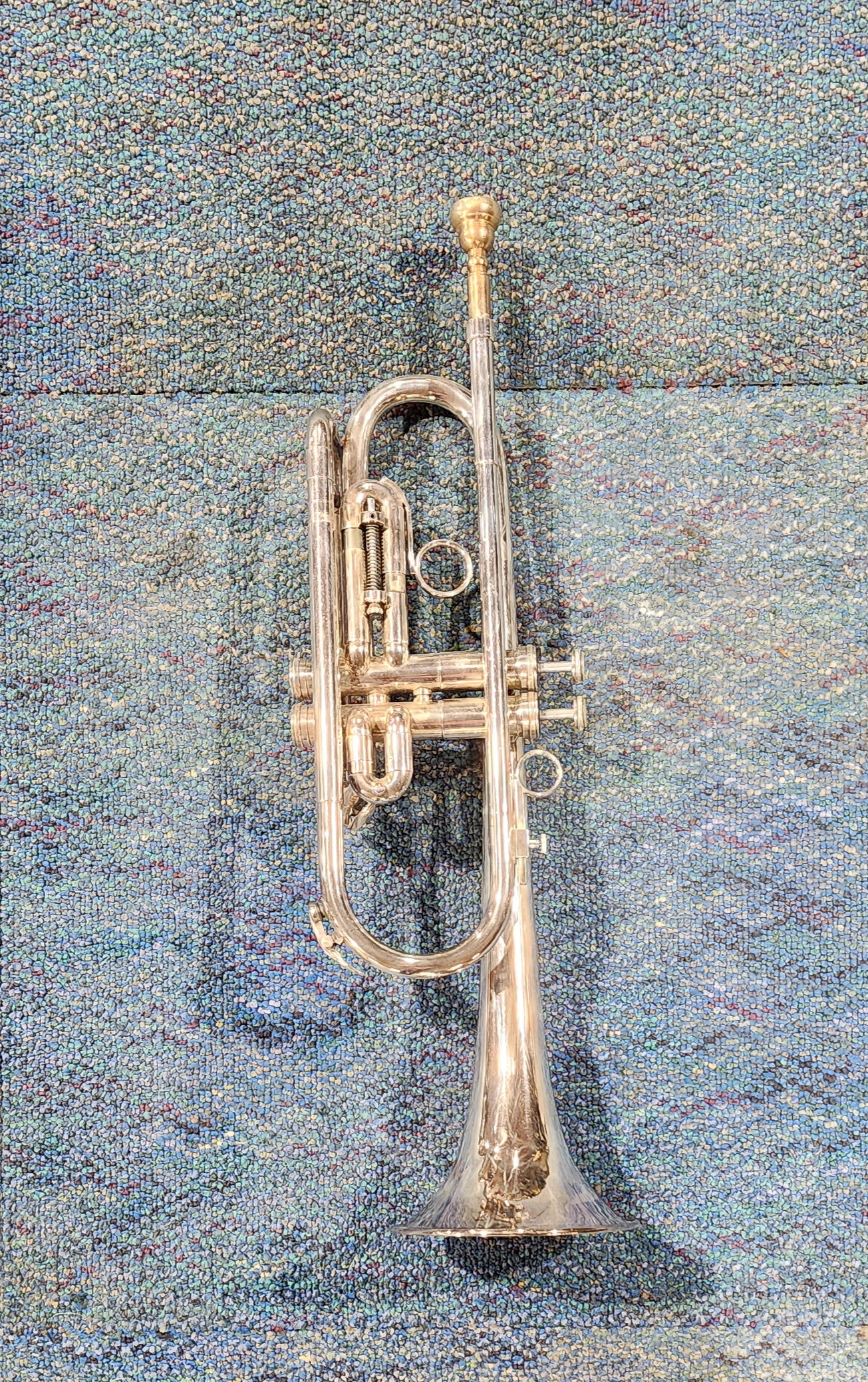

==== Soprano ====
The soprano bugle was the first instrument in the drum corps bugle family. A direct descendant of the M1892 US Army field trumpet which was adopted within the Army and later on by the pioneer drum and bugle corps in the early 20th century, this instrument has undergone every design change since the start of the activity. In early corps, the soprano was pitched either in G or F (F being attained by a long tuning slide) to allow a split ensemble to play simple melodies across the group. The first design change was to add an additional loop of tubing to lower the soprano to the key of D via a locking piston valve tucked horizontally under the handhold. This allowed four possible keys: G and F with the valve open, and D and C with the valve closed. In the 1930s, the competitive circuits allowed the valve to be unlocked, which allowed for more complex melodies to be played by each musician, instead of the melodies being split among 3 or 4 parts. The horizontal valve was still tucked under the handhold, operated by the right thumb. Through the 1940s and 1950s, corps experimented with sanding down the tuning slide to be as quick and smooth in operation as a trombone slide, to allow quick changes in tuning to reach notes within overtone series of the keys of F# and F. Combined with the piston valve, this allowed for notes within the overtone series of D♭ and C. Many bugles were modified with a ring to allow the left hand to actuate the slip-slide tuning slide. Eventually this slip-slide setup became so popular that it became a factory option. By the early 1960s, the competitive circuits approved the use of a rotary valve tuning slide in place of the standard tuning slide on the soprano. The rotary valve was actuated by the left hand, and featured a length of tubing that lowered the pitch by either a half-step (F#) or a whole-step (F). Corps featured sopranos with both slides to allow for the greatest choice of available notes, however these instruments were still non-chromatic. Around 1967, the rules congress standardized an F piston valve and an F# rotary valve. This allowed the equivalent of the first and second valves on a typical brass instrument, with the piston equating the first valve, and the rotor equating the second valve. Older equipment was grandfathered in, however most corps chose to sell their older D piston sopranos or purchase a kit which allowed local band instrument repairmen to remove the D tubing and solder on an F tubing section. In the late 1970s, DCI's rules congress allowed for the soprano to be designed similarly to a trumpet, with two vertical piston valves. The European drum corps circuits skipped the two valve rule and allowed three vertical valves at this time. American bugle manufacturers then designed both two and three valve instruments at the same time, often using the same parts for both. By 1990, DCI approved the use of three valve sopranos in the North American circuit, thus ending the era of non-chromatic bugles. Sopranos are still manufactured by one company, which also still produces a two valve custom version for The Commandant's Own United States Marine Drum and Bugle Corps.

Soprano bugles typically have a bore size of .468"-.470" and come in standard and "power bore" configurations. The "power bore" configurations typically feature heavier bracing, a heavier wall leadpipe, and a slightly larger bell.

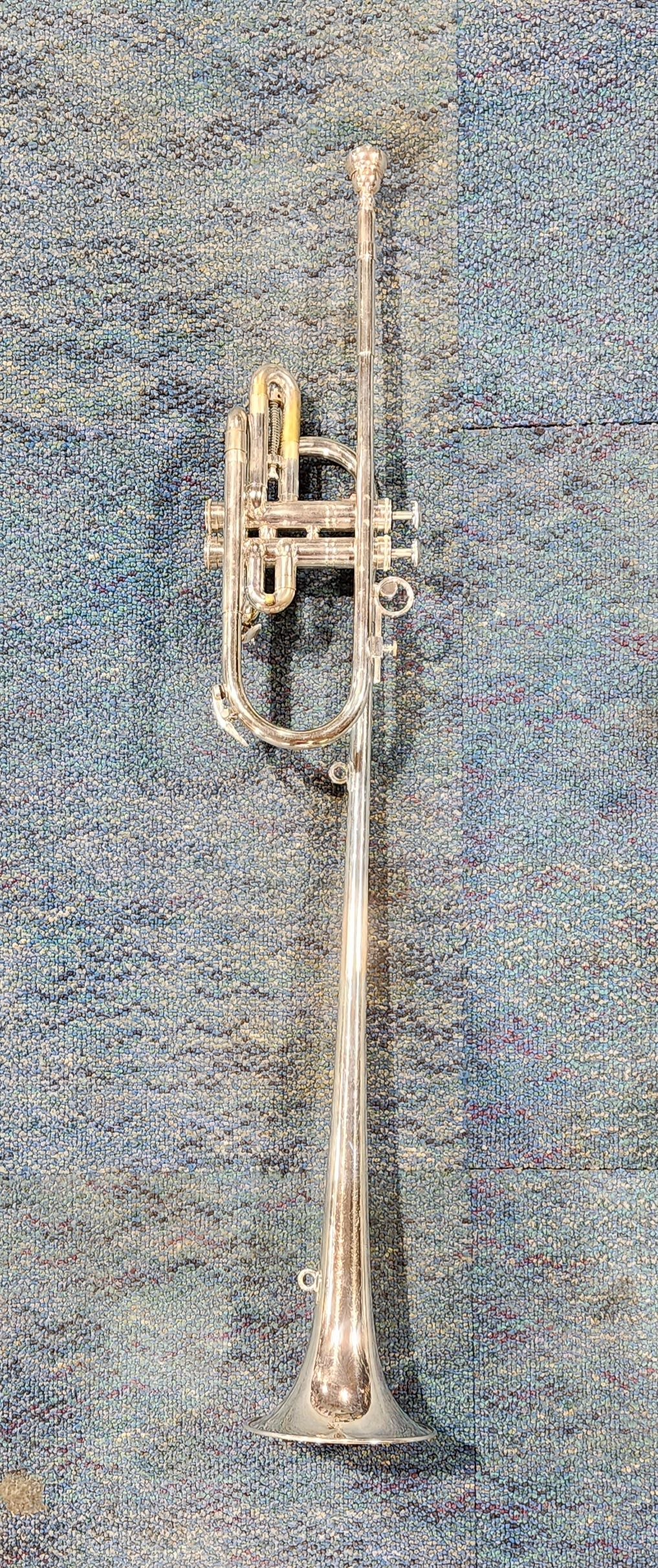

==== Herald soprano ====
The Herald Soprano bugle was an instrument prepared by DEG Music Products for various small ensembles and corps. This instrument uses a standard soprano bugle valve section, with an adjusted leadpipe and bell to allow for a long fanfare-like bell. The herald soprano was built in a two valve configuration and featured eyelets for a banner.

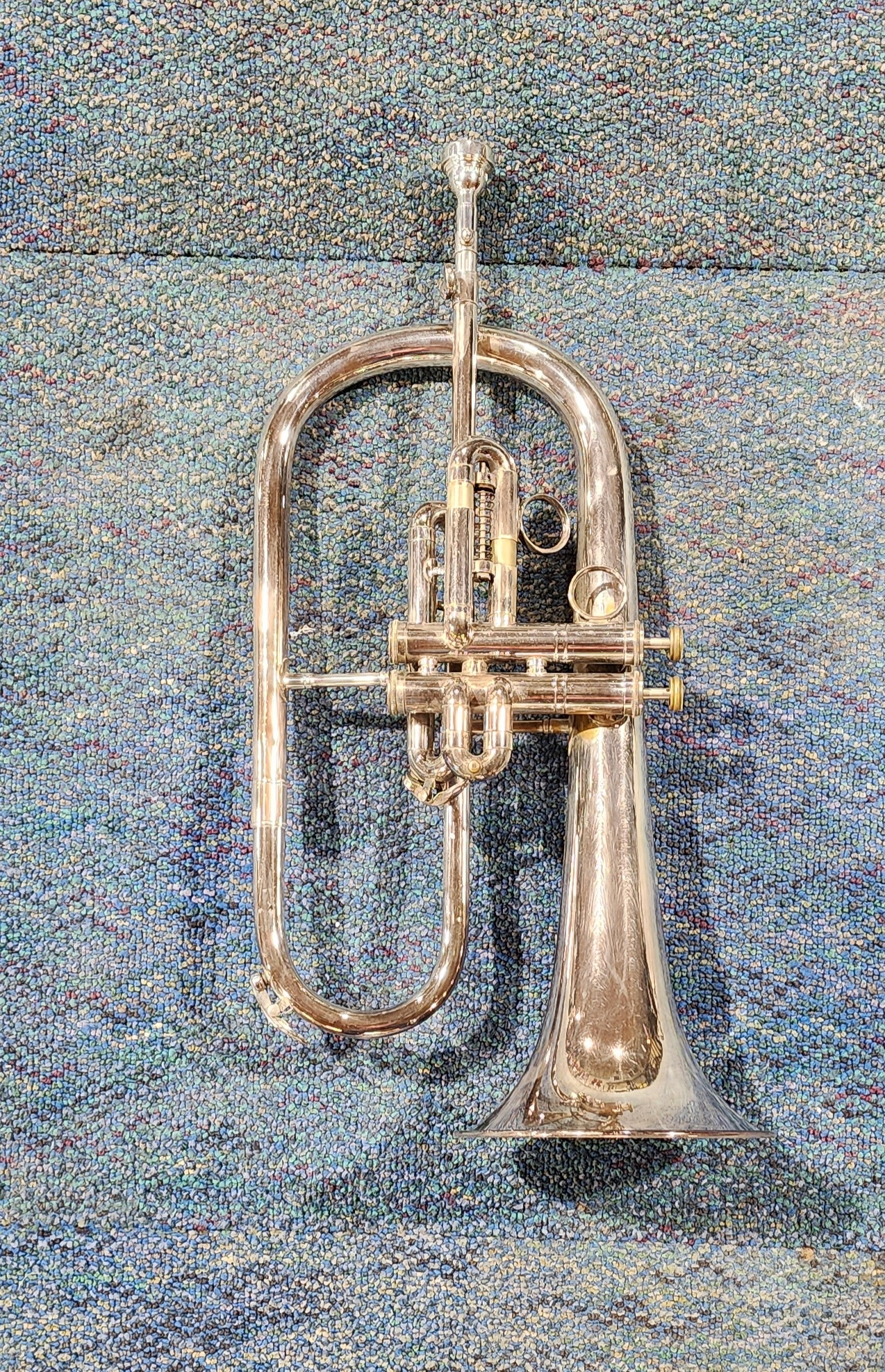

==== Flugelhorn ====
The Flugelhorn bugle was first designed and utilized during the piston/rotor bugle era in the 1960s and 1970s. These Flugelhorns were designed to resemble a traditional Flugelhorn, however with the limitations of the rules congress. During the two vertical valve era, two competing designs of Flugelhorn were designed. One design was based on the more common style of Flugelhorn, with a tunable lead pipe. The other design was based on the trumpet-style design, with a tuning slide and stationary leadpipe. There have been three valve G Flugelhorns produced, however in limited quantities. The G Flugelhorn has the same range as a soprano, and also featured a .468" bore.

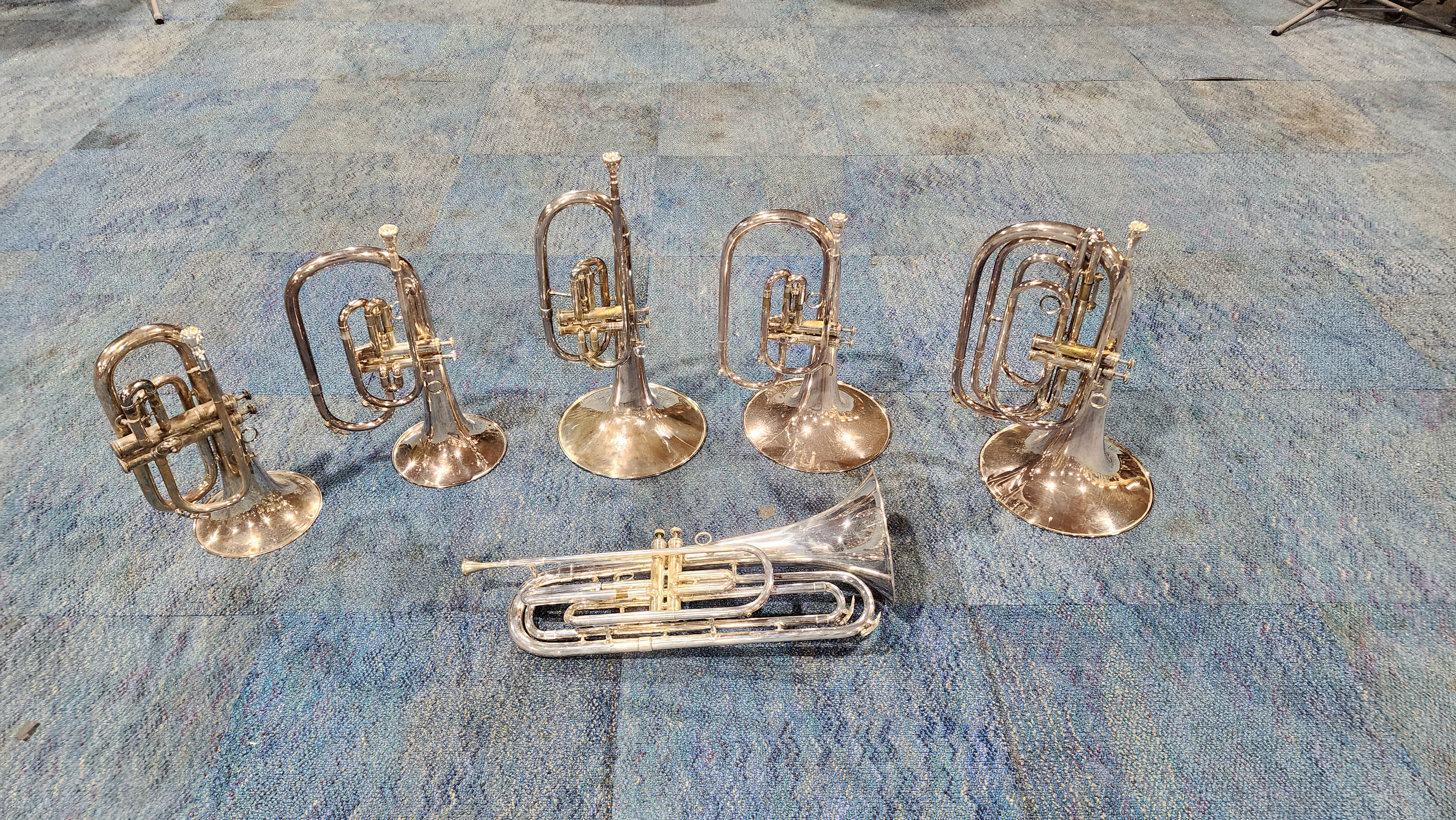

=== Alto voices ===
During the non-chromatic era of drum and bugle corps, the alto voice was unique in that most alto instruments had the same range as soprano voices, therefore alto voice instruments sometimes voice-crossed with sopranos to allow for various tone colors during shows.

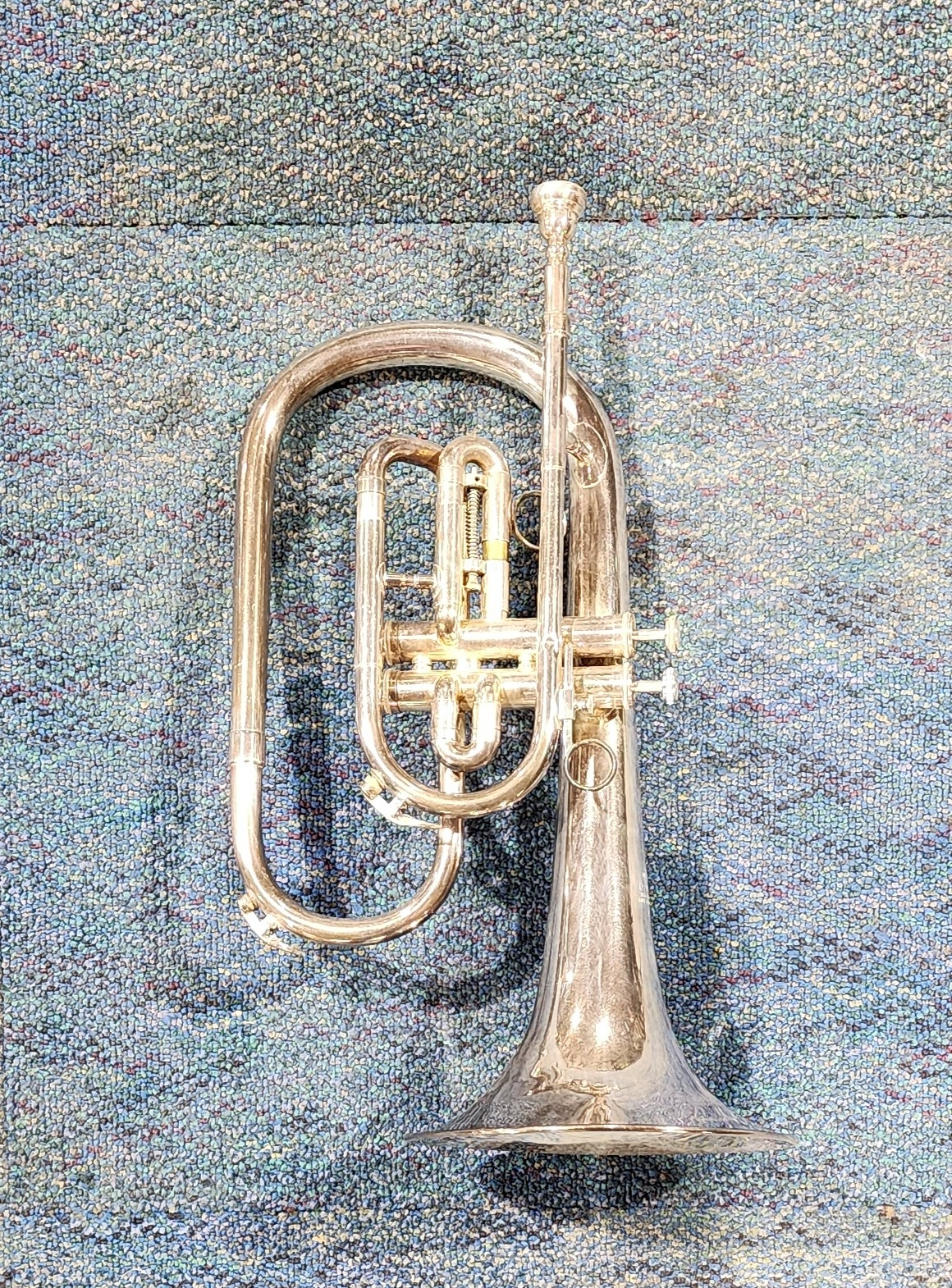

==== Alto bugle ====
The alto bugle is a voice that was created during the two piston era in the 1970s. These instruments were loosely based on the alto horns used in marching bands and brass bands in a bell-front marching configuration. Alto bugles are still manufactured today in a three valve configuration. Bore size for the alto bugle typically ranges from .468"-.470" As an alto voice in G, it has the same bottom end of its range as the soprano family.

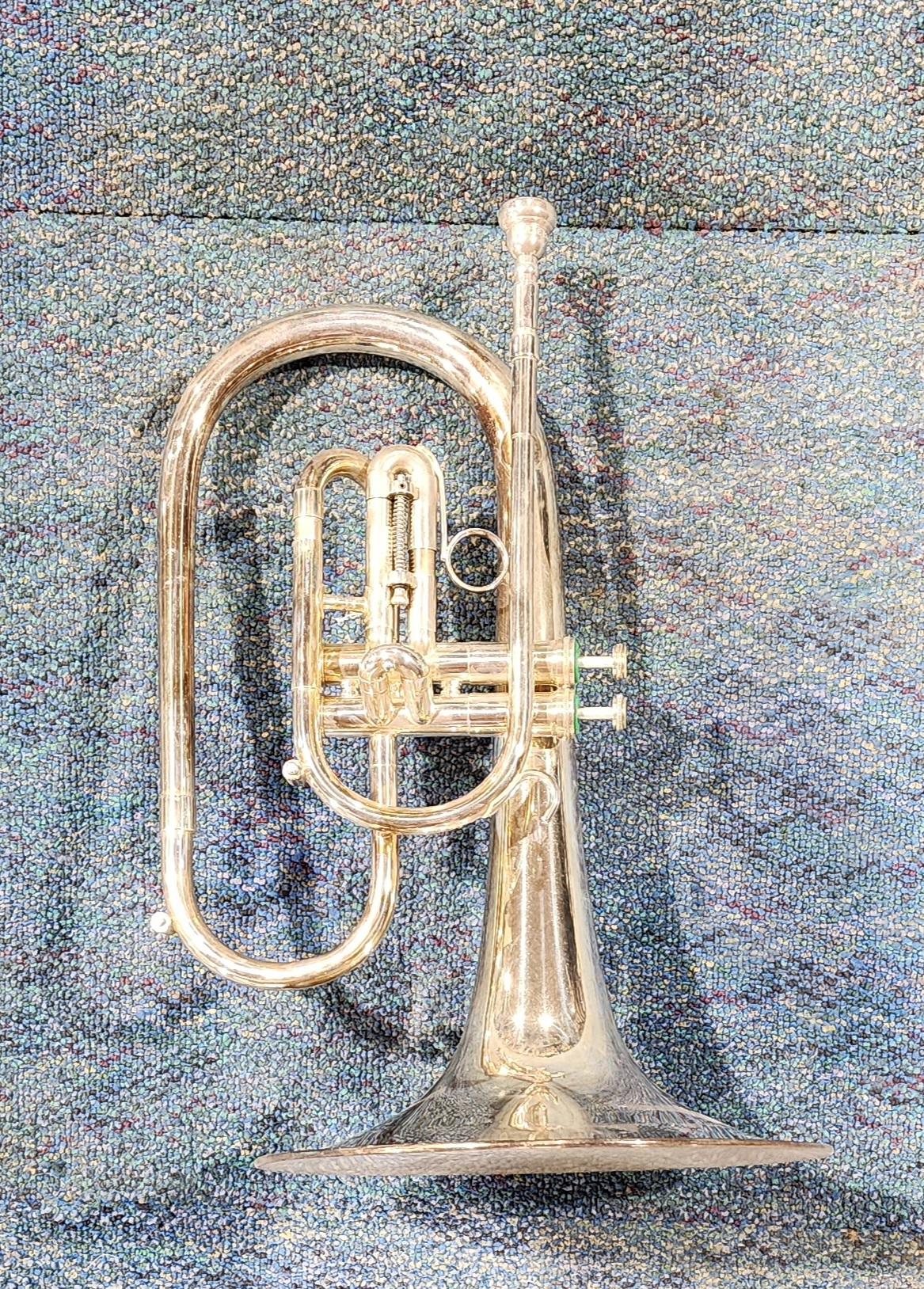

==== Mellophone bugle ====
The mellophone bugle was first introduced in the mid 1960s. These instruments were based on the design of the Conn Mellophonium as used by the Stan Kenton Orchestra. Eventually the wrap of the mellophone was compacted more into a soprano shape, with accommodations made for the much larger bell. The mellophone quickly became a popular alto voice due to its tone quality and ease of playing, especially compared to the French horn bugle. Mellophones were often featured in highly talented corps as voices that often soared above soprano parts at large impact points. The mellophone bugle is still manufactured today in a three valve configuration, and by special order in a two valve configuration for The Commandant's Own. Bore size is typically between .468"-.470"

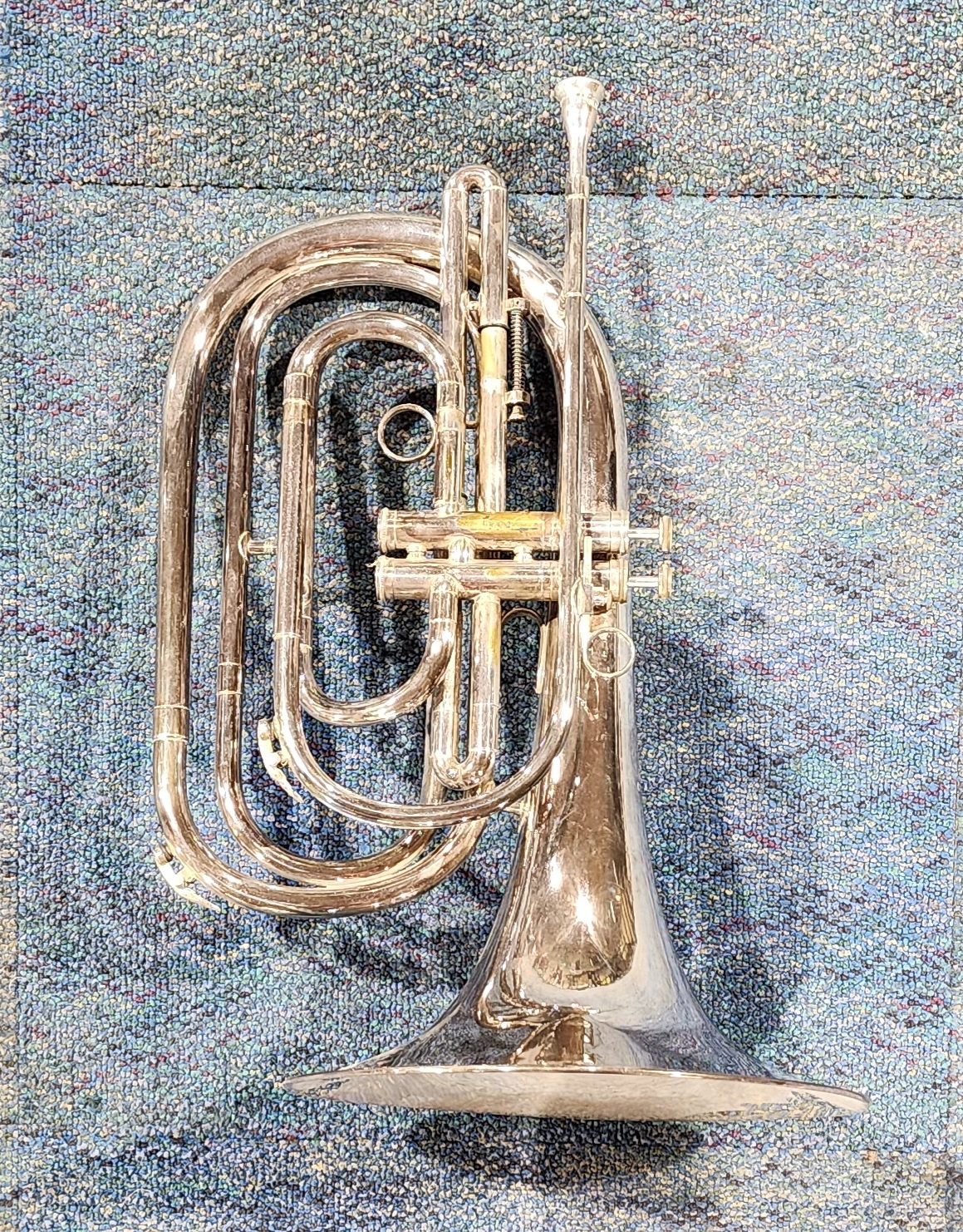

==== French horn bugle ====
The French horn bugle, often called a "Frenchie," was first designed in a G and D single piston configuration in the early 1940s. The Frenchie became popular due to the overtone series allowing many more notes than other bugles could play. The Frenchie followed the design changes of the soprano, including slip-slide configurations, piston/rotor, two piston, and three piston configurations. The Frenchie in a two piston or F/F# piston/rotor configuration was a highly popular instrument as a bridge between baritone and soprano voices due to the near-chromatic nature of the instrument in this range. The French horn bugle is still available in a three valve configuration. The French horn bugle had a typical bore size ranging from .468"-.470"

==== Low alto bugle ====
The low alto bugle was an instrument designed in the 1990s by Zigmant Kanstul. This instrument is nearly identical to a French horn bugle in bore size, bell diameter, and length of tubing, but instead of a French horn mouthpiece receiver, the low alto has an alto horn mouthpiece receiver. The low alto has a range identical to the baritone bugle, but is designed primarily to be played in the middle to upper registers, using its extended length to give a more horn-like sound to the mid voice.

=== Tenor bugle ===
The tenor bugle was a popular voice in drum corps from the 1920s through the 1950s. These instruments were the same bore size and length as a soprano bugle, however they featured a larger bell and could be played with an alto horn mouthpiece. The tenor bugle was designed to play with a more open tone in the lower register of its range and had a tone color closer to a Flugelhorn than a trumpet. The tenor bugle fell out of favor in the 1950s, but was supplanted by the Flugelhorn and alto horn bugles in more modern ensembles.

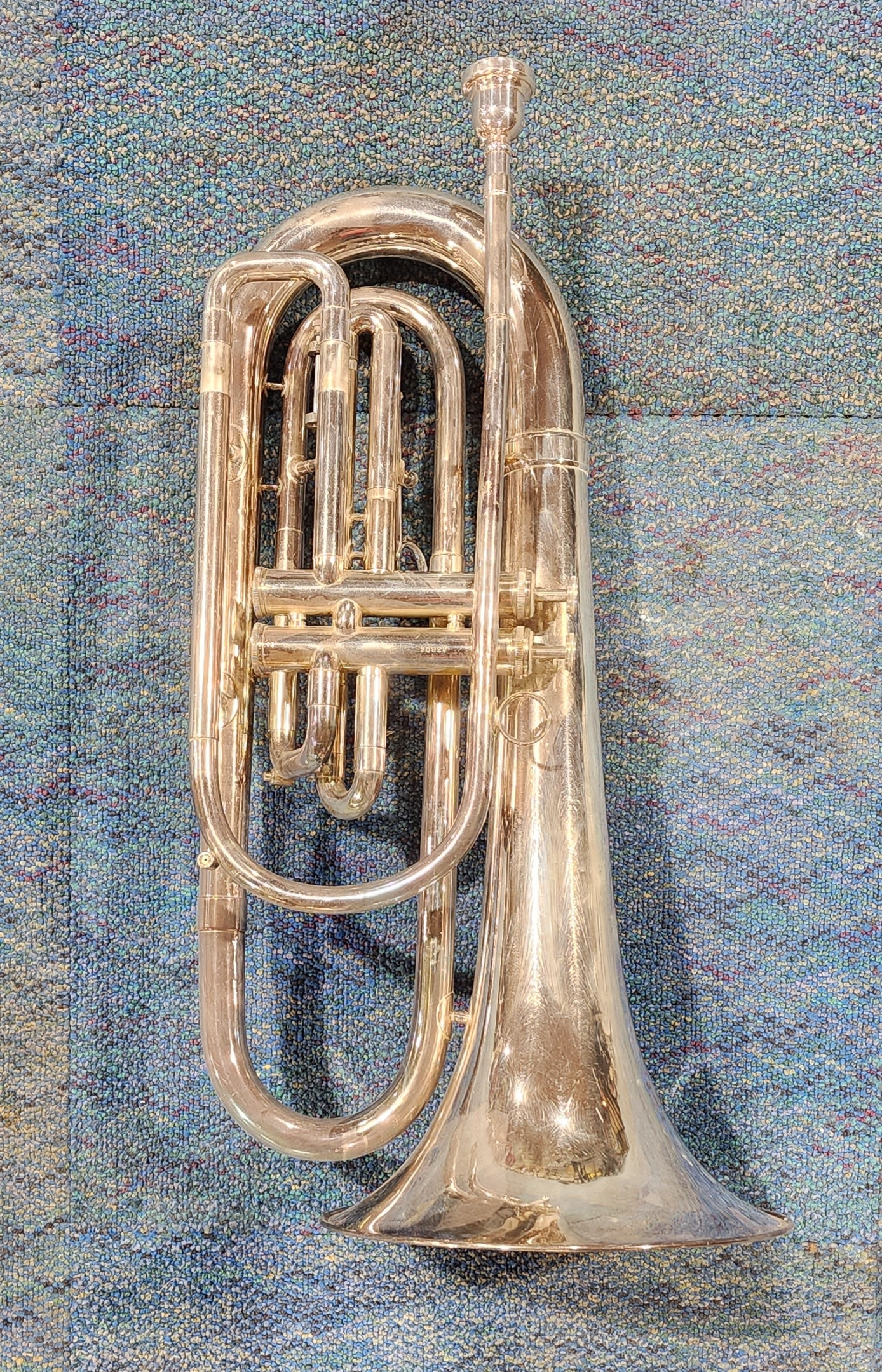

=== Baritone bugle ===
The baritone bugle was the second voice developed for drum and bugle corps after the soprano bugle. The baritone bugle is pitched one octave below the soprano.

==== Baro-tone bugle ====
The first design for the baritone bugle was often referred to as a "Baro-tone" in advertising. These instruments were designed to simply be an octave lower than their soprano counterparts. Often built from bass trumpet and concert French horn parts, these small bore, small bell instruments had difficult intonation and a very poorly balanced tone. Instrument manufacturers eventually replaced these small baritones with the Bass Baritone bugle. The baro-tone came in natural (no valves) and D piston versions with either an F# slip slide, or F or F# rotary valve attachments. Ludwig experimented with a "double piston" version, having a piston actuated rotary valve attached to an overlength F# tuning circuit. The F# length was too long to properly tune F#, and when the slide was pulled out, was too short to properly tune an F.

==== Bass-baritone bugle ====
The bass-baritone bugle was developed in the 1950s to give a broader depth to the low voice in the drum corps. These instruments were designed to imitate the American concert baritone, which itself is a hybrid of a British style baritone and standard Euphonium. The bass-baritone eventually supplanted the baro-tone as the primary baritone voice, and is no longer called a bass-baritone, but simply just a "baritone." The baritone has been made available in single D piston configuration with either a slip slide, F# rotary, F rotary, or E rotary valve, two piston, or three piston. The baritone bugle is still available in both 3 valve or special order 2 valve configurations.

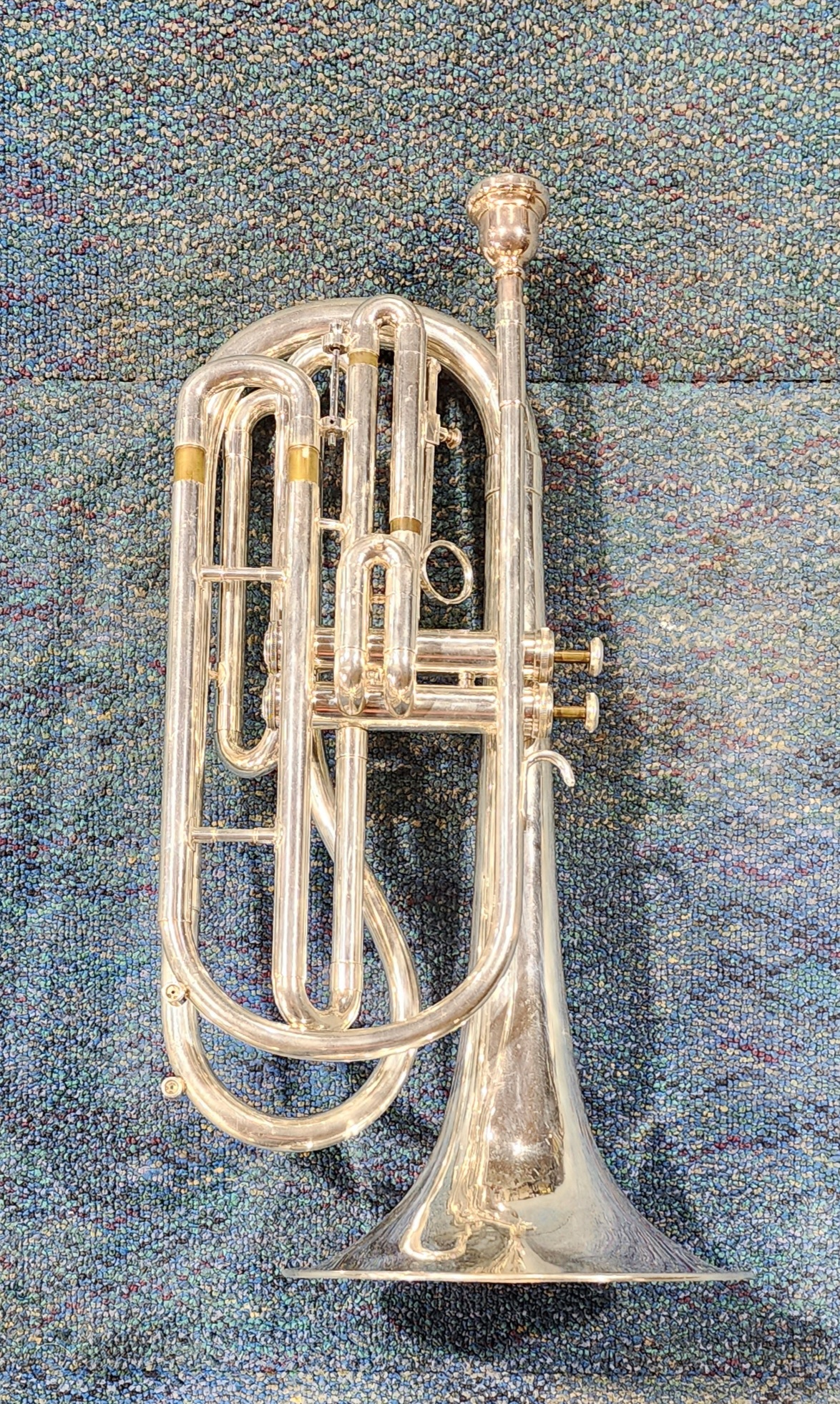

==== Cellophone ====
The Cellophone (pronounced like the stringed instrument Cello + phone) was an instrument prepared by DEG Music Products at the request of the Phantom Regiment Drum and Bugle Corps. The Cellophone is a compact-wrapped baritone bugle with a small bore and bell. The voicing was supposed to resemble more of an orchestral cello than a concert Euphonium. Only a small handful were built. Most examples were two valved, however several export models in a 3 valve configuration were built. The Cellophone's wrap and design later went on to be DEG's Bb marching trombone.

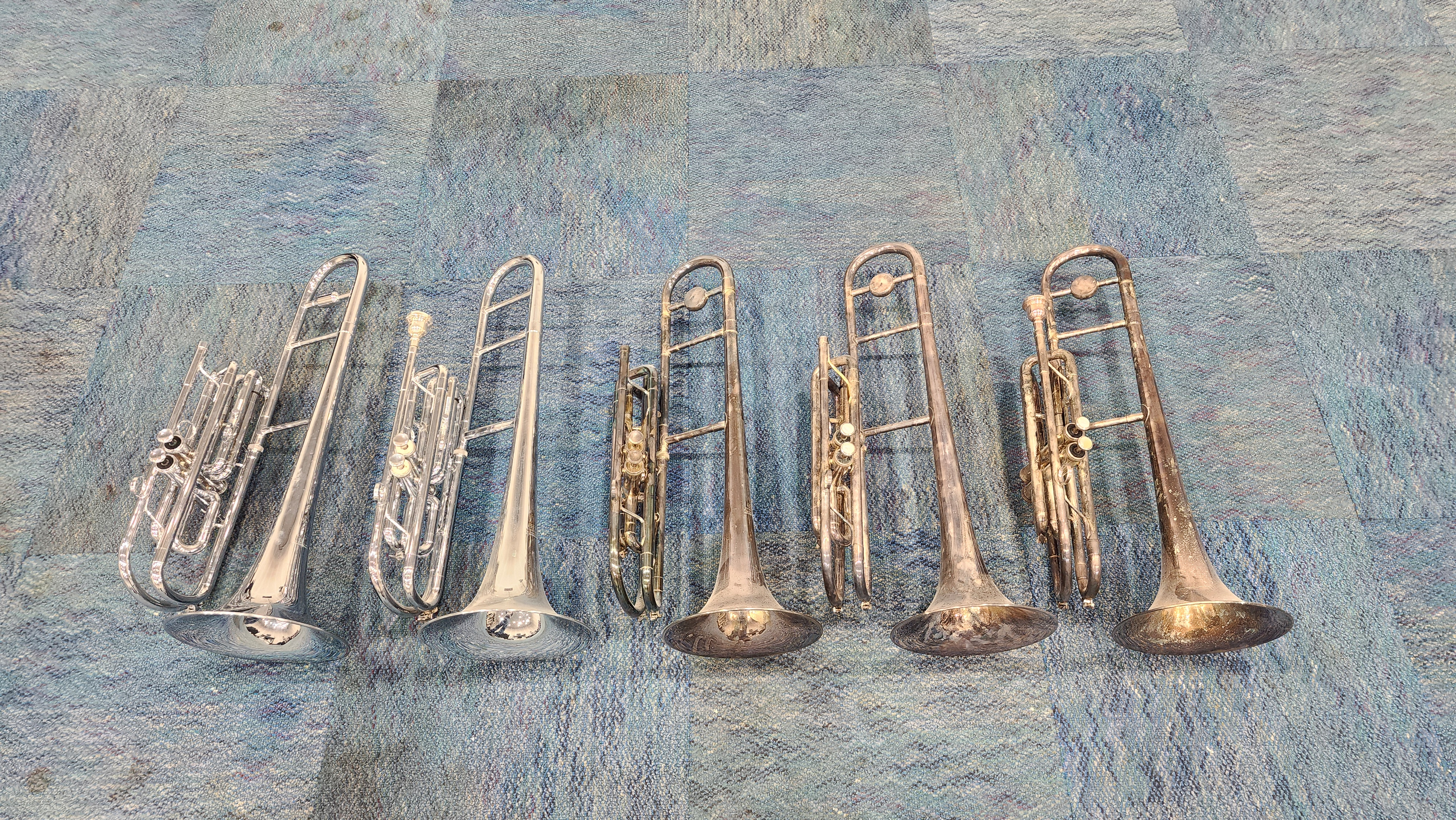

==== Trombonium bugle ====
The trombonium bugle was an instrument prepared by DEG Music Products at the request of the Madison Scouts Drum and Bugle Corps. This is a standard bore baritone bugle with a detachable trombone bell. DCI rules at the time required that the bell must be the most forward part of the instrument, so the trombonium was wrapped in such a way that while the bell rested on the player's shoulder, all valves and tubing did not protrude beyond the bell flare. Several dozen were produced for US corps in a 2 valve configuration. Several three valve models were exported to European drum corps. The trombonium bugle's wrap and design later went on to be DEG's Bb Jazz Bone.

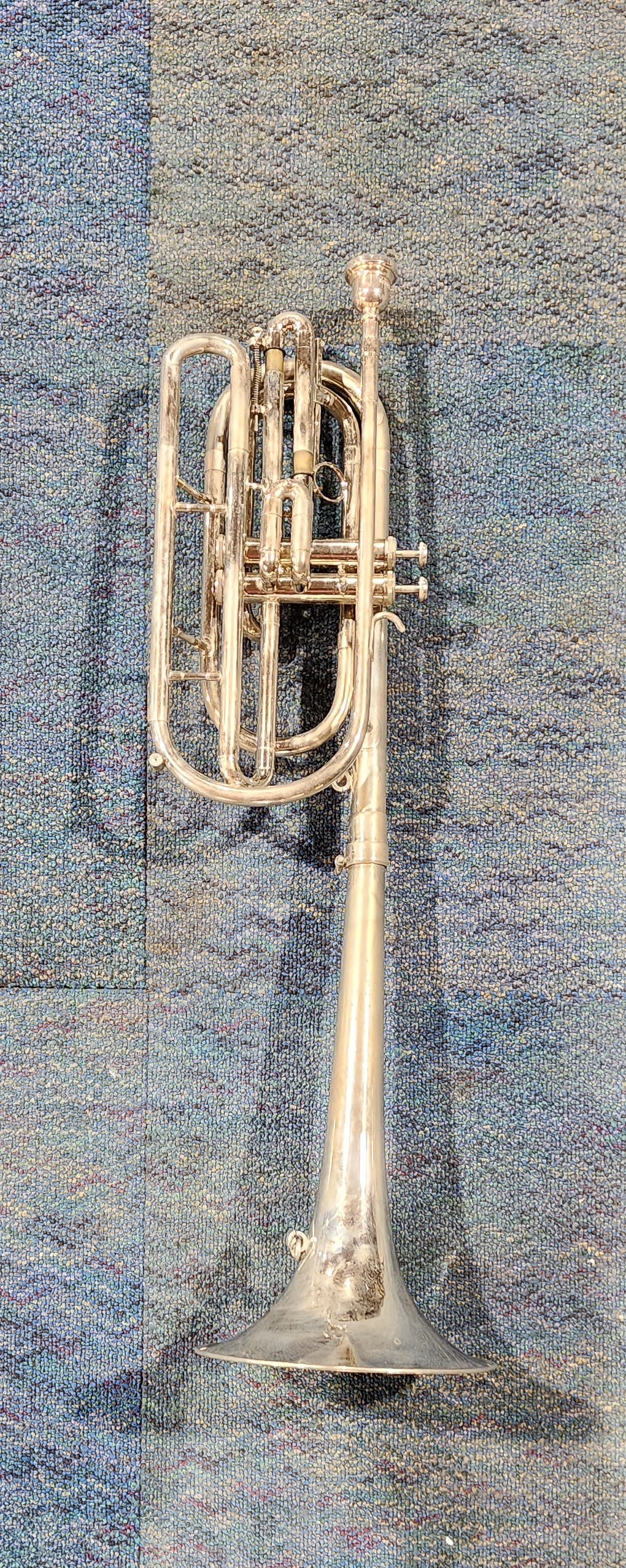

==== Herald baritone bugle ====
The Herald Baritone Bugle was an instrument prepared by DEG Music Products for various special ensembles and corps. This instrument features a standard bore baritone valve section, removable bell, and banner hooks. The herald baritone was only built in a two valve configuration. Kanstul instruments currently builds a G bass herald trumpet as used by Pershing's Own, which is in the same octave range as the herald baritone bugle.

==== Baritone grande bugle ====
The Baritone Grande bugle is a large bore bugle built by the Kanstul Instrument Company. This instrument takes a large shank mouthpiece versus the standard baritone which takes a small shank mouthpiece. Other features include a more open wrap and slightly larger bell to increase the presence of the instrument. The Baritone Grande is still available for purchase in a three valve configuration.

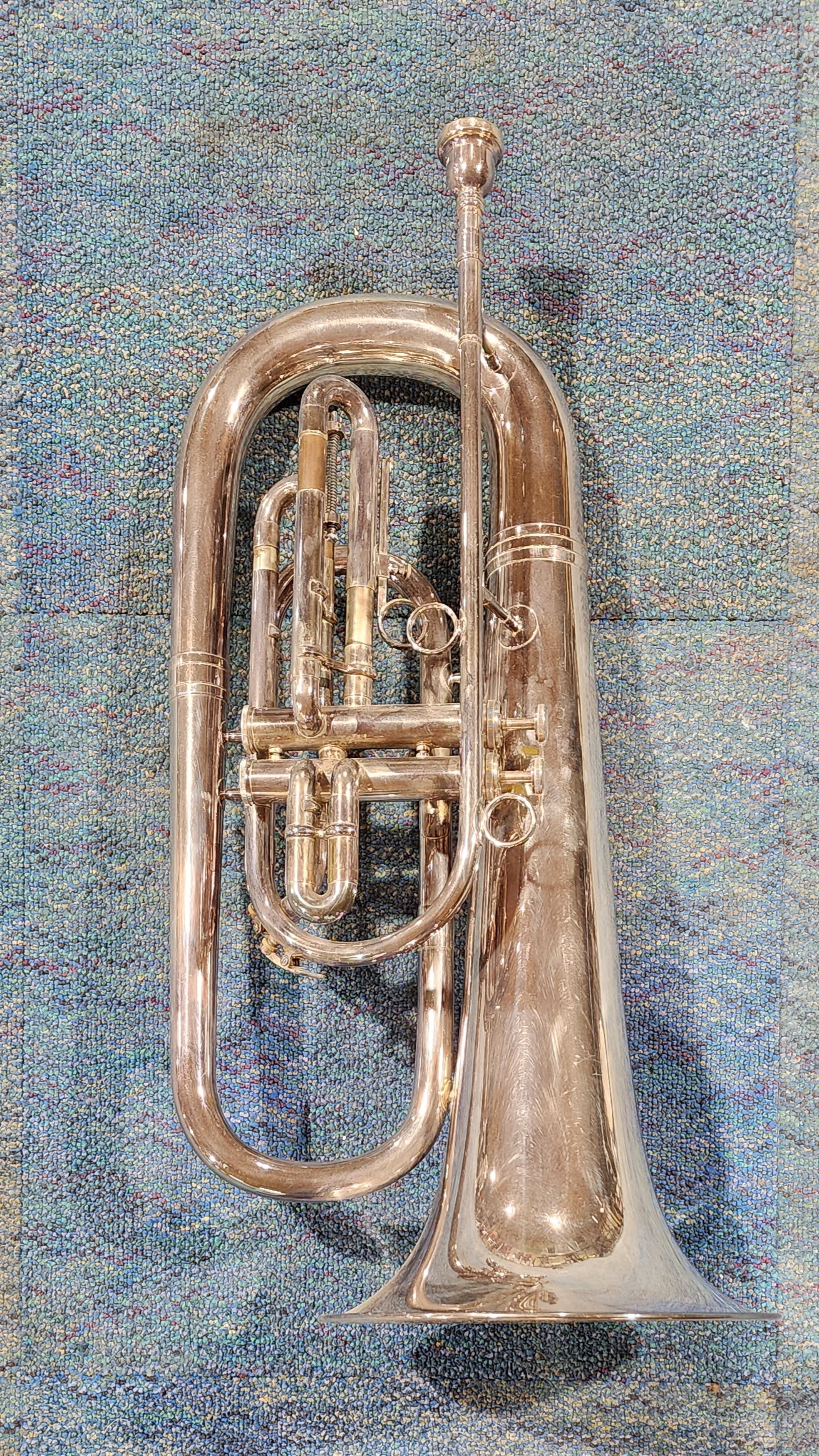

==== Euphonium bugle ====
The Euphonium Bugle has been built since the 1960s in various configurations. The Euphonium was added to the bugle choir around the same time as the mellophone bugle. Euphoniums often feature a larger bore, larger bell throat, and larger bell than the bass-baritone. The Euphonium has been available in D piston configurations with F and F# rotors, F piston and F# rotor configuration, two piston, and three piston configurations. The three valve Euphonium bugle is still available for purchase, along with a special order two piston version. Most Euphonium Bugles accept a large shank mouthpiece, however in the 1980s and early 1990s, DEG Music Products commissioned Willson Brass of Switzerland to design a Euphonium bugle, and their design used a medium shank mouthpiece that is not regularly seen in the United States.

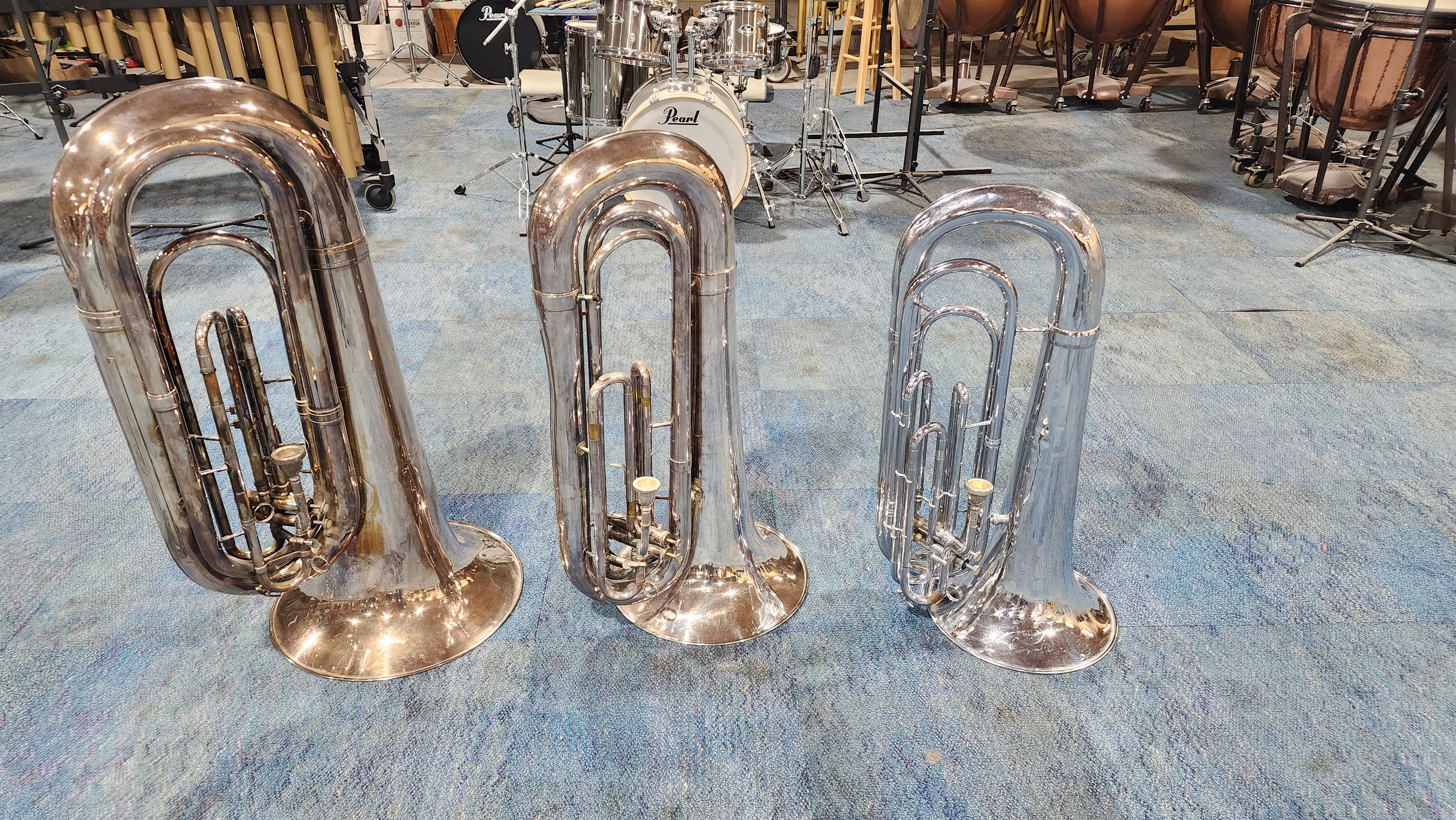

=== Contrabass ===
The contrabass bugle, or "contra", is the bugle equivalent of a marching tuba and its variants (the sousaphone and helicon). This bugle was designed in the 1960s. The original design for a contrabass called for an instrument in CC (the equivalent tubing length of a CC tuba), carried in front of the marcher like the higher voices. This was quickly replaced with a shoulder carried variant a full octave lower than the baritone voice. The first contrabass bugles used the same bore size as the baritone bugle, with double the length of tubing, utilizing a concert Euphonium bell and having a small shank tuba mouthpiece receiver. The combination of the small bell, small bore, and small mouthpiece made slotting notes very difficult. Eventually manufacturers began increasing the size of the contrabass first to the equivalent size of a 3/4 size concert tuba, then to the equivalent of a 4/4 tuba, and finally to the equivalent of a 5/4 tuba. The original small sized contrabass came in D piston or F piston configurations, with F#, F, or E rotary valve tuning slides. The 3/4 sized contrabass came in D or F pistons with either F or F# rotary valves. The 4/4 contrabass came in F piston/F# rotor configuration, two piston, or three piston configuration. The 5/4 contrabass came in two piston, three piston, or four piston configuration. The 4/4 contrabass is still available in a three valve configuration, and has been built in both four piston, and two piston plus an F# rotor special order configurations. The 5/4 contrabass is still available in a three valve configuration, with a four valve configuration as a special order.

The four valve contrabass bugle is the lowest pitched brasswind ever mass produced. Some special order BBBb tubas and sousaphones do exist, but were never built in large quantities. With all four valves depressed, the lowest sounding note on the contrabass bugle is A0, the lowest note on a piano. The pedal note of any contrabass bugle is G0, regardless of the number of valves. A talented musician may be able to play lower than G0 utilizing the pedal range of the bugle, but these notes would be felt more than heard due to the limitations of the human ear.

== Flugabone ==
The Flugabone is a marching Valve trombone, essentially a valve trombone wrapped into a flugelhorn shape for marching. It has the cylindrical bore of a trombone, rather than the conical bore of a flugelhorn or bugle. It has been played famously by Salsa Legends like Willie Colón & Rubén Blades.

== See also ==
- Drum and bugle corps (classic), Drum and bugle corps (modern)
- Brass section
- Brass band
- Fanfare orchestra
