= NZDA =

NZDA may stand for:

- Dargaville Aerodrome, an airport ner Dargaville
- New Zealand Dental Association, a dental association in New Zealand
