= Gordon Cochrane =

Gordon Cochrane may refer to:

- Mickey Cochrane (Gordon Stanley Cochrane, 1903–1962), baseball player and manager
- Gordon Cochrane (RNZAF officer) (1916–1994), officer of the Royal New Zealand Air Force during the World War II
