= Frank Watkins (pilot) =

Royal New Zealand Air Force officer (1922–1942)

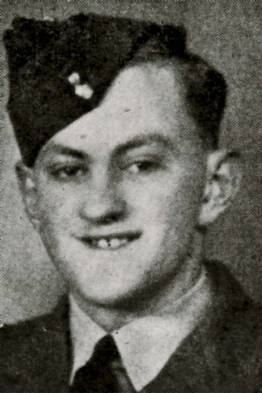
- Frank Watkins c. 1940
- Born: 21 March 1922; Dargaville, New Zealand
- Died: 20 December 1942 (aged 20); Germany
- Burial place: Reichswald Forest Cemetery
- Military career
- Allegiance: New Zealand
- Branch: Royal New Zealand Air Force
- Service years: 1940–1942
- Rank: Pilot Officer
- Units: No. 106 Squadron RAF; No. 150 Squadron RAF; No. 156 Squadron RAF
- Conflicts: Second World War
- Awards: Mentioned in Despatches

Frank Vernon Watkins (21 March 1922 – 20 December 1942) was an officer of the Royal New Zealand Air Force (RNZAF) during the Second World War. He was killed in air operations trying to save a close comrade and for this action was recommended for the Victoria Cross, the highest award for gallantry in the face of the enemy that can be awarded to British and Commonwealth forces.

== Early life ==
Watkins was born in Dargaville, a town in the North Island of New Zealand, but grew up in Ruawai, a small farming community located a few miles away. After completing High School, Watkins moved to Wellington where he worked for the Native Lands Office. Following the outbreak of the Second World War and at the age of 18, Watkins enlisted in Royal New Zealand Air Force on 1 December 1940.

== Second World War ==
Watkins sailed for Britain in June 1941. He was initially posted to No. 106 Squadron RAF where he flew five operations on Manchesters, and one with OTU, and then 21 operations flying Wellingtons with No. 150 Squadron RAF based at Snaith, Yorkshire. Watkins was then chosen for the recently formed pathfinders, joining No. 156 Squadron RAF on 1 December 1942. He was now an experienced and above average captain.

On the evening of 20 December 1942, Watkins was flying his Wellington on a mission headed for Duisburg, in the Ruhr. Flying with Watkins that evening was navigator John Carter, a squadron leader with a Distinguished Flying Cross. In a letter written from Stalag Luft III on 5 January 1943 to the commanding officer of No. 156 Squadron, Tommy Rivett-Carnac, Carter described how they had taken direct flak directly over the target, with the bomb aimer Bill Brook-Norris being severely wounded. Watkins and Brook-Norris had flown together for some time and had become close friends. Carter stated that they had intended to inject the wounded airman with morphine and then launch him from the aircraft by parachute. While preparing for this, the Wellington was hit again and suddenly the aircraft was too low and out of control. The rest of the crew had already jumped when Watkins ordered Carter out and said he was staying. The Wellington crashed shortly afterwards killing both Watkins and Brook-Norris. Watkins and Brook-Norris were found in the crash remains in the target area and now lie together in the Reichswald Forest Cemetery. Watkins was 20 years old.

=== Recommendation for the Victoria Cross ===
In Carter's letter to Rivett-Carnac, he wrote:

Had he not been so devoted to his friend he could have saved his own life by leaving the dying [bomb aimer] to his fate. Yet he refused to do this and attempted the alternative crash landing ... his life was forfeited in the crash ... He willingly and selflessly gave his life in a forlorn effort to save his friend ... his actions were the most outstanding example of ... sacrifice. I am inspired by his memory.

Recommending a Victoria Cross for Watkins, Rivett-Carnac mentioned his unquestionable and unequalled courage in the face of death was considered worthy of the highest award that can be made by the King. It was noted that from the evidence of Carter's letter that Watkins had displayed the highest qualities as a captain of an aircraft. Firstly, he ordered those members of the crew who could be of no further assistance to him to bail out, and then waited until the last moment before he ordered the navigator to bail out, when in his own mind he considered that he would be forced to make a crash landing. It would appear that at no time did the question of his own safety enter Warrant Officer Watkin's mind.

Group Captain Kirkpatrick, Commanding Officer of RAF Station Wyton, added his comments the same day, stating:

I heartily endorse the Squadron Commander's recommendation that the highest award be granted Warrant Officer Watkins. It was clear that he went to his death in an attempt to land knowing full well the heavy odds against his doing so in a badly damaged aircraft, in enemy territory, and at night, but hoping that the Bombardier might after all be alive, and that he might possibly effect a landing and thereby save his comrade's life. This act of unselfish sacrifice, cool devotion to duty and astonishing courage, in my opinion deserves the highest recognition by the award of the Victoria Cross.

The recommendation was sent to the Air Ministry, but because the supporting evidence was insufficient at that time, it was deferred for further investigation when Carter and the rest of the surviving crew were repatriated from prisoner of war camps after the end of the war in Europe. It is not known if the crew were actually interviewed, but Watkins ultimately received only a posthumous Mention in Despatches, published in the London Gazette of 13 June 1946 (with effect from 20 December 1942). At the time, the VC and Mentions were the only military gallantry awards made posthumously.
