= Parore (disambiguation) =

Girella tricuspidata or Paraore is a type of marine fish found around Australia and New Zealand.

Parore is also a Māori personal or family name, and may refer to:

- Adam Parore (born 1971), New Zealand cricketer
- Louis Parore (1888–1953), Māori leader
- Parore Te Awha (?–1887), Māori leader

It may also refer to Te Pā A Parore, a marae and meeting house in Awanui, Northland Region, New Zealand
