= RAF Warboys =

Former RAF station in Cambridgeshire, England

RAF Warboys
- Near Warboys, Cambridgeshire in England
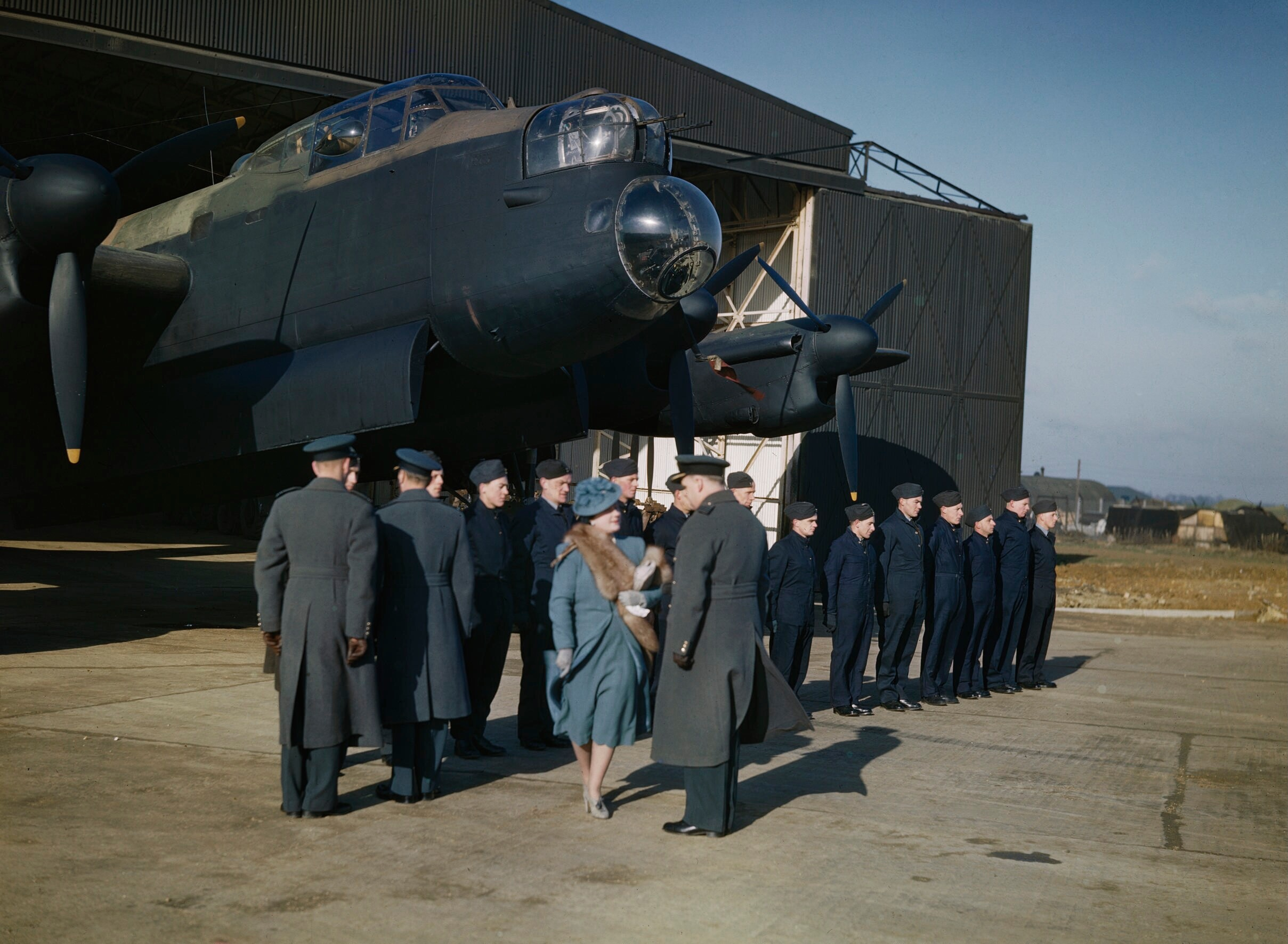
- HM Queen Elizabeth inspects flight and ground crews at RAF Warboys, February 1944, in front of an Avro Lancaster of No. 156 Squadron RAF

Site information
- Type: Royal Air Force Station
- Code: WB
- Owner: Air Ministry
- Operator: Royal Air Force
- Controlled by: RAF Bomber Command * No. 3 Group RAF * No. 8 (PFF) Group RAF

Location
- Shown within Cambridgeshire RAF Warboys (the United Kingdom)
- Coordinates: 52°23′28″N 000°05′59″W

Site history
- Built: 1940
- In use: September 1941 - 1963
- Battles/wars: European theatre of World War II

Airfield information
- Elevation: 90 feet (27 m) AMSL
Runways
| Direction | Length and surface |
|---|---|
| 05/23 | 1,130 metres (3,707 ft) Tarmac |
| 11/29 | 1,830 metres (6,004 ft) Tarmac |
| 16/34 | 1,015 metres (3,330 ft) Tarmac |

Royal Air Force Warboys or more simply RAF Warboys is a former Royal Air Force heavy bomber station, situated just outside the village of Warboys in Huntingdonshire (now Cambridgeshire), England.

== History ==
=== Second World War ===
During the early years of the war, Warboys was a relatively conventional bomber station which was supplemented with the addition of an exceptionally long main runway measuring 6,290 feet (1,920 m). Construction of this runway resulted in the closure of the nearby road to Huntingdon (Church Road) during the war years, necessitating the construction of a bypass road, still in use (2015) as part of the A141. The extension to the runway is still clearly visible, on Google Earth, as crop marks between the old and new roads.

The station was allocated to No.3 Group in August 1942. RAF Warboys became one of the original Pathfinder Force stations.

The construction of Warboys began in 1940. The airfield was built to relieve the congestion at RAF Upwood for the use of No. 17 Operational Training Unit (No. 17 OTU) with Bristol Blenheims. The completion of barbed wire around strategic areas, and three AA gun positions with one Vickers gun, were almost finished by 17 May.

The airfield was ready to use at the end of July 1941, and the first squadron to arrive was a detachment of Short Stirlings from 15 Squadron, arriving from RAF Wyton. The next unit to arrive was 'D' Flight 17 OTU which was based at RAF Upwood and came to Warboys on 15 December. 15 squadron left two days before 17 OTU arrived. The completion of the domestic sites and the new officers' mess and Sergeants' mess were in use about this time. Bad weather held up completion of a lot of the buildings including the Battle Headquarters.

The first fully operational squadron to arrive at Warboys was 156 Squadron on 5 August 1942. The squadron came from RAF Alconbury with Vickers Wellingtons; in the new year it re-equipped with Avro Lancasters. The first RAF unit at Warboys was No. 1507 (Beam Approach Training) Flight RAF for the RAF Bomber Command, equipped with Airspeed Oxfords, but was only at Warboys from 13 March to 17 June 1943. After 1507 (BAT) Flight left, the Stirlings, Lancasters, Handley Page Halifaxes and Oxfords of the Pathfinder Force Navigation Training Unit arrived from RAF Gransden Lodge.

In January 1943, the base converted to Avro Lancaster bombers, which remained at the site until March 1944, when the aircraft were relocated to nearby RAF Upwood. Tests were made on the defence of the base on 31 October 1943 when the Home Guard, from non-local Platoons, attempted to take over the airfield but was unable to do so. The further strengthening of defences was made on 1 March 1944 when No. 2716 Squadron RAF Regiment took over ten Bofors gun sites.

Upwood, which was still having problems with the grass runways, decided to convert to concrete runways, three in total. One of its first squadrons on the new concrete runways was 156 squadron when it left Warboys in March 1944. On 7 March came No. 1655 (Mosquito) Training Unit RAF which had just come from RAF Marham. On 8 March, the A.O.C. of the Pathfinder Force, Air Comm. Bennett arrived to inspect the station and the personnel, The small Warboys airfield was getting very busy when on 6 October nineteen Lancasters of 428 squadron arrived from RAF Middleton St. George after operations over Germany, but by 12 December 1944 1655 (Mosquito) Training Unit left and went to RAF Upper Heyford. On 1 January came a smaller unit, No. 1323 (Automatic Gun Laying Turret) Flight RAF from RAF Bourn.

VE Day, 8 May 1945, saw big changes at RAF Warboys; the first was Navigation Training Unit that disbanded at the end of June 1945 but was replaced on 22 July by 128 Squadron with the re-equipped de Havilland Mosquitos from RAF Wyton. On 28 June arriving from Bourn was No. 1696 (Bomber) Defence Training Flight RAF. 571 Squadron arrived from Oakington on 20 July equipped with Mosquitos. On 23 July the A.O.C. of 8 Group, AVM J.R. Whitley DSO AFC, came to inspect the station for the final time; he was very impressed.

Warboys was coming to an end and it started with 571 Squadron when it disbanded on 20 September 1945; not long to follow was 1696 (Bomber) Defence Training Flight on 28 September and 1323 (AGLT) Flight was two days after that. 128 Squadron left on 8 October for service on the continent. With only a few communications aircraft left the airfield was strangely quiet. On 15 December 1945 Warboys was placed under a care and maintenance basis with its parent station Upwood.

=== Post war ===
Over the following years RAF Warboys reverted to agricultural use. The buildings became derelict and the runways and taxiways were gradually broken up. Bloodhound air-defence missiles of 257 squadron were based at Warboys from 1 July 1960 with the return of the Royal Air Force. No accommodation was provided and the operating crews lived at Upwood, which had enough room. By the end of December 1963 the Bloodhounds had been withdrawn and the Royal Air Force relinquished the airfield for the second and last time.

== Airfield layout and additional buildings ==
Located on the north side of the site was the battle headquarters bunker, defended by a pair of mushroom shaped F.C Construction type pillboxes (also known as Oakington or Fairlop type pillboxes), one of which remains in good condition in 2009.

The airfield's bomb stores were located to the west of the airfield and to the north lay a machine gun butt, used for testing, discharge and alignment of aircraft machine guns.

Domestic, mess and communal sites were dispersed to the south east of the airfield either side of the modern A141 on the borders of the neighbouring village of Old Hurst. At least 11 separate dispersed locations provided maximum accommodation for 1,959 male and 291 female personnel.

== Based units ==
- No. 128 Squadron RAF
- No. 156 Squadron RAF
- No. 257 Squadron RAF
- No. 571 Squadron RAF

== Current use ==
The site was then sold back into private ownership and returned to largely agricultural use, with a small industrial estate developing on the southern corner of the former runways. A small part of the airfield is now used by Ramsey Aero Model Club to fly radio controlled model aircraft.
