= Central Hotel, Dargaville =

Hotel in Dargaville, New Zealand

Central Hotel
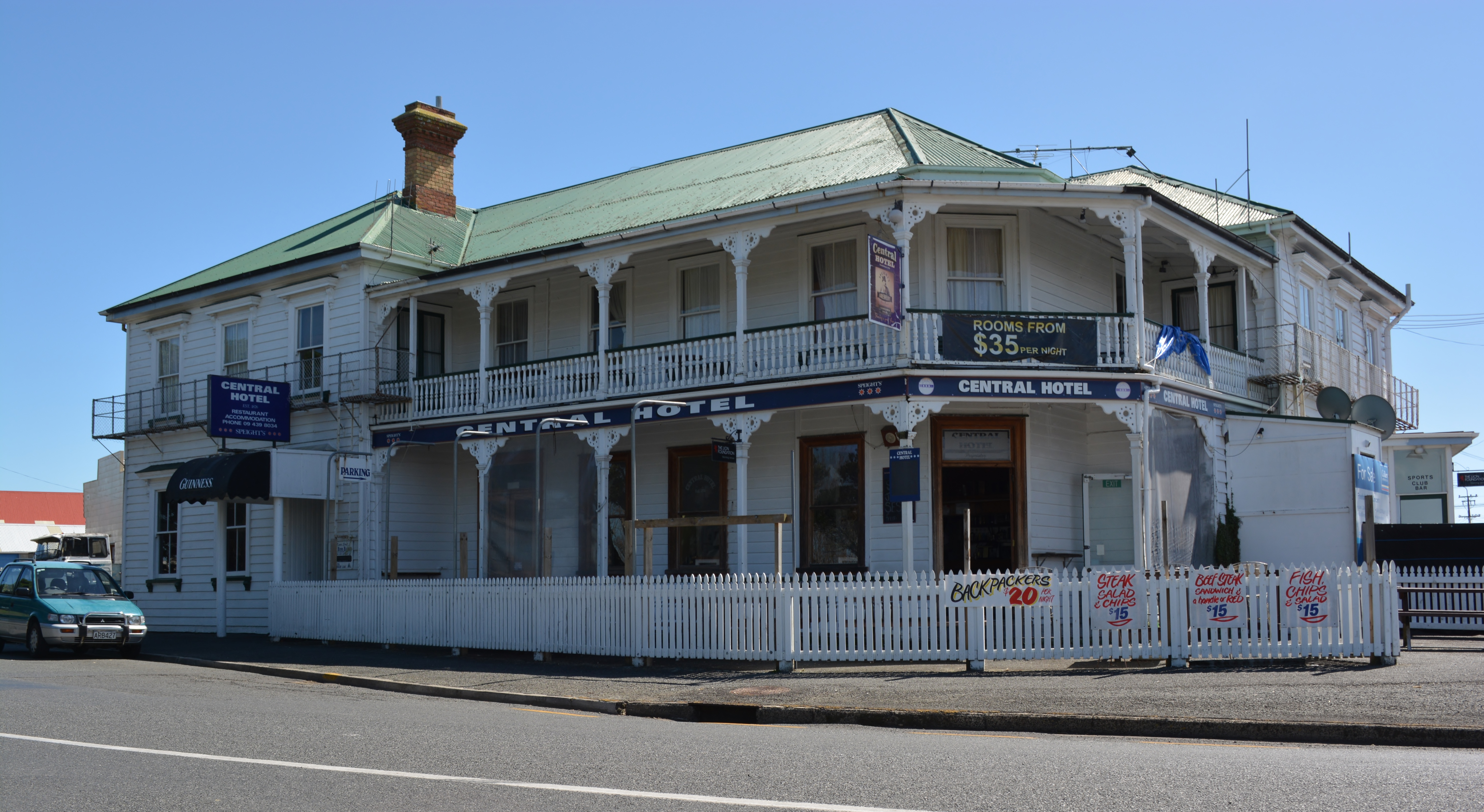
- The Central Hotel, designed by architect John Currie (1901)
- Interactive map of the Central Hotel area

General information
- Architectural style: Edwardian commercial classicism
- Location: 35.9435°S 173.868°E, 18 Victoria Street, Dargaville, New Zealand
- Construction started: 1901
- Completed: 1902

Design and construction
- Architect: John Currie

Heritage New Zealand – Category 2
- Designated: 23 June 1984
- Reference no.: 3825

The Central Hotel in Dargaville, New Zealand, was designed by Auckland-based architect John Currie and was built in 1901. The building is on the Heritage New Zealand Pouhere Taonga List as a Category 2 Historic Place List No:3825; it was registered on 23 June 1984.

== History ==
The first hotel on the site was known as the Kaihu Hotel. It was built in 1874 to cater for the expanding township that was known as Kaihu at the time, and it contained 20 rooms. By 1875, Kaihu had expanded to include wharves, warehouses and several residences, as well as the hotel. In the same year Bishop Cowie came to the Northern Wairoa to perform religious services; with the Kaihu township lacking a place of worship the hotel was used as a venue.

In 1876 the hotel's publican, Joseph Raynes, was charged with a breach of the Auckland Provincial Council Licensing Act 1871, by supplying liquor to several patrons that weren't boarders or guests staying on the premises. In June of that year an attempt was made by the licensing committee to oppose any licence renewal for the hotel. The reasons given were mainly regarding the hotel being frequented by bushmen, gumdiggers and millhands that came to the site for the purpose of getting intoxicated, which had resulted in several drownings. By 1877, the township was renamed Dargaville and the hotel was described as "one of the most comfortable in the province".

By 1878, Dargaville township had expanded to include 60 houses, Edwin Mitchelson's store, two hotels (the second was the Northern Wairoa Hotel), a church, a public hall, and tradesmen's stores. The hotel was extended in 1881 to include a billiard room and other facilities to cater for the expanding population. The building work was done by building contractor William Spiers.

In February 1901, the Kaihu Hotel was destroyed by fire. James Carmody, an aged pensioner, was burned to death inside the building.

Tenders for a new building were advertised the following month by Auckland architect John Currie. By early 1902, the hotel had been completed and renamed the Central Hotel. In 1904, the hotel's licensee Edmund Moriarity appeared in the Dargaville Magistrate's Court on charges of supplying liquor to patron Arthur Trenery when he was drunk. Trenery had been arrested earlier and had died while in police custody. Judgement was reserved at the time. Moriarty was later found guilty of allowing drunkenness in his hotel and fined. The same year in July, the building narrowly escaped being destroyed when a blaze broke out in the hotel's sitting room. The publican was Samuel Walker who had only just taken over the licence when the event occurred.

In mid-1906, the hotel licence was taken over by Philip Cullen. Cullen had formerly held the publican's licence for the Tokatoka Hotel. In February 1908 the licence for the hotel was taken over by HH Dyer. By December 1910, the hotel licence was transferred to Samuel Thompson.
