= Kai Iwi Lakes Reserve =

Nature reserve in New Zealand

Kai Iwi Lakes
- Interactive map of Kai Iwi Lakes
- Location: Taharoa Domain, Northland, New Zealand
- Type: Freshwater dune lakes
- Primary inflows: Rainfall, springs, overland flows
- Basin countries: New Zealand

The Kai Iwi Lakes are located in Taharoa Domain in the Northland region of New Zealand. The reserve encompasses a series of three freshwater dune lakes: Lake Taharoa, Lake Kaiiwi (or Kai Iwi), and Lake Waikare, sometimes called Lake Waikere.

These lakes are recognised for their exceptional water quality and natural state, making them popular destinations for tourism and recreational activities. The lakes, along with Shag Lake to the northwest, are categorised as window dune lakes. This classification indicates that they are situated within the water table and receive water inputs from rainfall, springs, and overland flows. Lake Kai Iwi potentially falls under the category of perched dune lake, residing above the water table.

== Geography and location ==
The Kai Iwi Lakes are situated approximately 35 kilometres northwest of Dargaville, a small town in Northland, New Zealand. Taharoa Domain covers an area of about 538 hectares and is characterized by a combination of sand dunes, native bushland, and the three interconnected lakes. The lakes themselves are unique in their formation, with each one occupying a basin formed by windblown sand.

The catchments surrounding these lakes are predominantly covered by high-producing exotic grassland pasture, exotic pine forests, and manuka/kanuka scrubland. Some areas have a mixture of different vegetation covers. The lakes' surface areas, catchment areas (including the lakes), and volumes are as follows: Kai Iwi – 22.6 hectares, 120.9 hectares, and 1.43 million cubic metres; Taharoa – 197 hectares, 439.4 hectares, and 25.18 million cubic metres; Waikare – 26.5 hectares, 149.5 hectares, and 2.97 million cubic metres.

During the warmer months, each of the lakes experiences thermal stratification. According to the National Policy Statement for Freshwater Management, the phytoplankton (chlorophyll-a) status for each lake is as follows: Kai Iwi teeters between states A and B, leaning more toward state B; Taharoa generally remains in state A, occasionally entering state B during small periodic events and returning to state A afterward; Waikare is more similar to Kai Iwi than Taharoa, occasionally crossing into or verging on state C and recently favouring state B.

Nitrogen levels in Lake Kai Iwi have occasionally reached state C, but they tend to revert back to state B. Taharoa generally maintains a high state A for nitrogen, while Waikare consistently remains in state B. Phosphorus and toxic ammonia levels for each lake are categorized as state A.

Kai Iwi has historically been classified as low mesotrophic and has recently improved, entering the oligotrophic range. Taharoa is categorized as low oligotrophic (indicating good water quality) and can reach the microtrophic range (very good water quality). Lake Waikare is considered medium oligotrophic (also indicating good water quality).

There is limited climate data for the Kai Iwi lakes but estimates can be made from nearby climate stations. The average air temperature in Dargaville is 15.3°C, ranging from 11.3°C in July to 19.8°C in February. There is unlikely to be much difference in air temperature between Kai iwi Lakes and Dargaville. DOC (2011) reported the average annual rainfall at the Maitahi Wetland Scientific Reserve, just south of the Kai Iwi Lakes is about 1500 mm. This and recent rainfall data near Kai Iwi Lakes, suggests that average annual rainfall at Kai Iwi lakes is about 1,400 mm with the driest months being November to February and the wettest months being June and July. This is consistent with historical rainfall data from Kai Iwi lakes. Historical average annual rainfall for Kai iwi Lakes includes 1,297 mm based on an 18 year record at Fanning rainfall station (McLellan 1985) and 1,226 mm at McLeods at Kai Iwi based on data from 1986 to 1993. Average annual open water evaporation in Dargaville is 1,018 mm, with the highest evaporation rates in December and January and the lowest in June and July.

== Lakes ==
=== Lake Taharoa ===
Lake Taharoa
- Location within Northland Region
- Location: Northland Region, North Island
- Coordinates: 35.8094°S 173.6461°E
- Type: Dune Lake
- Catchment area: 441.7 ha (1,091 acres)
- Basin countries: New Zealand
- Surface area: 197.7 ha (489 acres)
- Average depth: 16.42 m (53.9 ft)
- Max. depth: 31.81 m (104.4 ft)
- Residence time: 11.247 years

The largest and deepest of the three lakes, Lake Taharoa is a freshwater dune lake that stretches across approximately 57 hectares. It is near Ripiro Beach; there is also a lake of the same name in the Waikato region. In Māori, taharoa means "long coast" (taha = coast, roa = long).

It is a popular spot for swimming, kayaking, and water sports. Lake Taharoa exhibits complex bathymetry, featuring a deep central basin of 38.8 metres connected to two shallower basins, as well as a discrete nearly closed basin at its western end and some gently sloping beaches. The presence of numerous steep drop-offs limits the development of a littoral fringe with emergent plants. The mean depth of Lake Taharoa is 16.42 metres. Lake Taharoa has been recognised as ‘probably the best example of a clear-water lake in Northland with the deepest recorded (24m) submerged vegetation in Northland’. Lake Taharoa is one of the largest and deepest dune lakes in New Zealand, it also has some of the deepest recorded submerged vegetation (to a depth of 24 metres) of any North Island lake.

Lake Taharoa is a popular recreation area. It is used for boating, swimming, camping and there is a walking track around the perimeter of the lake.

=== Lake Kaiiwi ===
Lake Kaiiwi
- Interactive map of Lake Kaiiwi
- Location: Northland Region, North Island
- Coordinates: 35.8148°S 173.6540°E
- Type: Dune lake
- Primary inflows: Lake Taharoa (minor inflows) and minor drain at south end of the lake
- Primary outflows: None
- Basin countries: New Zealand
- Max. length: 865 m (2,838 ft)
- Max. width: 410 m (1,350 ft)
- Surface area: 22.6 ha (56 acres)
- Max. depth: 16 m (52 ft)

Lake Kaiiwi is located to the northwest of Dargaville. The lake has no outflow, with only minor drain inflows in the south of the lake and from the larger Lake Taharoa. It has a maximum depth of 15.65 metres and an average depth of 8.15 metres. The lake margin is vegetated by scrub (70%) and pine plantation (30%), with pasture in the larger catchment. The northeastern area of the lake is characterized by dense emergent plant growth, which plays a significant role in filtering nutrients from the catchment area.

Lake Kaiiwi was named after chief Te Kaiiwi, the first person to visit the lake. It is the scene of the Battle of Lake Kaiiwi.

=== Lake Waikare ===
The smallest of the three lakes, Lake Waikare (35.798460°S 173.630455°E) is a dune lake that covers approximately 8 hectares. It is separated from Lake Taharoa and Lake Kai Iwi by sand dunes and can be accessed via a short walk. Lake Waikare consists of three basins, with the central basin being the deepest at 29.48 metres and an average depth of 10.95 metres across the lake. The shoreline of Lake Waikare undulates, with steep drop-offs on the western side and more gradual slopes on the eastern side of each arm. The eastern edges of the lake are more favorable for the growth of littoral emergent plant communities.

== Activities and facilities ==
The lakes' clear waters and sandy beaches are popular for swimming and cooling off during the summer months. Visitors engage in water sports such as kayaking, paddleboarding, boating, and water skiing on Lake Taharoa. Fishing enthusiasts catch freshwater species such as rainbow trout, brown trout, and perch in the lakes. The reserve features several walking tracks and trails that wind through the surrounding forests, offering scenic views and opportunities for birdwatching. There are campsites and designated picnic areas with facilities, including BBQ pits and picnic tables. Visitors explore the native bushland, observe birdlife, and view the natural beauty of the area.

== See also ==
- List of lakes in New Zealand
