= No. 156 Squadron RAF =

Defunct flying squadron of the Royal Air Force

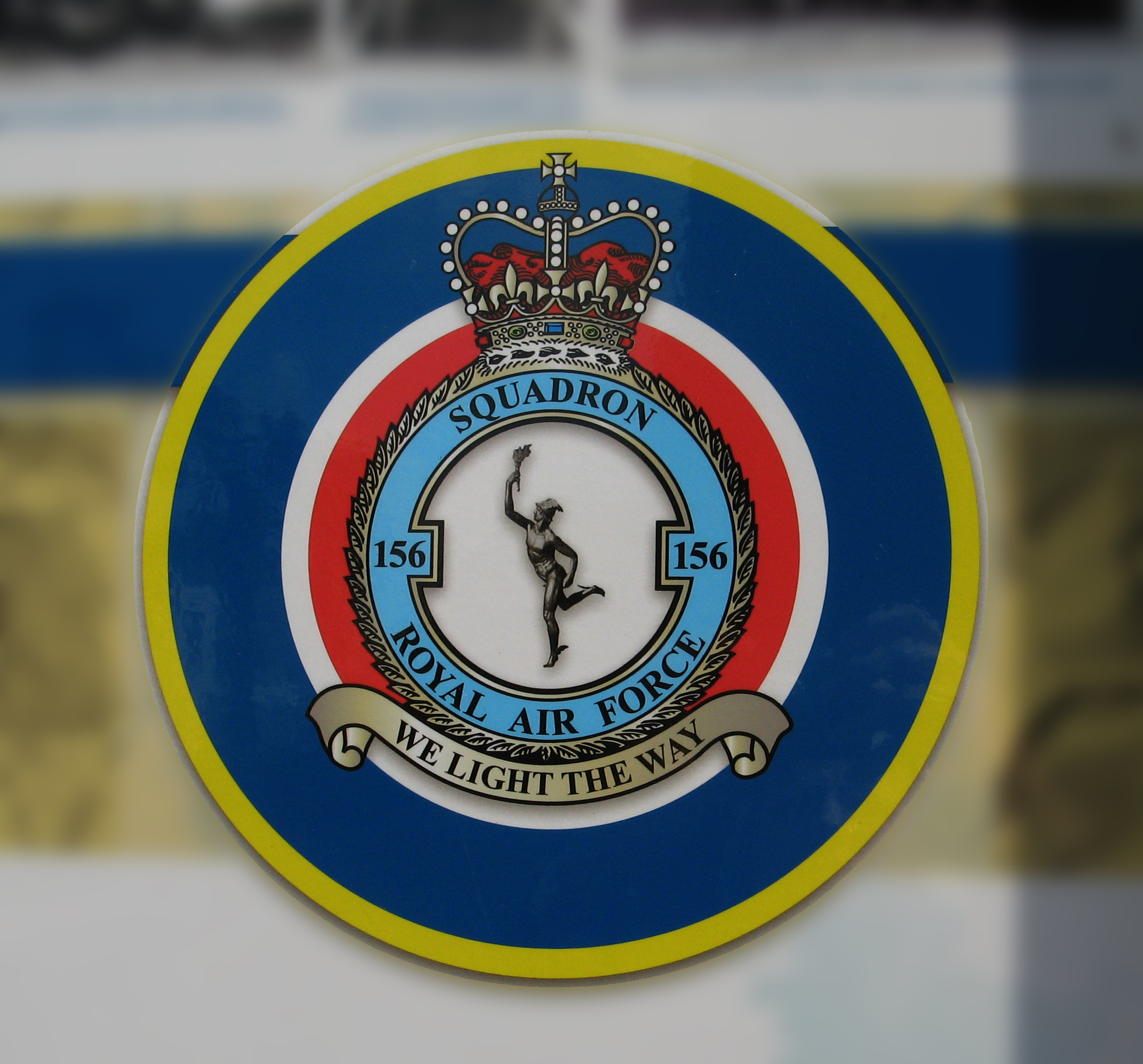
- Active: 12 October 1918 – 9 December 1918; 14 February 1942 – 25 September 1945
- Country: United Kingdom
- Branch: Royal Air Force
- Part of: No. 3 Group RAF, Bomber Command (Feb 42-Aug 42); No. 8 Group RAF, Bomber Command (Aug 42-Sep 45)
- Motto: We light the way

Insignia
- Squadron Badge heraldry: A figure of Mercury holding a torch
- Squadron Codes: GT (Feb 1942 - Sep 1945)

No. 156 Squadron RAF was a Royal Air Force Squadron that was active as a bomber unit in World War II.

== History ==
=== Formation and World War I ===
No. 156 Squadron Royal Air Force was first formed on 12 October 1918 at RAF Wyton and equipped with DH 9 aircraft, but was disbanded on 9 December 1918 without becoming operational.

=== Reformation in World War II ===
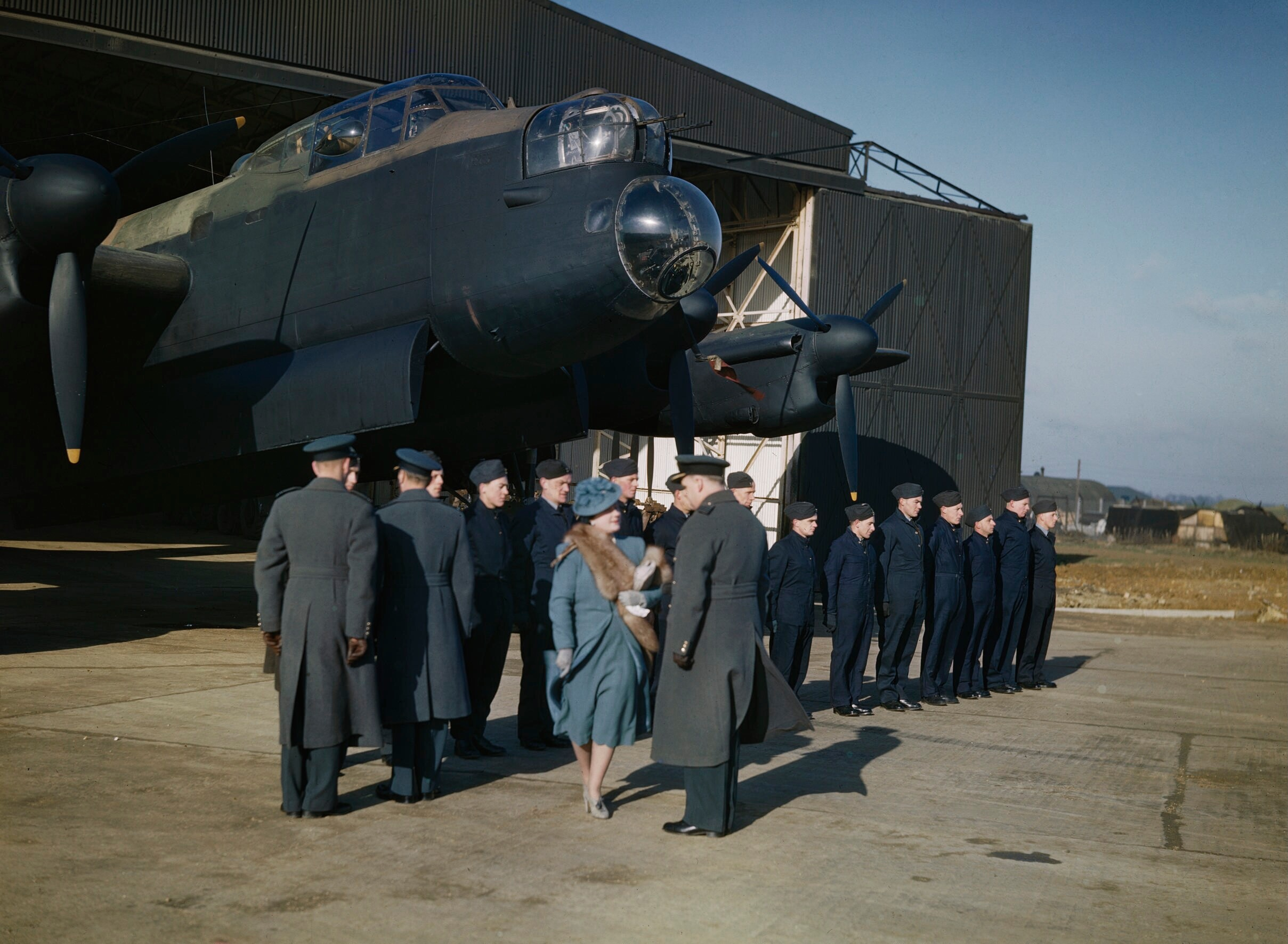
Queen Elizabeth (later the Queen Mother) inspects flight and ground crews at RAF Warboys, February 1944, in front of an Avro Lancaster of No. 156 Squadron

No. 156 Squadron reformed in February 1942 from the home echelon of 40 Squadron at RAF Alconbury, in the Huntingdonshire area of Cambridgeshire, as part of No. 3 Group RAF and was equipped with Wellingtons. In August 1942 it joined No. 8 Group RAF it became one of the original pathfinder squadrons, converting to Lancasters in January 1943. It continued in the pathfinder role until the end of the war, being based at RAF Warboys, RAF Upwood and finally its original founding base, RAF Wyton, where it disbanded on 25 September 1945. The Jamaican airman Billy Strachan, who would go onto become a pioneer of Black civil rights in Britain, once served as an air gunner with the squadron.

== Notable pilots ==
- Gordon Cochrane
- Peter Isaacson
- Frank Watkins
- Pilot Officer Colin Kirkus - lost without trace 13/14 September 1942 on a mission to Bremen in Vickers Wellington BJ879.
- Billy Strachan - famous for surviving 33 missions during a time when the average life expectancy for an RAF crew was 7 operations.

== Memorials ==
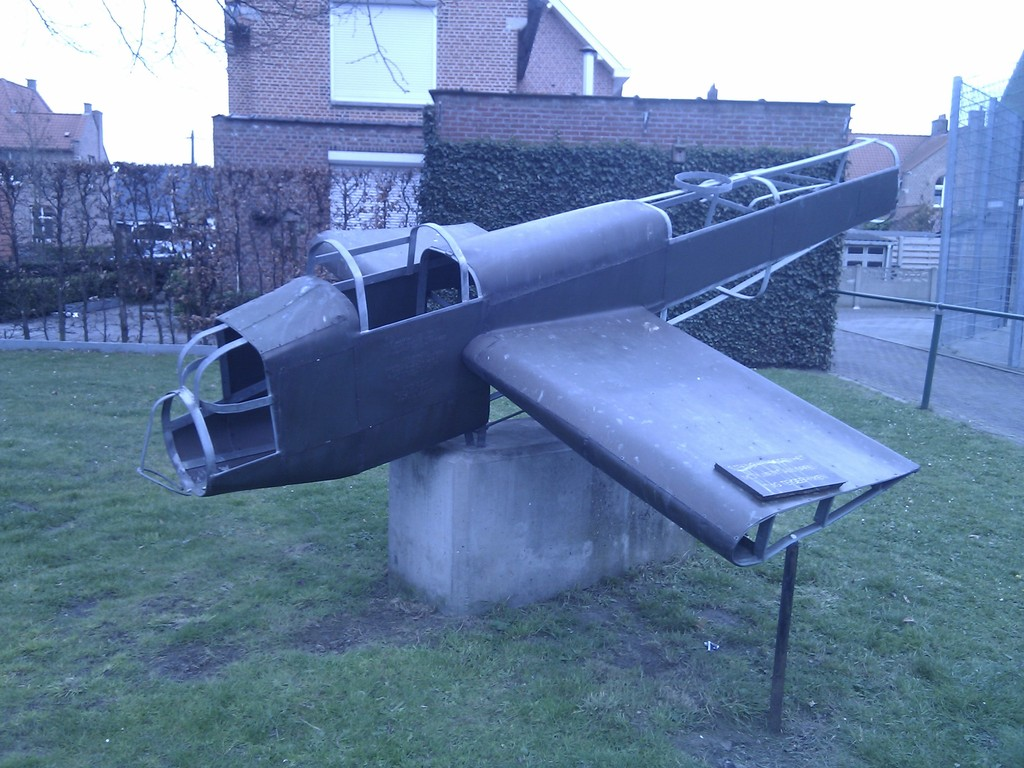
Memorial to ED840, Lier, Belgium

There is a memorial to the crash of Avro Lancaster ED840, 156 Squadron, which crashed in the town in Lier, Belgium on 17 June 1943. It was on a mission to Cologne when it was shot down by anti-aircraft fire. In the Netherlands is a memorial for the Avro Lancaster ND559 crew. The crew was on 22 May 1944, on a mission to Duisburg. On the way back the plane was shot down above Molenaarsgraaf and Brandwijk.

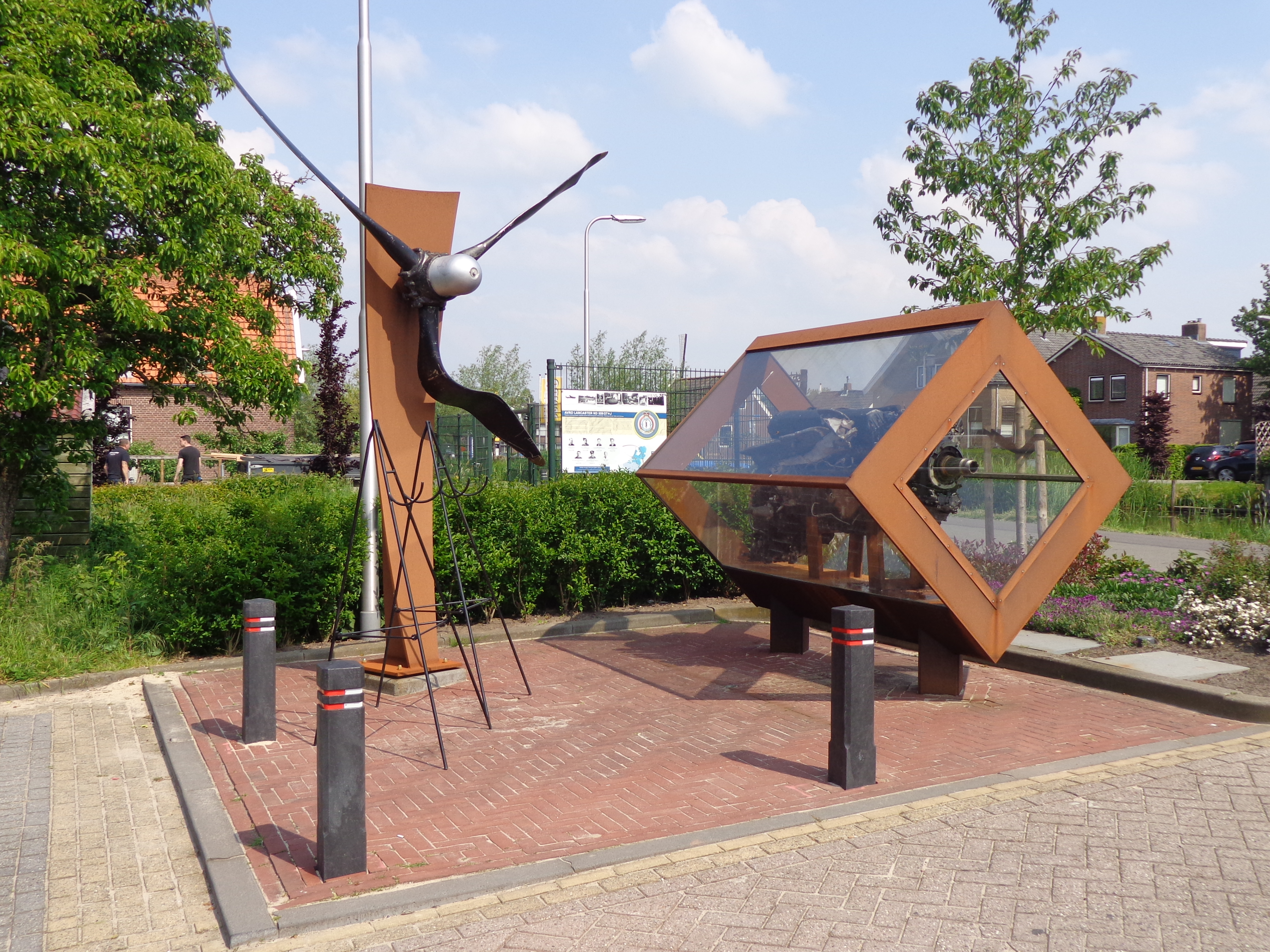
Lancaster ND-559 Monument Brandwijk, the Netherlands

== Aircraft operated ==
Aircraft operated by No. 156 Squadron RAF
From	To	Aircraft	Variant
November 1918	November 1918	Airco DH.9	A
February 1942	January 1943	Vickers Wellington	Mk.Ic
March 1942	January 1943	Vickers Wellington	Mk.III
January 1943	September 1945	Avro Lancaster	Mks.B.I & B.III

== Squadron bases ==
Bases and airfields used by No. 156 Squadron RAF
From	To	Base	Remarks
12 October 1918	9 December 1918	RAF Wyton, Cambridgeshire	Formed here
14 February 1942	15 August 1942	RAF Alconbury, Cambridgeshire	No. 3 Group RAF
15 August 1942	5 March 1944	RAF Warboys, Cambridgeshire	No. 8 Group RAF
5 March 1944	27 June 1945	RAF Upwood, Cambridgeshire	
27 June 1945	25 September 1945	RAF Wyton, Cambridgeshire	Disbanded here

== Commanding officers ==
Officers commanding No. 156 squadron RAF
From	To	Name	Remark
14 February 1942	30 May 1942	W/Cdr. P.G.R. Heath	KIA
30 May 1942	29 July 1942	W/Cdr. H.L. Price	KIA
30 July 1942	28 October 1942	W/Cdr. R.N. Cook	
28 October 1942	8 June 1943	W/Cdr. T.S. Rivett-Carnac, DFC	
17 January 1943	13 February 1943	S/Ldr. S.G. Hookway, DFC (acting)	KIA
8 June 1943	22 January 1944	G/Cpt. R.W.P. Collings, AFC	
22 January 1944	27 April 1944	W/Cdr. E.C. Eaton, DFC	KIA
28 April 1944	7 May 1944	S/Ldr. T.W.G. Godfrey (acting)	
7 May 1944	21 November 1944	W/Cdr. T.L. Bingham-Hall, DFC	
21 November 1944	30 December 1944	W/Cdr. D.B. Falconer, DFC, AFC	KIA
30 December 1944	10 April 1945	W/Cdr. T.E. Ison DSO, DFC	
10 April 1945	25 September 1945	W/Cdr. A.J.L. Craig	
