= Shag Lake =

Lake in New Zealand

- Location within Northland Region
- Location: Northland Region, North Island
- Coordinates: 35.7911341°S 173.6075693°E
- Basin countries: New Zealand

Shag Lake is a dune lake in the Northland Region of New Zealand. It is near the three Kai Iwi Lakes and close to the coast of the Tasman Sea, about 20 km south of Waipoua Forest.

== See also ==
- List of lakes in New Zealand
