= 42 Engineer Regiment (Geographic) =

- Active: 1947 - Present
- Country: United Kingdom
- Branch: British Army
- Role: Geographic support
- Size: 4 squadrons 433 personnel
- Garrison/HQ: RAF Wyton, Cambridgeshire
- Engagements: War in Afghanistan; Iraq War

42 Engineer Regiment (Geographic) is a Royal Engineers regiment of the British Army. The regiment, formed originally in 1947, provides field deployable geographic services, including geodetic survey, terrain analysis, information management and dissemination and geospatial intelligence (GEOINT).

== Organisation ==
Today the regiment consists of:

- 42 Engineer Regiment, in Wyton
  - 13 Geographic Squadron
  - 14 Geographic Squadron
  - 16 Geographic Support Squadron
  - 135 Geographic Squadron

== History ==
In February 1947 a cadre of 19 Topographic Squadron RE moved to Egypt and was initially titled as 19 Field Survey Regiment. It later was renamed as 42 Survey Engineer Regiment on 31 August 1948 and was based near RAF Fayid. In 1948, 13 Field Survey Squadron was posted to Egypt and its personnel were absorbed into the regiment. 13 Squadron was assigned the role of map production which remains its core duties to this day. 14 Field Survey Squadron remained in Germany after the Second World War, and provided geographic support to the British Army on the Rhine. This squadron deployed to Northern Ireland in 1973 as an infantry unit and in 1995, the Squadron moved to Ayrshire Barracks, Mönchengladbach before it was eventually reunited with the regiment in July 2013. The engineers lived in Denison Barracks in Hermitage for many years until July 2014 when the regiment in moved to RAF Wyton as part of the Joint Forces Intelligence Group.

The regiment operates the Tactical Information and Geospatial Intelligence Systems (TIGAS) vehicle system as part of the Field Deployable GEOINT (FDG) capability.

On 10 November 2021 the regiment won Best Security, Defence or Law Enforcement IT Project of the Year at the UK IT Industry Awards.

== Freedoms ==
- (England) 1997: Newbury, Berkshire.
- (England) 3 July 2018: St Ives, Cambridgeshire.
