= Dargaville Aerodrome =

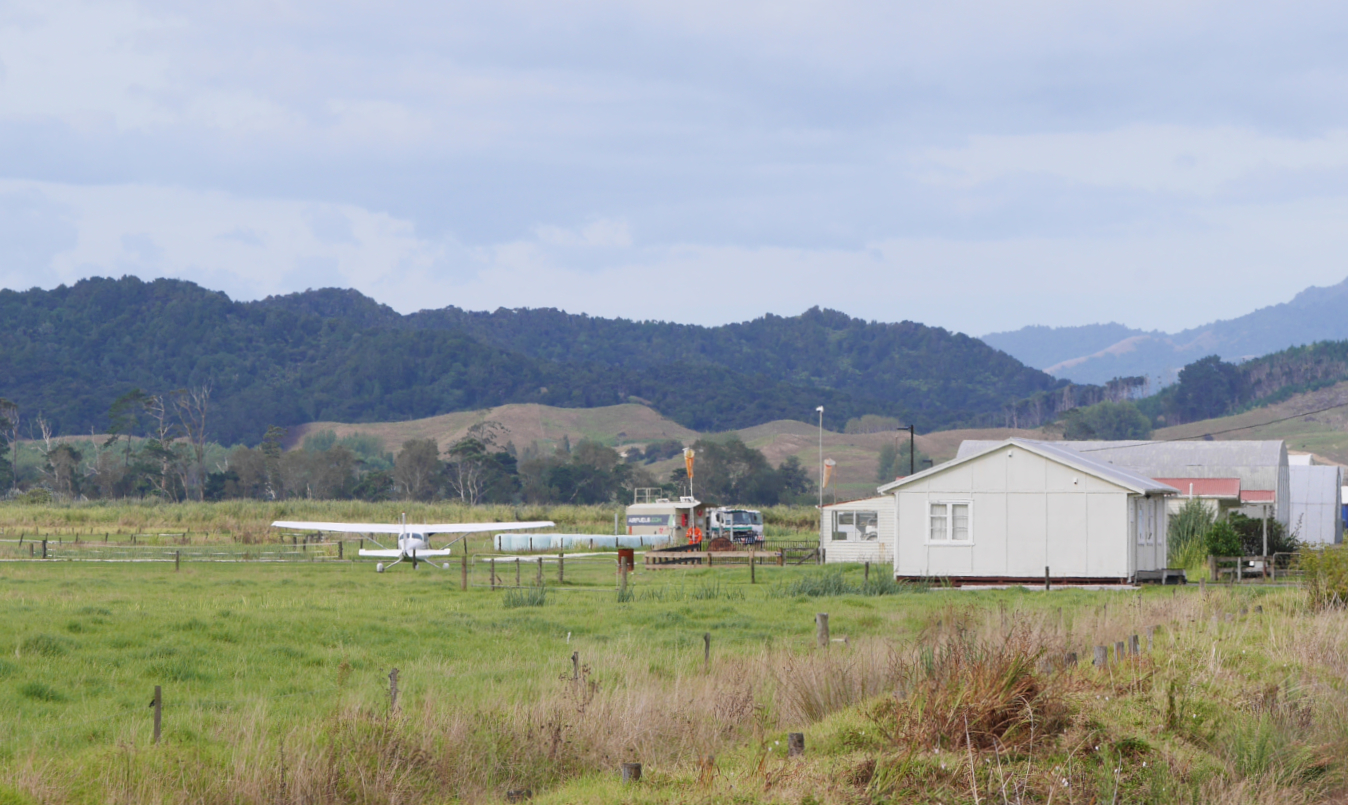
- IATA: DGR; ICAO: NZDA

Summary
- Airport type: Public
- Operator: Dargaville Aero Club
- Location: Dargaville
- Elevation AMSL: 6 ft / 1.9 m
- Coordinates: 35°56′23″S 173°53′37″E
- Interactive map of Dargaville Aerodrome

Runways
Direction	Length		Surface
Direction	ft	m	Surface
04/22	3,280	1,000	Rolled limestone
04/22	2,952	900	Grass

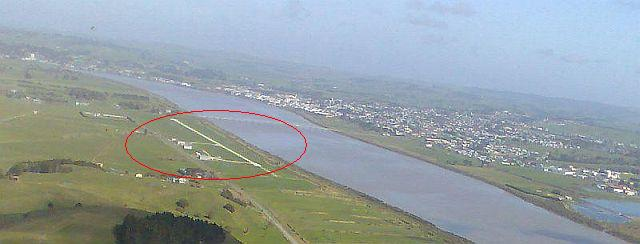
Dargaville Airfield from the East

Dargaville Aerodrome (IATA: DGR, ICAO: NZDA) is a small airport located 1 Nautical Mile (1.9 km) southeast of Dargaville township in Northland, New Zealand.

The airfield has an active aero club that provides training in advanced microlights, and has a regular 'fly-in' lunch every Saturday which attracts aviators from New Zealand's North island.

It is a base for topdressing aircraft working the surrounding area, and has Avgas available with a "Z" swipecard.

Other airfields near to Dargaville are Ruawai Aerodrome, Whangarei Airport, Waro Airstrip, Kaikohe Airport and Waitotehoanga Airstrip.

== Operational Information ==
- Airfield Elevation: 6 ft AMSL
- Runway 04/22 – 1000 x 12 metres rolled limestone
- Runway 04/22 – 931 x 11 metres grass
- Runway Strength – 02/20: ESWL 2500
- No runway lighting available
- Circuit:
  - Runways 04 – Right Hand
  - Runways 22 – Left Hand

== Sources ==
- NZAIP Volume 4 AD
- New Zealand AIP (PDF)
- Dargaville Aero Club web site
