= Dargaville =

Town in Northland, New Zealand

Dargaville Tākiwira (Māori)
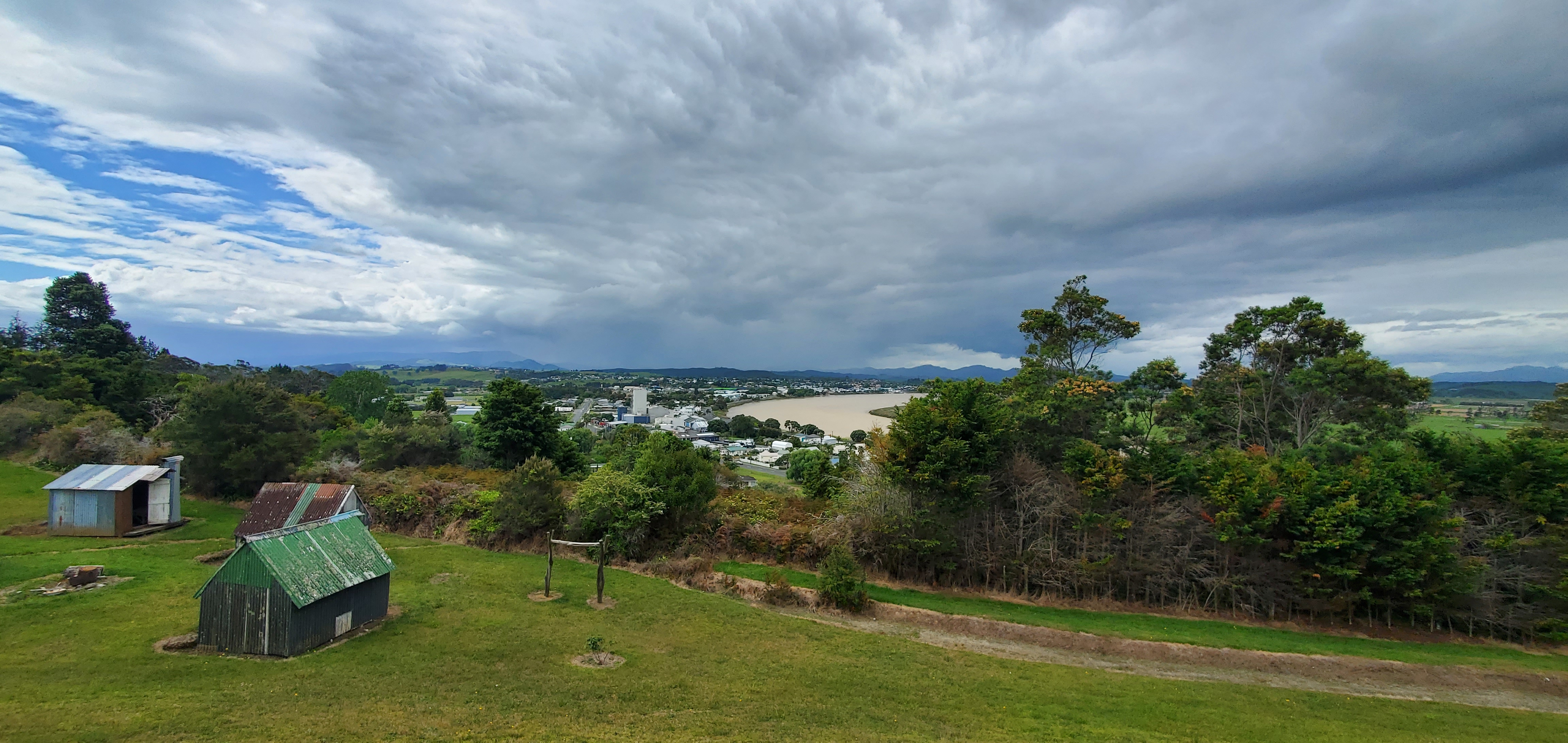
- View of Dargaville from Mount Wesley (2024)
- Motto: Heart of the Kauri Coast
- Interactive map of Dargaville
- Coordinates: 35°56′18″S 173°52′18″E
- Country: New Zealand
- Region: Northland Region
- District: Kaipara District
- Ward: Wairoa Ward
- Electorates: Northland; Te Tai Tokerau

Government
  - Territorial Authority: Kaipara District Council
  - Regional council: Northland Regional Council
  - Mayor of Kaipara: Jonathan Larsen
  - Northland MP: Grant McCallum
  - Te Tai Tokerau MP: TBD

Area
  - Total: 12.86 km^{2} (4.97 sq mi)

Population (June 2025)
  - Total: 5,170
  - Density: 402/km^{2} (1,040/sq mi)
- Postcode(s): 0310

Dargaville (Māori: Tākiwira) is a town located in the North Island of New Zealand. It is situated on the bank of the Northern Wairoa River in the Kaipara District of the Northland region. Dargaville is located 55 kilometres (34 mi) southwest of Whangārei, and 174 kilometres (108 mi) north of Auckland.

Dargaville is noted for the high proportion of residents of Croatian descent. The area around it is one of the chief regions in the country for cultivating kūmara (sweet potato) and so Dargaville is known by many locals as the "Kūmara Capital" of New Zealand.

== History and culture ==
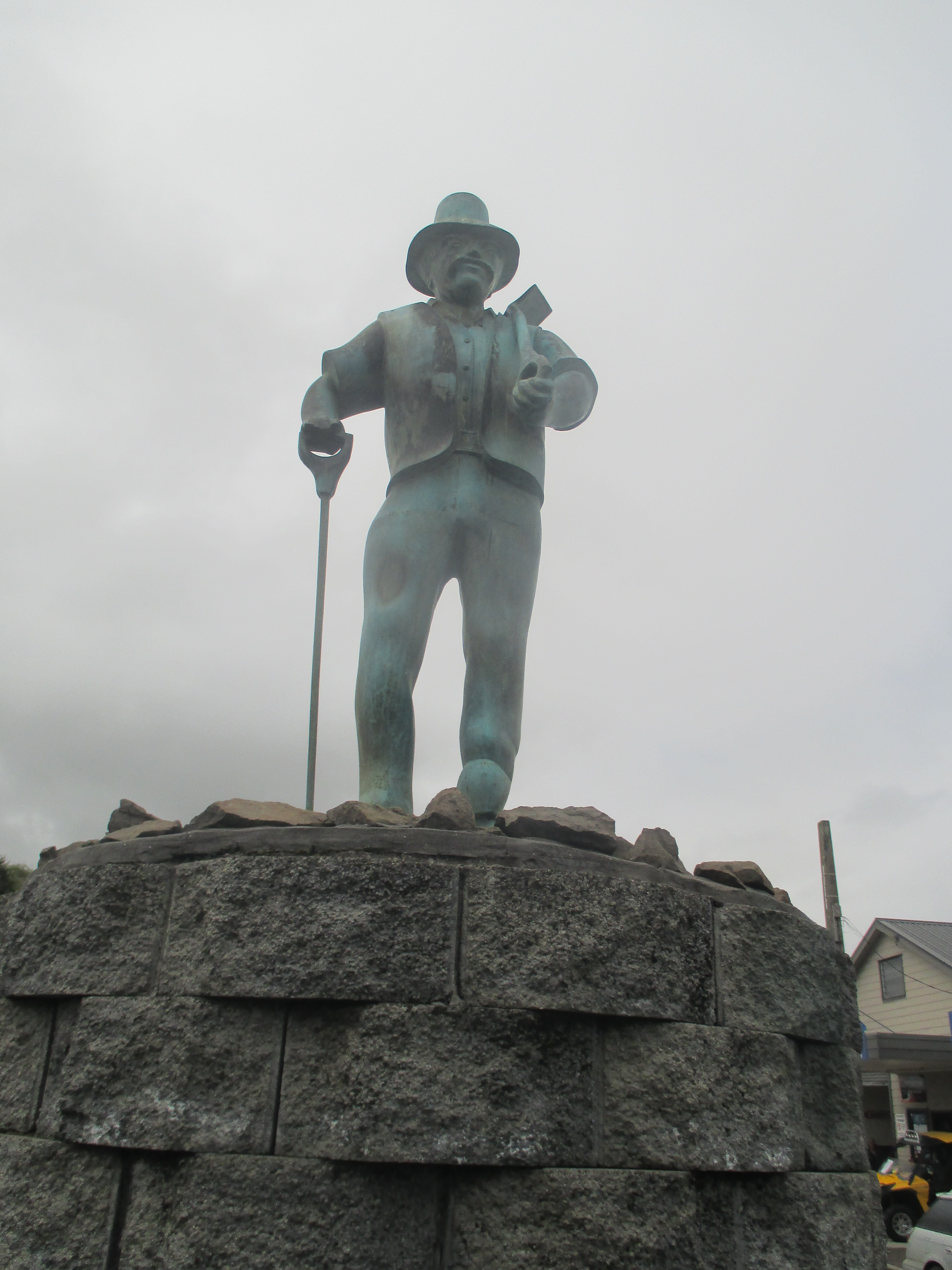
Gumdigger statue at Dargaville

The town was established by and named after timber merchant Joseph Dargaville (1837–1896), who purchased the then Tunatahi block from local Iwi. Dargaville was founded in 1872, during the 19th-century kauri gum and timber trade.

Dargaville was made a borough in 1908.

The area became known for a thriving industry that included gum digging and kauri logging, which was based mainly at Te Kōpuru, several kilometres south of Dargaville on the banks of the Wairoa River. The river was used to transport the huge logs downstream to shipbuilders and as a primary means of transport to Auckland. Dalmatian migrants were particularly prominent in the kauri gum extraction. After the gum and forestry industries started to decline after 1920, farming, especially dairy became a significant contributor to the economy.

The Wairoa River was the main method of transport around Dargaville until the 1940s.

Horses last raced at the Dargaville racecourse in 2016. A proposal in 2022 was submitted to redevelop the racecourse into 450 homes. This private plan change was accepted by the Kaipara Council and released for public consultation in July 2022.

The Bank of New Zealand closed its Dargaville branch in 2020. The Dargaville Town Hall had to be closed and partially demolished in 2023 following damage sustained during Cyclone Gabrielle.

== Demographics ==
Statistics New Zealand describes Dargaville as a small urban centre. It covers 12.86 km^{2} (4.97 sq mi) and had an estimated population of 5,170 as of June 2025, with a population density of 402 people per km^{2}.

Historical population
Year	Pop.	±% p.a.
2006	4,455	—
2013	4,284	−0.56%
2018	4,827	+2.42%
2023	5,016	+0.77%
The 2006 population is for a smaller area of 12.56 km^{2}. Source:

Dargaville had a population of 5,016 in the 2023 New Zealand census, an increase of 189 people (3.9%) since the 2018 census, and an increase of 732 people (17.1%) since the 2013 census. There were 2,460 males, 2,544 females and 15 people of other genders in 1,944 dwellings. 2.4% of people identified as LGBTIQ+. The median age was 43.4 years (compared with 38.1 years nationally). There were 957 people (19.1%) aged under 15 years, 792 (15.8%) aged 15 to 29, 1,959 (39.1%) aged 30 to 64, and 1,311 (26.1%) aged 65 or older.

People could identify as more than one ethnicity. The results were 70.5% European (Pākehā); 37.6% Māori; 9.9% Pasifika; 4.7% Asian; 0.4% Middle Eastern, Latin American and African New Zealanders (MELAA); and 1.8% other, which includes people giving their ethnicity as "New Zealander". English was spoken by 96.7%, Māori language by 7.7%, Samoan by 0.6%, and other languages by 7.4%. No language could be spoken by 1.9% (e.g. too young to talk). New Zealand Sign Language was known by 0.7%. The percentage of people born overseas was 14.4, compared with 28.8% nationally.

Religious affiliations were 39.2% Christian, 1.0% Hindu, 0.3% Islam, 3.6% Māori religious beliefs, 0.3% Buddhist, 0.2% New Age, and 1.3% other religions. People who answered that they had no religion were 45.7%, and 9.1% of people did not answer the census question.

Of those at least 15 years old, 294 (7.2%) people had a bachelor's or higher degree, 2,247 (55.4%) had a post-high school certificate or diploma, and 1,437 (35.4%) people exclusively held high school qualifications. The median income was $29,100, compared with $41,500 nationally. 159 people (3.9%) earned over $100,000 compared to 12.1% nationally. The employment status of those at least 15 was that 1,587 (39.1%) people were employed full-time, 510 (12.6%) were part-time, and 150 (3.7%) were unemployed.

== Geography ==
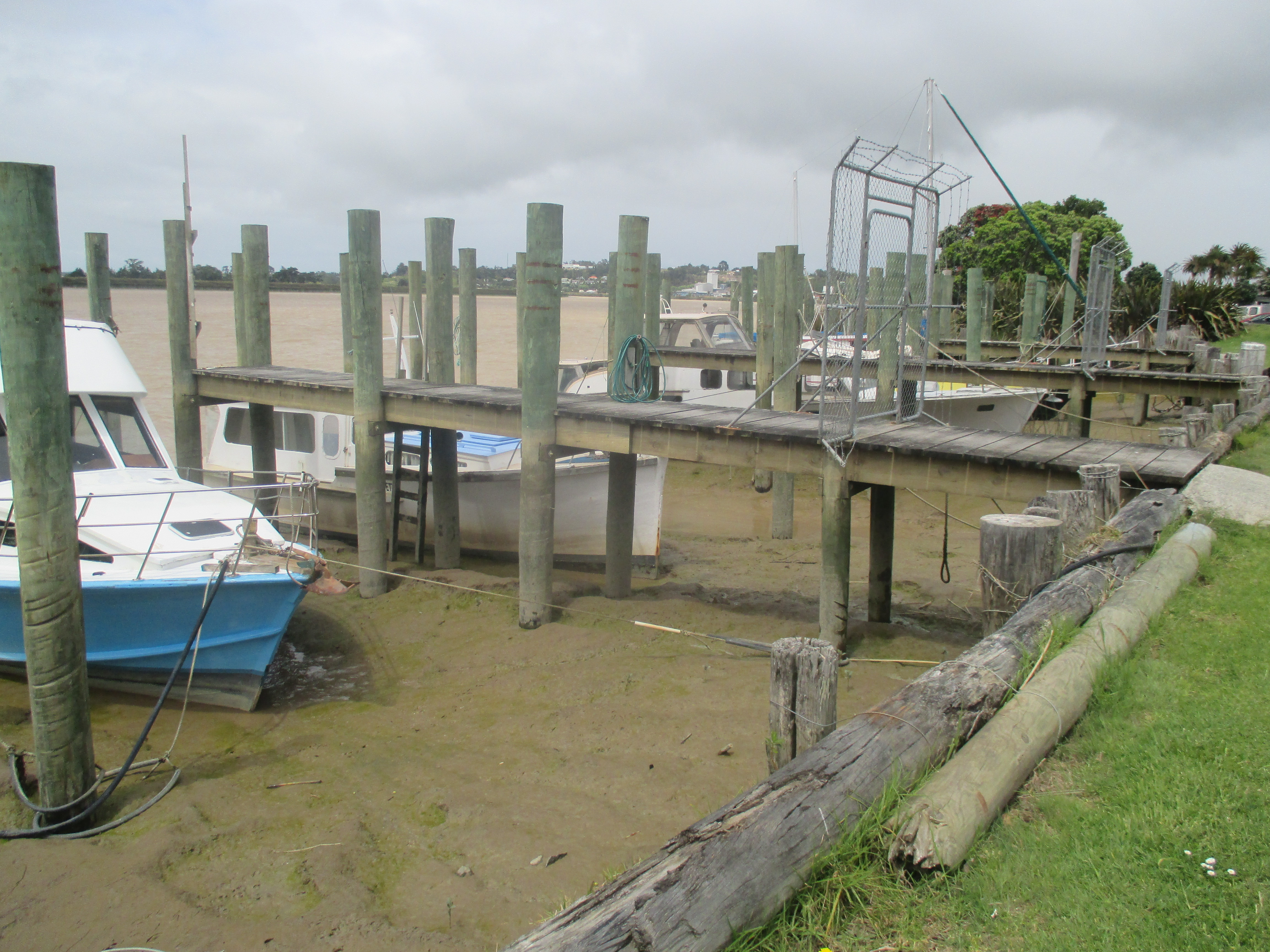
Boats moored near central Dargaville

The nearby Ripirō Beach has the longest unbroken stretches of sand beach in New Zealand and is largely drivable from one end to the other. This beach is home of the famous local shellfish delicacy the toheroa. Overexploitation in the 1950s and 1960s caused the population of the shellfish to decline so much that public gathering of the shellfish is now prohibited.

Dargaville is situated by the Wairoa River, with the rural locality of Turiwiri-based across the river from the Dargaville Wairoa River Bridge. Dargaville also houses several boat moorings and a central wharf adjacent to the town centre. The river is tidal when it passes through Dargaville.

Dargaville also includes the previously established village of Mangawhare, with both areas being separated by the Kaihu River – a tributary of the Wairoa. Beyond Mangawhare lies the rural locality of Aoroa, which borders Mount Weasley and Harding Park.

== Climate ==
Köppen-Geiger climate classification system classifies its climate as oceanic (Cfb) with warm summers and mild winters.

Climate data for Dargaville (1991–2020 normals, extremes 1943–present)
Month	Jan	Feb	Mar	Apr	May	Jun	Jul	Aug	Sep	Oct	Nov	Dec	Year
Record high °C (°F)	31.8 (89.2)	32.4 (90.3)	32.1 (89.8)	28.9 (84.0)	24.9 (76.8)	24.4 (75.9)	21.7 (71.1)	25.0 (77.0)	24.5 (76.1)	25.6 (78.1)	27.3 (81.1)	29.9 (85.8)	32.4 (90.3)
Mean maximum °C (°F)	28.1 (82.6)	28.7 (83.7)	27.0 (80.6)	24.8 (76.6)	22.3 (72.1)	20.0 (68.0)	18.8 (65.8)	19.3 (66.7)	21.2 (70.2)	22.3 (72.1)	24.0 (75.2)	26.8 (80.2)	29.2 (84.6)
Mean daily maximum °C (°F)	23.3 (73.9)	24.0 (75.2)	22.5 (72.5)	20.3 (68.5)	17.9 (64.2)	15.6 (60.1)	14.8 (58.6)	15.1 (59.2)	16.4 (61.5)	17.7 (63.9)	19.3 (66.7)	21.7 (71.1)	19.1 (66.3)
Daily mean °C (°F)	19.3 (66.7)	19.8 (67.6)	18.4 (65.1)	16.5 (61.7)	14.5 (58.1)	12.4 (54.3)	11.5 (52.7)	11.8 (53.2)	13.1 (55.6)	14.3 (57.7)	15.7 (60.3)	17.9 (64.2)	15.4 (59.8)
Mean daily minimum °C (°F)	15.2 (59.4)	15.5 (59.9)	14.3 (57.7)	12.7 (54.9)	11.1 (52.0)	9.2 (48.6)	8.2 (46.8)	8.5 (47.3)	9.8 (49.6)	11.0 (51.8)	12.0 (53.6)	14.1 (57.4)	11.8 (53.3)
Mean minimum °C (°F)	9.8 (49.6)	10.8 (51.4)	8.9 (48.0)	6.2 (43.2)	4.4 (39.9)	1.8 (35.2)	1.3 (34.3)	2.5 (36.5)	3.8 (38.8)	6.1 (43.0)	7.0 (44.6)	9.0 (48.2)	0.6 (33.1)
Record low °C (°F)	4.0 (39.2)	1.7 (35.1)	0.0 (32.0)	−1.3 (29.7)	−3.3 (26.1)	−3.3 (26.1)	−5.0 (23.0)	−3.3 (26.1)	−1.9 (28.6)	0.6 (33.1)	2.2 (36.0)	1.2 (34.2)	−5.0 (23.0)
Average rainfall mm (inches)	64.8 (2.55)	55.5 (2.19)	64.7 (2.55)	86.7 (3.41)	114.7 (4.52)	124.9 (4.92)	148.2 (5.83)	114.6 (4.51)	98.4 (3.87)	77.1 (3.04)	65.5 (2.58)	78.9 (3.11)	1,094 (43.08)
Mean monthly sunshine hours	231.3	192.2	193.1	162.6	145.4	128.4	136.9	151.4	163.3	184.1	197.6	194.4	2,080.7
Source: NIWA

== Infrastructure ==
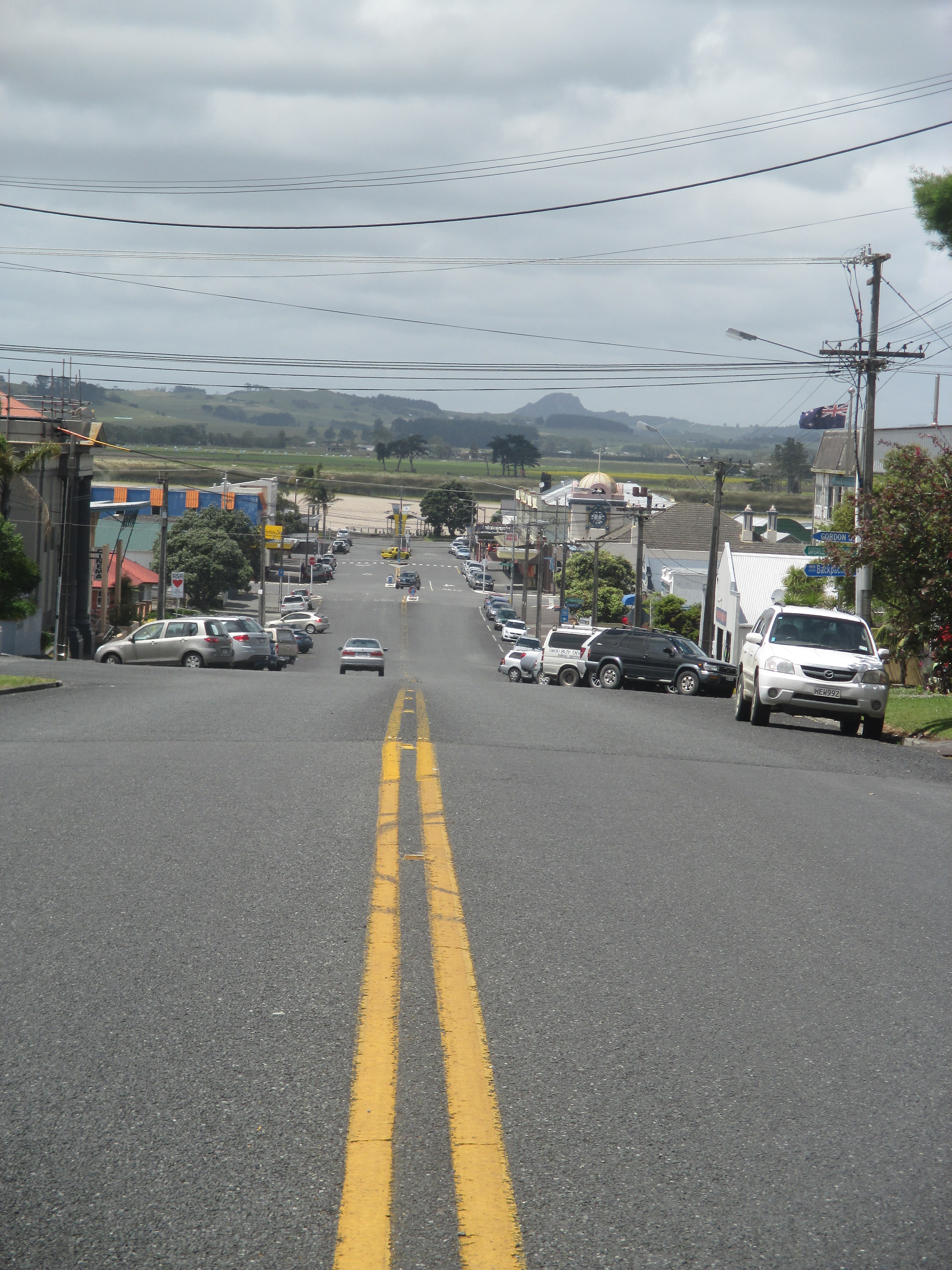
Hokianga Road, one of the main roads in Dargaville township

=== Hospital ===
Dargaville Hospital and Medical Centre is located at 77 Awakino Road. It provides a 12-bed general medical ward, a 4-bed post-natal maternity unit. It also provides emergency, radiology, laboratory, physiotherapy, occupational therapy, social work and district nursing services. An eight-bed detoxification ward is also located on site. Doctors from Whangārei Hospital also run outpatient clinics at Dargaville Hospital.

=== Road ===
Dargaville is on the junction of State Highways 12 and 14. Pouto Road, which travels south along the Pouto Peninsula towards the townships of Te Kōpuru and Pouto, terminates at the junction of State Highway 12 in Mangawhare, whereas Hokianga Road transforms into Waihue Road just beyond the township of Dargaville, leading to the nearby rural locality of Waihue.

=== Rail ===
North of the town, the Donnellys Crossing Section railway was established to provide access to other logging activities. The first portion of this line was opened in 1889, it reached its greatest extent in 1923, and after operating isolated from the national rail network for decades, it was connected with the North Auckland Line by the Dargaville Branch in 1940. The Donnelly's Crossing Section closed in 1959, but the Dargaville Branch remains in use by a tourist venture, having had freight services withdrawn by KiwiRail since October 2014.

=== Air ===
The Dargaville aerodrome is located on the banks of the Wairoa River within the locality of Turiwiri, just south of the town of Dargaville.

== Farming ==
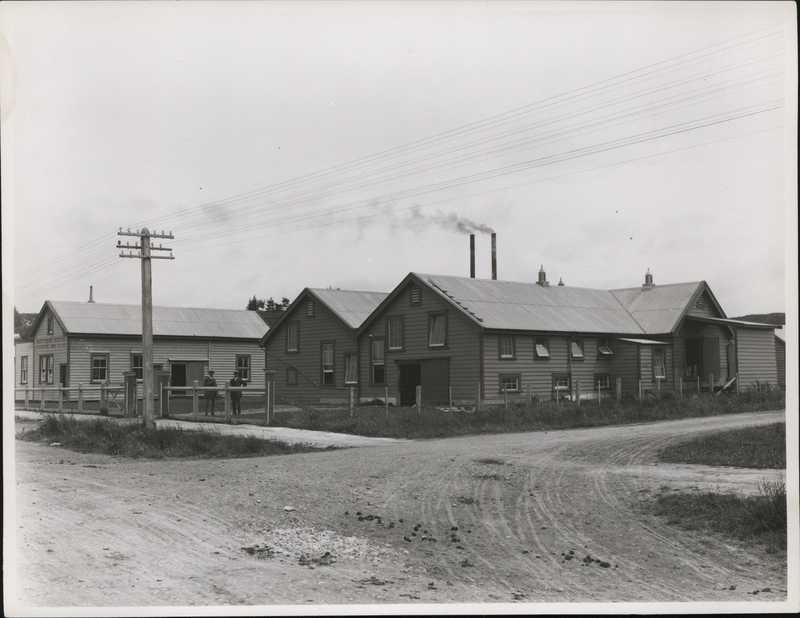
Dargaville dairy factory in 1912

The area around Dargaville is now predominantly a farming region and supports extensive dairy, beef, and sheep farms, as well as a thriving plantation forest industry. The Silver Fern Farms meat processing plant is located on Tuna Street. It employed 300 staff in 2021.

== Amenities ==
The Kai Iwi lakes are 25 kilometres north of Dargaville, whereas Trounson Kauri Park is located a further 37 kilometres north of the town centre.

=== Beach ===
Ripiro Beach is the local beach, just 13 kilometres from the township, and offers 107 kilometres of rugged west coast surf.

=== Swimming pool ===
The Kauri Coast community swimming pool is located at 8 Onslow Street. The 50-metre outdoor swimming pool was built in 2010 at a cost of $6 million and was damaged in 2011 with a large bulge and crack in the middle of it as a result of removing the weight of the water.

=== Sportsville ===
Located at the Dargaville Rugby Park, Sportsville is a multi-purpose sports complex that facilitates Tennis, Soccer, Volleyball, Netball, Rugby League, and Rugby Union.

=== Golf course ===
The Northern Wairoa Golf Club (NWGC) is located at 819 Baylys Coast Road. It is an 18-hole par 72 layout.The golf course provides sea views throughout. The fairways are lined with pōhutukawa trees and are wide and open. The greens are large, maintained, and of moderate speed. All making NWGC an enjoyable layout and playable course.

== Government ==
The Kaipara District Council provides local government services for Dargaville. They are located at 32 Hokianga Road. The Northland Regional Council provides regional government services for Dargaville. They also operate out of the same building at 32 Hokianga Road which cost $9.2 million and opened in 2022. Dargaville is part of the Northland electorate for the New Zealand parliament.

== Culture ==
=== Dargaville Museum ===
The Dargaville Museum Te Whare Taonga o Tunatahi is located in Harding Park (32 Mt Wesley Coast Road, Dargaville), within the suburb of Mangawhare. The museum focuses on local history including exhibitions of Maori history, early European pioneers, industrial and maritime history. Exhibits include a 16-metre-long Māori Waka and a display hall showcasing the history of the Gum diggers. The museum also has a research library and archives as well as the masts from the Greenpeace Rainbow Warrior located just outside the Lighthouse Function Centre.

The former Aratapu public library building is part of the Dargaville Museum exhibition space. This building is listed as a category 2 historic place with Heritage New Zealand and was built in 1874. The building was relocated to Harding Park and restored by volunteers. It was built in a neo-classical style made from timber. It previously served as a schoolhouse, a library and a post office.

=== Theatre ===
The Dargaville Little Theatre is an amateur theatre company based in the former Mititai Masonic Lodge, which was transported 14 kilometres up the Wairoa River to its current location at 241 Victoria Street, towards the locality of Awakino Point. Incorporated in 1963, the Dargaville Little Theatre can trace its origins back to the early 1900s, when the community rehearsed in members' homes and performed in local halls, such as the Northern Wairoa War Memorial Hall. In 2022, the Dargaville Little Theatre won the TheatreFest Book of Honour award from Theatre New Zealand for their original musical piece 'Out of Mind' in Wellington.

=== Circus ===
Circus Kumarani, New Zealand's longest running rural community circus, was founded in Dargaville in 2003 with the support of Kauriland Skills Centre, Greenways Trust, and the Dargaville Little Theatre. Headquartered in the former Dargaville Bakery at 15 Onslow Street, Circus Kumarani offers community-based circus and social arts classes for children and adults across the Kaipara and Whangārei regions, and circus festivals, namely the Northland Circus Festival and the Youth Circus Festival alongside other circus-based organisations in Northland and Auckland.

=== Kaipara Heritage Machinery Museum ===
Established in 2001, and located adjacent to the Dargaville Museum at Harding Park, the Kaipara Heritage Machinery Museum houses and displays an extensive collection of machinery equipment and tractors used in land cultivation during the early years of the settlement, including a 120-year-old operational woolshed powered by a three-horsepower petrol stationary engine.

=== Marae ===
Te Houhanga Marae and Rāhiri meeting house on Station Road is a traditional meeting place for Te Roroa and the Ngāti Whātua hapū of Te Kuihi.

=== Cinema ===
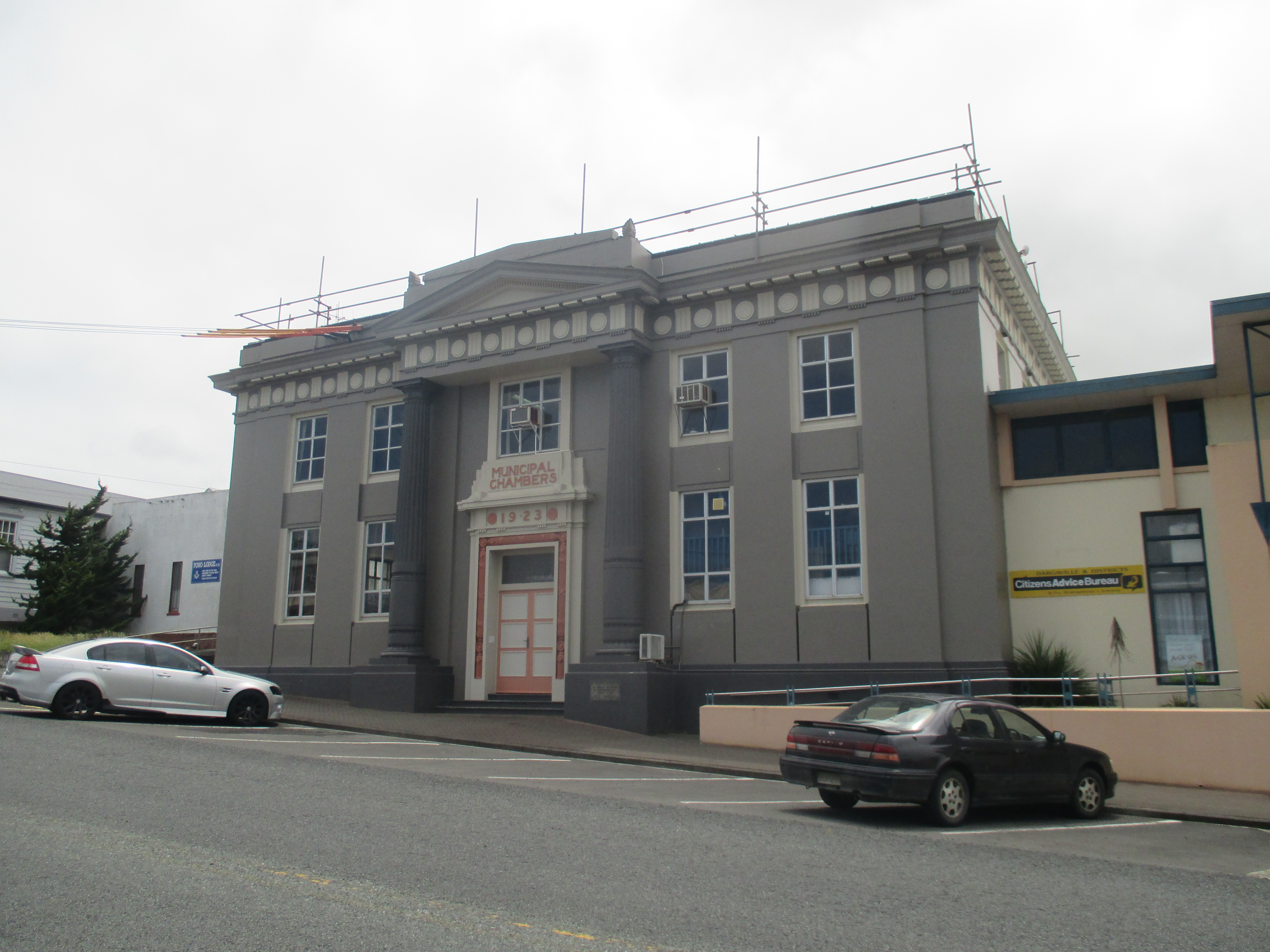
Municipal Chambers, now housing the ANZAC Theatre.

The ANZAC Theatre Te Whare Pikitia o Tunatahi, is located at 39 Hokianga Road. It opened in 2013. Prior to 2013, Dargaville did not have a cinema for more than 30 years. The cinema itself is based in the old library space in the former War Memorial Town Hall, with the entrance in the now repurposed Dargaville Municipal Chambers.

== Notable buildings ==
=== Holy Trinity church ===
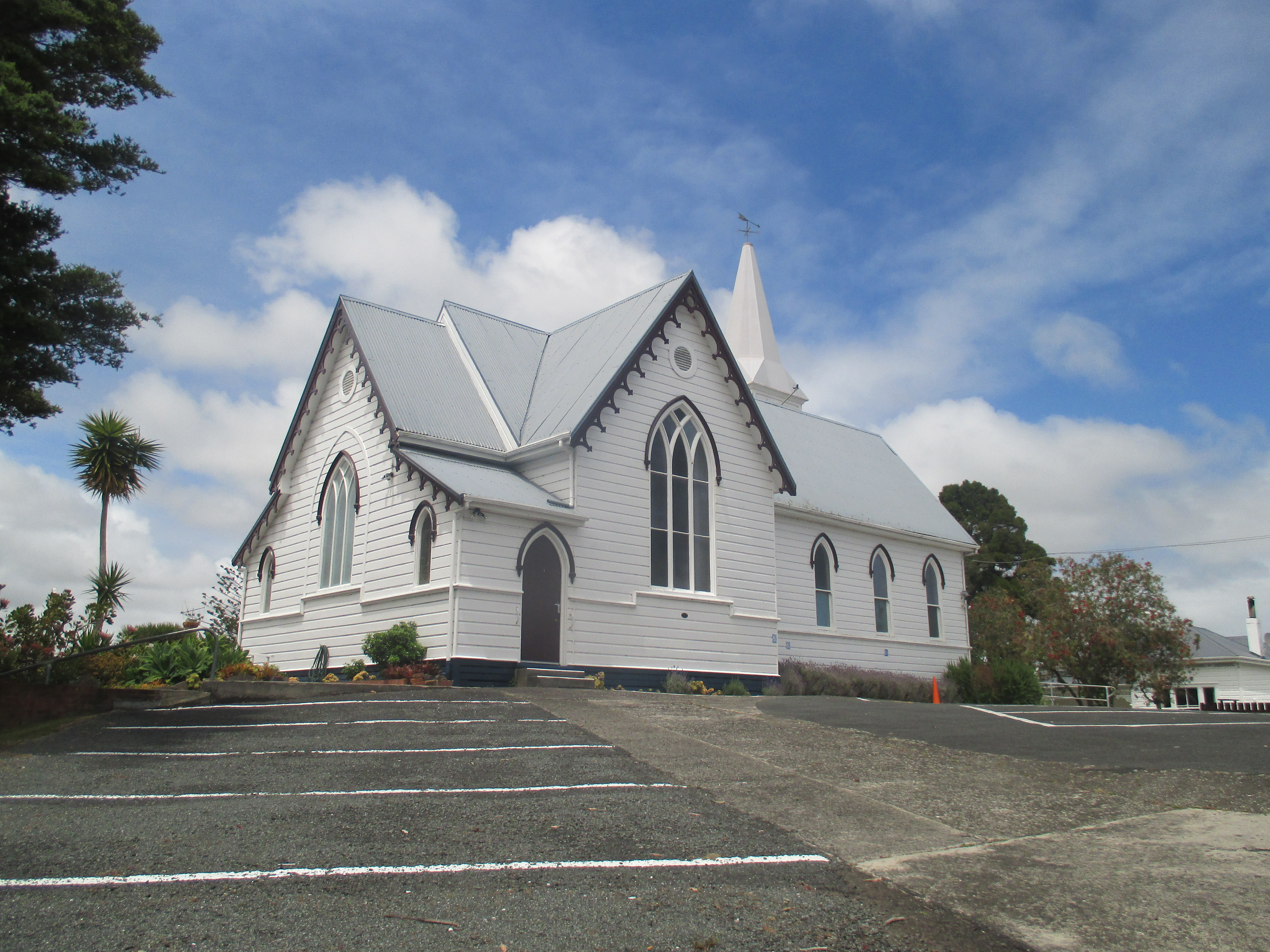
Holy Trinity Church, Dargaville

The Holy Trinity church is an Anglican church that was built around 1878. Located at 58 Hokianga Road, it was designed by Edward Mahoney & Sons architectural practice. The church is a listed with Heritage New Zealand as a category two historic place. The magnificent east-facing stained glass window was given in memory of the founder of the town, Dargaville.

=== River Road historic area ===
Located on the waterfront of Mangawhare, the River Road historic area holds nine houses (7 to 27 River Road) listed with Heritage New Zealand. Marriner house (61 River Road) is also listed as a category two historic place being built in 1845. The Commercial Hotel (73–77 River Road) and cottages at 143 River Road and 145 River Road are also category two historic places.

=== Band rotunda ===
The war memorial band rotunda on Victoria St dates from World War I and is a Heritage New Zealand category 2 historic place.

== Education ==
Dargaville High School is a secondary (years 9–13) school with a roll of 405 students. The school opened in 1921 but was destroyed by fire in 1937 and rebuilt the following year. Dargaville Intermediate is an intermediate (years 7–8) school with a roll of 169 students.

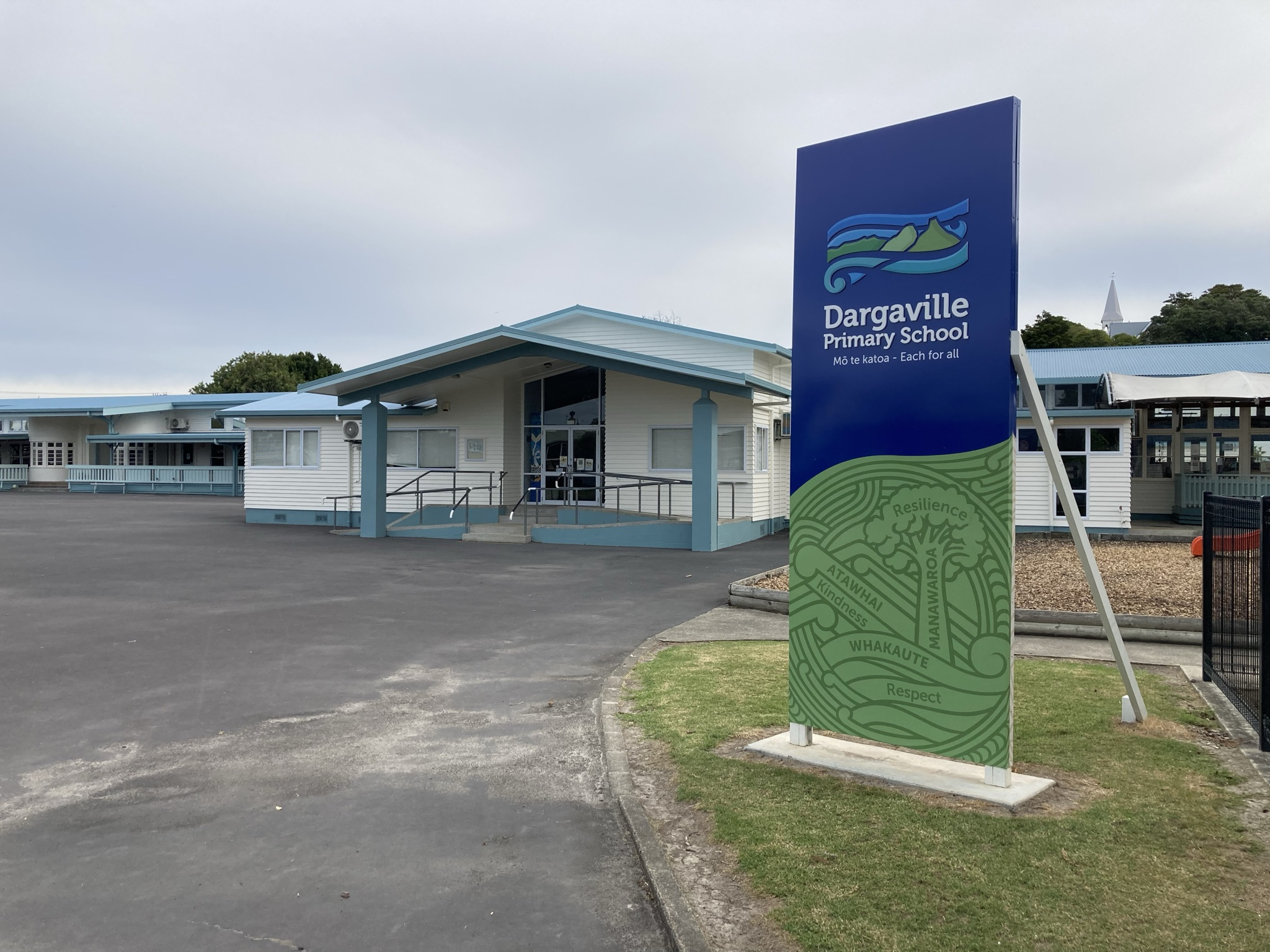
Dargaville Primary School

Dargaville Primary School and Selwyn Park School are contributing primary (years 1–6) schools with rolls of 401 students and 143 students respectively. Dargaville Primary was established by 1877. In 1879, it had a roll of 16, which grew to 155 in 1899. Selwyn Park celebrated its 50th Jubilee in 2008.

St Joseph's School is a full primary (years 1–8) school with a roll of 96 students. It is a state integrated Catholic school.

All these schools are coeducational. Rolls are as of July 2026.

NorthTec polytechnic also has a campus in Dargaville located at 24 Parore Street.

== Notable people ==
- Amelia Batistich, writer, was born here in 1905
- Joey Carbery, Irish international rugby union player
- Robert Hornblow (1861–1937), the town's mayor from 1919 to 1925
- Dion Nash, cricketer
- Louis Parore, Māori leader, interpreter, land court agent, born at Te Houhanga Marae, Northland
- Mike Perjanik, musician, record producer and composer
- Winston Peters, politician and leader of the New Zealand First party
- Mark Taylor, All Black
- Frank Watkins, World War II RNZAF pilot
- Mark Williams, singer and recording artist

== See also ==
- Croatian New Zealanders
