= RAF Wyton =

UK military intelligence analysis facility in Cambridgeshire, England

RAF Wyton
- Near St Ives, Cambridgeshire in England
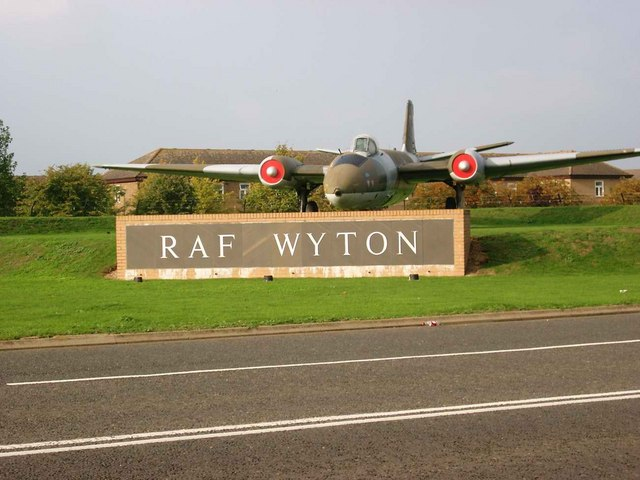
- Canberra PR.9 gate guardian

- Verum Exquiro (Latin for 'Seek the Truth')

Site information
- Type: Royal Air Force station
- Owner: Ministry of Defence
- Operator: Royal Air Force
- Controlled by: Strategic Command
- Condition: Operational
- Website: www.raf.mod.uk/our-organisation/stations/raf-wyton

Location
- Shown within Cambridgeshire RAF Wyton (the United Kingdom)
- Coordinates: 52°21′26″N 000°06′28″W
- Grid reference: TL285741

Site history
- Built: 1915
- In use: 1916 – present

Garrison information
- Current commander: Wing Commander Jim Doyle
- Occupants: National Centre for Geospatial Intelligence; 42 Engineer Regiment (Geographic); Defence Infrastructure Organisation; Defence Assurance and Information Security; Defence Intelligence Estates Rationalisation Team; RAF Wyton Area Voluntary Band

Airfield information
- Identifiers: IATA: QUY, ICAO: EGUY, WMO: 03566
- Elevation: 132 feet (40 m) AMSL
Runways
Direction	Length and surface
08/26	799 metres (2,621 ft) Grass
- Source: RAF Wyton Defence Aerodrome Manual

Royal Air Force Wyton or more simply RAF Wyton (IATA: QUY, ICAO: EGUY) is a Royal Air Force station near St Ives, Cambridgeshire, England. The airfield was decommissioned and, in 2018, reused as commercial car storing facility. The station is now under the command of Cyber & Specialist Operations Command.

RAF Wyton is home to the National Centre for Geospatial Intelligence (NCGI), which provides Open Source Intelligence (OSINT) and Geospatial Intelligence (GEOINT) support to the British Armed Forces. It also contains the Ministry of Defence Police Headquarters, the Defence Infrastructure Organisation Regional Headquarters, 42 Engineer Regiment (Geographic), and several other UK and Allied capabilities, authorities, and departments.

Located within the station, the Pathfinder Building is described as the "operations centre of Defence Intelligence" and the “largest Top Secret, Five-Eyes by design, military intelligence fusion and assessment facility in the world."

== History ==
=== Flying station ===
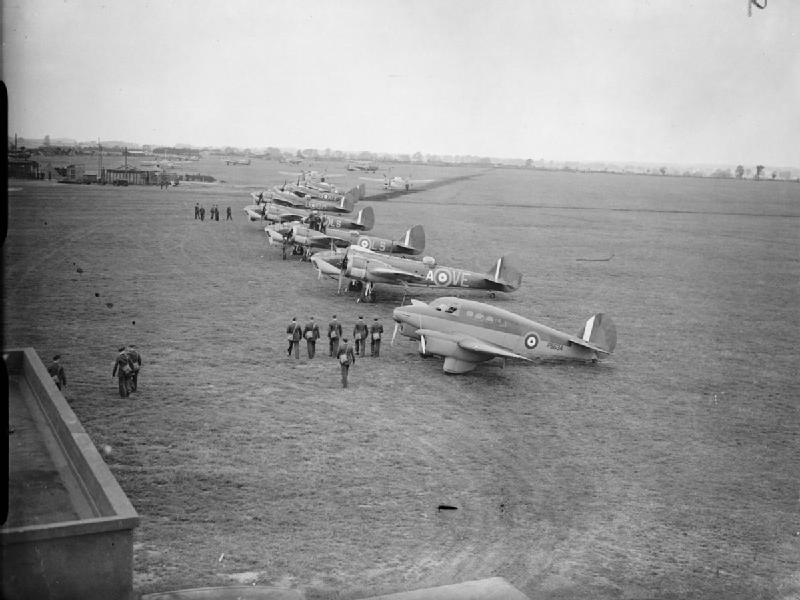
A Percival Petrel and Bristol Blenheim Mark IVs of No. 2 Group at Wyton between 1939 and 1941

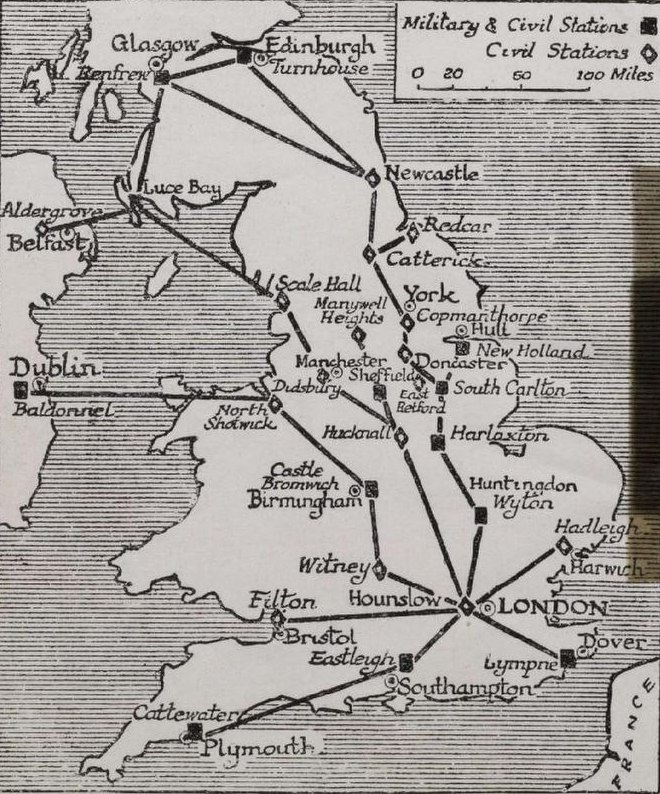
"Map of Air Routes and Landing Places in Great Britain, as temporarily arranged by the Air Ministry for civilian flying", published in 1919, showing "Wyton" as a "military and civil station", and as a stop on the route between Hounslow, near London, and the north.

Wyton has been a military airfield since 1916, when it was used for training by the Royal Flying Corps and then its successor the Royal Air Force (RAF).

The following squadrons were posted to Wyton between 1916 and 1935:

- No. 46 Squadron RFC between 1916 and 1916.
- No. 65 Squadron RFC between 1916 and 1917.
- No. 83 Squadron RFC between 1917 and 1917.
- No. 96 Squadron RAF between 1918 and 1918.
- No. 104 Squadron RFC between 1917 and 1917.
- No. 117 Squadron RAF between 1918 and 1919.
- No. 119 Squadron RAF between 1918 and 1918.
- No. 120 Squadron RAF between 1918 and 1918.
- No. 130 Squadron RAF between 1918 and 1918.
- No. 156 Squadron RAF between 1918 and 1918.
- No. 211 Squadron RAF between 1919 and 1919.

Second World War

During the Second World War it was used primarily as a bomber base, flying Bristol Blenheim, de Havilland Mosquito and Avro Lancaster aircraft.

Bristol Blenheim IV (N6215) of 139 Squadron became the first RAF aircraft to enter Germany in the Second World War on 3 September 1939, piloted by Flying Officer A. McPherson. He was awarded the DFC.

In 1942 it became the home of the Pathfinder Force under the command of Group Captain Don Bennett.

The following squadrons were posted to Wyton between 1935 and 1939:

- No. 44 Squadron between 1937 and 1937.
- No. 114 Squadron between 1936 and 1939.
- No. 139 Squadron between 1936 and 1939.

The following squadrons were posted to Wyton between 1939 and 1945:

- No. 15 Squadron between 1939 and 1940.
- No. 15 Squadron for a second time between 1940 and 1942.
- No. 40 Squadron between 1939 and 1941.
- No. 57 Squadron between 1940 and 1940.
- No. 57 Squadron for a second time between 1940 and 1940.
- No. 83 Squadron for a second time between 1942 and 1944.
- No. 105 Squadron between 1942 and 1945
- No. 109 Squadron between 1942 and 1942.
- No. 109 Squadron for a second time between 1942 and 1943.
- No. 128 Squadron between 1944 and 1945.
- No. 139 Squadron for a second time between 1943 and 1944.
- No. 156 Squadron for a second time between 1945 and 1945.
- No. 163 Squadron between 1945 and 1945.

Cold War

After the war Wyton became home to the English Electric Canberras of the Strategic Reconnaissance Force. Vickers Valiants arrived for No. 543 Squadron in 1955 and a Handley Page Victor arrived for the Radar Reconnaissance Flight in 1959.

In 1974, three Nimrod R1s belonging to No. 51 Squadron arrived for use in the Elint and Sigint role, and in 1975, the T17 and T17A Canberras of No. 360 Squadron arrived: this was a joint RAF and RN Squadron specialising in Electronic countermeasures training.

The following squadrons were posted to Wyton between 1946 and 2011:

- No. 13 Squadron between 1978 and 1982.
- No. 15 Squadron for a third time between 1946 and 1950.
- No. 25 Squadron between 1983 and 1989.
- No. 26 Squadron between 1969 and 1976.
- No. 39 Squadron between 1970 and 1982.
- No. 44 Squadron for a second time between 1946 and 1951.
- No. 51 Squadron between 1963 and 1995.
- No. 58 Squadron between 1953 and 1970.
- No. 82 Squadron between 1953 and 1956.
- No. 85 Squadron between 1989 and 1991
- No. 90 Squadron between 1946 and 1950.
- No. 100 Squadron between 1956 and 1956.
- No. 100 Squadron for a second time between 1982 and 19??.
- No. 138 Squadron between 1946 and 1950.
- No. 207 Squadron between 1969 and 1984.
- No. 360 Squadron between 1975 and 19??.
- No. 540 Squadron between 1953 and 1956.
- No. 542 Squadron between 1954 and 1955.
- No. 542 Squadron for a second time between 1955 and 1955.
- No. 543 Squadron between 1955 and 1974.

Post-Cold War

In the early 1990s one of its pilots was rugby union player Flight Lieutenant Rory Underwood.

During a four-month period in 1989, two squadrons of U.S. Air Force Fairchild Republic A-10 Thunderbolt II jets were operated out of RAF Wyton while the runway at their base, nearby RAF Alconbury, was resurfaced.

In May 1995 both RAF Wyton and RAF Alconbury airfields were decommissioned and Wyton was formally amalgamated with RAF Brampton, and later with RAF Henlow to make all three locations a single RAF Station under a single station commander for administrative purposes. The airfield continued to host light aircraft for the Cambridge and London University Air Squadrons until they both moved to RAF Wittering in 2015.

On 25 March 2013 it was decided to relocate all flying units from Wyton due to the high maintenance costs of the airfield.

Following the 2010 Strategic Defence and Security Review the RAF Brampton Wyton Henlow formation was disbanded: RAF Henlow subsequently became a separate station again and RAF Brampton was demolished.

=== Intelligence station ===
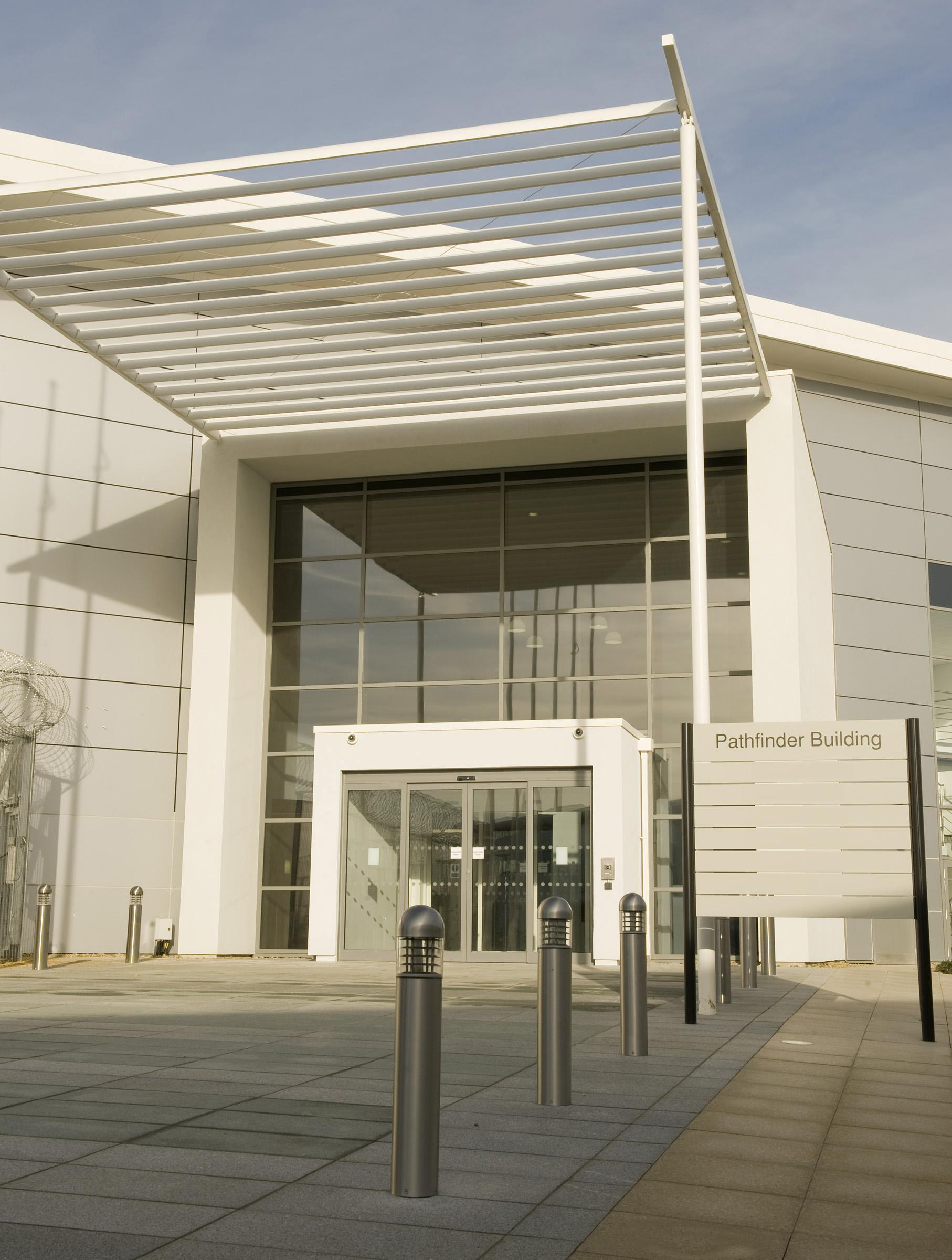
Pathfinder Building, built in 2012 to house the intelligence staff

The Joint Forces Intelligence Group (JFIG), a unit which was responsible for the collection of signals, geospatial, imagery and measurement and signature intelligence, moved from Feltham in Middlesex to RAF Wyton in 2013. 42 Engineer Regiment relocated from Denison Barracks in Hermitage to RAF Wyton to co-locate with the Joint Forces Intelligence Group in July 2014 and No. 1 Intelligence Surveillance Reconnaissance Squadron moved from RAF Marham to Wyton in April 2017. In 2014, the staffing of the Pathfinder Building was named the Defence Intelligence Fusion Centre.

In 2016, JFIG disbanded, and the bulk of its former units and capabilities were re-rolled to establish the National Centre for Geospatial Intelligence. The NCGI is a 1-star commanded organisation, which is also involved in homeland security and played a vital part in the Salisbury poisoning investigation by tracing the Novichok trail.

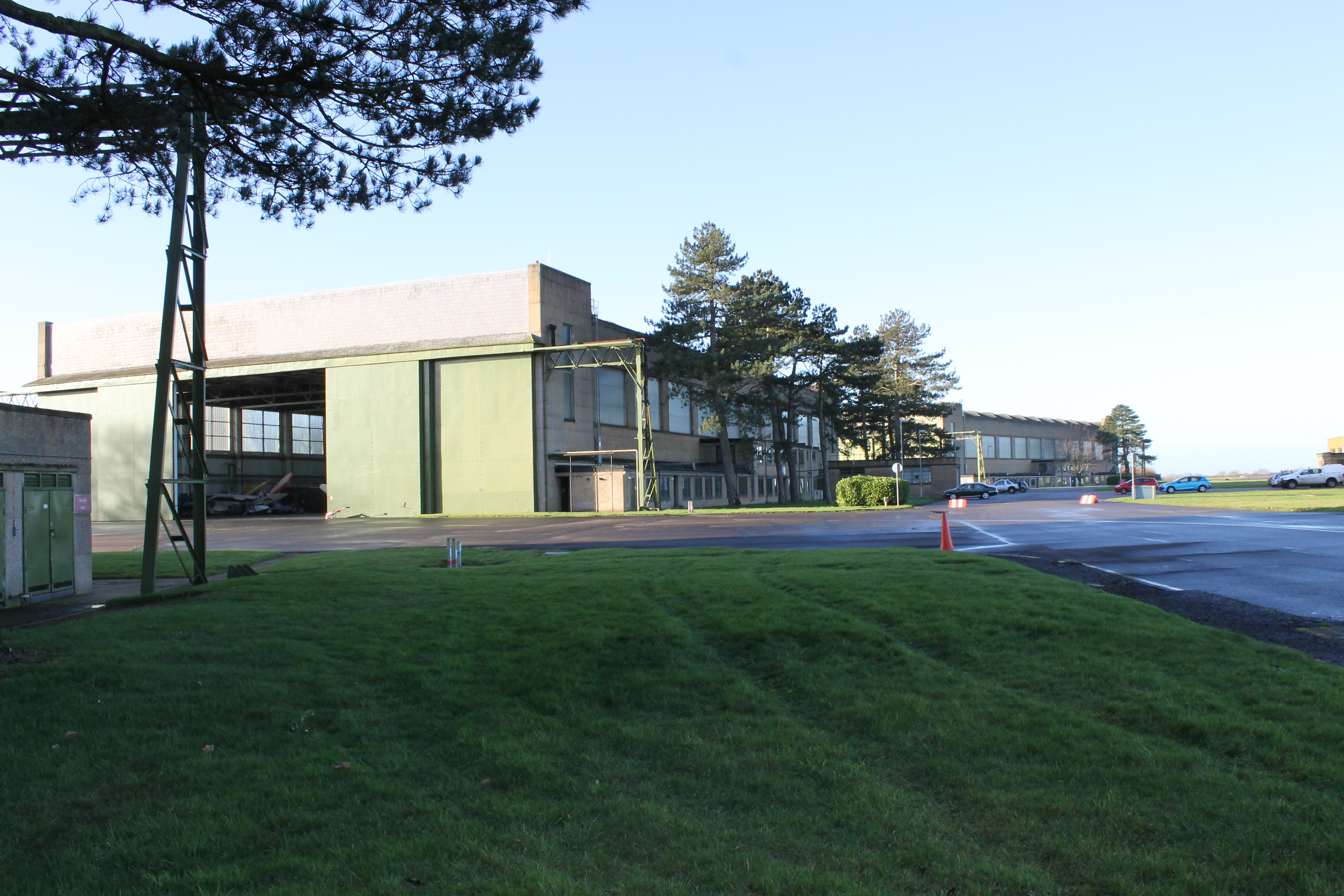
Hangars in 2013

== Former units ==
Other units moved (now disbanded)

The following other units were posted to Wyton at some point:

- No. 1 Photographic Reconnaissance Unit RAF (June 1982 - July 1992)
- No. 2 Group Communication Flight RAF (January 1940 - May 1943)
- No. 4 Blind Approach Training Flight RAF became No. 1504 (Beam Approach Training) Flight RAF (December 1940 - August 1942)
- No. 7 Group Communication Flight RAF (July 1940 - September 1941)
- 8th Aero Squadron
- No. 8 Group Communication Flight RAF (August 1942 - October 1945)
- No. 8 (Pathfinder Force) Group RAF (August 1942 - May 1943)
- No. 13 Aircraft Modification Unit RAF (March - August 1946)
- No. 70 (Bomber) Wing RAF
- No. 231 Operational Conversion Unit RAF (July 1982 - December 1990, May 1991 - April 1993)
- No. 1323 (Canberra) Flight RAF (October 1953 - November 1955)
- No. 1409 (Meteorological) Flight RAF (January - July 1945)
- No. 1499 (Bombing) Gunnery Flight RAF (March - June 1943)
- No. 1655 Mosquito Training Unit RAF
- No. 2730 Squadron RAF Regiment
- No. 2763 Squadron RAF Regiment
- No. 2781 Squadron RAF Regiment
- No. 2844 Squadron RAF Regiment
- NZ Air Race Flight RAF (June - October 1953)
- Canberra Standardisation and Training Flight RAF (December 1990 - May 1991)
- Electronic Warfare Division RAF became Electronic Warfare Detachment RAF (Unknown - December 1994)
- Electronic Warfare Engineering and Training Unit RAF (-1976) became Electronic Warfare and Avionics Unit RAF (1976-1993)
- Electronic Warfare Operational Support Establishment RAF (1983-1995) becoming part of Air Warfare Centre 1993
- Equipment Support (Air) Group RAF (November 1999 - unknown)
- Ground Controlled Approach Operators School RAF (March 1952)
- Logistics Command RAF (April 1995 - April 2000)
- Radar Reconnaissance Flight RAF (October 1955 - September 1961)
- Cambridgeshire Police Air Operations Unit

Currently operational units moved

On 25 March 2013 it was decided to relocate the following flying units from Wyton due to the high maintenance costs of the airfield.

- No. 57 Squadron RAF relocated to RAF Cranwell in Summer 2013.
- Cambridge University Air Squadron relocated to RAF Wittering in mid-2014.
- University of London Air Squadron relocated to RAF Wittering in mid-2014.
- No. 5 Air Experience Flight RAF also relocated to RAF Wittering in mid-2014.

== Based units ==
Notable units based at RAF Wyton.

=== Strategic Command ===
Defence Intelligence

- National Centre for Geospatial Intelligence (NCGI)

Defence Digital

- Defence Assurance and Information Security

=== Royal Air Force ===
No. 1 Group (Air Combat) RAF

- RAF Wyton Area Voluntary Band

No. 22 Group (Training) RAF

- Headquarters, Central & Eastern Region, Air Training Corps
- Headquarters, Bedfordshire and Cambridgeshire Wing, Air Training Corps

=== British Army ===
Royal Engineers

- 42 Engineer Regiment (Geographic)
  - 13 Geographic Squadron
  - 14 Geographic Squadron
  - 16 Geographic Support Squadron
  - 135 Geographic Squadron

=== Ministry of Defence ===
- Defence Infrastructure Organisation
- Defence Intelligence Estates Rationalisation Team (PRIDE)
- Ministry of Defence Police

=== United States Department of Defense ===
- Defense Contract Management Agency – United Kingdom

== See also ==
- List of Royal Air Force stations
- RAF Wyton Area Voluntary Band
