= 135 Geographic Squadron Royal Engineers =

British army unit

135 Geographic Squadron
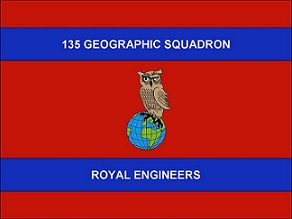
- Active: 1948 - Present
- Country: United Kingdom
- Branch: British Army
- Role: Geographic support
- Size: 3 troops (3 locations)
- Garrison/HQ: Mercator House, Ewell, Surrey
- Engagements: Op Agricola (2001-02) Bosnia; Op Silkman (2001-02) Sierra Leone; War in Afghanistan; Iraq War; Op Oculus (2004-2007) Bosnia

135 Geographic Squadron Royal Engineers is the only unit in the Army Reserve to support 42 Engineer Regiment (Geographic), a Royal Engineers regiment of the British Army. The squadron, formed originally in 1948, is a Joint Force Command specialist Royal Engineer unit that provides geographic support to all elements of UK Defence; particularly to Army headquarters, formations and units. The Squadron forms the 4th Sub-Unit within the Regiment assisting in delivering this capability.

The squadron consists of an HQ and two troops:

- Squadron HQ (Ewell, Wyton)
- 338 Troop (Reading)
- 339 Troop (Ewell)

== History ==
On 5 October 1948 135 Survey Engineer Regiment was formed with squadrons in Thame, London, Chessington and Southampton. Under a major organisation in April 1967, the regiment was reduced to squadron size and re-titled 135 Field Survey Squadron RE consisting of a squadron HQ, 337, 338 and 339 troops all based at Ewell. The squadron's role was changed to reinforce the Geographic branch at HQ British Army Of the Rhine (BAOR) working closely with 14 Geographic Squadron of 42 Engineer Regiment. In June 1986 the Squadron was re-titled 135 Independent Topographic Squadron RE with an additional troop (340 Troop) to carry out the role of map supply. To mark the new the title the Worshipful Company of Chartered Surveyors presented a new unit flag. In 2000 the squadron was re-titled to 135 Independent Geographic Squadron (Volunteers). On 1 April 2014 the squadron officially became part of 42 Engineer Regiment (Geographic) and subsequently changed its name to 135 Geographic Squadron (Reserves). The Regiment became a hybridised Unit composed of both Regular and Reserve Squadrons.

The squadron operates the Bulk Replication, Tactical Map Distribution Point and Forward Map Distribution Point vehicle systems as part of the Field Deployable GEOINT (FDG) capability.

The squadron also has a positioning survey role and regularly deploy on survey tasks.

Since 2001, a total of 38 soldiers from 135 Geo Squadron have deployed on 53 operational tours in 7 operational theatres.

== Freedoms ==
- (England) 1949: Epsom and Ewell, Surrey.
