= Gordon Cochrane (RNZAF officer) =

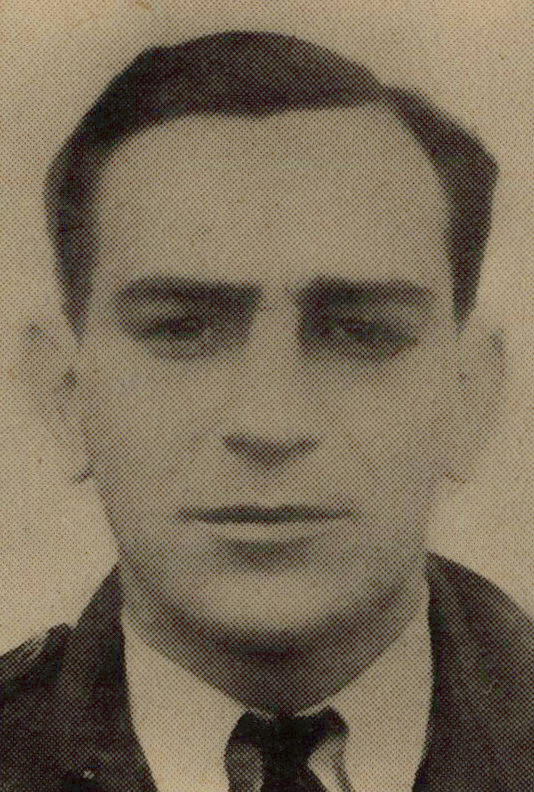
- Born: Alfred William Cochrane; 10 October 1916; Rawene, New Zealand
- Died: 29 October 1994 (aged 78); Wimborne Minster, England
- Military career
- Allegiance: New Zealand
- Branch: Royal New Zealand Air Force
- Service years: 1940–1945
- Rank: Squadron Leader
- Units: No. 150 Squadron RAF; No. 156 Squadron RAF
- Conflicts: Second World War
- Awards: Distinguished Service Order; Distinguished Flying Cross & Two Bars

Alfred William "Gordon" Cochrane, DSO, DFC & Two Bars (10 October 1916 – 29 October 1994) was an officer of the Royal New Zealand Air Force (RNZAF) during the Second World War. He is one of only four New Zealand-born airmen to receive two medal bars to his Distinguished Flying Cross.

== Career ==
Cochrane was born on 10 October 1916 in Rawene, a remote settlement in the Northland Region of New Zealand. After leaving school, he worked in his uncle's general store before enlisting in the Royal New Zealand Air Force in September 1940. By November 1941, he was flying Wellington bombers with No. 156 Squadron RAF and would complete 33 operations including the three thousand-bomber raids of Cologne. In August 1942, Cochrane was awarded an end-of-tour Distinguished Flying Cross (DFC).

After attending an instructors' school, Cochrane spent the next 18 months teaching others how to fly multi-engined aircraft and was then posted to No. 156 Squadron RAF, beginning operations again in June 1944. Over the next 11 months he flew two tours for a total of 55 operations on Lancasters and was frequently the master bomber, directing the markers and main force as he circled the target.

At the end of his second tour in late 1944, Cochrane was awarded the Distinguished Service Order, for displaying the highest standard of skill and courage, involving attacks on a wide range of enemy targets and throughout has displayed outstanding determination and devotion to duty. In early 1945, Cochrane was awarded a Bar to his DFC following a daylight raid over Düsseldorf. He was over the target for seven minutes before the main stream arrived and was hit by flak. A lump of iron burst through the nose of the aircraft and ricocheted around the interior causing damage. Despite this, Cochrane continued to direct the attacking bombers for a further seven minutes before turning for home. His citation read in part that Cochrane was a cool and courageous captain and pilot, whose fine qualities of leadership and determination have been well instilled in many operations against the enemy.

A second bar to Cochrane's DFC was won in even more stressful circumstances. On the night of 7/8 February 1945, he controlled the bombing of two fortified towns standing in the path of British troops massing to cross the German frontier. Soon after reaching the target, the port wing of the aircraft sustained severe damage and part of it fell off. The citation stated that; "Undeterred, Squadron Leader Cochrane, with superb airmanship and courage, continued with his task".

Cochrane ended the war as an acclaimed pathfinder captain, with three tours and 88 operations behind him. He was one among the most highly decorated New Zealander bomber pilots. After the war Cochrane remained in Britain, joining BOAC, the forerunner of British Airways. Cochrane flew Yorks, Hermes, Stratocruisers and Comets before becoming a Boeing 707 captain in 1964. He retired at the end of 1971 as a senior captain with 25 years service. Cochrane died in Wimborne Minster, England in 1994 aged 78.
