= Louis Parore =

Louis Wellington Parore (26 December 1888 – 3 March 1953), also known as Lou Parore, was a New Zealand Māori leader, interpreter and court agent. Descended from Māori heritage, he identified with the Ngāpuhi and Te Roroa iwi. He was born at Te Houhanga Marae, Northland, New Zealand in 1888.
