= RAF Wyton Area Voluntary Band =

Band of the Royal Air Force

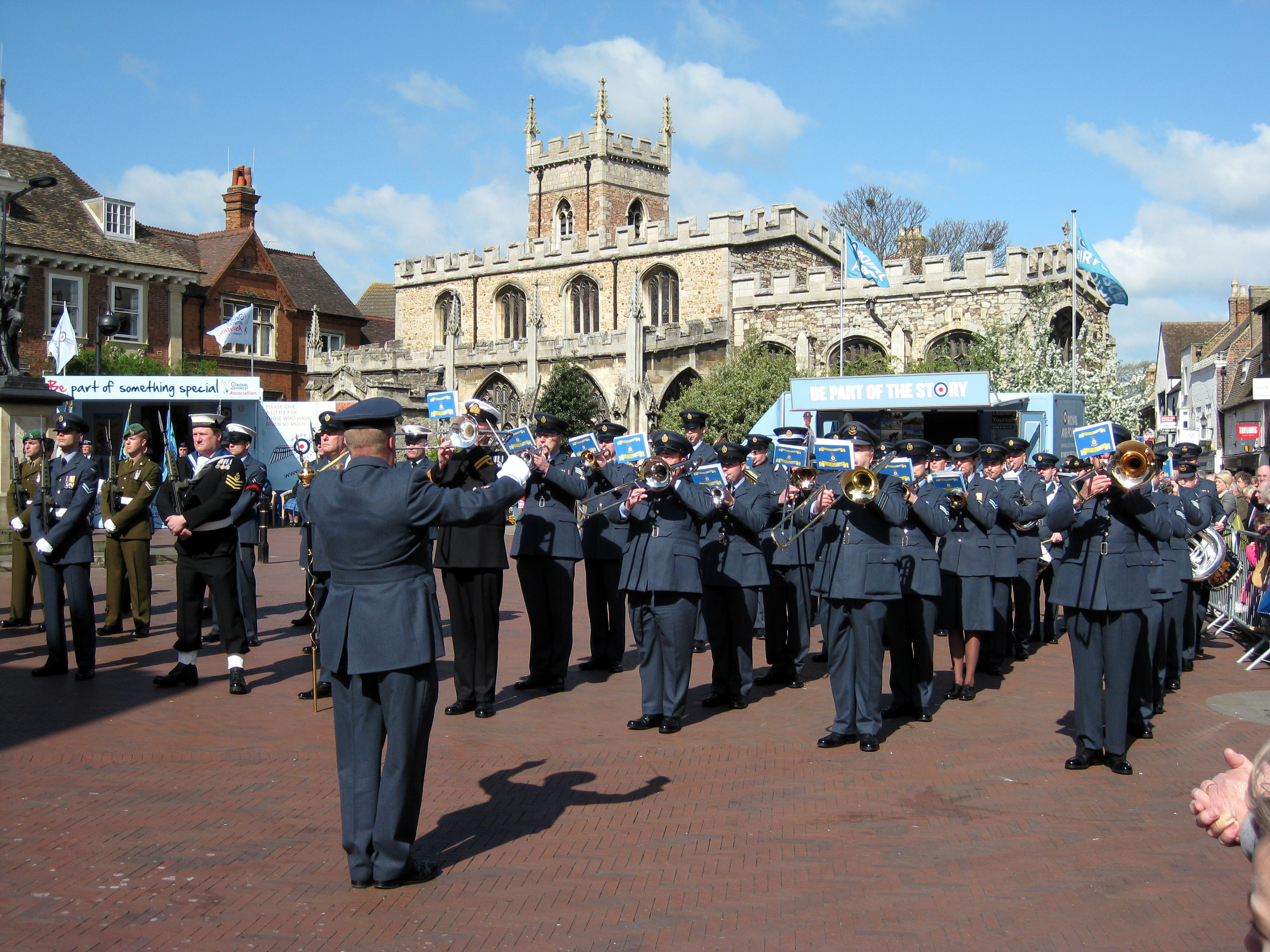
RAF Wyton AVB perform during the RAF Wyton and Brampton Freedom of Huntingdon parade on 12 April 2011.

RAF Wyton Area Voluntary Band is one of eight Voluntary bands within the Royal Air Force providing musical support to the RAF and local communities. Founded in 1955, the military band is based at RAF Wyton in Cambridgeshire and is under the administration of RAF Brampton Wyton Henlow. Its membership consists of volunteer musicians from local RAF stations (Wyton, Brampton, Henlow, Cottesmore, Marham and Wittering) and members of the local community.

The concert band appear regularly at military events, civic parades, church services and charity concerts, largely in the East of England, although the band have also performed in London and Birmingham, and toured in Cyprus. The band also have a big band, "Rhythm in Blue", and can also provide a fanfare team, and clarinet or brass quintets. Under bandmaster Colin Swaep, they have produced a number of widely available CDs.

On 28 February 2015 RAF Wyton Area Voluntary Band became the first of the RAF Voluntary Bands to ever perform alongside the Central Band of the Royal Air Force.

== See also ==
- RAF Waddington Voluntary band, the band for Central England.
