= RAF Voluntary Bands =

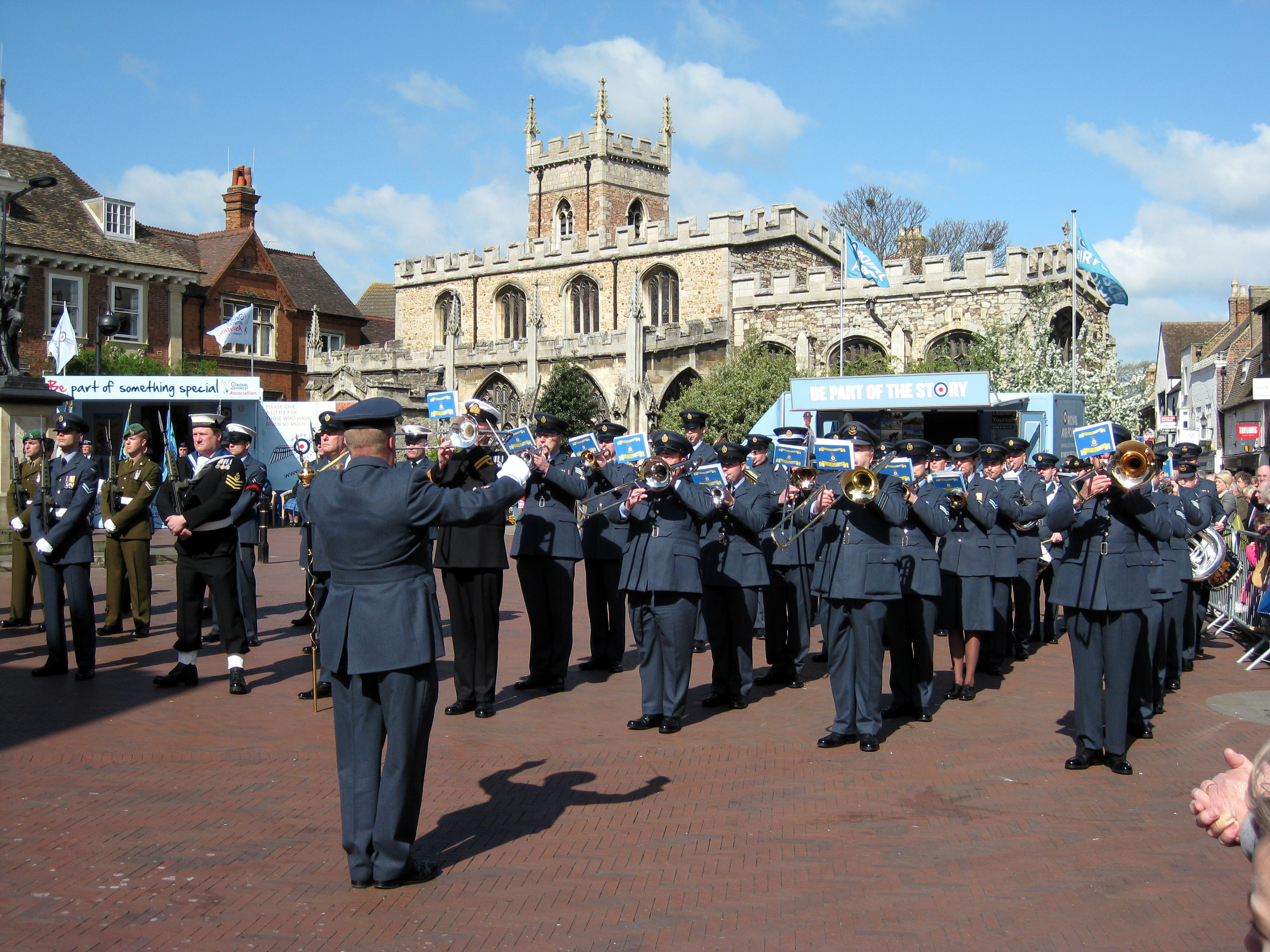
RAF Wyton AVB perform during the RAF Wyton and Brampton Freedom of Huntingdon parade on 12 April 2011.

RAF Voluntary Bands are voluntary military, brass or pipe bands that provide music for ceremonial and social occasions within the Royal Air Force, as well as local and national charities. In contrast to the RAF's professional musical bands (the RAF Central Band, the RAF Regiment Band and the RAF College Band), the bands are formed of volunteer musicians from RAF stations, other services and members of the local community.

== RAF Voluntary Bands Association ==
Numerous bands were founded at the formation of the RAF on 1 April 1918. Several can trace their roots to Royal Naval Air Service and Royal Flying Corps volunteer musicians. The bands are centrally administered through the RAF Voluntary Band Association which, co-ordinates policy and activities and represents its members on those occasions when they are called upon to participate in major public events. Each of the current nine voluntary bands in the RAF are located on a geographical basis at stations throughout the United Kingdom and Cyprus:

- RAF Akrotiri (Cyprus)
- RAF Brize Norton (Oxfordshire)
- RAF Cosford (Midlands)
- RAF Halton (London)
- RAF Honington (East Anglia)
- RAF Lossiemouth (Scotland)
- RAF St Athan (Wales)
- RAF Waddington Voluntary Band (Central England)
- RAF Wyton Area Voluntary Band (Eastern England)

To celebrate the 90th Anniversary of the RAF in 2008, a massed band event featuring members from all bands was held at Symphony Hall, Birmingham.

== RAF Pipe Bands Association ==
There are five voluntary RAF pipe bands spread across the UK: three in Scotland and two in England. These are administered through the RAF Pipe Bands Association These are currently located at:

- RAF Halton
- RAF Kinloss
- RAF Leuchars
- RAF Lossiemouth
- RAF Waddington

The pipe bands compete in several contests, and the Pipe Band Association holds its own annual contest for members which includes solo events as well as band contests.

== See also ==
- RAF Music Services
