= RAF Stanbridge =

Former RAF station in Bedfordshire, England

RAF Stanbridge RAF Leighton Buzzard
- Near Leighton Buzzard, Bedfordshire in England
- Guide and Sustain

Site information
- Type: Communications station and logistics centre
- Owner: Ministry of Defence (MOD)
- Operator: Royal Air Force
- Condition: Closed

Location
- Location within Bedfordshire RAF Stanbridge (the United Kingdom)
- Coordinates: 51°54′39″N 000°38′20″W

Site history
- Built: 1939
- In use: 1939-2013
- Fate: Site sold by MOD for redevelopment, station buildings demolished.

RAF Stanbridge (originally RAF Leighton Buzzard) was a non-flying RAF station situated on the outskirts of Leighton Buzzard, Bedfordshire, England and located 1.6 miles (2.6 km) west of the village of Stanbridge, Bedfordshire.

For the majority of its life the station operated as a communications station. In its latter years it had a logistics and supply role. The station closed in 2013 and declared surplus to military requirements by the Ministry of Defence. The site was sold to property developers and all station buildings were demolished so it could be redeveloped for residential use.

== History ==
=== RAF Leighton Buzzard ===
RAF Leighton Buzzard was created to be the main Central Exchange and Wireless Telegraph station for the RAF's telephone and telegraph network, which had been established from 1936. The site was chosen for its good wireless reception, proximity to the existing GPO trunk telephone network, and lack of other apparent military significance. It became operational in May 1939, with a staff of about 600 servicemen and women.

=== Second World War ===
During the Second World War the station was a major base for secret communication traffic. A large number of tunnels filled with what was state-of-the art equipment were used to protect the equipment. It handled "practically the whole of the national landline teleprinter communications and a large part of the private speech telephone system", together with the wireless transmission and reception of all RAF international communications. It has been described as in 1942 "the largest telephone exchange in the world".

=== Cold War ===
Renamed RAF Stanbridge after the war, the station continued to be the hub of the RAF's communication network. In 1959, as the RAF's Central Signals Centre, it was dealing with 10,000 messages a day: 5,500 domestic and 4,500 international. It later became designated the Communications Control Centre (CCC or Commcen Central), at the heart of the Defence Communications Network (DCN), established in 1969.

During the Cold War the station was still used as a vital communications base.

In the early 1970s RAF Stanbridge had satellite sites at RAF Bampton Castle (Receiver site), RAF Weyhill (Transmitter site), RAF Edlesborough (Transmitter site), RAF Greatworth (transmitter site) and RAF Stoke Hammond (Receiver site). Stanbridge was then known as the Communications Control Centre (CCC or Commcen Central) and was the hub of the Defence Communications Network (DCN). The main building hosted Systems Control, a tape relay centre (Main Hall), in which were based several banks of TASS transmit positions (Telegraph Automatic Switching System) and later a secure Telegraphic Automatic Routing Equipment (TARE). All of these methods of communication depended on paper tapes which were punched with Murray Code. A secure Comms cell which was used to communicate by morse with deployed detachments worldwide as an emergency means of communication was located next to the local traffic office. The DCN connected sites all over the world by HF radio links using the two diverse transmitter sites and the diverse receiver sites. The Distant Terminals of these links included Canberra, Gan, Cyprus, Ottawa and Malta. Other UK sites involved were the RN site at HMS Forest Moor and RAF Oakhanger with its satellite earth-station.

- RAF Bampton Castle was a technical site only, equipped with HF radio receivers and an aerial farm and parented by RAF Brize Norton.
- RAF Edlesborough was a technical site only, equipped with HF radio transmitters and a large aerial farm and parented by RAF Stanbridge.
- RAF Stoke Hammond was a technical site only, equipped with HF radio receivers and an aerial farm and parented by RAF Stanbridge. It closed in the mid 1970s and the site was returned to the owner, leaving Bampton Castle as the only receiver site.
- RAF Greatworth had its own accommodation but was administratively parented from RAF Stanbridge. Like Edlesborough it was an HF radio transmitter site with a large aerial farm. The site opened in the 1930s and finally closed in 1992. It is now an industrial park known as Greatworth Park.

These sites were equipped with radio equipment made by Marconi and Racal. During the 1970s the transmitters used were the Marconi HS series (HS31, HS51 and HS71) and their more modern MST series. The power of these transmitters ranged from 1 kW up to 30 kW and the two transmitter sites operated as a RED path and a YELLOW path to provide diversity to cope with atmospheric conditions, HF radio being at the mercy of the ionosphere. Aerials were of the dipole, rhombic or biconical designs being usually fed via twin wire feeders.

By the mid 1980s, with its original equipment obsolete, the station was very run down; but in 1987 the station took on a new role, with its main building substantially rebuilt, when the RAF Supply Control Centre (RAFSCC) was relocated from RAF Hendon to RAF Stanbridge, along with the Joint Services Air Trooping Centre (JSATC). In this role it housed the RAF's Supply Central Computer System, responsible for tracking logistics and supplies records for the RAF all across the world. Administratively the station was latterly grouped under RAF Henlow and then under RAF Brampton Wyton Henlow.

=== Post Cold War ===
RAF Stanbridge ceased to be an independent station on 31 March 1995, becoming a satellite station of RAF Henlow, located approximately 16 miles (26 km) to the north east.

Prior to 1999, RAF Stanbridge was responsible for providing Communications Support to its now closed satellite site at RAF Edlesborough.

The base was one of the smallest RAF Stations having only two Station buildings and 24 married quarters. It was part of a bigger site which was sold off by the Ministry of Defence (MoD) in 1999.

The Supply Control Centre work was contracted out in 2011 to Boeing Defence UK at Milton Keynes, other functions having been outsourced in the 1990s. RAF Stanbridge was deemed redundant, and closed the following year. The station's remaining buildings were demolished in 2016.

The site was closed in March 2013, but the formal closure ceremony happened during June 2012 with the personnel and families moving to RAF Wyton. The last station commander was Wing Commander M. G. Brown MBE MSc BEng RAF.

== Post military use ==
An archaeological deskbase assessment of RAF Stanbridge was completed in 2011.

In early 2016 planning permission was received, the RAF buildings filled in and/or demolished and work was begun in building houses and a 'Co-op local' convenience store. (April 2016)

Building work on the housing development commenced, but due to contractor issues is currently at a standstill. As part of the new development a local shop has been built and opened run by the Co-op. (November 2016)

== See also ==
- List of Royal Air Force stations
- List of former Royal Air Force stations
