= Headquarters Music Services =

Headquarters Music Services (HQMS) is the entity that oversees all three military bands in the Royal Air Force (RAF). The Central Band with the RAF Salon Orchestra, the Band of the RAF Regiment and the Band of the RAF College. Acting as the RAF's version of the British Army's Royal Corps of Army Music, it is part of Royal Air Force Music Services, which is the larger organizational body for RAF bands.

The HQMS also provides training courses to all musical personnel and overseers the introduction of new personnel into RAF bands. The HQMS is based out of RAF Northolt in Greater London. The Principal Director of Music, currently Wing Commander Piers Morrell, is the officer in charge of RAF Music Services. In May 2023, he directed the fanfare trumpeters of the Royal Air Force at the 2023 Coronation. Wg Cdr Morrell is accompanied by Squadron Leader Richard Murray as Director of Music for HQMS, as well as an exec team of 1 Warrant Officer, 5 Flight Sergeants, 1 Sergeant & 1 Corporal who are all musicians and two civilians.

Since 1951, bronze and silver medals have been awarded to music students by the HQMS.
