= Duncan Stubbs =

British musician (born 1961)

Wing Commander Duncan Joseph George Stubbs (born 4th August 1961) is the former Principal Director of Music for the RAF Music Services.

Stubbs joined the Royal Air force in 1983, initially as a member of the service's Central Band. He was granted a commission as a flying officer in March 1990.
