= Band of the Royal Air Force Regiment =

Band of the Royal Air Force

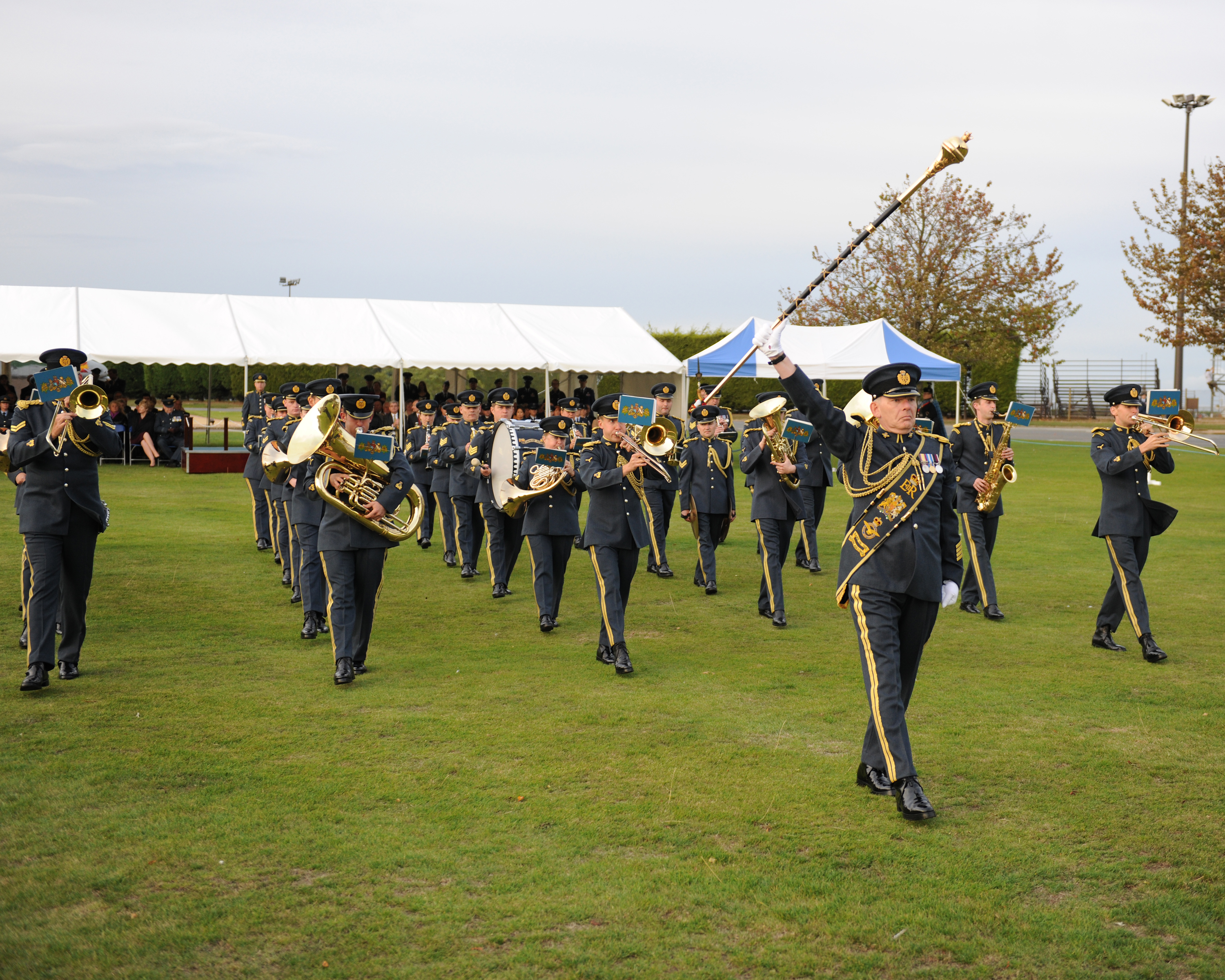
The Band of the RAF Regiment

The Band of the Royal Air Force Regiment is based at RAF Northolt, and is one of three established bands in the Royal Air Force and the music ensemble of the Royal Air Force Regiment.

== History ==
Originally formed from the Coastal Command Band in 1942 at RAF Belton Park, the band is now administered by RAF Music Services. The Band takes part in major events such as The Changing of the Guard at Buckingham Palace and the Edinburgh Military Tattoo, as well as a busy schedule of services and charity engagements.

In the past, the band was based at RAF Catterick from 1946 until 1994. It then moved four times, until 1999 it moved to RAF Cranwell where it worked alongside The Band of the Royal Air Force College. In 2015, as part of the rebrigade of Royal Air Force Music Services, it moved to RAF Northolt.

In October 2007 it featured on Radio 2's Friday Night is Music Night with the BBC Concert Orchestra.
