= RAF Brampton =

Former RAF Base in Cambridgeshire, England

RAF Brampton
- Brampton, Cambridgeshire in England
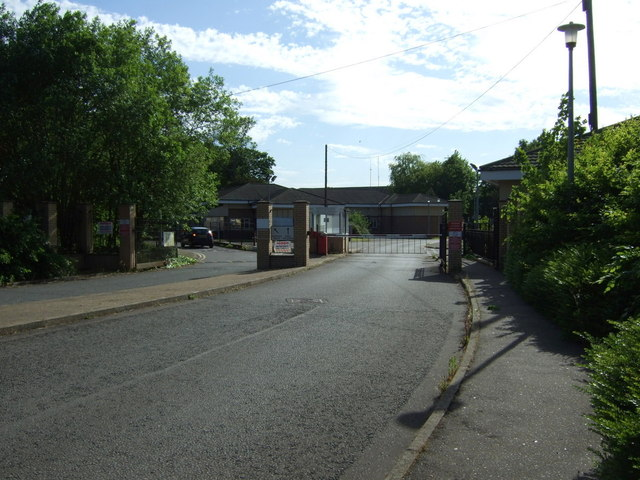
- The entrance to former RAF Brampton in 2015.

- Pride in Service

Site information
- Type: Non-flying support station
- Owner: Ministry of Defence (MOD)
- Operator: Royal Air Force (1939–2012); Joint Forces Command (2012–2013)
- Condition: Closed

Location
- Location within Cambridgeshire RAF Brampton (the United Kingdom)
- Coordinates: 52°18′56″N 000°13′40″W
- Area: 32 hectares (79 acres)

Site history
- Built: 1955
- In use: 1955–2012
- Fate: Transferred to Joint Forces Command in 2012 and became Brampton Camp.; Site subsequently sold by MOD for redevelopment, station buildings demolished during 2016/17.

RAF Brampton was a non-flying Royal Air Force station near Huntingdon in Cambridgeshire, England. Formerly the home of RAF Support Command, it also became the home of several elements of Defence Equipment & Support (DE&S), which itself was a result of a merger between the Defence Logistics Organisation (DLO) and the Defence Procurement Agency (DPA), and provided a base for the Defence Security & Assurance Services and Defence Estates.

It was part of the combined station RAF Brampton Wyton Henlow but this was disbanded on 2 April 2012 and the station was renamed Brampton Camp, losing its status as an RAF station and coming under the control of Joint Forces Command and RAF Wyton. The camp was closed at the end of 2013 and all assets were transferred to a new JFIG Pathfinder building at RAF Wyton.

== History ==
The site was used during the First World War, when Lord Mandeville (who owned the site) agreed to its use to house German prisoners of war. After this, Lord Mandeville let the site for domestic use. During the early years of the Second World War, the site was used to house babies and children evacuated from London. In 1942, the United States Army Air Force First Bomb Wing Headquarters was established on the site and it was used to billet American airmen. In September 1945, the USAAF moved out to what was RAF Alconbury, to the north of the Brampton site.

The Royal Air Force Technical Training Command billeted staff at RAF Brampton (then known as Brampton Park) whilst the Command HQ was located at Brampton Grange, a large house that dates back to 1773. In 1955, Brampton Park became RAF Brampton and units began to be located there rather than just personnel. Units included the Central Reconnaissance Establishment, which was formed at Brampton in January 1957.

In 1953, JARIC (UK) was established and it moved, in 1956, with other elements to the recently formed RAF Brampton. JARIC stayed at Brampton for 57 years with various name changes before departing RAF Brampton for RAF Wyton in 2013.

In 1955, RAF Wyton was granted the Freedom of the Borough of Huntingdon and 40 years later, this privilege was extended to the staff at RAF Brampton.

Between 1976 and 1979 the station had two gate guardian aircraft - a Gnat (tail number XR571) and a Jet Provost (tail number XN602), representing the presence on the base of RAF Support Command. After they were removed, the base had no gate guardian until Phantom XT914 was installed in 1997.

In June 1977, the Support and Training Commands were unified to form RAF Support Command at Brampton. Support command occupied a large building in the centre of the base that caught fire in October 1985. Staff were moved to empty families' quarters on the base and contingencies were implemented; when Air Marshal Sir John Sutton was appointed Commander in January 1986, he was faced with a burnt out HQ which would eventually cost £10 million to fix. On 1 April 1994, Support Command was combined with Personnel and Logistics staff to form Personnel and Training Command (at RAF Innsworth) and RAF Logistics Command at RAF Brampton.

Originally, RAF Brampton, RAF Wyton and RAF Henlow were separate stations. However, in the mid-1990s, with the closure of RAF Logistics Command then at Brampton, and the cessation of operational flying from Wyton, the two stations amalgamated to become Brampton Wyton. Henlow joined the group in 2001, and brought with it RAF Stanbridge, to produce the largest station in terms of both geography and number of personnel in the RAF. The station stretches from Brampton and Wyton, around 7 miles (11 km) apart, in the north, southwards around 30 miles (48 km) to Henlow, and then westwards some 20 miles (32 km) (towards Leighton Buzzard) to Stanbridge.

However, in 2009, an MoD review decided that Brampton was surplus to requirements because a new intelligence centre (DIFC) would be built at nearby RAF Wyton. The tri-station amalgamation was disbanded on 2 April 2012 and RAF Brampton was renamed Brampton Camp, losing its status as an RAF station and coming under the control of Joint Forces Command and RAF Wyton.

== Closure ==
In March 2012, the gate guardian – a McDonnell Douglas F-4 Phantom II aircraft with tail number XT914 – was removed from RAF Brampton and transported to Wattisham airfield in Suffolk. The Phantom had previously flown in two of the squadrons based at what was RAF Wattisham (No. 56 Squadron RAF and No. 74 Squadron RAF) in the 1980s and 90s. It had been a gate guardian at RAF Leeming, North Yorkshire until 1997 when it was moved to Brampton.

The station closed at the end of 2013 with large scale demolition of the buildings taking place in 2016 and into 2017. The site is being cleared to make way for housing but some of the buildings and trees on the site are protected. There are plans for between 400 and 500 homes on the site. Military housing was kept on the site for a further three years with a gradual rundown until all staff were transferred to RAF Wyton. The 95 homes left at Brampton were then bought up by a company who rent them out. Controversially, the Brampton Park Little Theatre on the base was approved for demolition in 2014. The building had been used as a cinema since the 1950s and had also been available for public use despite being on a military base. Support to keep the theatre had come from Joanna Lumley and Ian McKellen, but along with other non-listed buildings on the base, it was demolished.

== Airfield ==
Brampton never had an airfield, although Wyton and Henlow used to. RAF Wyton was used by No. 57 Squadron RAF, Cambridge and London University Air Squadrons and 5 AEF flying the Grob Tutor, before they were transferred to RAF Wittering in 2014 apart from No. 57 squadron which was transferred to RAF Cranwell. RAF Henlow is used by 616 Volunteer Gliding Squadron flying the Grob Vigilant and leased out as a general aviation airfield.

== Operational units ==
- Joint Air Reconnaissance Intelligence Centre (JARIC) – became part of DGIFC (later DIFC)
- Defence Equipment and Support (DE&S)
- Defence Logistics Organisation (DLO) – became part of DE&S
- Defence Security & Assurance Services

The station was for many years home to JARIC – The National Imagery Exploitation Centre, which produced intelligence from all forms of imagery, and trained Service personnel to provide intelligence in support of operations. This was moved to RAF Wyton in September 2013 under the Defence Intelligence Fusion Centre (DIFC).
