= Roy Giles =

Roy Giles is an academic and recognised expert on counterterrorism, as well as a former colonel in the British Army.

During his Army career, Giles served with the British liaison mission to the Group of Soviet Forces in Germany commonly known as BRIXMIS. He formed and led the Joint Arms Control Implementation Group, declared operational by the Ministry of Defence on 1 January 1991. He later continued research into similar topics at the UK's Defence Evaluation and Research Agency (DERA).
