= RAF Waddington Voluntary Band =

The Royal Air Force Waddington Voluntary Band is the largest of the RAF's eight voluntary bands. It has been based at RAF Waddington for a number of years although it was previously based at RAF Scampton. The band currently has a membership of approximately 60 musicians. In the history of Voluntary Bands, membership been open to only serving members of the RAF who would play as a secondary duty. Modern Voluntary Bands have a wide range of members including serving members as well as retired service personnel, local civilians, students and many dependents. The band openly welcomes enquiries from all members of the public and RAF looking for more information on joining.

In addition, the base also has a separate voluntary pipe band, RAF Waddington Pipes and Drums, which won the 2009 RAF Pipe Band Championships.

== Ensembles ==
The main band is a Military Band, although this is style of ensemble now more commonly referred to as a concert or wind band. Some of the larger works recently performed by the band include The Light Cavalry Overture and Crown Imperial. The band also enjoys performing a number of selections including show music and jazz standards. All these are included in regular concerts in and around the county and wider.

Other ensembles the band have available to provide for engagements are a Woodwind Quintet, Clarinet Quartet and a Brass Quintet. These smaller ensembles contained within the organisation play a vital role by attending smaller functions that. The Saxophone Ensemble have had the privilege of playing in the British embassy in Washington D.C. and other functions in the US capitol.

== Events and recordings ==
The band performs at many events annually as well as a large number of dinner nights and concerts around the country. Regular events where the band can be seen include the Freedom of Lincoln Parade, the Lincolnshire Festival of Remembrance, the RAF Conningsby Battle of Britain Parade and the RAF Waddington International Airshow

Under the leadership of Bandmaster David Jackson, the band has produced a number of widely available recordings - Eye in the Sky (2005) and Wings Over Lincoln (2008). These include a selection of popular music ranging from James Bond themes to traditional military marches.

== See also ==
- RAF Wyton Area Voluntary Band, the band for Eastern England.
