= Joint Arms Control Implementation Group =

British military defence component

- JACIG badge
- Active: 1990 – present
- Country: United Kingdom
- Branch: Royal Air Force; British Army
- Type: Joint unit
- Role: Arms control and verification
- Size: HQ and deployable teams
- Part of: Strategic Command
- Location: JACIG Arms Control Centre, RAF Henlow, Bedfordshire
- Motto(s): Per Fidem Mutuam Securitas (Latin for 'Security Through Mutual Trust')

Commanders
- Inaugural commander: Colonel Roy Giles

Insignia
- Abbreviation: JACIG

The Joint Arms Control Implementation Group (JACIG) is a specialist defence component affiliated to UK Strategic Command which carries out a range of arms control and verification functions (including inspection, evaluation, escort and training duties).

== History ==
JACIG was originally based at RAF Scampton (just north of Lincoln); established in 1990, it was declared by the MOD as operational on 1 January 1991. Originally it was formed to performing treaty associated tasks as part of the UK's commitment to post Cold War confidence building associated with the Vienna Document and the Treaty on Conventional Armed Forces in Europe (CFE Treaty). Its operating base is currently RAF Henlow in Bedfordshire.

JACIG's first Commandant and main architect of the unit's structure and method of operations was Colonel Roy Giles. Giles was a veteran of BRIXMIS. The unit's personnel are drawn from all three UK armed services and the MOD Civil Service.

JACIG has carried out the following duties since its inception and continues to play an active role in constructive disarmament:

- Hundreds of inspections or visits related to arms control treaties, such as the revised CFE treaty and its adaption discussed in the 1999 Istanbul summit
- Confidence and security building evaluations and inspection supporting the Vienna Document 2011
- A number of missions related to the Open Skies treaty
- A variety of bilateral activities, outside formal treaty requirements, designed to foster good working relationships with a number of OSCE nations
- Developing capabilities in a range of conventional weapons conventions and treaty implementation including SALW reduction in former conflict zones
- Language training and arms control inspectors' courses
- Lecturing at overseas institutions
- Providing technical expert advice in a variety of forums.

As well as carrying site inspections, unit and area visits to confirm the correct reporting or destruction of treaty limited equipment, JACIG also provides escorts to incoming foreign counterpart organisations. The unit has also become more involved in the setting up and implementation of treaties and agreements to destroy and limit the use of small arms and light weapons (SALW).
