= RAF Northolt =

Royal Air Force station in Greater London, England

RAF Northolt
- Ruislip, Greater London in England
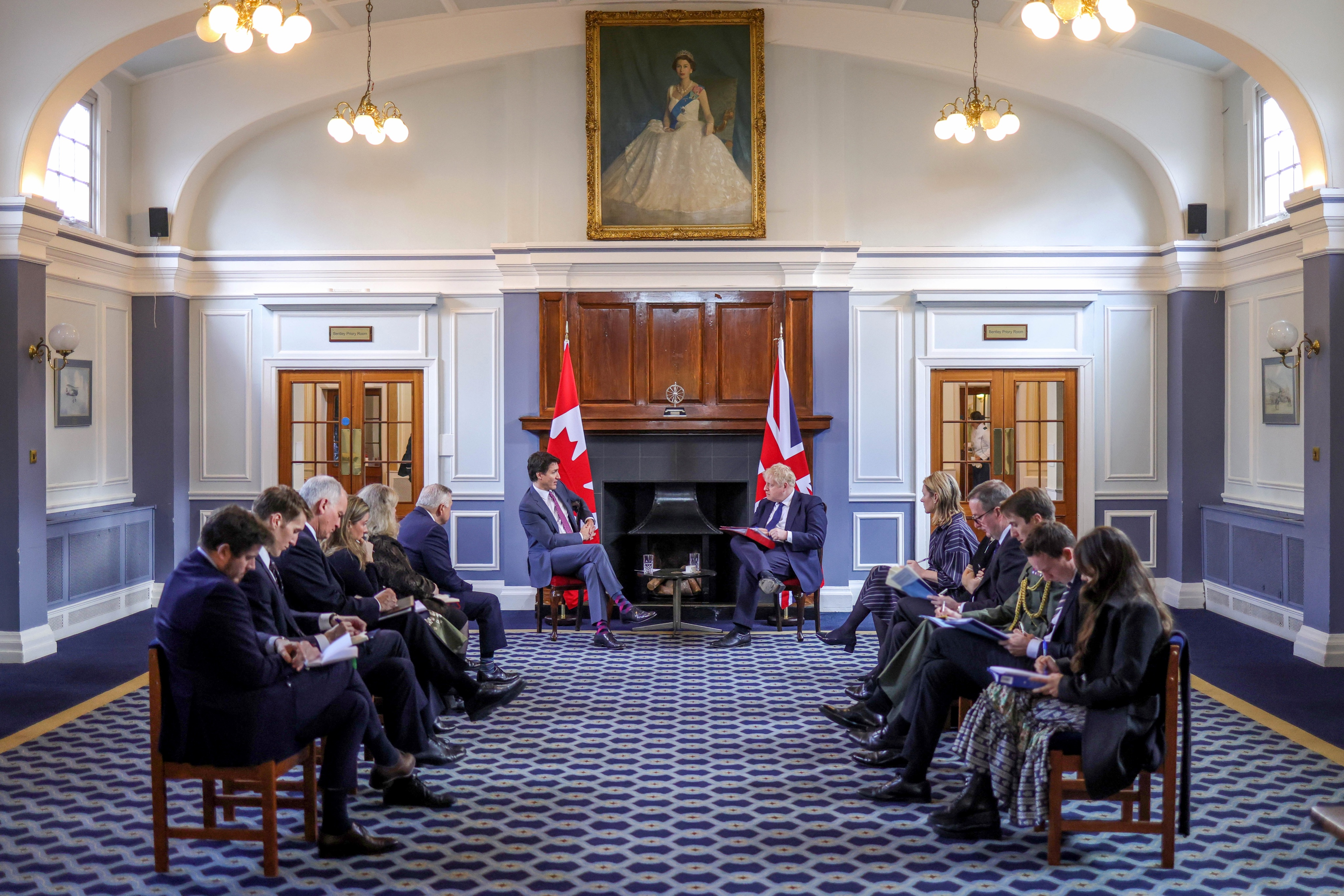
- Prime Minister Boris Johnson holding a bilateral summit with the Prime Minister of Canada, Justin Trudeau, inside the RAF Northolt Officers' Mess, 7 March 2022

- Latin: Aut portare aut pugnare prompti ("Ready to carry or to fight")

Site information
- Type: Royal Air Force station
- Owner: Ministry of Defence
- Operator: Royal Air Force
- Controlled by: No. 2 Group (Air Combat Support)
- Open to the public: no
- Website: Official website

Location
- Shown within Greater London
- Coordinates: 51°33′11″N 000°25′06″W

Site history
- Built: 1915
- In use: 1915–present

Garrison information
- Occupants: No. 32 (The Royal) Squadron; No. 63 Squadron RAF Regiment; No. 600 Squadron (RAuxAF); No. 38 Expeditionary Air Wing; HQ RAF Music Services; Central Band of the RAF; Band of the Royal Air Force Regiment; 621 Explosive Ordnance Disposal Squadron; British Forces Post Office; No. 1 Aeronautical Information Documents Unit; 14F Northolt Squadron Air Cadets; Service Prosecution Authority

Airfield information
- Identifiers: IATA: NHT, ICAO: EGWU, WMO: 03672
- Elevation: 126 ft (38 m) AMSL
Runways
| Direction | Length and surface |
|---|---|
| 07/25 | 1,683 m (5,522 ft) Grooved asphalt |
- Source: RAF Northolt Defence Aerodrome Manual

Royal Air Force Northolt or more simply RAF Northolt (IATA: NHT, ICAO: EGWU) is a Royal Air Force station in South Ruislip, 2 nautical miles (3.7 km; 2.3 mi) from Uxbridge in the London Borough of Hillingdon, western Greater London, England, approximately 6 mi (10 km) north of Heathrow Airport. As London VIP Airport, the station handles many private civil flights (private planes of up to 29 passengers) in addition to Air Force flights.

Northolt has one runway in operation, spanning 1,683 m × 40 m (5,522 ft × 131 ft), with a grooved asphalt surface. This airport is used for government and private VIP transport to and from London.

Northolt predates the establishment of the Royal Air Force by almost three years, having opened in May 1915, making it the oldest RAF base. Originally established for the Royal Flying Corps, it has the longest history of continuous use of any RAF airfield. Before the outbreak of the Second World War, the station was the first to take delivery of the Hawker Hurricane. The station played a key role during the Battle of Britain, when fighters from several of its units, including No. 303 Polish Fighter Squadron, engaged enemy aircraft as part of the defence of London. It became the first base to have squadrons operating Supermarine Spitfire aircraft within German airspace.

During the construction of Heathrow Airport, Northolt was used for commercial civil flights, becoming the busiest airport in Europe for a time and a major base for British European Airways. More recently the station has become the hub of British military flying operations in the London area. Northolt has been extensively redeveloped since 2006 to accommodate these changes, becoming home to the British Forces Post Office, which moved to a newly constructed headquarters and sorting office on the site. Units currently based at RAF Northolt are No. 32 (The Royal) Squadron, the King's Colour Squadron, 600 (City of London) Squadron, No 1 Aeronautical Information Documents Unit, the Air Historical Branch and the Central Band of the RAF.

== History ==
=== Construction ===
Following Louis Blériot's first flight across the English Channel in 1909, the British Army considered the necessity of defending the United Kingdom from a future air attack. By May 1910, Claude Grahame-White and other aviation pioneers were flying from the flat areas around Ruislip, although they soon sought an aerodrome for London, which was eventually built at Hendon. A proposal was made in 1912 for the area around where RAF Northolt now stands to be developed as "Harrow Aerodrome". The company established to develop the site was listed on the London Stock Exchange but the idea did not progress any further.

The outbreak of the First World War necessitated a new aerodrome for the Royal Flying Corps. The Corps had received the Royal Warrant on 13 April 1912, whereupon Major Sefton Brancker of the War Office conducted aerial surveys in 1914 of Glebe Farm in Ickenham, and Hundred Acres Farm and Down Barnes Farm in Ruislip, looking for the most effective operating base for new squadrons. He settled on a site near Northolt Junction railway station; in January 1915 the government requisitioned the land. It is rumoured that the government official tasked with acquiring the land arrived at the site with his map upside down, leading to the government requisitioning and developing land on the wrong side of the railway line, including the old Hill Farm.

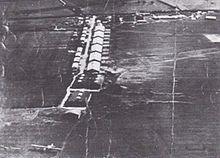
Easterly view of the aerodrome in 1917

Construction of the new aerodrome, to be named "RFC Military School, Ruislip", began in January 1915. It opened on 3 May 1915, becoming known as Northolt and home to No. 4 Reserve Aeroplane Squadron which relocated from Farnborough. Most early RAF airfields were named after the nearest railway station, in this case Northolt Junction, later named Northolt Halt and now South Ruislip station; so the airfield became "Northolt" despite being in neighbouring South Ruislip. In the same year the airfield was extended westwards, and aircraft began flying sorties in defence of London against Zeppelin raids. No. 18 Squadron was formed in the same month as Northolt and equipped with Bleriot Experimental biplanes, whose slow speed led to heavy losses in combat with the German Fliegertruppe.

In 1916, No. 43 Squadron was formed under the command of Major Sholto Douglas. Aircraft equipping the squadron included the Sopwith 1½ Strutter, built by the Fairey Aviation company, then in Hayes. The Strutter made its first test flight from Northolt in 1916 with Harry Hawker at the controls. Fairey conducted test flights at Northolt from 1917 until 1928 when the Air Ministry gave the company notice to vacate the aerodrome. Flights later resumed from the Great West Aerodrome owned by Fairey in Harmondsworth, which was eventually developed as Heathrow Airport. No. 43 Squadron went on to fly sorties over France from 17 January 1917, taking part in the Battle of Vimy Ridge between 4 and 8 April 1917.

No. 600 Squadron and No. 601 Squadron of the fledgling Royal Auxiliary Air Force were formed at Northolt in 1925 under the command of Squadron Leader Lord Edward Grosvenor. Both squadrons were deployed to RAF Hendon in 1927, although 600 Squadron returned in 1939. The Prince of Wales, later King Edward VIII and subsequently the Duke of Windsor, made his first flight in a Bristol F.2 Fighter from Northolt on 27 April 1929.

=== Second World War and the Battle of Britain ===
303 Polish Squadron pilots (May 1942, RAF Northolt) (Note: Appearing in photograph, L-R: Sgt. Stasik, P/O Socha, P/O Kolecki, F/O Lipiński, F/O Horbaczewski, F/O Schmidt, F/Sgt Giermar (on the wing), Flt Lt Zumbach, Sqn Ldr Kołaczewski, Flt Lt Żak, F/Sgt Popek, F/O Bieńkowski, F/O Kłosin, F/O Kolubiński, F/Sgt Karczmarz, F/Sgt Sochacki, F/Sgt Wojciechowski and on the propeller F/O Głowacki.)

Northolt became an active base during the Second World War for Royal Air Force and Polish Air Force squadrons in their defence of the United Kingdom. It was the first RAF station to operate the Hawker Hurricane, with No. 111 Squadron receiving the first four aircraft in December 1937, and reaching its full complement by February 1938. In the lead-up to war, the RAF implemented a policy of adding concrete runways to important airfields; by 1939 Northolt had a new 800-by-50-yard (732 by 46 m) concrete runway. Later in 1939 RAF Hendon became one of its satellite airfields. Polish pilots were taught English at RAF Uxbridge, where they also practised formation flying using tricycles with radios, compasses and speed indicators.

On 15 September 1940 during the Battle of Britain, No. 1 Squadron RCAF, No. 229 Squadron, No. 303 Polish Fighter Squadron, No. 504 Squadron, and part of No. 264 Squadron were based at the station, all under the control of No. 11 Group RAF, headquartered at RAF Uxbridge. All flew Hawker Hurricanes except No. 264 Squadron's contingent, which operated the Boulton Paul Defiant. During the Battle of Britain, Polish 303 Squadron was the highest scoring Hurricane Sqd in Fighter Command, with its Czech pilot Sergeant Josef František becoming the fourth highest scoring RAF "ace" during the battle. The Luftwaffe bombed the airfield in August 1940 as well as other sector airfields in the area, including Biggin Hill, Hornchurch and North Weald, as part of a concentrated effort against the airfields and sector stations of No. 11 Group RAF. A total of 4,000 bombs were recorded as falling within two miles (3 km) of the airfield over a fifteen-month period, although only two were recorded as hitting the airfield itself. Under the leadership of the station commander, Group Captain Stanley Vincent, the airfield was camouflaged to resemble civil housing. Vincent had been concerned that camouflaging the airfield as open land would look too suspicious from the air; Northolt was surrounded by housing and so a large open area would draw attention. A fake stream was painted across the main runway while the hangars were decorated to look like houses and gardens. The result was so effective that pilots flying to Northolt from other airfields often struggled to find it.

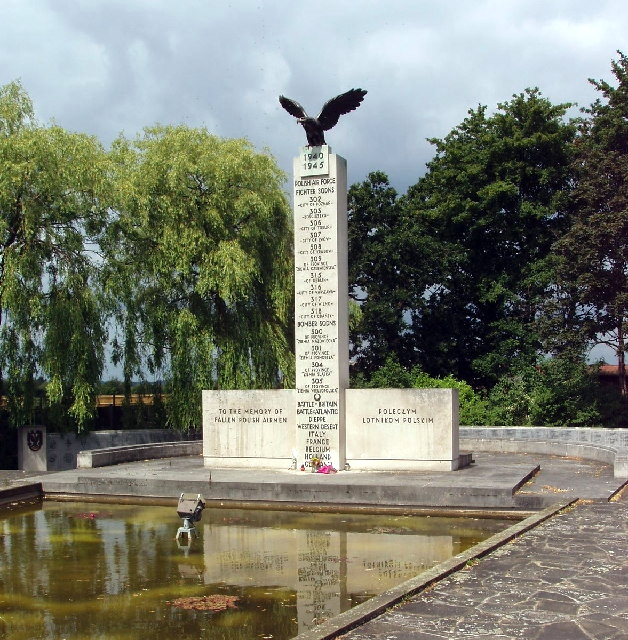
The Polish War Memorial near RAF Northolt

Thirty Allied airmen including servicemen from Belgium, Canada, Czechoslovakia, New Zealand, Poland and the United Kingdom were killed flying from RAF Northolt during the Battle of Britain, of whom ten were Polish. The Polish War Memorial dedicated to all Polish airmen who lost their lives during the Second World War, stands near the southeastern corner of the airfield. Its name is also commemorated at the adjacent eponymous junction on Western Avenue.

Squadrons based at RAF Northolt during the battle shot down a total of 148 Luftwaffe aircraft and damaged 52. A further 25 were claimed by pilots and recorded as "probables". Group Captain Vincent became one of the few RAF airmen to shoot down an enemy aircraft in both World Wars. He was a long-serving RAF man who had claimed an aerial victory over the Western Front in the First World War. By the time of the Battle of Britain he was too old for operational flying. Nevertheless, he took to the skies during one raid and brought down a German aircraft.

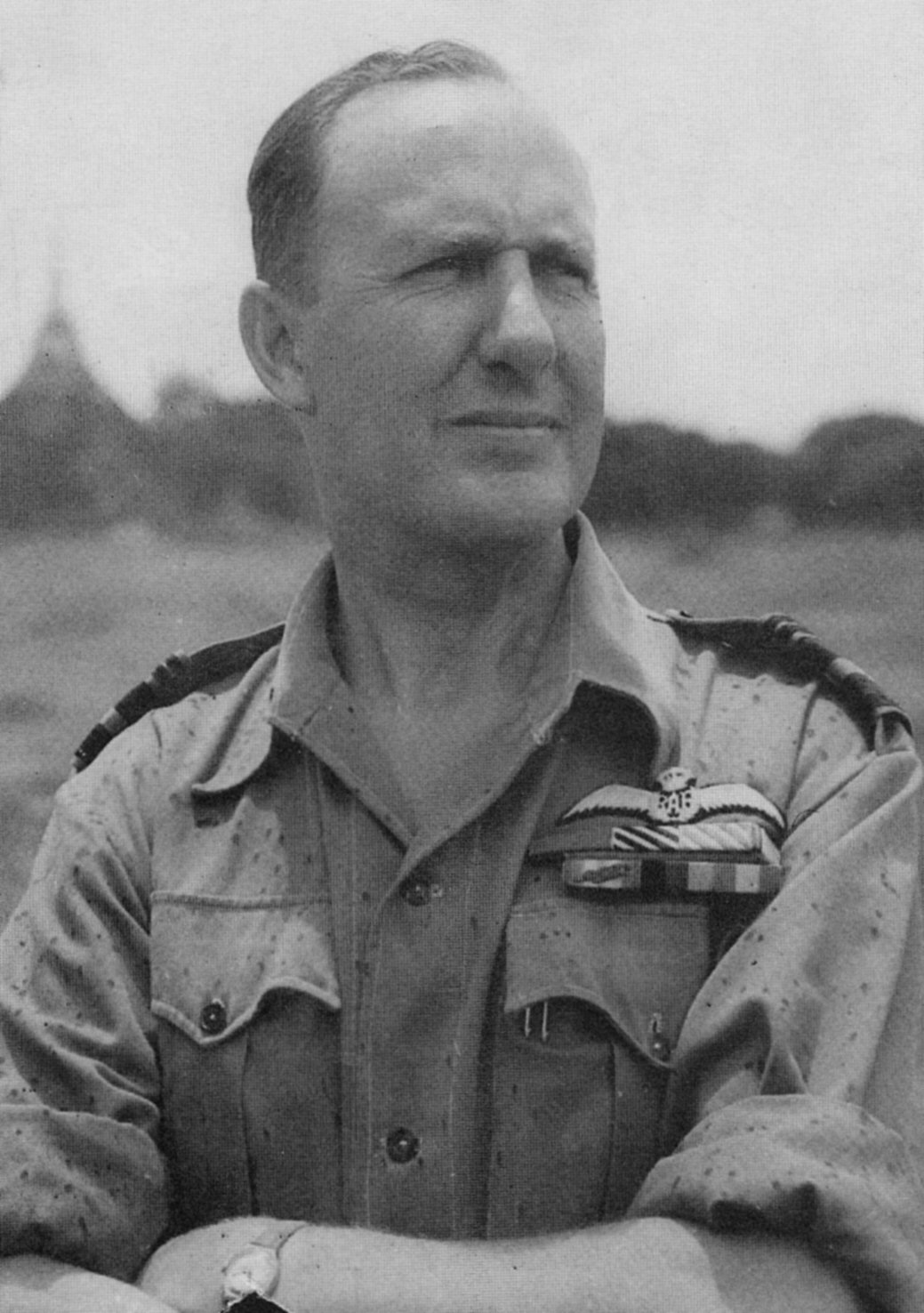
Group Captain Stanley Vincent brought down a German aircraft while serving as station commander in 1940

After the Battle of Britain, the station remained a base for daytime fighter operations, with No. 302 Polish Fighter Squadron, No. 229 Squadron and No. 615 Squadron all arriving before 3 November 1940. No. 308 Polish Fighter Squadron and No. 306 Polish Fighter Squadron later joined No. 303 during 1941 to form the No. 1 Polish Fighter Wing. Polish Fighter Squadrons based at Northolt in 1942 took part in Operation Jubilee (the raid on Dieppe) on 19 August alongside Nos. 302 and 308 from nearby RAF Heston. Reconnaissance squadrons No. 16 Squadron and No. 140 Squadron operating Supermarine Spitfires and de Havilland Mosquitos moved to Northolt in 1944. No. 69 Squadron with their Vickers Wellingtons modified for photographic reconnaissance arrived later. All three reconnaissance squadrons were combined to form No. 34 (PR) Wing.

In 1943, the station became the first to fly sorties using Supermarine Spitfires (Mk IXs) in German airspace in support of bomber operations. On 25 March, RAF Ferry Command became RAF Transport Command and thereafter used Northolt as a London base for the transfer of new aircraft from factories to airfields. Runway 26/08 was extended in February that year to accommodate the larger transport aircraft required by the Command. Northolt continued as a Sector Fighter Station until February 1944. As a result of this and the new larger runway, the smaller 02/20 runway closed in April 1944.

RAF Northolt became home to Prime Minister Winston Churchill's personal aircraft, a modified Douglas C-54 Skymaster, in June 1944. The aircraft was used to fly him to meetings with other Allied leaders. Between 20 and 21 July 1944, a converted Consolidated B-24 Liberator bomber named "Marco Polo" made the first non-stop intercontinental flight, flying from London to Washington, DC, then returning to Northolt from La Guardia Airport within 18 hours. In November of the same year, an Avro York flew non-stop from Northolt to Cairo in 10 hours and 25 minutes. A new runway, 31/13, was surveyed the following month and built in March 1946.

=== Post-war civil and military use ===
Starting in 1946 the airfield was used by civil aviation during the construction of nearby Heathrow Airport. During this period, Northolt became a major base for British European Airways (BEA), which used the nearby Bourne School as its headquarters. Other airlines including Aer Lingus, Alitalia, Scandinavian Airlines System and Swissair used the airfield for scheduled services across Europe.

In December 1946, after taking off during a heavy snowstorm, a Douglas Dakota 3 operated by Railway Air Services, flying from Northolt to Glasgow, crashed onto the roof of a house in South Ruislip. All the crew and passengers escaped unharmed by climbing through the loft of the house and leaving via the front door. No residents were injured, even though the owner of the house next door was standing at her front gate when the aircraft came down. The owners of the house had not moved in at the time of the crash as they were due to be married a few days later. The house was later named "Dakota Rest", and still stands today.

In June 1951, BEA introduced helicopter services to Hay Mills Rotor Station in Birmingham and to London Heathrow, operated by a pair of Westland-Sikorsky S51s.

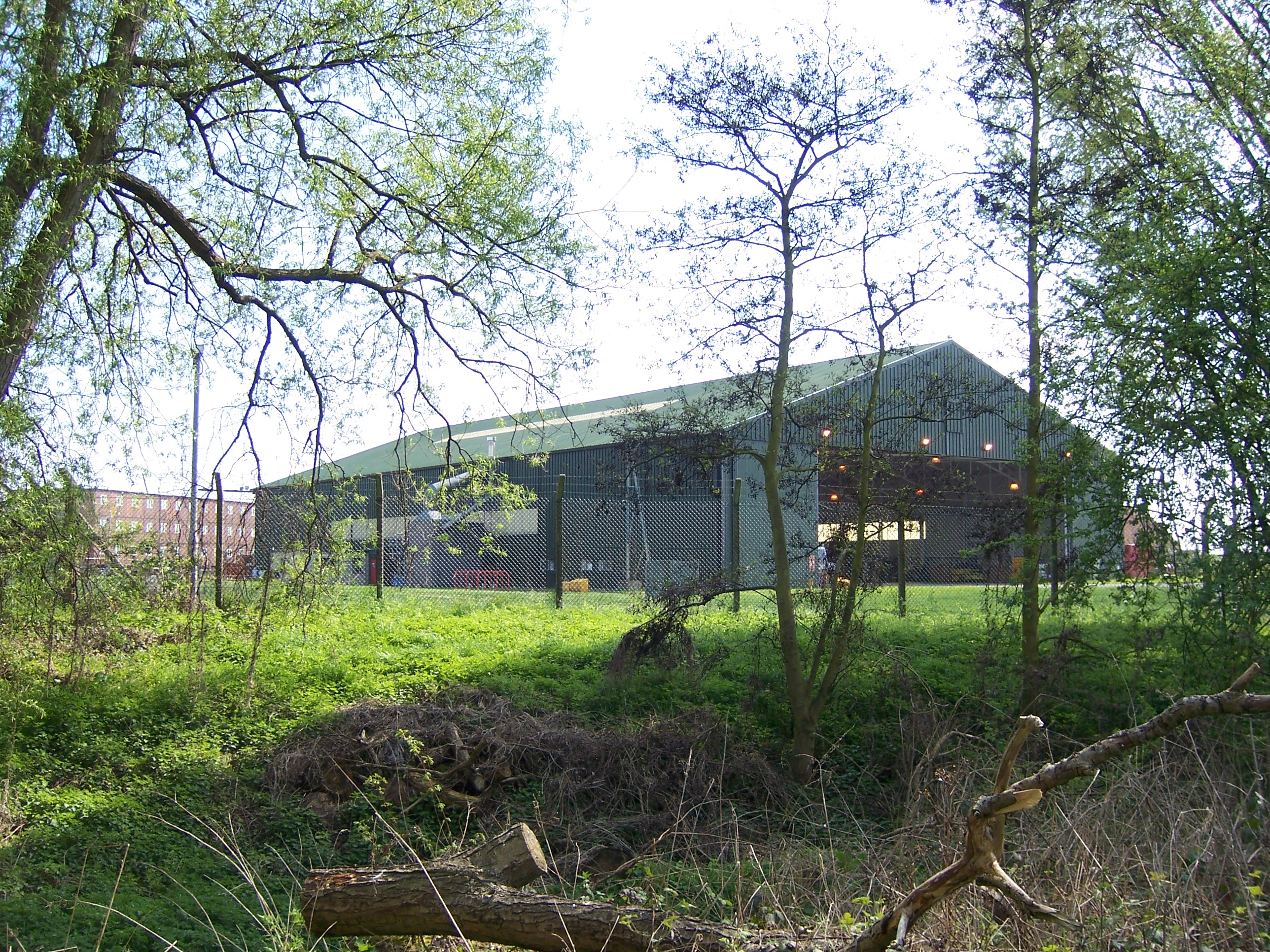
311 hangar at RAF Northolt was used for the opening sequence in the 1983 Bond film Octopussy.

During 1952 a total of 50,000 air movements were recorded, making the airfield the busiest in Europe. By then the only scheduled airlines were BEA and Aer Lingus. The RAF maintained a presence throughout its use by civil airlines, making it the longest continuously used airfield in the history of the Royal Air Force. En route from Northolt to Dublin, on 10 January 1952, a civil Douglas C-47 Skytrain operated by Aer Lingus and named "St. Kevin" flew into an area of extreme turbulence caused by a mountain wave generated by Snowdon. As a result, the plane crashed into a peat bog near Llyn Gwynant in Snowdonia, killing all 20 passengers and three crew in the company's first fatal accident.

Civil flights ceased when the central area at Heathrow opened in 1954 with Northolt reverting to sole military use in May that year. Northolt's operations became constrained by its proximity to the new much larger civil airport at Heathrow. No. 1 Aeronautical Information Documents Unit (AIDU) moved to the station in 1956 from the neighbouring RAF West Ruislip station. The unit had been established in 1953 to provide information on airfields, communications and navigational aids for the benefit of aircraft safety. AIDU was originally under the command of RAF Transport Command but this was moved to Home Command in March 1957.

On 1 June 1960, an Avro Anson aircraft suffered engine failure soon after take-off from Northolt and crash-landed on top of the nearby Express Dairies plant in South Ruislip. There were no fatalities. Later that year, on 25 October, a Boeing 707 from Pan Am heading for Heathrow mistakenly landed at Northolt with forty-one passengers on board. A Lufthansa Boeing 707 also attempted to land at the station on 28 April 1964 but was dissuaded by a red signal flare fired by personnel from Air Traffic Control. In the days before navigational aids such as instrument landing systems (ILS) and the global positioning system (GPS) were available, the letters NO (for Northolt) and LH (for Heathrow) were painted on two gasometers on the approach to each airfield, one at Southall for the approach to Heathrow's diagonal runway (coded 23L) and one at South Harrow for the approach to Northolt's runway (then coded 26), in an effort to prevent a recurrence of such errors. By the 1980s movements of privately owned aircraft, mainly corporate jets, outnumbered military aircraft. Civil flights were limited to 28 per day, with a maximum of 7,000 a year. This limit remained in force in 2008.

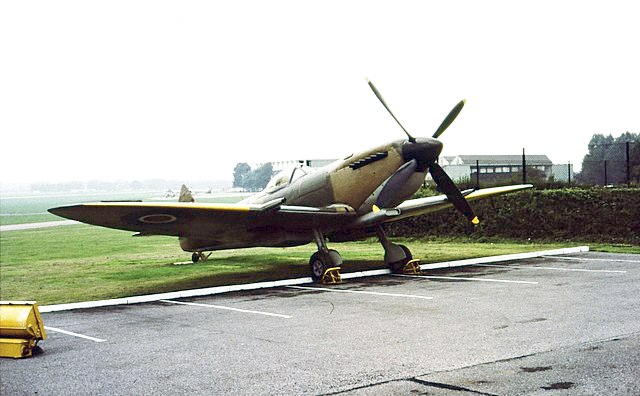
Spitfire gate guardian pictured in 1973, later restored and moved to Florida

Northolt received its first gate guardian, a Spitfire F.Mk 22, in September 1963. Purchased from the RAF in 1969 for use in the film Battle of Britain, it was replaced by a Spitfire Mk XVI on 2 June 1970. This aircraft remained at the station until its removal on 8 September 1989 for restoration to full flying condition. The Kermit Weeks' Fantasy of Flight Museum in Polk City, Florida, purchased the aircraft whereupon the station received a fibreglass replica of a Spitfire Mk IX as a replacement.

Servicing of No. 32 Squadron passed from the RAF to the private company Fields Aviation Services in April 1985, then to Lovaux Aircraft Servicing in 1990. In 1991, the Station Flight was established, taking delivery of two Britten-Norman Islanders in December which entered service in January 1992. No. 32 Squadron celebrated its Diamond Jubilee in 1991, at a time when personnel became involved in operations during the Gulf War. No. 38 Group RAF assumed control of RAF Northolt on 2 November 1992 following a wider restructuring of the RAF. On 16 December 1994, the new southside Operations Building opened, replacing the old Northolt Airport Terminal building. With the reorganisation of RAF Strike Command on 1 April 2000, No. 38 Group was disbanded and Northolt came under the control of No. 2 Group RAF.

=== Modern use ===
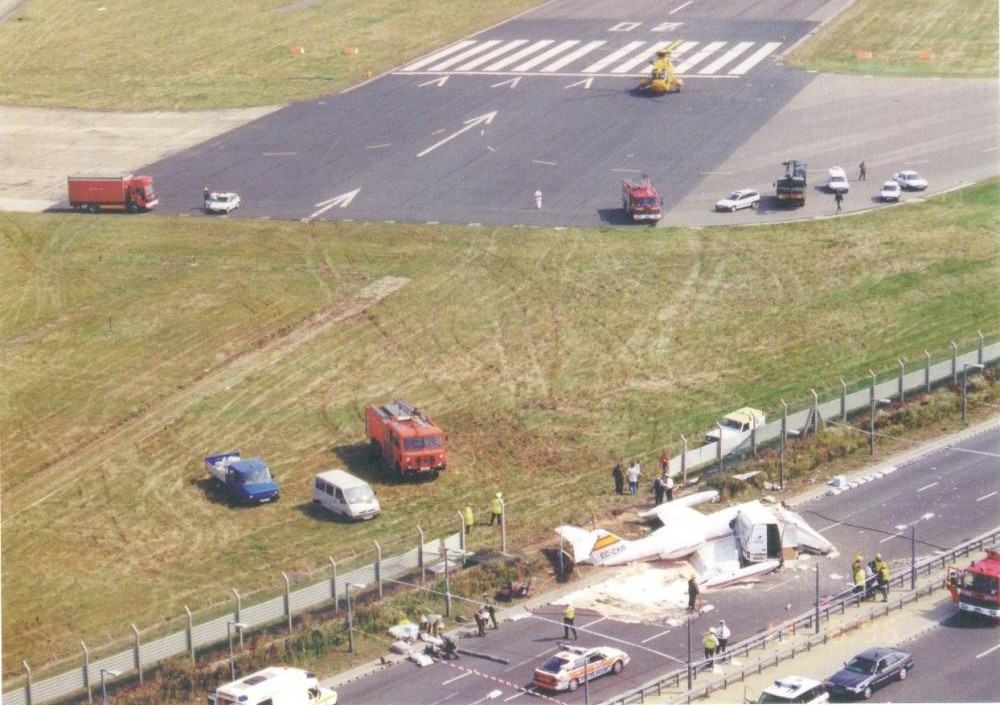
MAC Aviation Learjet 25B EC-CKR after landing accident

In August 1996, a Spanish Learjet operated by Mar Aviation overshot runway 25 and collided with a van heading eastward on the A40 Western Avenue; the aircraft was carrying an Irish actress, Lisa Hogan bound for Pinewood Studios in Buckinghamshire. The two pilots, the actress and van driver all suffered minor injuries. The ensuing investigation by the Civil Aviation Authority's Air Accidents Investigation Branch found that both the crew's lack of understanding English and military air traffic control procedures had contributed significantly to the crash. Subsequently, after some thirty years of protracted consideration, an ILS was eventually fitted to Northolt's redefined Runway 25. In addition, aggregate-filled safety pits were installed at each end of the runway by 21 January 1998 to protect road users in the event of another business jet or military transport failing to stop or ascend before the end of the runway. The House of Commons Transport Select Committee considered the conversion of RAF Northolt to a possible offshoot of Heathrow Airport in the 1990s. While the existing runways would cause aircraft to cross the flight paths of those using Heathrow, new parallel runways were suggested. These suggestions were opposed by then MP for Ruislip-Northwood, John Wilkinson, and eventually progressed no further.

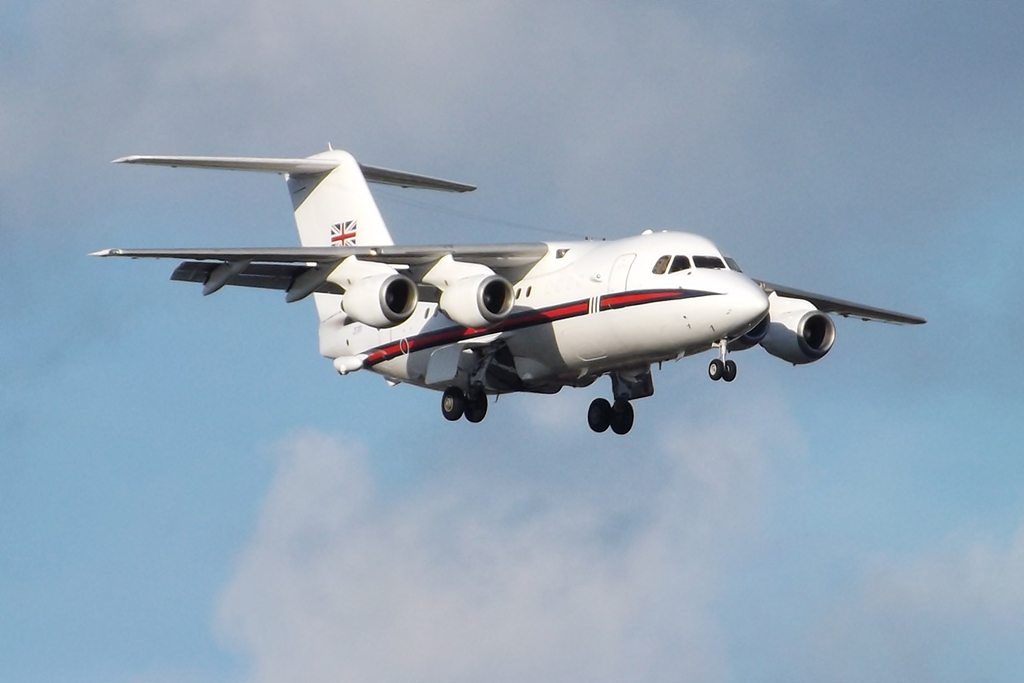
BAe 146 of 32 (The Royal) Squadron in 2013

Much media attention focused on the airfield when the body of Diana, Princess of Wales, arrived there from Villacoublay airfield, in Paris, France, after her death in a car crash in the city on 31 August 1997. The Queen's Colour Squadron, then based at neighbouring RAF Uxbridge, acted as the bearer party, while the flight was met by the prime minister Tony Blair, the lord chamberlain, Lord Lieutenant of Greater London, secretary of state for defence, the RAF Northolt station commander and the RAF chaplain-in-chief.

Attention was high again in 2001 when Ronnie Biggs, the seriously ill, fugitive Great Train Robber, was flown from Brazil to the airfield to be arrested by waiting police officers. Biggs had escaped from custody in 1965; upon his return he was taken to Belmarsh Prison to complete the remainder of his sentence.

Since 1 June 1998, station commanders have served as aides-de-camp to the Queen. The station received the Freedom of Entry to the London Borough of Hillingdon on 11 May 2000. This allowed military personnel to march through the borough in full uniform, an honour granted by the council in light of 2000 being the 60th anniversary of the Battle of Britain and the 85th anniversary of the opening of RAF Northolt. The neighbouring RAF Uxbridge station had received the same honour in 1960.

The remains of a Hawker Hurricane flown by Flying Officer Ludwik Witold Paszkiewicz, the first pilot in No. 303 Squadron to shoot down an enemy aircraft, were donated to the station in June 2008. During the Battle of Britain, Paszkiewicz became a flying ace and received the Distinguished Flying Cross after shooting down six aircraft. He was killed in action over Borough Green in Kent on 27 September 1940. No. 303 Squadron recorded its 100th kill less than a month after commencing operations. Polish pilot Squadron Leader Franciszek Kornicki, who saw wartime service at RAF Northolt, was reunited with the Supermarine Spitfire he had flown at a special ceremony in September 2010.

An additional memorial to British, Polish, Australian and New Zealand aircrew killed during the Battle of Britain was unveiled in September 2010. In October that year, the hangar which had housed Churchill's personal aircraft, the former Squadron Watch office, and the Operations Block were given Grade II listed building status. The Operations Block was a prototype of the "Dowding system", which facilitated the chain of command's issuance of orders for the interception of enemy aircraft and a scheme used for the first time during the Battle of Britain. Prior to the listing, the block was renamed the Sir Keith Park Building on 20 September in honour of the former No. 11 Group RAF commander who had also served as station commander at Northolt between 1931 and 1932. RAF Northolt is the only airfield used in the Battle of Britain still operated by the RAF.

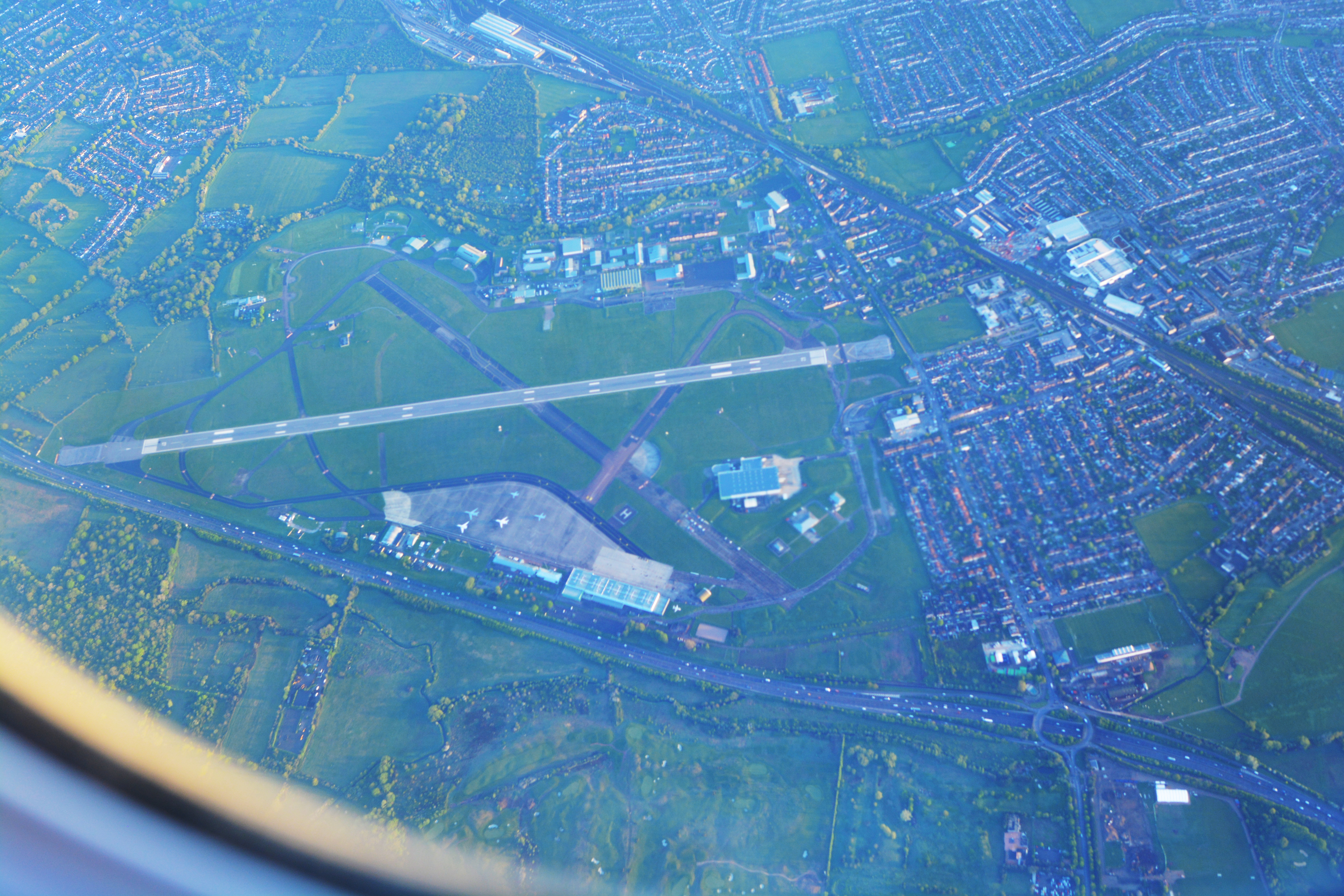
Aerial view, 2024

In January 2012 it was reported that the future of the station was under review by the Ministry of Defence as part of efforts to reduce defence spending. A proposed use has been as a satellite of Heathrow Airport, although a Ministry of Defence spokesman described that as unlikely.

Four Eurofighter Typhoon aircraft arrived at the station from RAF Coningsby on 2 May 2012 to take part in a security exercise as part of preparations for the 2012 Summer Olympics. During the Games, the aircraft were deployed to the station to provide air superiority protection for London, in conjunction with other security measures by the British Armed Forces. The presence of the aircraft during the Olympics became the first-time fighter aircraft had been stationed at RAF Northolt since the Second World War. The Typhoons departed Northolt on 16 August following the conclusion of the Olympics.

The overnight base of the London Air Ambulance moved to RAF Northolt from Denham Aerodrome in February 2013. The flying time from the station to its daytime base at the Royal London Hospital in Whitechapel is three minutes shorter than from Denham, which also provides savings for the Air Ambulance charity.

In April 2013 the Ministry of Defence announced a proposal to increase the number of private flights from 7,000 to 12,000 per year as part of plans to increase the income generated by the airfield. The number of flights would be limited to 40 per day, and the increase would be phased in over three years to 2016.

On 13 September 2022, Queen Elizabeth II's coffin arrived at Northolt from Edinburgh Airport, after which it was taken by road to Buckingham Palace. The flight was met by a party including the Prime Minister Liz Truss and the Secretary of State for Defence Ben Wallace. An RAF bearer party formed by The Queen's Colour Squadron transferred the coffin from the aircraft to the hearse.

=== Project MoDEL redevelopment ===
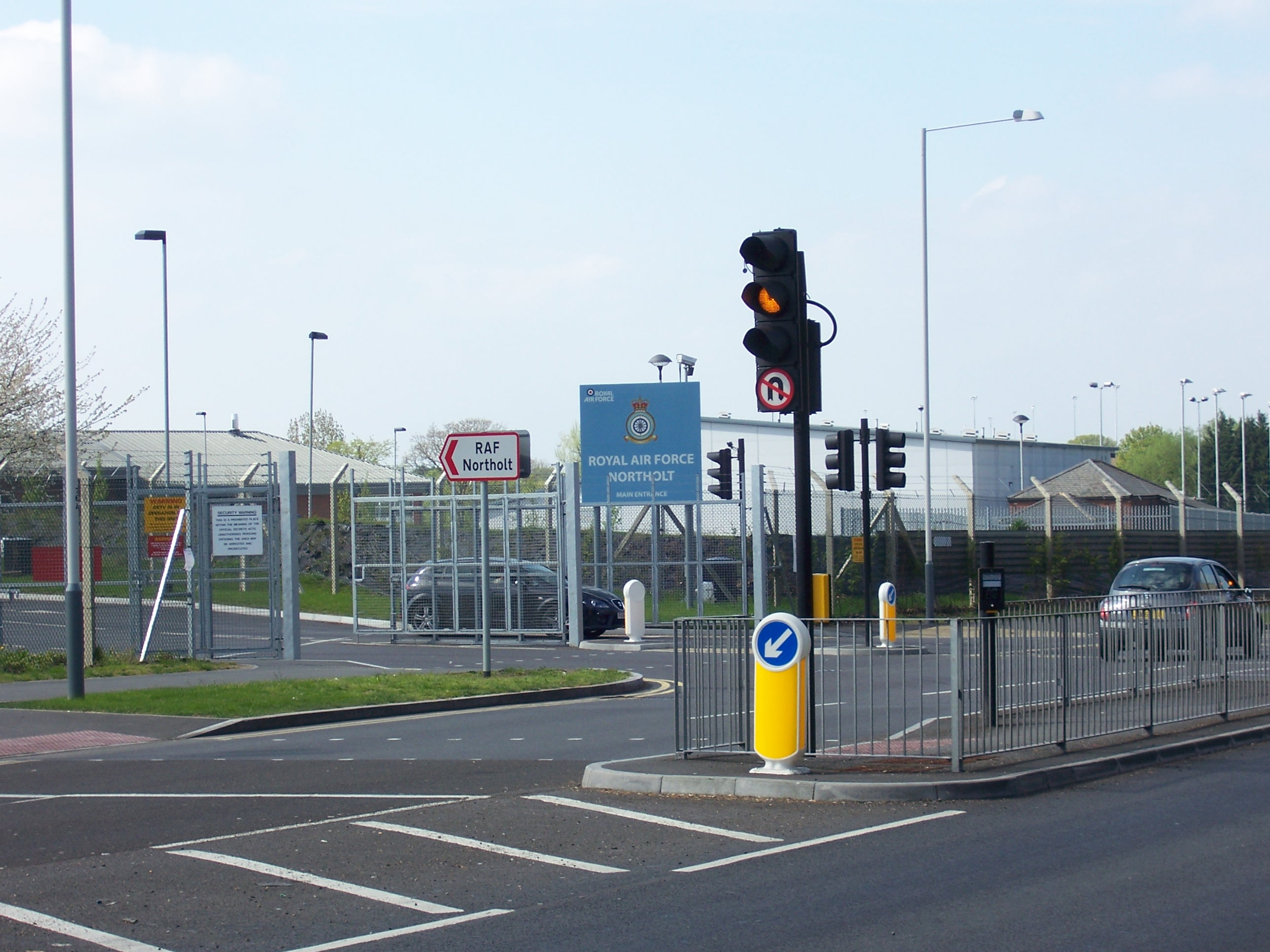
The redeveloped main entrance in 2011

The Ministry of Defence launched Project MoDEL (Ministry of Defence Estates London) in 2006 to consolidate many of its London-based operations at RAF Northolt. Under the project, RAF Bentley Priory, RAF Uxbridge, RAF West Ruislip, RAF Eastcote and the Inglis Barracks in Mill Hill were all closed between 2006 and 2010 with any remaining units transferring to Northolt. The Air Historical Branch, originally established in 1919 to provide a record of air activity during the First World War, was also relocated to RAF Northolt from RAF Bentley Priory in 2008 as part of this project. As a result, the station has been extensively redeveloped with new facilities to support these operations.

The statue, Letter from Home, of a First World War soldier reading a letter was moved from outside Inglis Barracks in Mill Hill to RAF Northolt in June 2007. It is a replica of the statue at Paddington Station and was first unveiled in 1982. Following the relocation of the British Forces Post Office and Defence Courier Service from Mill Hill, a new headquarters and main sorting facility were built for their use which opened in November 2007. New hangar facilities for the use of No. 32 Squadron were also constructed, along with new personnel accommodation.

The original 1920s Officers' Mess was refurbished as part of the work, which also saw the relocation of the replica Supermarine Spitfire gate guardian to the passenger terminal, and the unveiling of a new replica Hawker Hurricane gate guardian near the eastern station entrance in September 2010, commemorating the aircrew based at Northolt who had fought in the Battle of Britain.

Upon the closure of RAF Uxbridge, control of the Battle of Britain Bunker passed to RAF Northolt to allow continued public visits. In December 2010 it was agreed that the South Hillingdon branch of the St. John Ambulance service would move from its existing base in RAF Uxbridge to new premises at Northolt.

The station's new police dog section, featuring kennels and a quarantine building, opened in February 2012, marking the completion of building work.

=== Runway resurfacing ===
In October 2018, a £23 million contract to resurface Northolt's runway was awarded to Lagan Aviation & Infrastructure as the main contractor, and Mott MacDonald in a support role.

The runway closed and work began on 15 April 2019. No. 32 (The Royal) Squadron fixed wing flight relocated to RAF Benson in Oxfordshire, whilst civilian aircraft used alternative civilian airports. Helicopters continued to operate from Northolt during the construction work. The first landing on the resurfaced runway was on 9 October 2019. The runway underwent testing as part of the recommissioning process before officially reopening on 1 November 2019 with commercial operations scheduled to resume on 11 November 2019.

== Based units ==
The following flying and notable non-flying units based at RAF Northolt:

=== Royal Air Force ===
No. 1 Group (Air Combat)

- No. 600 (City of London) Squadron (Royal Auxiliary Air Force)

No. 2 Group (Air Combat Support)

- Air Mobility Force
  - No. 32 (The Royal) Squadron – Envoy IV CC1
- Combat and Readiness Force
  - No. 2 Force Protection Wing
    - No. 63 Squadron (King's Colour Squadron) RAF Regiment
- RAF Music Services
  - Headquarters RAF Music Services
  - Central Band of the RAF
  - Band of the Royal Air Force Regiment

Other

- No. 601 (County of London) Squadron (Royal Auxiliary Air Force)
- RAF Centre for Air Power Studies
  - Air Historical Branch

=== British Army ===
Royal Logistic Corps

- 29 Explosive Ordnance Disposal and Search Group
  - 11 Explosive Ordnance Disposal and Search Regiment
    - 621 Explosive Ordnance Disposal Squadron

=== Strategic Command ===
Defence Intelligence

- Director of Cyber Intelligence and Information Integration
  - Joint Forces Intelligence Group (JFIG)
    - No. 1 Aeronautical Information Documents Unit (AIDU)

=== Defence Equipment and Support ===
- British Forces Post Office

=== Ministry of Defence ===
- Service Prosecution Authority

== Role and operations ==
The station is organised into two wings, with a number of lodger units. Within the Operations Wing, the station houses No. 32 (The Royal) Squadron RAF, and the Comms Fleet Force Headquarters. No. 32 Squadron currently flies two Dassault Falcon 900LX (known as the Envoy IV CC1 in RAF service).

The Support Wing of the station incorporates the Personnel Management Squadron, the Estates Management Squadron, the Station Management Squadron, the Force Development Squadron, Media and Communications, the Finance Department and Safety, Health and Environmental Protection. Its Operations Squadron, the Air Movements Squadron and the Airfield Support Squadron make up the station's Operations Wing.

Lodger Units at Northolt include No. 600 Squadron Royal Auxiliary Air Force, 621 EOD Squadron Royal Logistic Corps (part of 11 Explosive Ordnance Disposal and Search Regiment RLC), No. 1 AIDU (Aeronautical Information Documents Unit), the Central Band of the Royal Air Force, the Service Prosecuting Authority, Naval Aeronautical Information Centre, the British Forces Post Office (BFPO), the Air Historical Branch and the Polish Records Office.

2Excel Aviation operated two Piper PA-31 Navajos under a civilian contract for the RAF following the sale in 2017 of RAF Northolt's Station Flight's two Britten-Norman Islander CC.2s. The Islanders had operated in electronic intelligence gathering, described by the RAF as performing "photographic mapping and light communications roles".

== Squadrons and aircraft ==
Sources: Battle of Britain Airfields (1st Edition) and A History of Royal Air Force Northolt

| Unit | Dates | Aircraft | Variant | Notes |
|---|---|---|---|---|
| No. 1 Squadron RAF | August–September 1940 | Hawker Hurricane | I | |
| No. 1 Squadron RCAF | August–October 1940 | Hawker Hurricane | I | Renumbered No. 401 Squadron RCAF in 1941 |
| No. 4 Squadron RAF | February–September 1919 | Royal Aircraft Factory RE 8 | | Returned from operations in France as a cadre |
| No. 12 Squadron RAF | April 1923 – March 1924 | De Havilland DH.9A | | Formed at Northolt then moved to RAF Andover |
| No. 16 Squadron RAF | April–September 1944 | Supermarine Spitfire | XI and XI | Moved out to Normandy, France |
| No. 18 Squadron RFC | May–August 1915 | Various | | Formed at Northolt then moved to Mousehold |
| No. 23 Squadron RAF | December 1936 – May 1938 | Hawker Demon | | |
| No. 24 Squadron RAF | January 1927 – February 1933 | Variety of types | | Operated eight different types of aircraft for communications and liaison duties |
| No. 25 Squadron RAF | September 1938 – October 1938 | Gloster Gladiator | I | |
| No. 32 Squadron RAF | February 1969 – | Percival Pembroke; Bristol Sycamore; Beagle Basset; Hawker Siddeley Andover; Westland Whirlwind; British Aerospace 125; Westland Gazelle; BAe 146; AgustaWestland AW109; Dassault Falcon 900LX | | Communications and liaison duties |
| No. 41 Squadron RAF | April 1923 – October 1935 | Sopwith Snipe; Armstrong Whitworth Siskin; Bristol Bulldog; Hawker Demon | 7F.1; III & IIIA; 105A Mk. IIa; I | Posted to the Aden Protectorate during the Abyssinian crisis of 1935–36. |
| No. 43 Squadron RAF | May–September 1940 | Hawker Hurricane | I | Not based but operated detachments from RAF Tangmere |
| No. 65 Squadron RAF | October 1939 – March 1940 | Supermarine Spitfire | I | |
| No. 69 Squadron RAF | May–September 1944 | Vickers Wellington | XIII | Moved out to Normandy, France |
| No. 111 Squadron RAF | July 1934 – October 1939 | Bristol Bulldog; Gloster Gauntlet; Hawker Hurricane | | |
| No. 124 Squadron RAF | July–September 1943 | Supermarine Spitfire | VII | |
| No. 140 Squadron RAF | April–September 1944 | De Havilland Mosquito | IX and XVI | Moved out to Normandy, France |
| No. 207 Squadron RAF | February 1969 – June 1984 | Beagle Basset; Hunting Pembroke; De Havilland Devon | | Communication and liaison squadron |
| No. 213 Squadron RAF | March 1937 – July 1937 | Gloster Gauntlet | II | |
| No. 229 Squadron RAF | September–December 1940 | Hawker Hurricane | I | |
| No. 253 Squadron RAF | February–May 1940 | Hawker Hurricane | I | |
| No. 257 Squadron RAF | July–August 1940 | Hawker Hurricane | I | |
| No. 264 Squadron RAF | August–October 1940 | Hawker Hurricane | I | |
| No. 302 Polish Fighter Squadron | October–November 1940; December 1943 – March 1944 | Hawker Hurricane | I | Polish-manned unit |
| No. 303 Polish Fighter Squadron | January–July 1941 | Supermarine Spitfire | I, IIA and IIB | Polish-manned unit |
| No. 306 Polish Fighter Squadron | April–October 1941 | Hawker Hurricane; Supermarine Spitfire | | |
| No. 306 Polish Fighter Squadron | June 1942 – March 1943 | Supermarine Spitfire | VB then IX | Polish-manned unit |
| No. 308 Polish Fighter Squadron | October–December 1943 | Supermarine Spitfire | IIA | Polish-manned unit |
| No. 315 Polish Fighter Squadron | July 1941 – April 1942 | Supermarine Spitfire | IIA, IIB and VB | Polish-manned unit |
| No. 316 Polish Fighter Squadron | December–April 1942; March–September 1943 | Supermarine Spitfire | VB | Polish-manned unit |
| No. 317 Polish Fighter Squadron | April–June 1942; July–September 1942; September–December 1943 | Supermarine Spitfire | VB then IX | Polish-manned unit |
| No. 515 Squadron RAF | October 1942 | Boulton Paul Defiant | II | Formed then moved to Heston |
| No. 600 Squadron RAF | October 1925 – January 1927 | De Havilland DH.9A | | Formed at Northolt |
| No. 600 Squadron RAF | August–October 1939; May–June 1940 | Bristol Blenheim | I | |
| No. 601 Squadron RAF | October 1925 – January 1927 | De Havilland DH.9A | | Formed at Northolt |
| No. 601 Squadron RAF | December 1940 – May 1941 | Hawker Hurricane | I, II | |
| No. 604 Squadron RAF | January–May 1940 | Bristol Blenheim | I | |
| No. 604 Squadron RAF | June–July 1940 | Gloster Gladiator | I | |
| No. 609 Squadron RAF | May–July 1940 | Supermarine Spitfire | I | |
| No. 615 Squadron RAF | October–December 1940 | Hawker Hurricane | I | |

== In popular culture ==
As it is near several film studios including those at Pinewood, the airfield has been used to represent outside locations in a number of feature films. Scenes of the James Bond films Goldfinger, Thunderball and Octopussy were all filmed at Northolt, and station personnel served as extras in the Octopussy hangar fly-through stunt scene. The mini-series The Winds of War and The Bill and the BBC shows Waking the Dead, Doctor Who and Red Dwarf have all used Northolt to represent various fictional airfields. In early 2010 the station was used for action scenes in the final episode of the conclusion of the BBC series of Ashes to Ashes.

== See also ==
- Kennedy Giant
- List of Battle of Britain airfields
- List of Royal Air Force stations
