= Royal Air Force Music Services =

UK military band

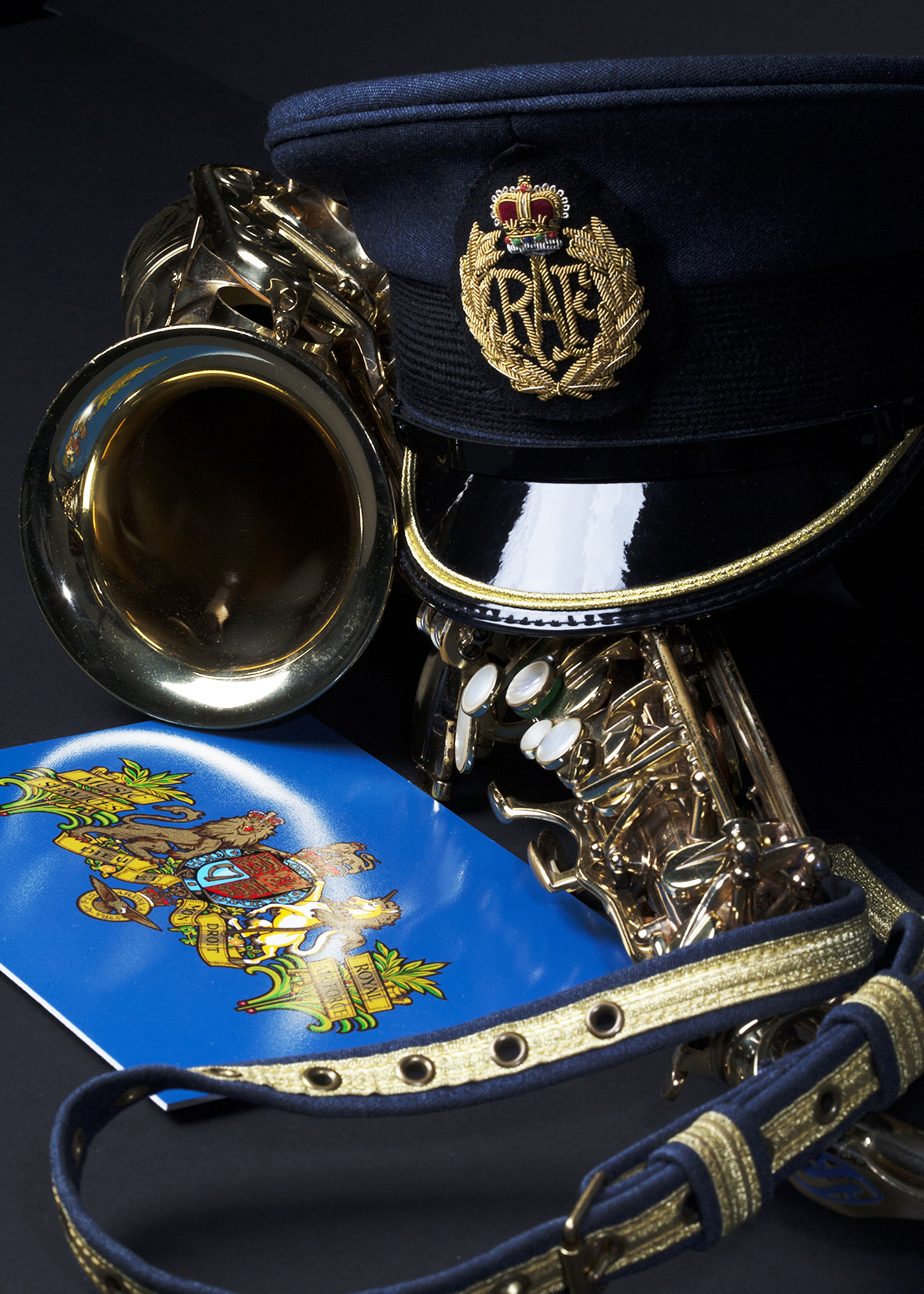
The cap, belt and saxophone of a member of the RAF Central Band.

Royal Air Force Music Services is the organization which provides military musical support to the Royal Air Force. Based at RAF Northolt (previously at RAF Uxbridge) and RAF Cranwell, it forms the central administration of one hundred and seventy musicians divided between The Band of the Royal Air Force College, The Band of the Royal Air Force Regiment, Central Band of the Royal Air Force, the Royal Air Force Salon Orchestra and Headquarters Music Services. These main military bands contain within their ranks the Royal Air Force Squadronaires, Royal Air Force Swing Wing and Royal Air Force Shades of Blue.

== History ==
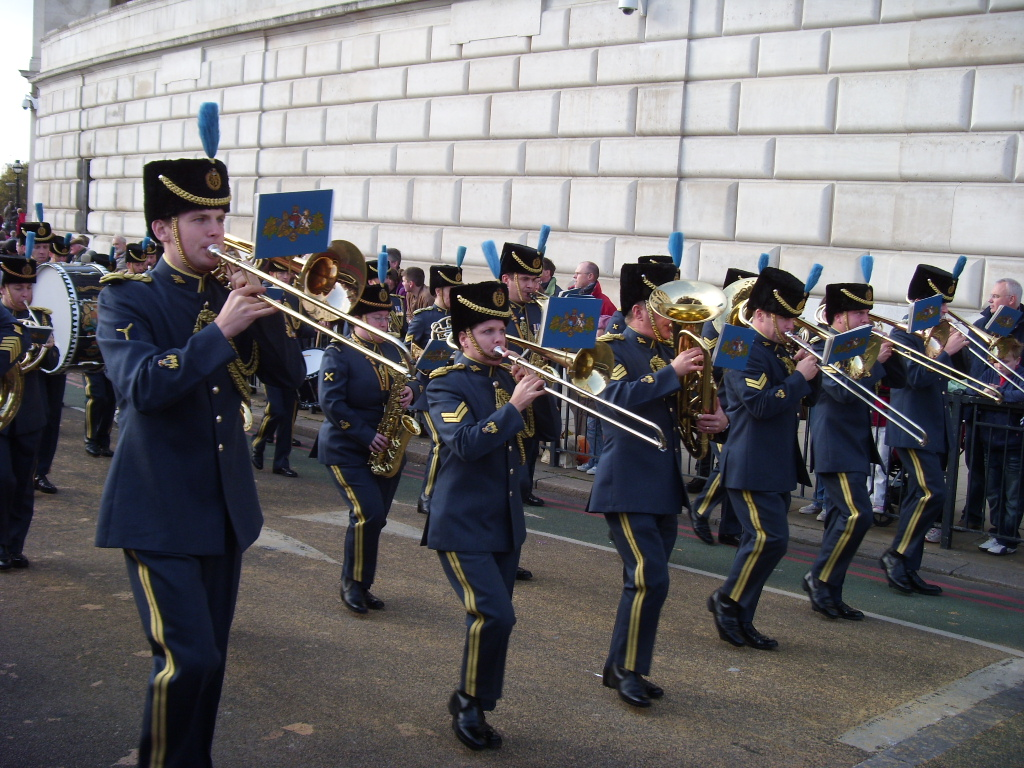
Lord Mayor's Show, London 2007. (Use of the full-dress busby was discontinued in 2012.)

Royal Air Force Music Services has its origins in the RAF School of Music which was established by Walford Davies in 1918.

== Current organization ==
RAF Music Services consists of the Band of the Royal Air Force College, Central Band of the Royal Air Force, Band of the Royal Air Force Regiment, Headquarters Music Services (HQMS), Royal Air Force Salon Orchestra, and the Band of the Royal Auxiliary Air Force. Besides supporting the Royal Air Force, Royal Air Force Music Services' musicians also undertake operational roles both as individuals and as a unit. The RAF Music Services' current Principal Director of Music is Wing Commander Richard Murray.

== See also ==
- RAF Voluntary Bands
