= Band of the Royal Air Force College =

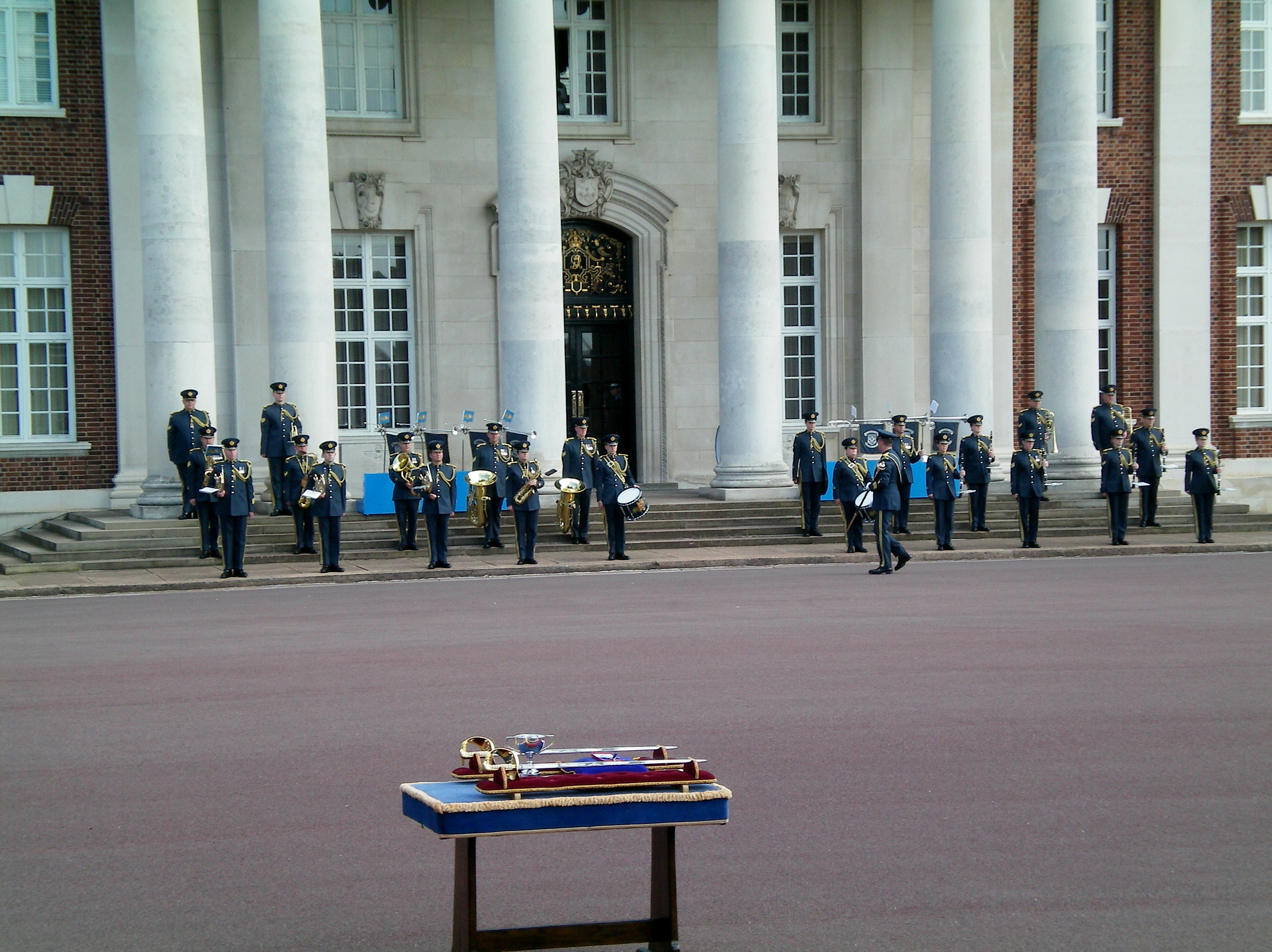
The Band of the RAF College prepares for a graduation parade at College Hall.

The Band of the Royal Air Force College is based at RAF Cranwell and is one of three established bands in the Royal Air Force. It is the music ensemble of the Royal Air Force College Cranwell.

Formed in 1920 and based at RAF Cranwell, the Band of the Royal Air Force College is now one of three established Bands in the RAF. Originally formed to support the Royal Air Force College, the band is now administered by RAF Music Services. In addition to its duties at Cranwell, the Band takes part in major events such as the Changing of the Guard at Buckingham Palace and the Edinburgh Tattoo as well as a busy schedule of services and charity engagements.

Royal Air Force Swing Wing is the big band of The Band of the RAF College.
