= RAF Brampton Wyton Henlow =

Former combined RAF Bases in East Anglia, England

Coordinates: 52.0153°N 0.3031°W

- Active: 2001 – 2 April 2012
- Country: United Kingdom
- Allegiance: British Armed Forces
- Branch: Royal Air Force
- Type: RAF station grouping
- Role: Intelligence, flying training, security and support
- Garrison/HQ: RAF Brampton, RAF Wyton and RAF Henlow

RAF Brampton Wyton Henlow is a former Royal Air Force unit covering three distinct sites in Cambridgeshire and Bedfordshire. The three sites, separately known as RAF Brampton, RAF Wyton and RAF Henlow, housed a number of flying training, intelligence, security and other RAF support organisations. On 2 April 2012 the unit was disbanded with RAF Brampton being renamed Brampton Camp RAF Wyton.

== History ==
In 2001, the three RAF stations were brought together under the one umbrella with one station commander. RAF Stanbridge was brought into the agreement too, but was not formally noted in the tri-base name. At that time, RAF Brampton Wyton Henlow represented the largest RAF base in terms of real estate and personnel.

== Based units (in 2012) ==
=== RAF Brampton (now closed) ===
- Joint Air Reconnaissance Intelligence Centre (Formally closed down mid-2012)
- Defence Security Standards Organisation
- No 73 (Huntingdon) Squadron Air Training Corps

=== RAF Wyton ===
- 57(R) Squadron
- Cambridge University Air Squadron
- London University Air Squadron
- 5 Air Experience Flight
- Defence Equipment and Support
- No 2331 (St Ives) Squadron Air Training Corps

=== RAF Henlow ===
- RAF Centre for Aviation Medicine
- Joint Arms Control Implementation Group
- Tactical Provost Wing (TPW)
- No 1 Specialist Police Wing
- No 8 RAF Force Protection Wing HQ
- No 2482 (Henlow) Squadron Air Training Corps
- No 616 Volunteer Gliding Squadron
