= Central Band of the Royal Air Force =

Background information
- Years active: 1920-present
- Website: www.raf.mod.uk/display-teams/raf-music-services/

The Central Band of the Royal Air Force is an RAF regular band and is part of Royal Air Force Music Services. The motto of the band is Aere Invicti (Latin for "Invincible with the Brass").

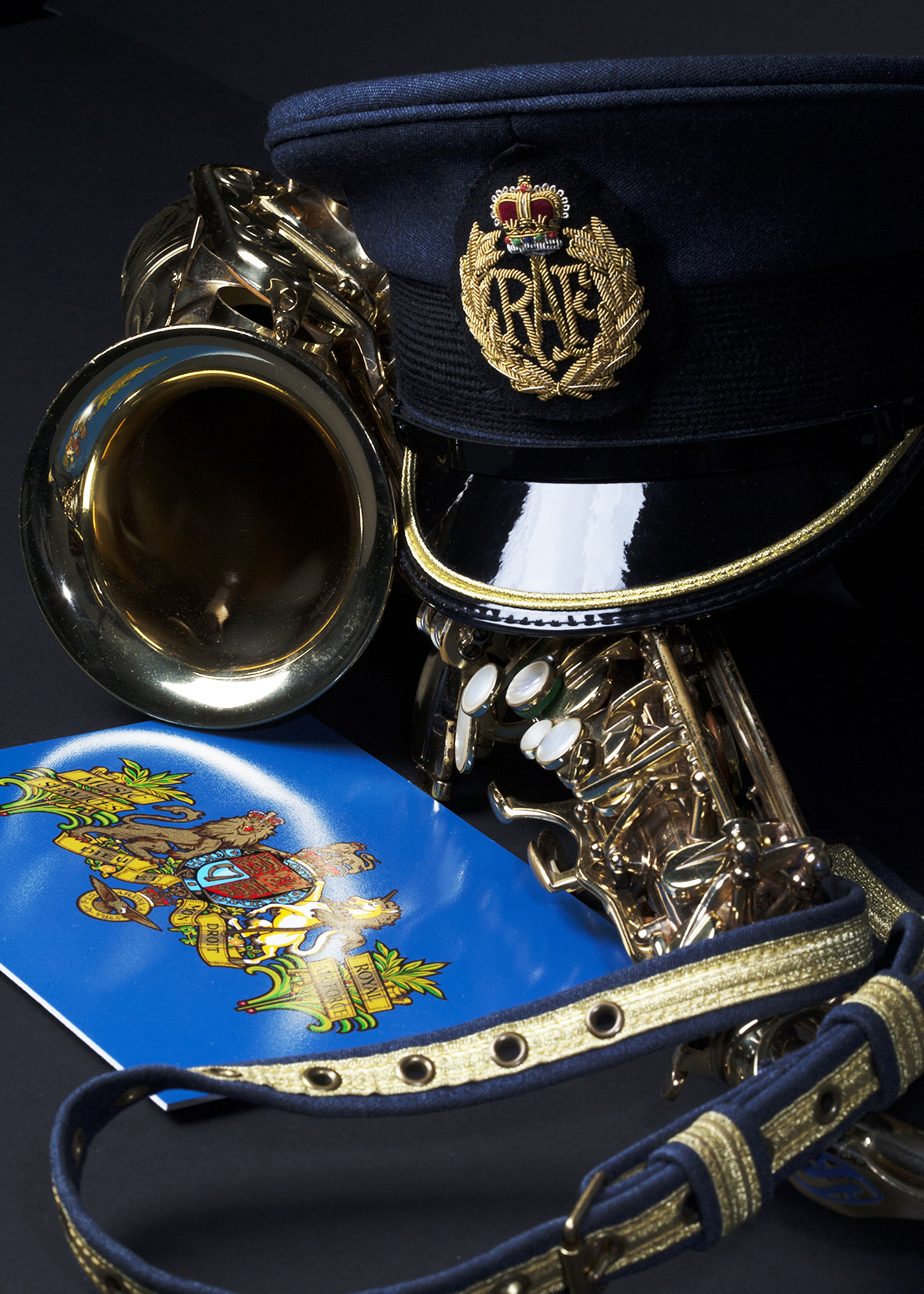
Equipment (saxophone) in December 2015

== History ==
The Central Band of the RAF was formed in 1920, shortly after the RAF had been formed in 1918. Their version of the theme from the Dam Busters reached No. 18 in October 1955, spending one week in the UK Top 20.

The band has given performances on BBC Radio 2's Friday Night is Music Night in October 2010 and, to mark the 100th anniversary of the formation of the RAF, in April 2018.

It is currently (2025) based at RAF Northolt.

== Personnel ==
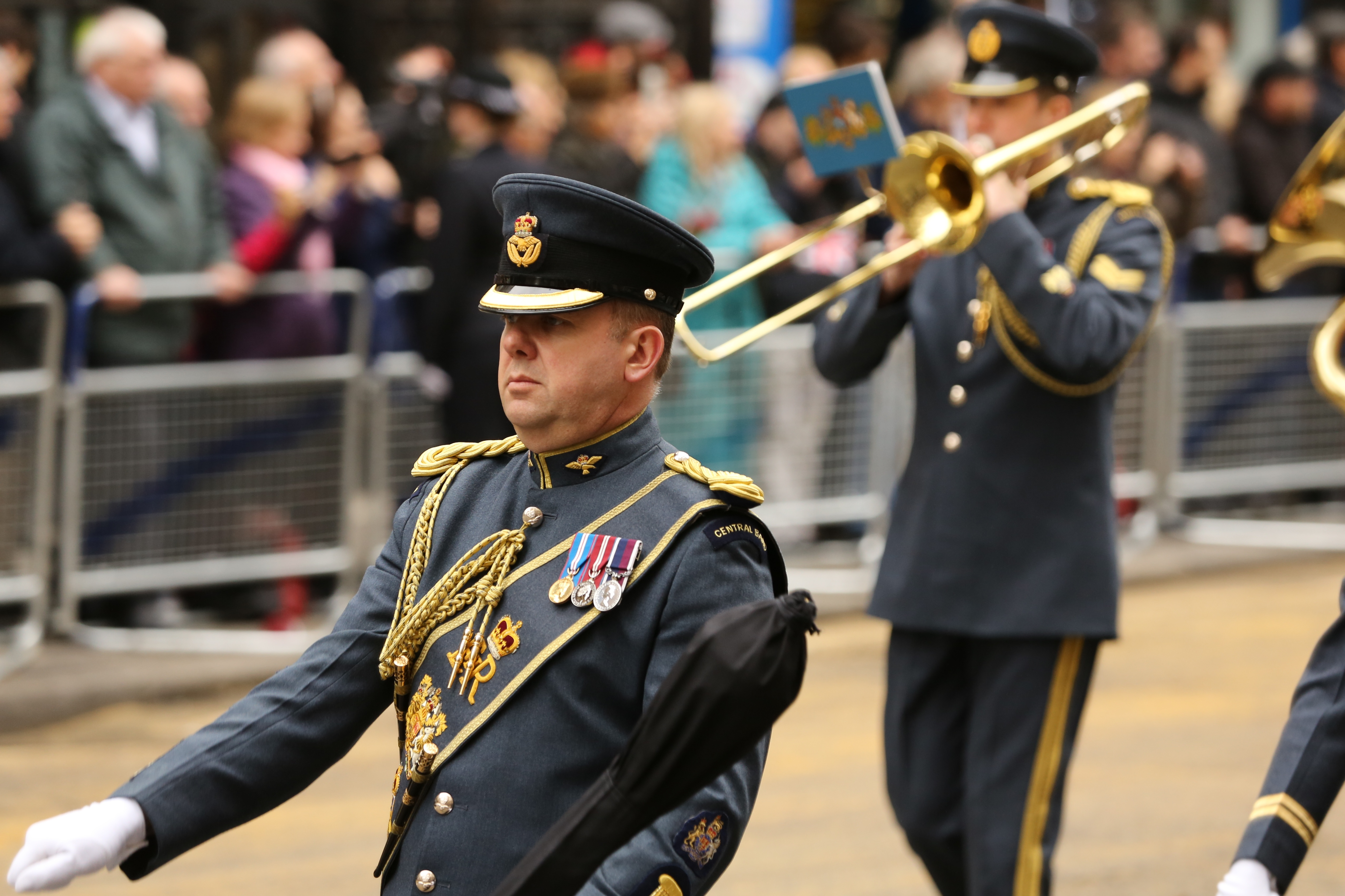
The Central Band at the funeral of Margaret Thatcher.

=== Notable personnel ===
- Henry Walford Davies, founder of the RAF Central Band
- Ronnie Aldrich, British easy listening and jazz pianist
- Malcolm Corden, father of comedian James Corden
- Sid Colin, television and film screenwriter
- Duncan Stubbs, RAF Music Services principal director of music

== See also ==
- Langenbruck bus crash
- The Squadronaires – The RAF's 'Big Band' style group.
