= RAF Henlow =

Royal Air Force support station in Bedfordshire, England

RAF Henlow
- Near Henlow, Bedfordshire in England
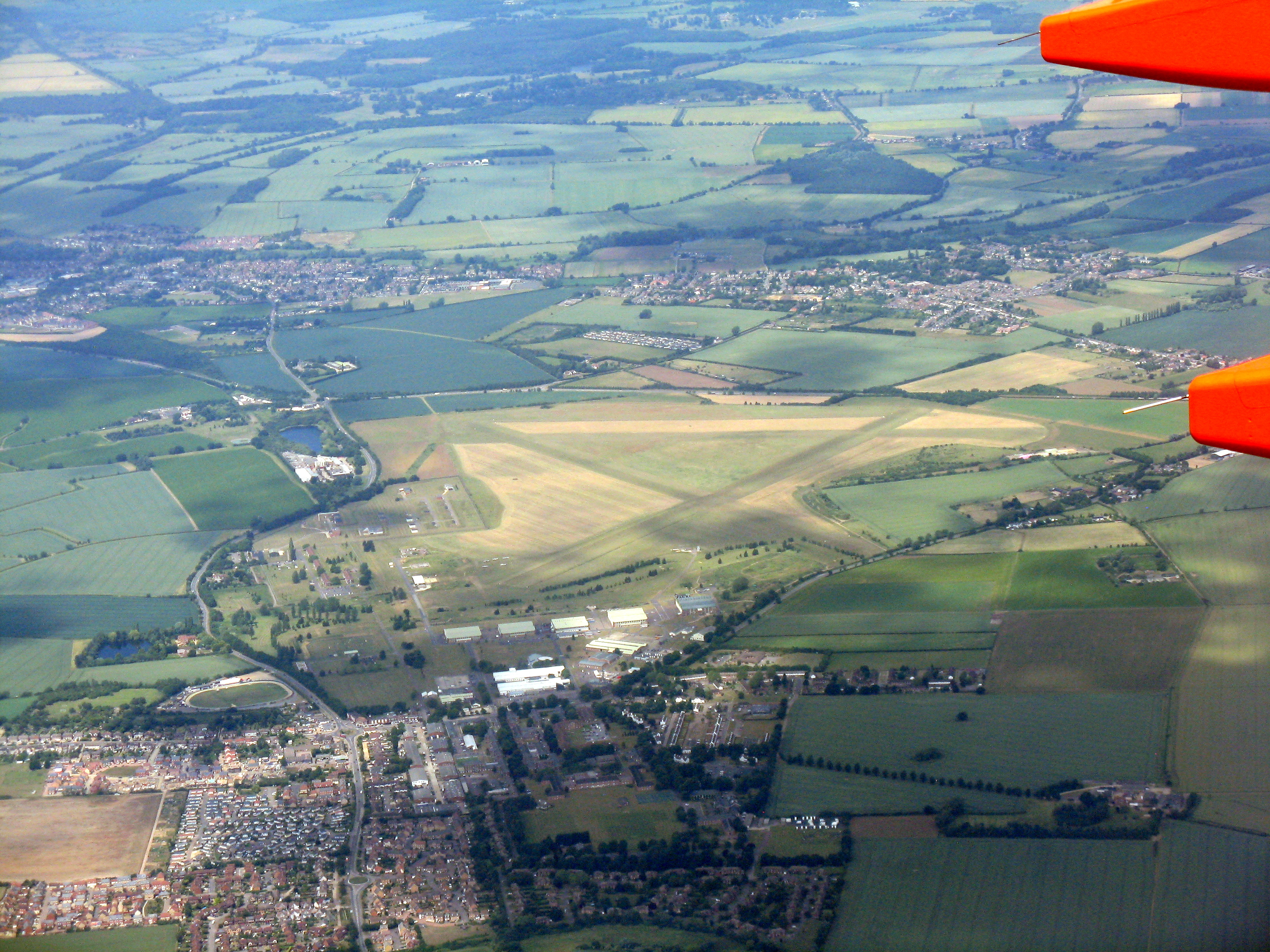
- RAF Henlow from above

- Labor Arma Ministrat (Latin for 'Labour supplies the arms')

Site information
- Type: RAF training station
- Owner: Ministry of Defence
- Operator: Royal Air Force
- Controlled by: No. 2 Group
- Website: Official website

Location
- Shown within Bedfordshire RAF Henlow (the United Kingdom)
- Coordinates: 52°00′56″N 000°18′12″W

Site history
- Built: 1918
- Built by: McAlpine (1918) various since
- In use: 1918–Present

Garrison information
- Current commander: Wing Commander Chris Brooke
- Occupants: RAF Centre of Aerospace Medicine; Joint Arms Control Implementation Group

Airfield information
- Identifiers: ICAO: EGWE
- Elevation: 168 feet (51 m) AMSL
Runways
Direction	Length and surface
02/20	1,199 metres (3,934 ft) Grass
13/31	1,157 metres (3,796 ft) Grass
08R/26L	979 metres (3,212 ft) Grass
08L/26R	736 metres (2,415 ft) Grass
- Source': RAF Henlow Defence Aerodrome Manual

Royal Air Force Henlow or more simply RAF Henlow is a Royal Air Force station in Bedfordshire, England, equidistant from Bedford, Luton and Stevenage. It houses the RAF Centre of Aerospace Medicine and the Joint Arms Control Implementation Group (JACIG), and was home to the Signals Museum, which closed in June 2024. It formerly hosted light aircraft flying and 616 Volunteer Gliding Squadron. The Ministry of Defence announced on 6 September 2016 that the base is set to be closed. As of January 2024, the closure and disposal of the station is expected to take place from 2026. Flying activity ceased in July 2020.

== History ==
Henlow was chosen as a military aircraft repair depot in 1917 and was built by MacAlpine during 1918. Four Belfast Hangars were built and are now listed buildings. Henlow Camp, a civilian settlement, grew up around the base at that time. The depot included a railway station on the Bedford to Hitchin Line.

Originally a repair depot for aircraft from the Western Front, the Station officially opened on 18 May 1918 when Lt Col Robert Francis Stapleton-Cotton arrived with a party of 40 airmen from Farnborough. In May 1920, RAF Henlow became the first parachute testing centre and was later joined by another parachute unit from RAF Northolt. Parachute testing was undertaken with Vimy aircraft and parachutists hanging off the wings and allowing the chute to deploy and enable them to drift back to the ground. The Officers Engineering School moved there in 1924 from Farnborough.

After the First World War, Henlow was home to four aircraft squadrons; No. 19 Squadron RAF, No. 23 Squadron RAF, No. 43 Squadron RAF and No. 80 Squadron RAF. Between 1932 and 1933, Sir Frank Whittle was a student at the RAF technical College on the base. He later spent some time in charge of aero engine testing on the base before being sent to Cambridge. An additional hangar was added to the inventory in the 1930s and this too is now listed.

During the Second World War Henlow was used to assemble the Hawker Hurricanes which had been built at the Hurricane factory operated by Canadian Car and Foundry in Fort William, Ontario, Canada, under the leadership of Elsie MacGill. After test flying in Fort William, they were disassembled and sent to Henlow in shipping containers and reassembled. During Operation Quickforce in 1941, 100 fitters from the base were deployed onto carriers which were shipping Hurricane fighters to Malta. The finished Hurricanes were completed on the decks of the carriers and flown out to Malta. Over 1,000 Hurricanes (about 10% of the total) were built by Canadian Car and Foundry and shipped to Henlow. Henlow was also used as a repair base for many aircraft types under the direction of No. 13 Maintenance Unit.

The empty packing crates that the Hurricane aircraft were shipped in were used to make the original control tower (which has now been replaced by a more modern two-storey Portakabin type). The original tower and parts of the airfield were seen in several scenes in the 1969 war film 'The Battle of Britain'.

A major RAF technical training college was also formed at Henlow in 1947. This was formed from the RAF School of Aeronautical Engineering, formerly at RAF Farnborough, and its purpose was to train cadets and engineering officers. The college was amalgamated with RAF College Cranwell in 1965. The RAF Officer Cadet Training Unit then moved in, but this also moved to Cranwell in 1980.

Henlow then hosted the RAF Signals Engineering Establishment and the Radio Engineering Unit, established in 1980. In 1983, the Land Registry took over part of the site.

In December 2011, RAF Henlow along with 14 other Ministry of Defence sites in the United Kingdom were designated as being dangerously radioactive. The 15 bases were poisoned by "radium that was used to coat the dials of aircraft...so that they could be seen in the dark" during the Second World War.

Administratively, RAF Henlow was part of a combined base, RAF Brampton Wyton Henlow, until RAF Brampton was closed in 2013.

Flying activity ceased in July 2020.

== Based units ==
Notable units based at RAF Henlow.

=== Royal Air Force ===
No. 2 Group (Air Combat Support)

- Air Security Force
  - Forensic Exploitation Flight
    - Digital Forensic Team
    - Scientific Support Unit
- RAF Medical Services
  - RAF Centre of Aerospace Medicine
    - Centre of Aerospace Medicine Headquarters
    - Aviation Medicine Wing
    - Occupational and Environmental Medicine Wing
    - Support Wing

=== Strategic Command ===
Directorate of Overseas Bases

- Joint Arms Control Implementation Group (JACIG)

== Former units ==
The following units were here at some point:

- No. 23 Squadron RAF between 1 July 1925 and 6 February 1927 with the Snipe and Gamecock I
- No. 43 Squadron RAF between 1 July 1925 and 12 December 1926 with the Snipe and Gamecock I
- No. 80 Squadron RAF between 15 March and 9 June 1937 with the Gauntlet II & Gladiator I
- Detachment from No. 241 Squadron RAF between 1941 and 1942 with the Tomahawk IIA
- No. 661 Squadron RAuxAF between 1 May 1949 and 10 March 1957 with the Auster IV, V, AOP.6
- No. 1 Air Stores Park (1940)
- No. 1 AACU 'X' Flight (1939)
- No. 1 AACU 'Y' Flight (1938 & 1939)
- No. 1 AACU 'Z' Flight (1938)
- No. 2 Air Stores Park (1939)
- No. 2 RAF Depot (1937)
- No. 2 Salvage Centre (1939)
- No. 3 Air Stores Park (1939)
- No. 3 Ferry Pool RAF (1947)
- No. 3 Salvage Centre (1939)
- No. 4 Salvage Centre (1939)
- No. 5 (Eastern) Aircraft Repair Depot (1918-20)
- No. 6 Air Stores Park (1939)
- No. 7 Air Stores Park (1939)
- No. 13 Maintenance Unit RAF (1939-48)
- No. 13 School of Technical Training RAF (1940) became No. 14 School of Technical Training RAF (1940-44 & 1945-48 & 1951-52)
- No. 20 Air Stores Park (1940)
- No. 23 Wing Servicing Unit RAF (1940)
- No. 43 Group Communication Flight (1946-47)
- No. 49 Maintenance Unit RAF (1939-40)
- No. 106 Gliding School RAF (1944-55)
- No. 616 Gliding School RAF (1958-84) became No. 616 Volunteer Gliding School RAF (1984-2005)
- No. 1959 Reserve Air Observation Post Flight RAF (1945-55)
- No. 1961 Reserve Air Observation Post Flight RAF (1945-57)
- No. 2709 Squadron RAF Regiment
- No. 2727 Squadron RAF Regiment
- Band of The Queen's Division
- Inland Area Aircraft Depot (1920-26) became Home Aircraft Depot (1926-39)
- Parachute Test Unit (Ministry of Supply)
- Pilotless Aircraft Section RAF (1937-40)
- Queen Bee Flight RAF (1937)
- Rapier Cold Trials Unit (1973 & 1974)
- RAF School of Aeronautical Engineering (Officers)
- Signals Development Unit RAF (1947-50) became Radio Engineering Unit (1950-1966)
- Signals Museum
- Tactical Police Wing
- Tactical Police Squadron

== Signals Museum ==
The Signals Museum, focused on the development of electronic communications by the RAF since the First World War, was established in 1999. The museum closed permanently on 8 June 2024.

== Future ==
On 6 September 2016, the Ministry of Defence (MOD) announced the planned closure of RAF Henlow, with a disposal date of 2020. By 2019, a staged drawdown and closure was expected to take place between 2020 and 2023. In January 2024, the MOD indicated that the closure and disposal would take place from 2026.

== See also ==
- List of Royal Air Force stations
