= Military mascot =

Animals kept by the armed forces for ceremonial purposes

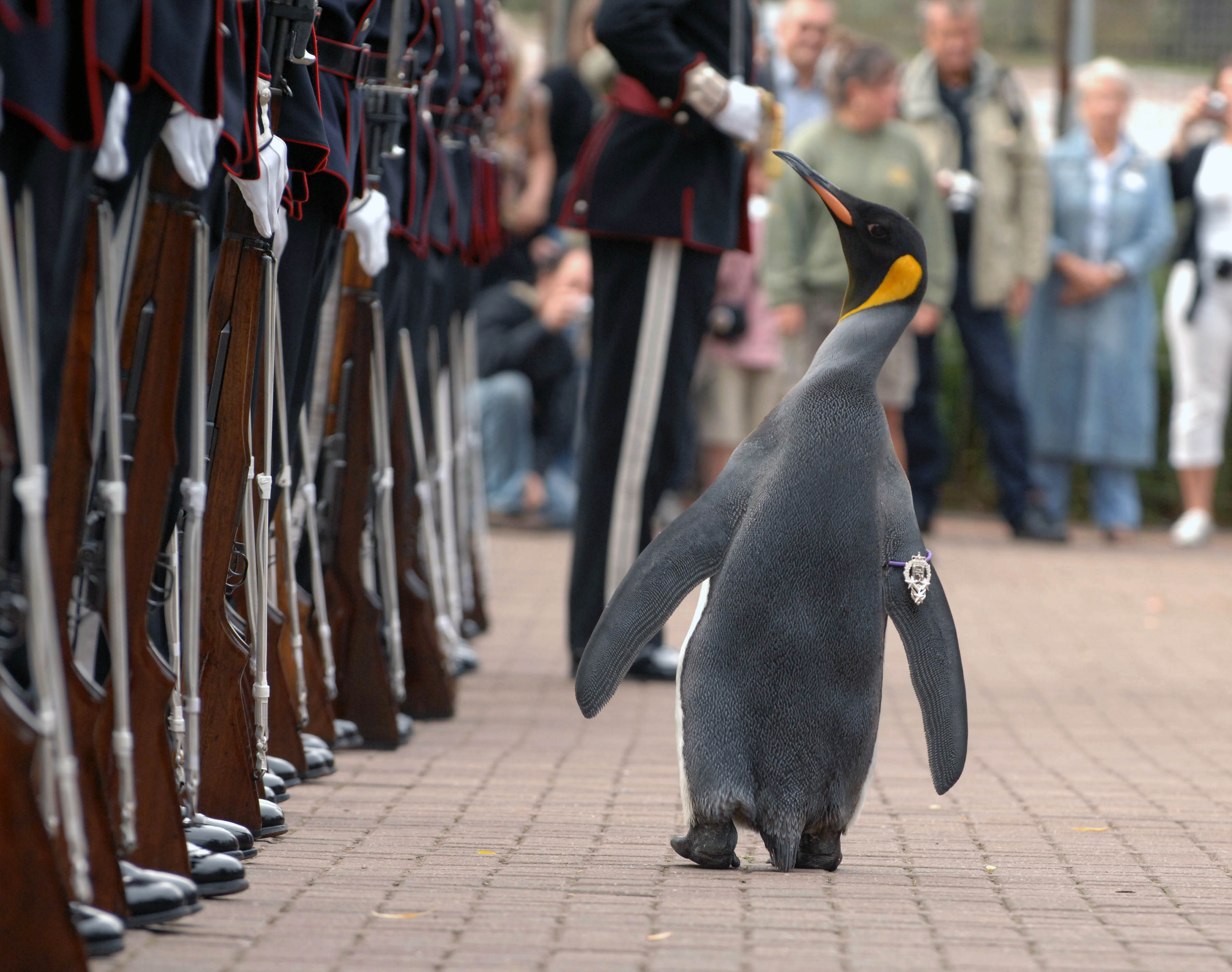
Nils Olav inspects troops of the Norwegian King's Guard, of which he is colonel-in-chief

A military mascot, also known as a ceremonial pet or regimental mascot, is a pet animal maintained by a military unit as a mascot for ceremonial purposes and/or as an emblem of that unit. It differs from a military animal in that it is not employed for use directly in warfare as a weapon or for transport.

== History ==
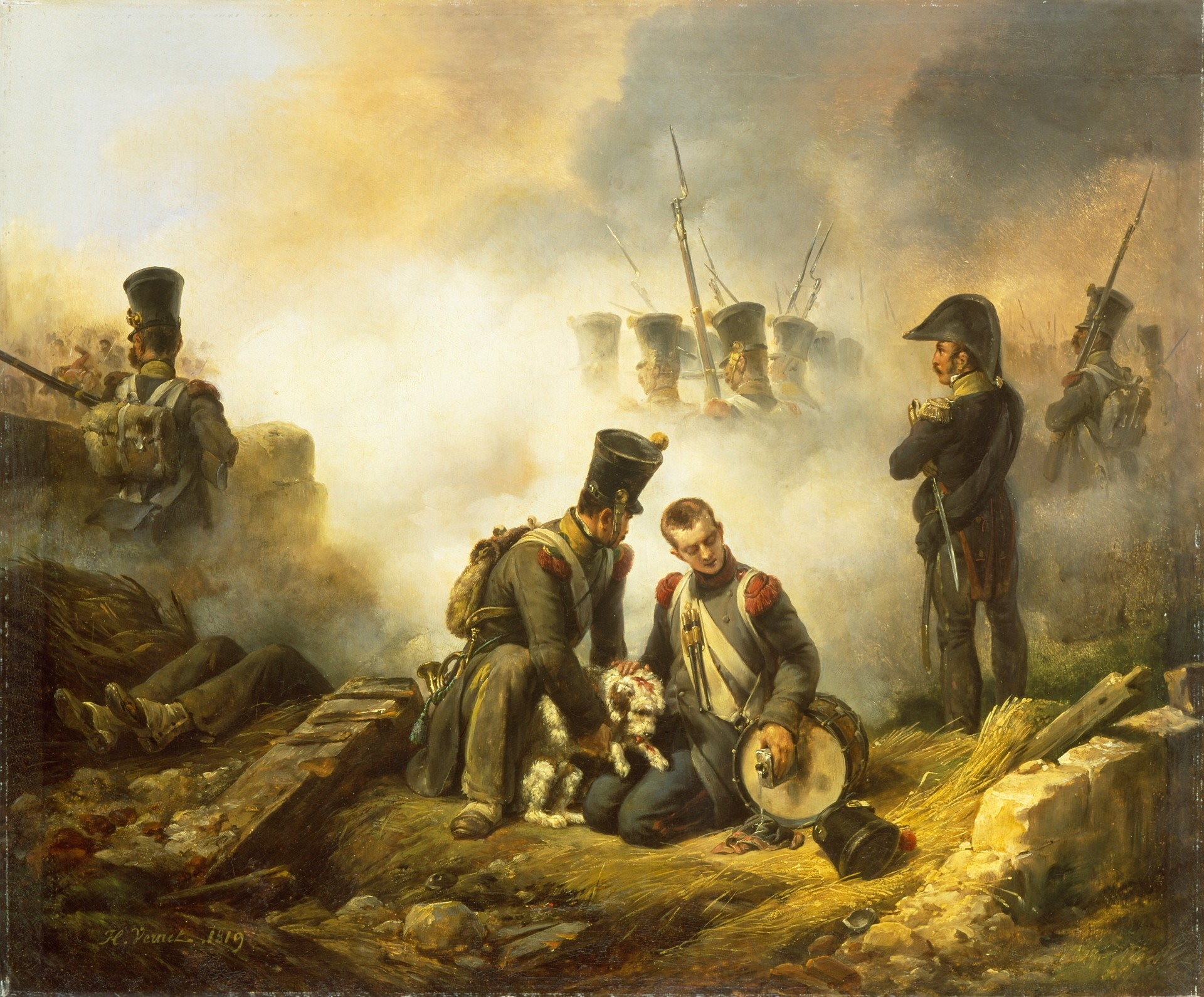
The Dog of the Regiment Wounded by Horace Vernet, 1819

British Army units began to adopt non-working military animals in order to strengthen morale and to be used as a mascot/symbolic emblems for the unit in the 18th century. Animals that were adopted as military mascots were typically brought over by soldiers who went overseas, or were stray animals that were adopted by the unit along the way. However, some mascots were specifically gifted to a unit. Although military mascots typically only served a ceremonial purpose, some animals kept by military units have been utilized for other uses in addition to their role as mascots.

== Australia ==
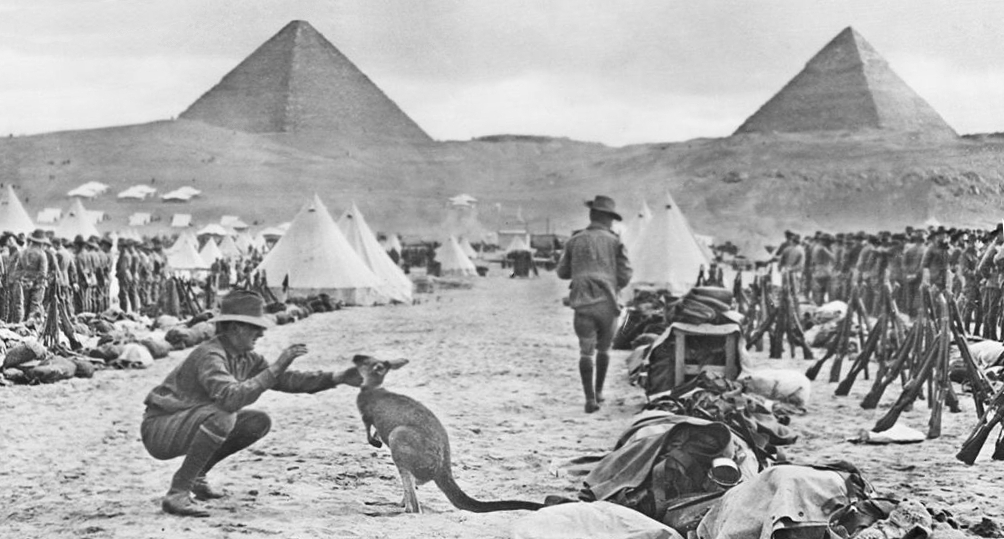
An Australian soldier playing with a kangaroo while deployed in the Sultanate of Egypt. A number of service members brought animals with them during war.

The practice of adopting animal mascots in the armed forces has a long history. Many Australian Imperial Force battalions in World War I brought all sorts of animals along with them, including dogs, kangaroos, koalas and even a Tasmanian devil. These animals offered companionship for the troops, were a way of expressing national pride, raised morale, and offered soldiers some relief from the harsh realities of war. There are many ways that the animals were sourced, including advertising in the newspaper. An advertisement in the Ballarat Courier in March 1916 reads,

Nearly all of the brigades and battalions which have left our shores for the front have had a mascot of one kind or another... The 39th Battalion, which will bear the name of our city, Ballarat, is not yet possessed of a mascot. A gift of a well-bred fox terrier or bull pup would be much appreciated.

There are also examples of call outs for wallabies or kangaroos to be sent to training camps as mascots, and others were provided to battalions as gifts. Some accounts of the acquisition of mascots indicate a rather ad-hoc approach. The Queenslander in December 1914 featured the newly adopted koala mascot of the Second Queensland Contingent Light Horse ('The bear was discovered during a route march to Sandgate, and one of the men climbed the tree and secured it. The koala was at once adopted by the regiment'). Some mascots were accidentally lost prior to embarkation such as the bulldog named Colonel Stone, of the 42nd Battalion, in April 1916.

Several units of the Australian Army maintain their own mascots. A number of battalions of the Royal Australian Regiment maintain their own mascot. The mascot for 1st Battalion is a Shetland pony named Septimus; the mascot for 5th Battalion is a Sumatran tiger named Quintus; and the mascot of 6th Battalion is a blue heeler named Ridgeliegh Blue.

Several units of the Royal Australian Engineers also use a mascot. 2nd Combat Engineer Regiment uses an Australian Terrier named Driver as a mascot; while 3rd Combat Engineer Regiment uses a dingo named Wooly.

Other Australian units that have a mascot include the 2nd Cavalry Regiment, which uses a wedge-tailed eagle named Courage. The 1st Aviation Regiment has a peregrine falcon named Penny Alert.

== Canada ==
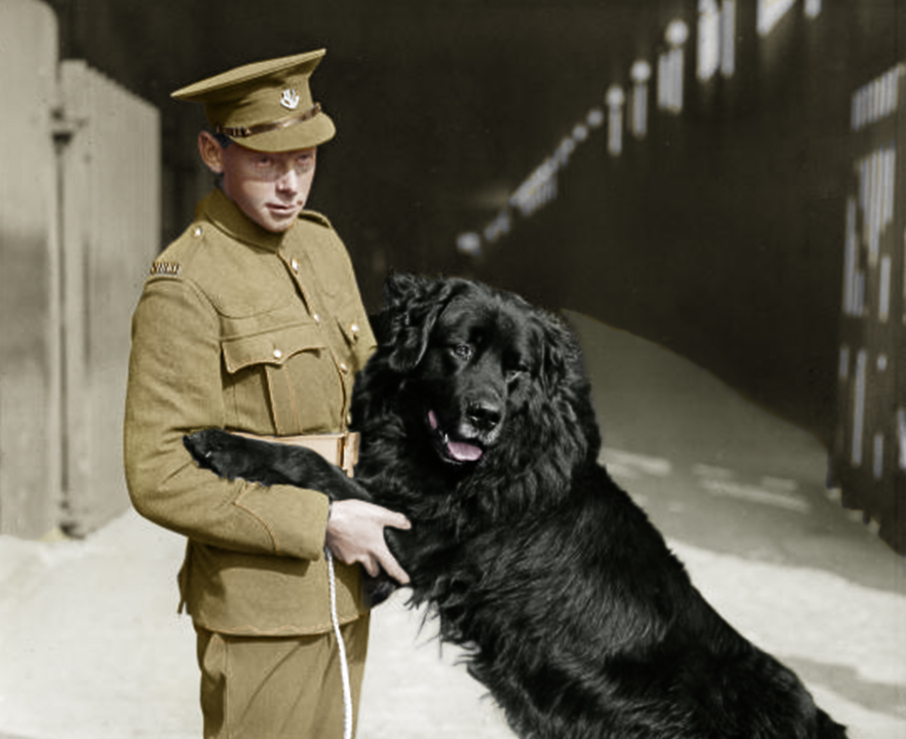
Sable Chief, a Newfoundland dog with his handler. He served as the mascot for the Royal Newfoundland Regiment during the First World War

The tradition of adopting military mascots with Canadian military units originates from British military tradition, with British military units having adopted animal mascots while deployed in Canada. During the late-1830s, a goat named Jacob was used as a mascot for the Citadelle of Quebec. Jacob was later brought to the United Kingdom 1842 and died in 1846. While in the United Kingdom he was awarded a Good Conduct Ring. Other examples of military mascots used by British units deployed in Canada include a bear adopted by the 83rd Regiment of Foot while they were in Canada during the 1840s.

=== Canadian Army ===
The official mascot of the Canadian Army is an anthropomorphic polar bear named Juno. The mascot was named after a naming contest was held in 2003. A live polar bear was later adopted as the "living mascot" of Juno, with the polar bear that was adopted being born on Remembrance Day at the Toronto Zoo in 2015. Named Juno, and made an honorary private of the army before he was promoted to an honorary corporal on his first birthday. On 11 November 2020, he was promoted to an honorary master corporal.

Several individual Canadian Army units have also adopted a live animal as a mascot for their units. During the Second World War, the 8th Canadian Hussars (Princess Louise's) found an injured filly while on deployment during the Italian campaign. The filly was nursed back to health by the unit and was adopted as its mascot, named Princess Louise. Princess Louise was later smuggled with the unit after they were redeployed to northwestern Europe. Princess Louise was finally retired in 1971, with another horse named Princess Louise II taking her place as the regimental mascot.

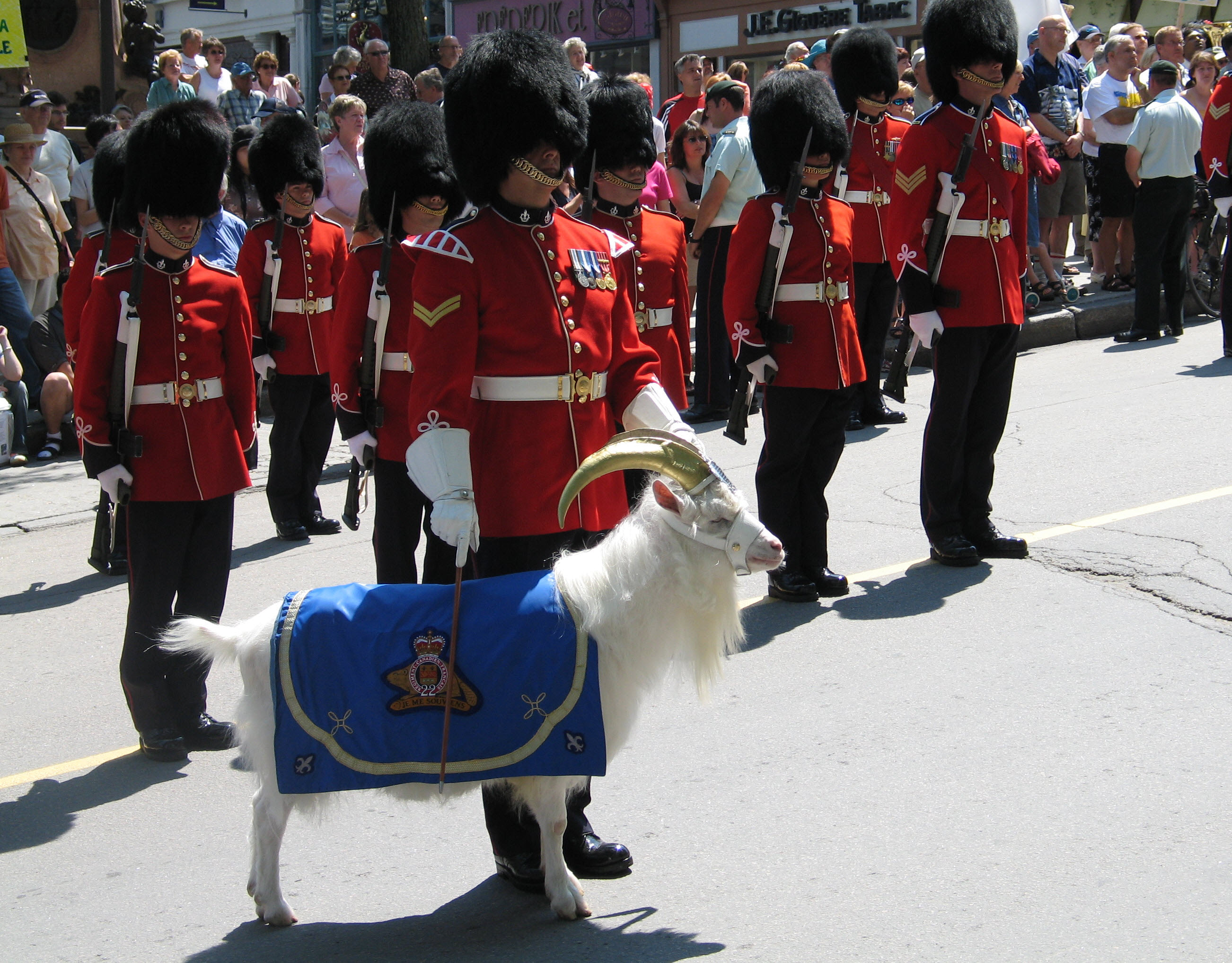
Batisse the Goat, the mascot for the Royal 22^{e} Régiment of the Canadian Army

Goats have also become a common mascot amongst units and installations in the army. In 1955, Queen Elizabeth II presented the Royal 22^{e} Régiment with a bezoar ibex that descended from a pair of goats gifted to Queen Victoria by the Shah of Persia. Named Batisse, the queen continued to send replacement goats to the unit until a breeding pair found in 1972, securing the succession of the mascots for the unit. The unit has maintained 10 goats, all named Batisse as of 2011. Other units and installations that used goats as a mascot includes the Royal Canadian Dragoons, who adopted Peter the Goat during the First World War; and CFB Borden, who adopted Sergeant W. Marktime the goat in 1957.

In addition to living animals, some Canadian units also used inanimate objects as their unit's mascot. A 3.4 metres (11 ft) First Nations pewter figurine originally attached to a factory in Picton, Ontario, was used as the mascot for the Hastings and Prince Edward Regiment. Named Little Chief, the unit brought the mascot over to Europe when it was deployed during the Second World War. However, the mascot was lost in June 1940 while the unit was deployed as a part of the Second British Expeditionary Force to France during Operation Aerial. A 2.1 metres (7 ft) solid pine replacement was ordered and was shipped to the unit in Europe later during the Second World War.

Mascot formerly used by Canadian Army units includes Winnipeg or Winnie, a female black bear and mascot used by the Canadian Army Veterinary Corps (later renamed the Royal Canadian Army Veterinary Corps) during the First World War. Winnipeg was acquired by Lieutenant Harry Colebourn in White River, Ontario, and was named after Colebourn's hometown of Winnipeg. While with Colebourn, Winnipeg served as the pet for 2nd Canadian Infantry Brigade headquarters while it was in the United Kingdom, and as a mascot for the veterinary corps. However orders were given in December 1914 to remove Winnipeg from brigade headquarters, as he would not be able to accompany them on the battlefields of France. Winnipeg was initially loaned to the London Zoo while Colebourn was on deployment, although he later opted to donate him to the zoo after the war. Winnipeg later served as the inspiration for A. A. Milne's Winnie-the-Pooh, who frequented the zoo with his son, Christopher Robin Milne. The 101st Regiment also adopted a mascot during the First World War, Lestock the coyote, that was also donated to a zoo in London after the unit was redeployed to France in 1915. Lestock likeness was later adopted as a part of the unit's cap badge.

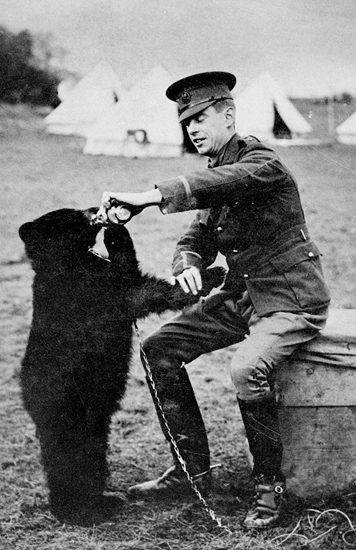
Lieutenant Harry Colebourn with Winnie the Bear, the mascot for the Canadian Army Veterinary Corps and inspiration for Winnie-the-Pooh

The mascot of the Royal Newfoundland Regiment was a Newfoundland dog named Sable Chief, presented to the unit during the First World War. Sable Chief was later struck by a vehicle by accident and died, although his stuffed remains were later brought back to St. John's, Newfoundland and Labrador. Other former mascots used by Canadian Army units includes Wallace the St. Bernard, used by the Canadian Scottish Regiment during the Second World War; Heather the Aberdeen terrier, used by the Calgary Highlanders during the Second World War; and Petty Office Wilbur Duck, an orange-billed white duck used by the Canadian Airborne Regiment during the 1970s.

=== Royal Canadian Air Force ===
The 444 Tactical Helicopter Squadron also used an inanimate object as a mascot, a metal-fashioned hooded snake modelled after the unit's squadron badge. Named Cecil the Snake, the mascot was acquired in Germany while the unit was deployed as a part of Canadian Forces Europe. Because the sculpture had become the target of pranks from the unit's peers in the Royal Canadian Air Force, the metal snake was rarely left out in the open, and its security was entrusted to a junior officer in the unit. Other mascots used by the air force units includes a sculpture of a golden yellow-leg named Twillick, used by the Aircraft Control and Warning Squadron.

=== Royal Canadian Navy ===
The Royal Canadian Navy named an anthropomorphic Newfoundland dog as its official mascot; named SONAR as a result of a naming contest in 2010. Several Royal Canadian Navy ships also used inanimate objects as "living mascots". HMCS Fraser used the head of a golden buck mounted in its bulkhead as a "living" mascot for the ship whereas HMCS Terra Nova used a stuffed penguin named Percy the Penguin as a mascot. During the 1970s, HMCS Gatineau adopted a live animal as a mascot, Tom the Pigeon. The pigeon was adopted by ship in 1972, after it landed exhausted on its deck when the ship was sailing back to its home port from New Zealand.

== India ==
One of the earliest Indian military mascots, dating back to the time of the British Indian Army, sheep named Chinta Bahadur nicknamed 'Chintey' have been with the 5th battalion of the 5th Gorkha Rifles since 1944 when the gurkhas fought in the Burma campaign against Japan. Rifleman Chinta Bahadur was one of the soldiers who went missing in action during the battle. Although his body could not be located after days of searching, the unit was followed back to its destination by a sheep which later became the ceremonial pet of the unit as a way to keep rifleman Bahadur alive in the traditions of the regiment. Chinta Bahadurs report to PT sessions, attend ceremonial functions wearing a coat designed for them and are taken care of by soldiers from the battalion.

The first ever military mascot of the Indian military after independence was presented to the ceremonial band of the Army Medical Corps (AMC) on April 16, 1951, after the marching band of Maharaja Jiwajirao Scindia's Gwalior army was merged with the band of the AMC during the amalgamation of the Gwalior State and its army with the newly formed independent state of India. The Maharaja had sent a black Marwari goat named Munna as a gift to the band of the Indian Army's medical corps. Munna was conferred the rank of a non commissioned officer and became the official military mascot of the band. The present Munna is the ninth in the lineage. The Munna participates in all military ceremonies in which the band is involved and wears an official uniform which consists of musical ankle bells, a maroon scarf, a silver sautoir, headgear bondage hood with feather and insignia of AMC along with three strips revealing his rank.

The Kumaon Regiment of the army has had a mountain goat, SATVIR as their ceremonial mascot since 1963, when a long range patrol team of the 7th Kumaon Battalion was followed back to the units centre by a white mountain goat. The goat was adopted by the unit as and informally named as SATVIR by a team of officers. On the 3rd anniversary of the unit on 11 September 1965, the goat was formally recognized as its mascot and conferred the rank of Lance Naik. SATVIR was promoted to the rank of Naik in 1968 and later Havildar in 1971. SATVIRS are picked from the hilly regions of Kumaon and have an understudy who takes over after the current SATVIR retires. The SATVIR receives the commanding officer of the unit every morning with a handshake and a salute and participate in ceremonies, where he wears a ceremonial cape. The SATVIR goes for a run with the troops on Physical Training Parade at morning and attends the games parade at night. The SATVIR accompanies the unit all over the country, traveling in the special military train with the soldiers. With time the SATVIRSs have come to be seen as a symbol of the unit, because of which the 7th battalion is also known as the SATVIR Battalion.SATVIRs retire at around the age of 10 and are replaced by their understudies. After death, they are given a military funeral and buried after a 3 gun salute.The present SATVIR is the sixth in the line.

In the Indian Air Force, No. 4 Squadron famously maintained a sheep as its squadron mascot during World War II — a tradition that began in Kohat and continued across postings, including in Burma. The sheep became a symbol of unit identity and morale.

== New Zealand ==
The New Zealand Army has had a practice of bringing regimental pets since World War I and personnel have continued doing so through most conflicts the army has taken part in such as the Korean War, Malayan Emergency, Vietnam War and more recently in Afghanistan. The last surviving veteran of Gallipoli is in fact a tortoise brought back from that battle.

== Norway ==
The Norwegian His Majesty The King's Guard has a penguin called Nils Olav as an official mascot and its colonel-in-chief.

== South Africa ==
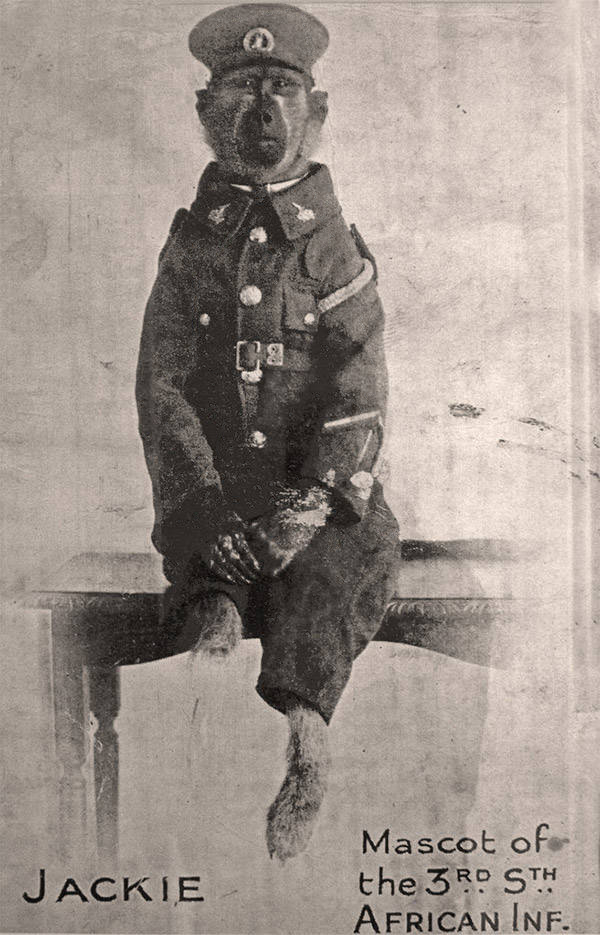
Corporal Jackie poses for a photograph in his South African military uniform

Corporal Jackie (Pretoria, 1913 - May 23, 1921) was a female baboon owned by Albert Marr accepted as mascot of the 3rd (Transvaal & Rhodesian) South African Regiment. After three years of enduring all the trench warfare ordeal at the Western front, Jackie was seriously wounded in the German Spring Offensive (Battle of the Lys), April 17 or 18th, in front of Wijtschaete (East Kemmel sector). Due to shell fragmentation Jackie lost his right leg, broke his left foot and had a jagged wound in the arm. He was treated by Capt. dr. RN Woodsend, a young R.A.M.C. surgeon on the frontline.

Jackie's gender was revealed by Lt-Col W.J.S. Harvey, D.S.O., R.A.M.C. during hospitalization in Casualty Clearing Station No 36 (Watten, France); why her sex was concealed remains unclear. In London, (s)he marched in the Lord Major's parade and back in Pretoria he was given the Pretoria Citizen's Service Medal and promoted corporal. In May 1921, Jackie's wound became infected and blood poisoning set in. (S)He died on May 23, 1921. By special permission of the municipality he was buried on his owner's farm in Villieria, and a regimental tombstone was placed over his grave.

== Spain ==
The current mascot of the Spanish Legion is a goat. It usually appears at parades and ceremonies to lead the marching troops. It is usually dressed in a Legion side cap and accompanied by a Legionary, alongside the Legion's marker guard (gastadores).

Other animals have been used by the Legion in the past, including Barbary apes (the only wild monkey species in Europe), Barbary sheep, bears, and parrots.

== Sri Lanka ==
The mascot of the Sri Lanka Light Infantry is Kandula the elephant.

== Sweden ==
The mascot of the Gotland Regiment is the ram Harald VII, successor to Harald VI.

== United Kingdom ==
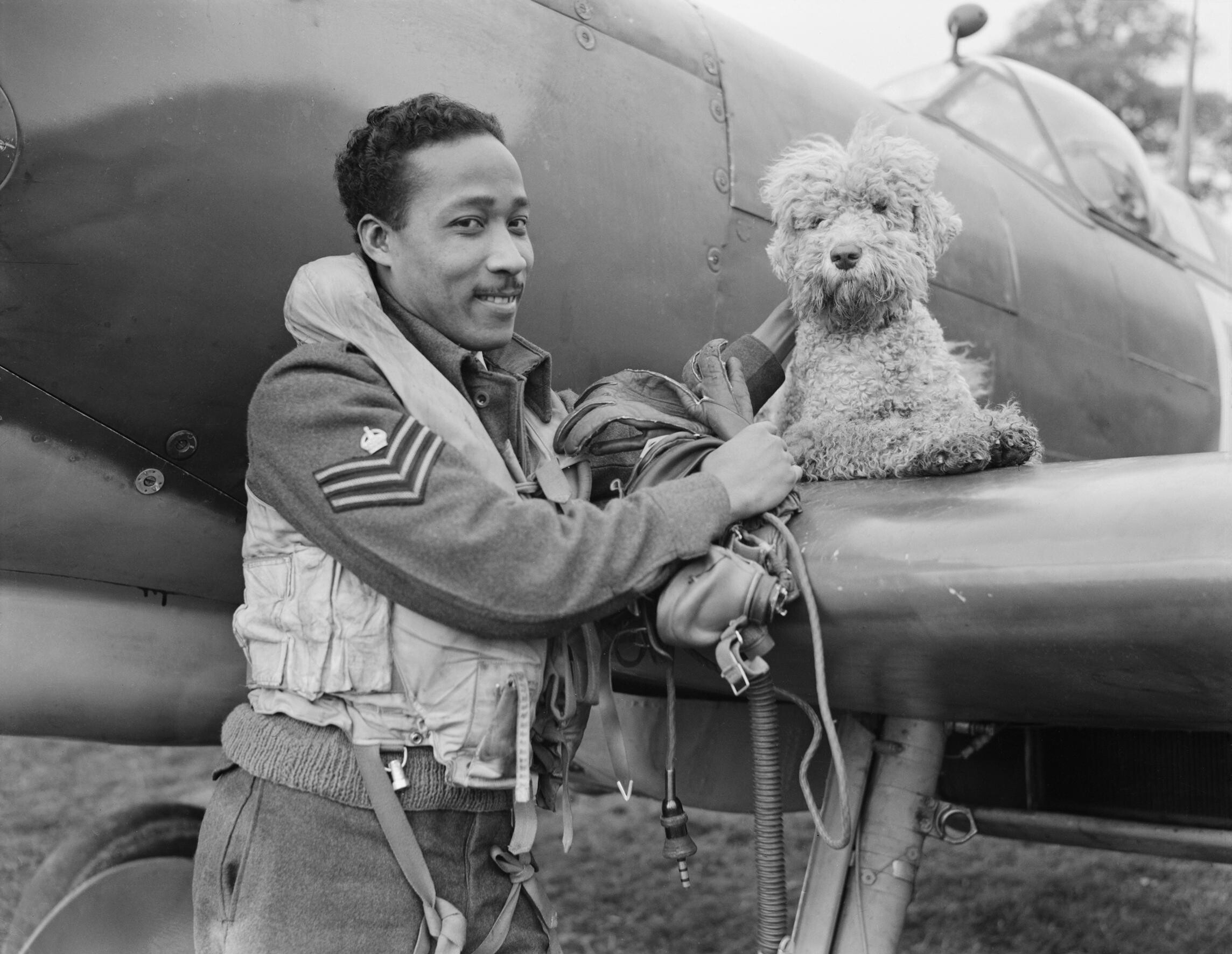
Flight Sergeant James Hyde, a fighter pilot serving with No 132 Squadron, Royal Air Force, pictured by a Supermarine Spitfire with 'Dingo', the squadron commander's pet dog c. 1944

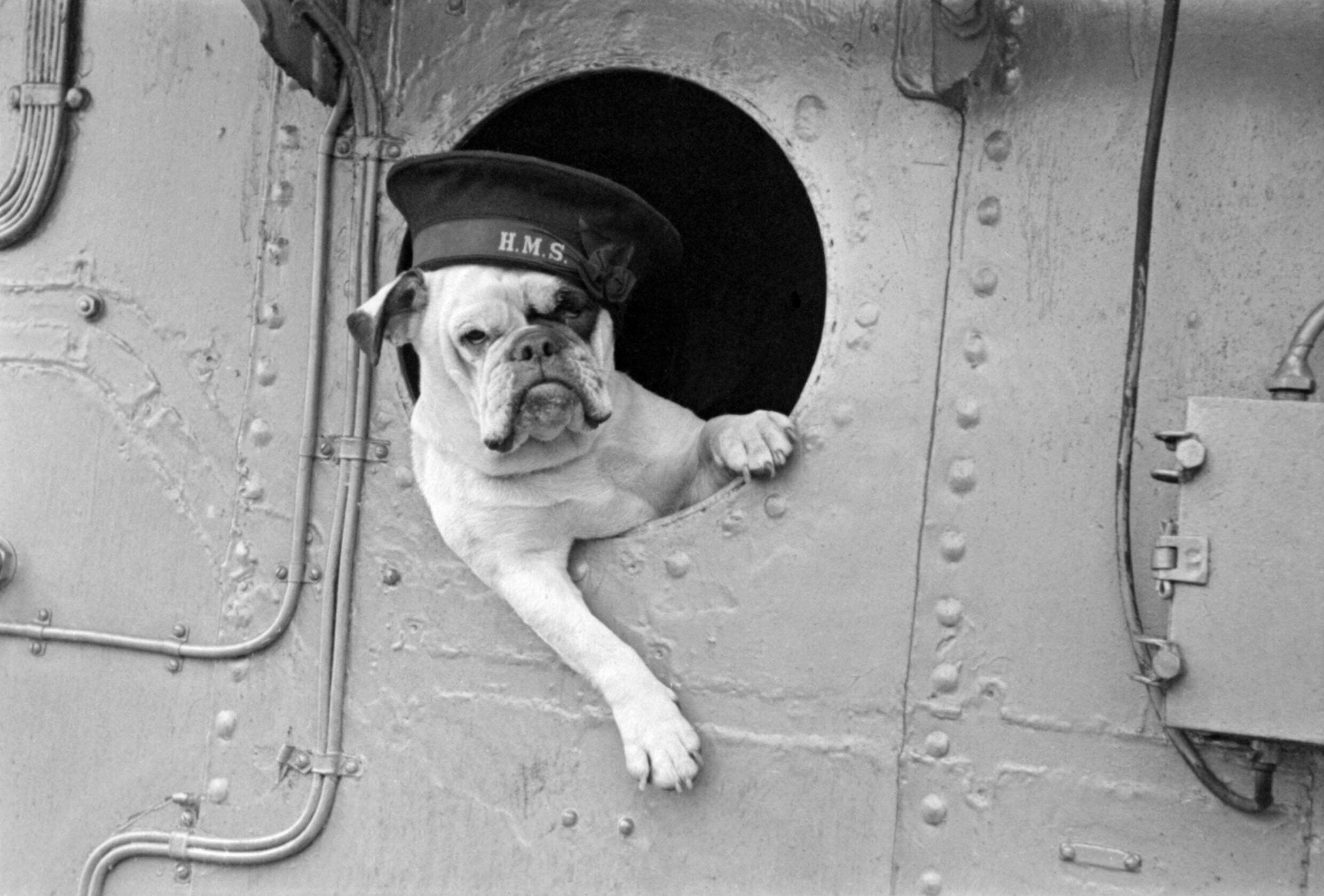
Venus, the bulldog mascot aboard HMS Vansittart, 1941

Regiments of the British Army have long been prone to adopt members of the animal world as their mascots: dogs, goats and ponies are just a few that have graced ceremonial parades. When the custom of having regimental mascots first started is not clear; the earliest record is that of a goat belonging to the Royal Welsh Fusiliers in the 1775 American War of Independence. Some mascots in the British Army are indicative of the recruiting area of a regiment, such as the Derbyshire Ram, Staffordshire Bull Terrier, Irish Wolfhounds and Welsh Goats.

Boy (also Boye), a white hunting poodle of Prince Rupert, has been recorded as the first official British Army Dog.

British Army mascots are classified as either regimental pets or regimental mascots. The former are unofficial mascots since they are not recognized by the Army, while the latter are official mascots, having been recognized by the Army. Official British Army mascots are entitled to the services of the Royal Army Veterinary Corps, as well as quartering and food at public expense. It costs the Army roughly £40,000 a year for the upkeep of official mascots. There are also mascots whose upkeep are borne by the regiment or unit itself. They are unofficial mascots which are properly referred to as regimental pets.

The Army is keen in preserving the distinction between pets kept by the soldiers and official mascots of the regiments. The case for official mascot recognition is presented before the Army Honours and Distinction Committee. By getting an official status, the mascot receives a regimental number, assumes a proper rank with prospects of promotion and gets its fair share of Army rations. There are three rules set down in 1953 that need to be hurdled to get official mascot status. First, the regiment must comply with the welfare guidelines issued by the Army Veterinary Corps to ensure that the mascot is properly fed and housed. Second, the regiment's commanding officer must give approval before the case goes to the Army Honours and Distinctions Committee. Third, the committee will consider whether the mascot is "appropriate", can take an active part in army life, including ceremonial occasions, and have a symbolic and historic connection with the regiment.

A total of seventeen ceremonial pets are kept by eleven Army regiments, but only ten are recognized as official regimental mascots by the Army. So far, the animals that have made the grade of official regimental mascot are the horse, pony, wolfhound, goat, ram and antelope.

=== 1st The Queen's Dragoon Guards ===
The 1st The Queen's Dragoon Guards' mascot is a Welsh Mountain Pony named Emrys. On 26 February 2016, Queen Elizabeth II accepted the recommendation of the Army Honours and Distinctions Committee that 1st The Queen's Dragoon Guards be allowed to keep a mascot. A Welsh Mountain Pony was selected to reflect the regiment's Welsh heritage.

The Mascot's full title is 16851959 Tpr Emrys Forlan Jones. His number embodies the years of formation for the Queen's Bays and King's Dragoon Guards and the year they were amalgamated to form the QDG in 1959. Emrys is a name steeped in Welsh history and mythology. Forlan is the name of the person who donated the mascot to the regiment. Jones is a common surname in the QDG, so is always accompanied by the last three numbers of the soldiers service number. Because of this, Emrys can also be known as Tpr Jones 959.

Emrys is bay-coloured as was the tradition of the QDG's antecedent Regiment, The Queen's Bays. The Mascot is accompanied by a handler, known as the 'Farrier Major'. He is identified by a unique rank insignia for the regiment; four inverted chevrons, an inverted horseshoe and crown. Emrys and the Farrier Major live and train at Robertson Barracks in Norfolk.

=== Royal Scots Dragoon Guards ===
The Royal Scots Dragoon Guards' mascot was a drum horse named Talavera. She was the official regimental mascot and had her own rank and ration book. Her predecessor, named Ramillies, was presented to the regiment by their colonel-in-chief, Queen Elizabeth II at the Royal Windsor Horse Show in 1987 and assumed his duties in 1989. Ramillies was a very large horse, standing over 18 hands high. After participating in the Edinburgh Military Tattoo in August 2002, She was Retired to the Horse Trust in 2018 and Died in 2021.

=== Queen's Royal Hussars ===
Queen's Royal Hussars' mascot is a drum horse named Alamein. Drum horses are used by British cavalry units in ceremonials as part of their regimental bands. As their name suggests, these horses carry two kettle drums, plus a rider. Because the drums are made of solid silver, a drum horse must be big and powerful to carry this great weight. The drum horse's main role is to stand still on parades.

The tradition of the drum horse dates back to the mid-eighteenth century. By command of King George II, the two silver kettle drums captured at sword's point by the King's Own Regiment of Dragoons, later the 3rd The King's Own Hussars, from the French at the Battle of Dettingen in 1743 are to be carried by a drum horse ridden by a sergeant kettle drummer on ceremonial occasions – a custom still observed by the Queen's Royal Hussars which have always had drum horses. They are a special and central part of the regiment. They play centre stage during ceremonial occasions as the drum horse for the cavalrymen.

The present drum horse is officially named Alamein after one of the regiment's battle honours. The soldiers of the regiment gave him the nickname Dudley after the West Midlands town where many of their troops are recruited. Dudley was given to the regiment in March 2008. The five-year-old Irish Grey gelding was reared at Abergavenny's Triley Fields Equestrian Centre in Monmouthshire. He is still young and wary but is already part of the soldiers' affections even before he has gotten to know everybody. Dudley is fairly massive, around 19 hands high (approximately 190 cm) and has large hooves. He is kept at the Paderborn Equestrian Centre, close to the regimental barracks. The predecessor drum horse, named Winston, which was presented by Queen Elizabeth The Queen Mother, died in 2006. A drum horse remains the regimental mascot for life. An earlier drum horse mascot named Peninsula, a gray Clydesdale, was also presented by Queen Elizabeth The queen mother in 1988.

The soldier who looks after Dudley is known as Horse's Groom. He is the one responsible for turning Dudley from being just a large animal into a drum horse. He exercises Dudley by taking him for a couple of walks around the yard as the drum horse is ridden only on parades. The Horse's Groom assists the rider with tacking up and getting the horse ready for parades. The drum horse has an unusual steering mechanism. Normally horses' reins are steered with the hands, but drum horses' reins are steered with a rider's feet.

=== Parachute Regiment ===
Two Shetland Ponies named Pegasus and Falkland have been used as mascots for the Parachute Regiment. The first pony mascot within The Parachute Regiment dates back to 1950, when Lt. Ben C. Arkle presented the 1st Battalion with a Black New Forest pony called Pegasus I. The 2nd Battalion were next to have a mascot when they purchased a black gelding in 1954, called Bruneval I. In August 1954, the 3rd Battalion also purchased their mascot, a White Welsh pony stallion, and called him Coed Coch Samswn. The three pony mascots were to parade together for the first time on 15 April 1955 during a visit by Prince Philip, Duke of Edinburgh to Rushmoor Arena.

It was only in June 1955, after a request by the Regimental Council to the War Office, that permission was granted to the regiment to have pony mascots.

At the conference of Commanding Officers on 11 November 1965, it was agreed that the battalions should no longer have their own pony mascots. The main reasons were the rising costs of looking after them, finding suitable accommodation and handlers. It was also impractical for the mascots to accompany battalions overseas as they moved by air. The decision was endorsed by the Regimental Council on 12 November 1965. All battalion mascots had found new homes outside the regiment by 1966. Pegasus I of I Para and Coed Cock Samswn of III Para were taken by the East Riding branch of the Parachute Regimental Association (PRA). Bruneval II was sold to the Juniors Leaders Regiment RCT Taunton.

Pte. Ringway, a Skewbald Miniature Shetland Stallion, then became the official Regimental Mascot. He was presented to the regiment by the PRA in 1962 and was looked after by the Junior Parachute Company at Depot PARA, except when it was required with a battalion abroad. He progressed through the ranks. Following a successful performance at the Allied Forces Parade in 1975, while in Berlin with 1 PARA, he was promoted to sergeant. The German press and National TV were invited to the barracks to see him march into the sergeants' mess by the Band and Drums and given his new sergeant's coat by the commanding officer. On being taken into the mess, the regimental sergeant. major read him the mess rules. The mayor of Spandau sent him his congratulations and a bag of carrots, while an elderly lady sent twenty Deutschmarks to buy food. He died while still with 1 PARA in Berlin in 1975. Obituary notices were placed in the Times and Telegraph newspapers.

After the death of Sgt. Ringway, records from the Airborne Assault Archive show that there was some discussion whether the regiment should continue to have a mascot. However, in February 1977, Sgt. Tex Banwell presented the regiment a Shetland pony which was named Pegasus II (or Peggy to the soldiers). He was flown out to Berlin on a Hercules to join 2 PARA. During Queen Elizabeth II's Birthday Parade in 1977, he collapsed from sun stroke but recovered. He was promoted to lance corporal in 1978 after being inspected by the colonel-in-chief, Charles, Prince of Wales. In 1979, he was euthanized following a leg injury.

On 5 May 1980, the next Shetland pony mascot, Pte. Pegasus III, was donated to the regiment by Mr. Peter Heims as a replacement to Lance Corporal Pegasus II. Pte. Pegasus III came to the regiment aged 5 years old, having been rescued from a life of neglect and mistreatment. On 13 May 1980, he was inspected on parade by the Colonel-in-Chief. Following his steadiness on parade on Airborne Forces Day in 1980 and participation in the parade of the Royal Wedding, he was promoted in July 1981 to lance corporal. This was followed by promotions to corporal in March 1983 and sergeant in January 1990. Not all public duties went according to plan. During an appearance in 1991 at the Savoy Hotel, he fell asleep while on public duty. Then on the occasion of the Queen Mother's Birthday Parade, he attended a call of nature while on parade.

In July 1985, because of concerns over the health of Sgt. Pegasus III, it was decided to acquire a second pony as a stable companion, to be trained ready to take over. The new pony, a three-year-old brown Shetland pony named Dodger, was presented to the regiment by Mrs. Mary Dipley of Stroud, Kent in July 1986. In his younger years Dodger was described as having a "frisky temperament" that frustrated the efforts of the Pony Major to train him for ceremonial duties. On the 50th Anniversary of the Parachute Regiment in July 1992, Dodger was renamed "Falkland", as tradition only allows the use of a battle honour as a name ten years after the event.

Meanwhile, the health of Sgt. Pegasus III recovered and he was soon on parade for the Paras. Sgt. Pegasus also participated in the wedding ceremony of Sgt. Soane, his Pony Major, in 1990. In November 2001, the mascots were moved from Aldershot to Colchester to co-locate with the new RHQ and the regimental band.

The present mascots are Lance Corporal Pegasus IV and Falkland I. The predecessor mascot, Sgt Pegasus III, retired in November 1998 while one of the present mascots, Falkland I is retiring soon. He is still fit and well, but the regiment has decided that it is time for him to end his military service since he will be 26 years old in January 2009. Falkland was offered a retirement home by Rosie Gibson (who was formally married to CO 1 Para Brig Paul Gibson) at Shetland Pony Club in Cobham Surrey. Still healthy in 2015, he is popular with child visitors and took part in the 30th anniversary of the Falklands War parade where he led the veterans, led by the son of former Co 1 Para Dick Trigger. Falkland was also the guest of honour at the 2014 Remembrance Calvacade in Albury Surrey to remember the War Horses lost in WWI. Falkland also attends community fetes, raising money for combat stress.

The regiment is now in search of a black Shetland pony, preferably a gelding, and under 6 years old. Requirements include a gentle nature and elegance when marching up and down, the capablity of standing still for prolonged periods of time, and it must be able to handle interactions with humans that it has not been introduced to yet.

The pony mascots travel round the country (United Kingdom), leading parades and marching in front of veterans and the regiment. They also travel to local shows to greet their public and even as far as France and the Netherlands each year for the military anniversaries. In winter, it is quieter for the ponies, but they are regularly exercised and lunged.

=== Royal Regiment of Scotland ===
Two shetland ponies named Cruachan and Islay are used as regimental mascots for the Royal Regiment of Scotland. There have been three shetland ponies mascots in the Argyll and Sutherland Highlanders, all called Cruachan (IV). The shetland pony and his mate are looked after by a "pony Major" whose duties include their welfare and leading Cruachan during his many appearances at Highland games, fairs, military parades and annual Edinburgh Tattoo. The first, Cruachan I (1929–1939), formally became the regimental mascot in 1929 when he was presented to the 1st Battalion, The Argyll and Sutherland Highlanders by Princess Louise, Duchess of Argyll. The third Cruachan retired in 2012 and will be replaced by the fourth. After the Scottish regiments merged to become constituent battalions of the Royal Regiment of Scotland, Cruachan was adopted as the regimental mascot. The current mascot is Cruachan IV.

In July 1928, Princess Louise, Colonel-in-Chief of the Argyll and Sutherland Highlanders, visited the 1st Battalion at Shorncliffe. Before leaving, she intimated that she wants to make some presentation to the battalion to mark her visit and asked what the officers and men would like. It was suggested that if she presented the battalion with a mascot, such as a shetland pony, they would constantly be reminded of their Colonel-in-Chief. Princess Louise was delighted with the suggestion, and a few days after her return to London, she wrote saying that she had already seen the shetland pony which she will propose to give to the battalion. The Shetland was the smallest pony in Lady Hunloke's herd and because of this was known as "Tom Thumb". In accepting the gift, it was suggested that the battalion rename the pony with a more imposing name. With Lady Hunloke's approval, the battalion named him Cruachan after Ben Cruachan, an iconic mountain in the regiment's namesake lieutenancy of Argyll and Bute. Rather appropriately it was also the battle cry of the Clan Campbell, of which the Duke of Argyll was Chief.

Cruachan I was led by a drummer boy during parades, as it was some years before a Pony Major was appointed. Cruachan's spirit was well known to the soldiers of the battalion. He could do a number of tricks on request, such as standing on an upturned bucket to "give a paw", if offered sugar and rearing up on his hind legs. However, his playfulness also extended to kicking unwary passers-by and escaping from his stable. Occasionally he could be seen running around camp with a number of soldiers in pursuit. Cruachan I was regimental mascot until he retired in 1939 when the battalion went on active service in Palestine. He was put out to grass at a farm near Oxford, where he died on 11 April 1942 at the age of 17.

The next regimental mascot was Cruachan II (1952 - 1979), whose full name was Cruachan of Braes of Greenock. He was a dark-brown ponies, standing 9 hands high. He was born on 14 April 1950. His sire was Bergastor of Transy (1360) and his dam was Pamina OF Transy (4667). He was bred by the wife of Lt. Colonel Roger G. Hyde, an officer in the regiment, at the Braes of Greenock in Callander.

Cruachan II was presented to the regiment by Mrs. Roger G. Hyde on 17 August 1952 at Princes Street Station in Edinburgh when the 1st Battalion returned to the United Kingdom from service in Hong Kong and Korea. His first parade was eight days later when he led the Battalion down Princes Street. Enormous crowds lined the streets to watch the parade, and although it was his first appearance, Cruachan was very well-behaved. He immediately caught the imagination of the public and was always in demand for events such as the Edinburgh Military Tattoo and the Horse of the Year Show. Cruachan became infamous for his stubborn temperament and fondness for beer, particularly Guinness. He bit the glove of Queen Elizabeth II who was inspecting the Argylls on parade; the Queen, who was very fond of horses, went over to pat him and he bit the flowers she was holding. On more than one occasion he was "punished" for drunk behaviour while on duty by being locked up in the stables with his Pony major. Cruachan II held the rank of lance corporal. He retired from active duty to a farm in Oxfordshire in 1979 after serving the regiment for 27 years and died at age 35 on 2 September 1985.

The last regimental mascot of the Argyll and Sutherland Highlanders as an independent regiment was Cruachan III, who was presented to the regiment in October 1995 when he was six years old. Cruachan was purchased by private subscription of the serving soldiers and officers of the regiment. He is a pony stallion, standing 9.1 hands high and comes from the regimental area, Alloa. His sire was Harviestown Phyllapine (3003), a Reserve Champion at the Highland Show, and his dam was Harviestown Sylemma (13874).

On ceremonial occasions, Cruachan is dressed in a green tartan saddlecloth which is bordered with yellow and embroidered on both sides with the Royal Regiment of Scotland badge and cipher in gold and silver thread. On the saddlecloth is a stripe of a lance corporal and five medals: Northern Ireland, Iraq, Bosnia, The Queen's Jubilee and an Accumulative Service Medal. He wears an in-hand bridle with a red and white diced headband and a snaffle bit, and over his saddlecloth he wears a black leather roller and crupper. His first public appearance was in a parade with the 1st Battalion on Balaklava Day at a Drumhead Service held on the Battalion Square before the director of infantry on 25 October 1995. On 2 July 2011, Queen Elizabeth II accompanied by Prince Philip, Duke of Edinburgh presented the new colours of six of the seven battalions of the Royal Regiment of Scotland in Holyrood Park in Edinburgh. On this historic day during the Presentation of the Colours Parade, Cruachan III marched in front of all six battalions of the regiment.

Cruachan III was promoted to lance corporal from private in 2001. He was reclassified as a battalion mascot in 2006 as the Argyll and Sutherland Highlanders was amalgamated with five other Scottish regiments to form the Royal Regiment of Scotland. The Argylls became the 5th Battalion of this new large regiment on 28 March 2006. Cruachan was reinstated as a regimental mascot when he was adopted as mascot of the Royal Regiment of Scotland in 2009. He used to live near Sterling, Scotland with a stable companion gimp named Islay. They now live in Redford Barracks, Edinburgh, Scotland. In 2011, he celebrated his 22nd birthday. He made his final public appearance at the 2012 Royal Edinburgh Military Tattoo and retired.

=== Royal Irish Regiment ===
An Irish Wolfhound named Brian Boru is used as a mascot for the Royal Irish Regiment. In 1970, an Irish Wolfhound, named Brian Boru I, was presented as mascot by a Major Hayes, an officer in the Royal Irish Rangers, on his retirement. Brian Boru became the mascot of the Royal Irish Regiment when it was formed in 1992 with the amalgamation of the Royal Irish Rangers and the Ulster Defence Regiment.

The name Brian Boru was to be used for all succeeding mascots, with just the addition of a Roman numeral to denote succession. The present mascot is Brian Boru IX whose wolfhound name is Finn. He was recruited in April 2011 when he was a twelve-week-old puppy. He was born on 8 January 2011 when the regiment was in theatre in Afghanistan. His predecessor, Brian Boru VIII also called by his wolfhound name, Merlin, died of a heart attack on 16 December 2010 at age 6. The regimental mascot is based in Tern Hill near Market Drayton.

=== Irish Guards ===
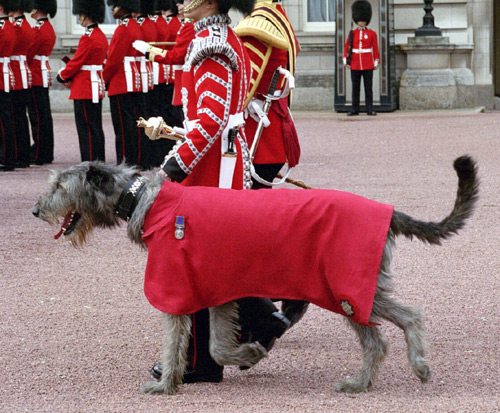
An Irish Wolfhound is used as the mascot for the Irish Guards

An Irish Wolfhound named Turlough Mor (kennel name Seamus) is used as the mascot for the Irish Guards. The regimental mascot is an Irish Wolfhound. The first mascot was presented to the Irish Guards in 1902 by the members of the Irish Wolfhound Club, who hoped the publicity would increase the breed's popularity with the public. It was named Brian Boru, after one of Ireland's legendary chieftains and given the nickname Paddy. There have been 16 more since, all named after Irish High Kings or legendary chieftains. The mascot is a firm favourite of both the regiment and the public. It leads the battalion on all major parades. The present regimental mascot, Seamus, is currently in training and will make his first official appearance on St Patrick's Day 2022.

On 26 July 1961, the wolfhound mascot was admitted to the select group of official Army mascots entitling him to the services of the Royal Army Veterinary Corps, as well as quartering and food at public expense. Originally, the mascot was in the care of a drummer boy, but is now looked after by one of the regiment's drummers and his family. However, new mascots spend their first six months at regimental headquarters under the watchful eye of the regimental adjutant so they can be gradually introduced to regimental life.

The Irish Guards are the only Guards regiment permitted to have their mascot lead them on parade. During the Trooping the Colour, however, the mascot marches only from Wellington Barracks to as far as Horse Guards Parade. He then falls out and does not participate in the trooping itself. The mascot has never been dressed up on parades but there are certain occasions that the wearing of a cape is acceptable. In principle, it is intended that the red linen cape should only be worn by the mascot on State ceremonial occasions. It is worn when tunics are worn and the drum major is wearing State Dress. It may also be worn on special occasions as directed by the 1st Battalion Adjutant or the regimental adjutant. When greatcoats are worn and the drum major wears State Dress, the mascot wears a blue-grey cape. However, the overriding influence is the weather because the animal is never allowed to be distressed by the heat on parade.

The mascots of the Irish Guards from 1902 to present are Brian Boru (1902–1910), Leitrim Boy (1910–1917), Doran (1917–1924), Cruachan (1924–1929), Pat (1951–1953), Shaun (1960–1967), Fionn (1967–1976), Cormac (1976–1985), Connor (1985–1992), Malachy (1992–1994), Cuchulain (1995–2000), Aengus (2000–2003), Donnchadh (2003–2005), Fergal (2006–2007), Conmael (2009–2012), Domhnall (2013–2019) and Turlough Mor (Seamus) (2020–date).

=== The Royal Welsh ===
The Royal Welsh use three Kashmir goats. The name of the mascot for the 1st Battalion (formerly The Royal Welsh Fusiliers) is goat named Billy. The tradition of goat mascots in the military dates from at least 1775. During the American War of Independence in 1775 a wild goat wandered onto a battlefield in Boston, and ended up leading the Welsh regimental colours off the battlefield at the end of the Battle of Bunker Hill. Since then a goat has served with the battalion. In 1884, Queen Victoria presented the regiment, then called the Royal Welch Fusiliers, with a Kashmir goat from her royal herd, and a tradition was started. The British Monarchy has presented an unbroken series of Kashmir goats to the Royal Welch Fusiliers from the Crown's own royal herd. The royal goat herd was originally obtained from Mohammad Shah Qajar, Shah of Persia from 1834 to 1848, when he presented them to Queen Victoria as a gift in 1837 upon her accession to the throne.

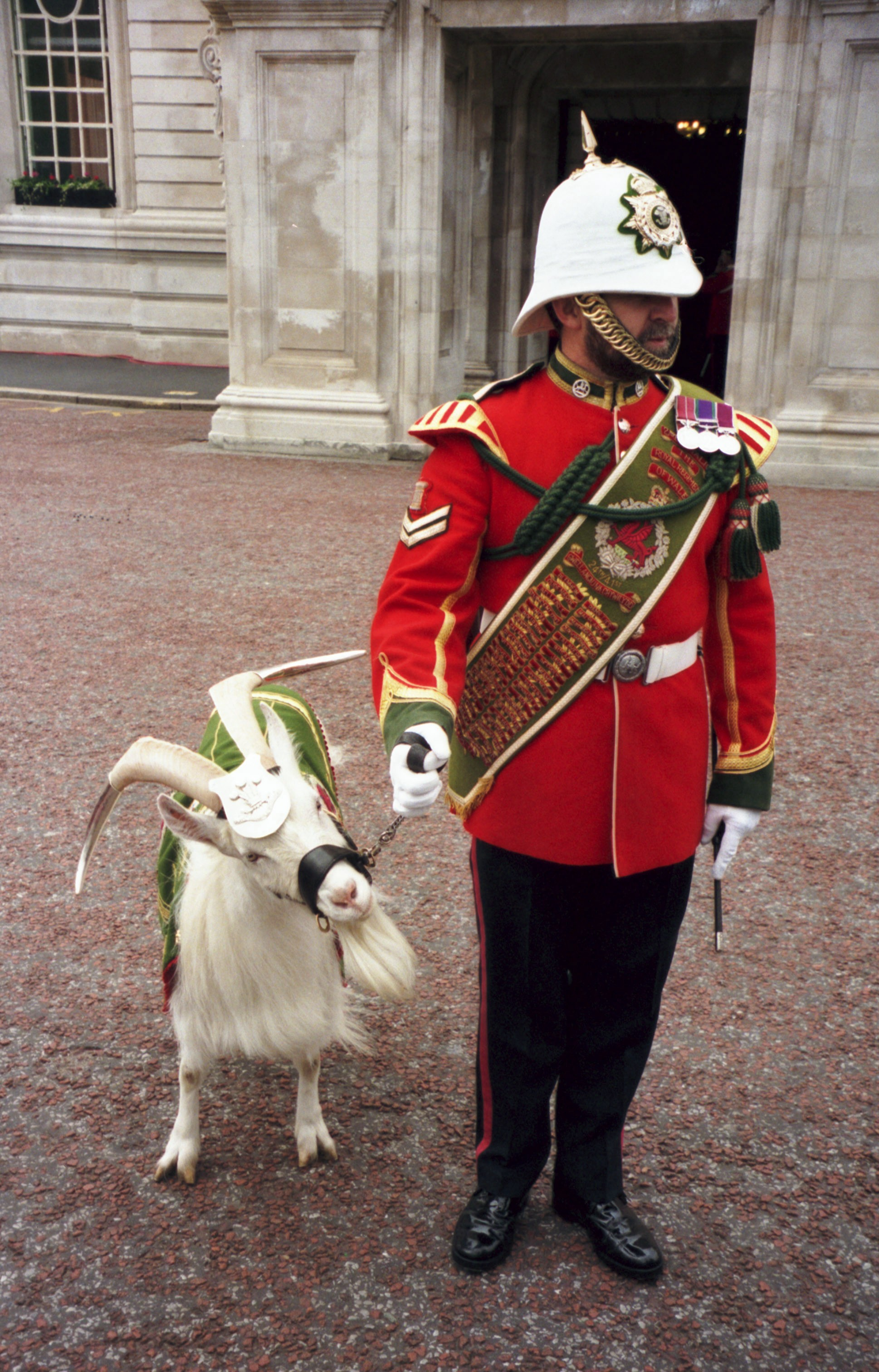
The goat mascot and Goat Major of the Royal Regiment of Wales, 1999.

All the goats are called William (anglicised version of Gwylim) Windsor, or Billy for short. Their primary duty is to march at the head of the battalion on all ceremonial event. The present goat mascot, Fusilier William Windsor, was chosen from a herd of goats living on the Great Orme in Llandudno on 13 June 2009. After his selection, months of work followed to get him used to his fellow soldiers and to make him learn what is expected of him. As the goat progressed, he was taught to get used to sounds and noises coming from marching soldiers.

The predecessor mascot, Lance Corporal William Windsor, a Kashmir goat from the royal herd at Whipsnade Zoo in Bedfordshire, was presented to the regiment by Queen Elizabeth II in 2001. Following eight years of distinguished military service, he retired on 20 May 2009 due to his age. As he left Dale Barracks, Chester for the last time, hundreds of soldiers from the battalion lined the route from his pen to the trailer to say farewell and thank you for his many years of good service. He was led into the trailer by the battalion's Goat Major in full ceremonial dress that included a silver headdress which was a gift from the queen in 1955. He was taken to Whipsnade Zoo, where he is spending his honourable retirement.

The goat is more than a mascot; it is a full member of the battalion and in the days gone by, when it was a 1,000-strong unit, it was 999 men plus the goat. As a soldier, the goat can move up the ranks. It starts as a fusilier and if it is well-behaved and does well on parades, quite often it is promoted to lance corporal, a non-commissioned officer rank. As a full member of the battalion, he is accorded the full status and privileges of the rank.

There are perks to the job of regimental mascot. Billy gets a two-a-day cigarette ration (he eats them, as traditionally, the tobacco is thought to be good for the goat) and Guinness to drink when he is older "to keep the iron up".

The mascot for 2nd Battalion (formerly The Royal Regiment of Wales) is a goat named Taffy. The regimental goat mascot was first mentioned in 1775. It was officially known as "His Majesty's Goat". During the Crimean War in 1855, the story goes that on one particularly cold night, a Private Gwilym Jenkins was on sentry duty. To keep himself warm, he placed a kid goat inside his greatcoat. However, Jenkins fell asleep. Fortunately, goats have very good hearing and the kid goat bleated when it heard movements of the enemy. Pte Jenkins was awakened by the agitated bleating of the kid goat and espied an advancing Russian patrol. He was able to warn the forward picket and the enemy was driven off. From then on, every time the 41st (Welsh) Regiment of Foot, a predecessor of the Royal Regiment of Wales, went into battle, a goat led the way as good luck.

After the Crimean War, a review at Aldershot on 29 July 1856 by Queen Victoria of regiments that had returned from the Crimea was held. One of the regiments present was the 41st (Welsh) Regiment of Foot, which brought along their Russian goat mascot. On that occasion, the queen learned of the goat mascot tradition of the regiment, to which she promised that upon the death of the present mascot, she will replace it with one from the Royal Herd in Great Windsor Park. In 1862, the first official goat from the royal herd at Windsor was presented to the regiment and a tradition was started. The goat is officially recorded on the battalion ration roll as Gwylim Jenkins, but he is called by his nickname, Taffy. He is also officially recorded as the regimental goat.

The present battalion mascot is Taffy V who holds the rank of lance corporal. He lives in Lucknow Barracks in Tidworth, Wiltshire. Replacements for the goat mascot are traditionally selected from the royal herd kept at Whipsnade Zoo in Bedfordshire and are always named Taffy plus a Roman numeral to show succession. The soldier who looks after the goat is known as the Goat Major, who actually has the rank of a corporal.

The mascot for 3rd Battalion (formerly The Royal Welsh Regiment) is a goat named Shenkin. The present battalion mascot is a Kashmir white goat, named Shenkin III, which was selected from Queen Elizabeth II's own herd of Royal Windsor Whites, on the Great Orme in Llandudno, North Wales on 8 September 2009. He is a direct descendant of the original mascot given to the 3rd Royal Welsh Regiment by Queen Victoria after the Crimean War. Shenkin III is residing at the Maindy Barracks in Cardiff.

The predecessor goat mascot, Lance Corporal Shenkin II, died of old age at the Maindy Barracks on 14 July 2009. He has been the battalion mascot since September 1997. Queen Elizabeth II sent her private condolences following Shenkin's death and Buckingham Palace gave permission for the regiment to pick out a successor. Plans were also discussed for a memorial at Maindy Barracks. LCpl Shenkin II first began service at age 18 months and served for the next 12 years. During his long service, Shenkin II met the queen, visited Prince Charles' Gloucestershire home, Highgrove, and had been to 10 Downing Street, where he was tethered in the rear garden. He replaced Shenkin I, who died on the same day that Princess Diana died.

The name Shenkin is the Welsh pronunciation of Jenkins. The first Shenkin was named Sospan before 1994. During the Zulu War, the first known and adopted mascot name was Gwilym Jenkins. It was named by the Royal Welsh Fusilliers for rationing purposes. Because putting a 'GOAT' down for rations would not happen, the name Gwilym was given to the goat in order to obtain his rations. Brecon war museum in South Wales records "Gwilyn Jenkins one Bail of Hay".

=== Mercian Regiment ===
A Swaledale ram named Private Derby as celebrated in the song "The Derby Ram", is used as the mascot for the Mercian Regiment. Private Derby, a Swaledale ram, is the official mascot of the Mercian Regiment. He was the mascot of the Worcestershire and Sherwood Foresters Regiment which inherited Private Derby from a predecessor regiment, the Sherwood Foresters and which in turn inherited him from The 95th Derbyshire Regiment. Private Derby became the mascot of the Mercian Regiment when it was formed on 1 September 2007 with the amalgamation of the Worcestershire and Sherwood Foresters with the Staffordshire and Cheshire regiments. The ram mascot is a central part of the regiment's history and tradition and its association with the home counties of its predecessor regiments. It is a symbol of pride for the regiment and is extremely popular with the public when it makes appearances.

The first Private Derby was adopted as a mascot in 1858 by the 95th (Derbyshire) Regiment of Foot at the siege and capture of Kotah during the Indian Mutiny Campaign (1857–58). The commanding officer whilst on one of his forays within the town, noticed a fine fighting ram tethered in a temple yard. He directed Private Sullivan of the Number 1 Company to take the ram into his possession. The ram was named Private Derby and has marched nearly 3,000 miles with the soldiers of the regiment through central India before it died in 1863. Since then, there has followed a succession of fine rams, each of which has inherited the official title of Private Derby followed by his succession number. The earlier replacement rams were acquired by the regiment from whichever part of the world they were serving in at the time. However, since 1912 it has become the tradition for the Duke of Devonshire to select a Swaledale Ram from his Chatsworth Park flock and present it to the regiment. It is a tradition the Duke is proud to hold, in recognition of the close association between the regiment and the Dukes of Devonshire, whose ancestral seat is in the county of Derbyshire. However, there was a temporary departure from tradition in 1924 when the successor ram, Derby XIV, was presented to the regiment instead by His Highness Sir Umeo Singh Bahador GCB GLSI GCIE The Mohorac of Kotah.

The Army recognizes each Private Derby as a soldier and has his own regimental number and documentation. He has been held on the official strength of the regiment since the first Private Derby. He is paid 3.75 pounds per day. In addition, he is also on the ration strength and draws his own rations like any other soldier. Private Derby even has a leave card and takes an annual holiday at Chatsworth during the mating season. He may even get a promotion if he behaves.

The only record of a medal being presented to a Regimental Mascot was when Private Derby I of the 95th (Derbyshire) Regiment was awarded the Indian Service Medal with a clasp 'Central India' together with the rest of the battalion on parade at Poona in 1862. He also fought 33 battles against other rams and was undefeated.

When on parade, Private Derby wears a coat of scarlet with Lincoln green and gold facings, the whole emblazoned with the regiment's main Battle Honours. Also on his coat is to be found a replica of his India Mutiny Medal. In addition, he now wears the General Service Medal 1962 with the clasp Northern Ireland as he has been stationed there several times over the years. On his forehead is to be found a silver plate suitably embossed with the regimental cap badge. A pair of silver protectors are fitted on the tips of his horns to protect the clothing of persons near him such as his handlers and visitors, of which he receives a great number each time he appears in public.

Private Derby has two handlers from the Drums Platoon whose duty is to look after him at all times. The senior handler is called the "Ram Major" whilst the other one is the "Ram Orderly". They escort Private Derby when he is on parade by standing, one on each side of the sheep and leading or controlling him with two white ornamental ropes that are attached to a leather collar. It is the responsibility of the Ram Major to prepare Private Derby for all parades and the other appearances which he makes.

The predecessor ram, Private Derby XXVIII, died on 10 September 2008 of unknown cause at age four. He died in his residence at the barracks in Chilwell, Nottingham. He started his military service as a mascot in 2005. Private Derby, one of only nine mascots recognized by the Army, represented the regiment on ceremonial duties for the past three years. The year that he died was the 150th anniversary of the ram mascot.

The present mascot, Derby XXIX, was selected by the Duke of Devonshire from his Chatsworth Park estate in Derbyshire in September 2008 and was formally handed over to the regiment during a ceremony at Chatsworth House on 15 January 2009. The head shepherd at Chatsworth House handed over the new Pte Derby to the regimental secretary of the Mercian Regiment. He is now residing at Chetwynd Barracks, Chilwell, Nottinghamshire. He is an excellent ram, both big and strong albeit with a pleasant nature and most importantly, handles well on parade. He was promoted to lance corporal during a Crimean War commemoration ceremony at the Nottingham Castle in April 2011.

=== The Royal Regiment of Fusiliers ===
An Indian Black Buck Antelope named Bobby is used as the mascot for the Royal Regiment of Fusiliers. The tradition of antelope mascots dates back 140 years, when the Royal Warwickshire Regiment, a predecessor regiment, adopted a live antelope as mascot when it was stationed in India in 1871. It was an Indian black buck antelope named Billy which was also the name given to its successors for many years. Subsequently, the names Charlie and Bobby have also been used. The custom stems from the Royal Warwickshire Regiment's 'ancient badge' of an Antelope, authorised to be displayed on colours and appointments in 1747, but traditionally held to date from the regiment's service in Spain during the War of the Spanish Succession. When the four fusilier regiments merged to form the Royal Regiment of Fusiliers, the antelope was adopted as the mascot of the new regiment.

The second Billy was presented to the 1st Battalion, The Royal Warwickshire Regiment about the time of the Delhi Durbar of 1877 by a well-known Maharajah. It came home with the battalion in 1880 and died in Ireland in 1888. There were two sources of supply of these animals, the battalion serving in India usually received them as gifts from the Maharajahs, while the home battalion was given theirs by the London Zoo.

In 1963, the Royal Warwickshire Regiment was converted to a fusilier regiment. Then on 23 April 1968 the Royal Warwickshire Fusiliers was amalgamated with three other fusilier regiments to form the Royal Regiment of Fusiliers, where the tradition of antelope mascot was carried on.

Two men are chosen from amongst the battalion drummers to be in charge of the antelope, a buck leader and an assistant buck leader. When on parade, these two men hold the white cords attached to the buck's white collar which have a large silver badge on it. On the antelope's back is a coat of royal blue on which is emblazoned the regimental badge. The horns are tipped with silver cones.

Though amenable to discipline, the antelopes have been known to have a mind of their own. At a military review in Aldershot, the then mascot, Bobby II, chose to lie down as he was being led past King George V and proceeded to nibble the grass, thus halting the parade. On another occasion, the drum-major made the mistake of walking in front of the mascot at a Tattoo performance, and paid for his error with a sore behind and ripped trousers. Bobby III who was a corporal proved to be more cunning. On a church parade at Tidworth, he developed a limp. At first, he would be removed from the parade and returned to his pen where he would quickly recover. After three Sundays of limping and quick recovery, it was decided to ignore him and press on. After a quarter of a mile, the limp stopped and never re-occurred.

One of the antelope mascots in the long line of successors all named Bobby was recognized at the Tower of London on 24 June 1997 with a Long Service and Good Conduct Medal for fifteen years of loyal service to the Royal Regiment of Fusiliers. This Bobby was born at the London Zoo in 1982 and joined the regiment at the age of one month. Normal life expectancy for antelopes is about nine years but Bobby has butted his way to fifteen. He was promoted corporal on his 13th birthday. He normally lives in Coventry with one of the Fusiliers' Territorial Army battalions but came to London for the presentation outside the Fusiliers' regimental headquarters in the Tower.

The antelope mascot in the year 2000 also named Bobby was sent to the Tower of London, the Fusiliers' regimental headquarters when the 2nd Battalion went on a tour of Germany. His stay there was extended when foot-and-mouth disease restrictions prevented him from returning to the 2nd Battalion's barracks. He was due to return to the battalion's barracks in April 2001 but stayed in the Tower of London for 15 months.

The present mascot is named Bobby and holds the rank of corporal. He attends all major parades held by the regiment. He lives with the 2nd Battalion, The Royal Regiment of Fusiliers in St. George Barracks, North Luffenham, Ruthland in Leicestershire. His pen is a converted tennis court with plenty of grass to graze. His regular diet is horse nuts and is partial to biscuits. He likes hour-long walks.

The Fusiliers also have a British Otterhound as their stand-by regimental mascot because its regular mascot, an Indian black buck, is an endangered species. Should the present Indian black buck mascot die or retire, replacing it with another Indian black buck will be difficult.

=== 3rd Battalion The Mercian Regiment (Staffords) ===
A Staffordshire Bull Terrier named Watchman is used as the mascot for the 3rd Battalion The Mercian Regiment. The mascot tradition in the regiments of Staffordshire stretches back to the 19th Century. In 1882, the South Staffordshire Regiment was ordered to march with Lord Wolseley to relieve General Gordon who was besieged in Khartoum. They entrained at Cairo with their Staffordshire Bull Terrier named Boxer. Startled by the sudden noise of the train's engine when it departed, Boxer leapt from the moving train and was seen lying, either unconscious or dead, at the side of the railroad tracks. A few days later, when the regiment encamped at Assiut awaiting orders for the final phase of their march, a very thin and bedraggled dog staggered into their camp and collapsed. It was Boxer, who like a true soldier, walked for over 200 miles along the railway tracks in the scorching desert to rejoin his regiment. This feat marked the start of the tradition of having a Bull Terrier as a regimental mascot.

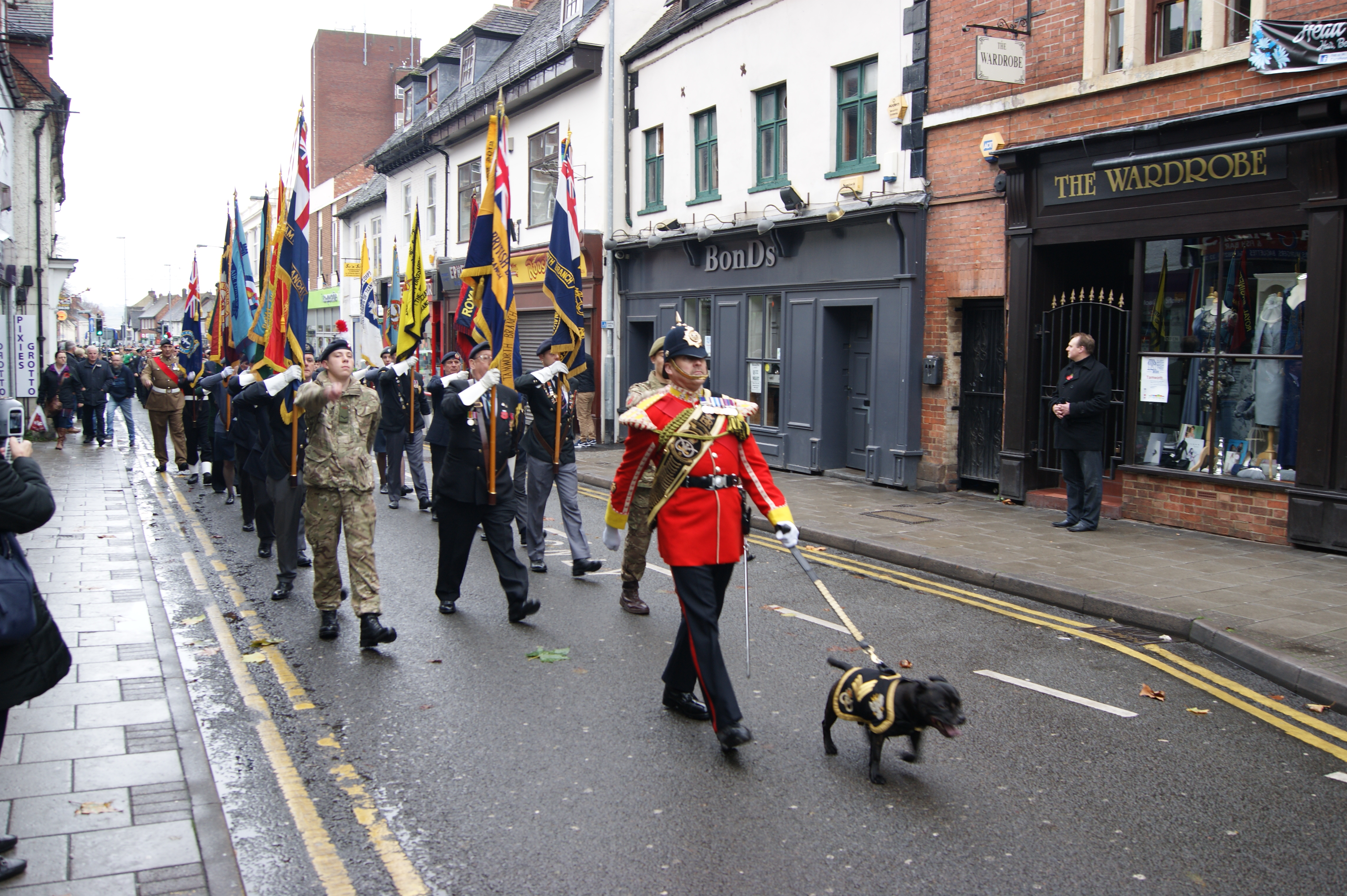
Watchman on parade in Tamworth, Staffordshire, as part of the 2015 Remembrance Day events.

In 1949, after years of being the best battalion in recruitment of new soldiers in the Territorial Army, the 6th Battalion North Staffordshire Regiment was presented with a pure white Staffordshire Bull Terrier. The battalion adopted the bull terrier as their mascot and named it Watchman I. On 25 May 1949, the 6th North Staffords sent a Company-size group (some 120 men) along with its mascot and Corps of Drums and Fifes to the Royal Tournament, which was held that year in Olympia. Watchman I showed little interest in the occasion until the Band and Drums struck up. At which point, he raised his head and marched proudly to the thunderous applause of an appreciative audience which had immediately taken him to their heart. Over the next decade, Watchman I participated in every parade the battalion took part. He was presented to Queen Elizabeth II on her visit to Burton-on-Trent on 28 March 1957. Watchman I died in 1959 and was laid to rest in the lawn opposite the Town Hall in King Edward Place in Burton-upon-Trent.

Such was the tradition, interest and good feeling of the people of Burton towards this mascot that in September 1960 Watchman II was presented to the battalion by the town at a civic parade. Like his predecessor, he was to march at the head of the battalion throughout the next six years of his life. He was presented to Queen Elizabeth II on the occasion of the Presentation of New Colours to the 6th North Staffords at Molineaux in the early 1960s. His last parade was the Honorary Colonels Parade held at St Martins Camp in 1966. The following year the County TA Regiments were reformed and Watchman II went into retirement until his death in 1974, at the age of fourteen. He was buried alongside his predecessor Watchman I.

The tradition started up again in 1988 in the 3rd (V) Battalion The Staffordshire Regiment. It was felt that the time-honoured tradition of having a mascot should continue. Consequently, a search was made to find a dog with a suitable pedigree and bearing to do justice to the Battalion and County. As an indication of the depth of feeling within the county for the mascot, the people of Burton presented the battalion with Watchman III in 1988. He reached the rank of sergeant and served until his death in 1998. He was interred alongside his two predecessors. In 2006, special memorials were unveiled in the town for the three former mascots.

The successor mascot, Watchman IV, was presented to the Staffordshire Regiment as a puppy in August 1998 by the Friends of the Regiment. He has been the mascot since 1999 and has reached the rank of Colour Sergeant, which is equal in status to his handler.

Watchman IV not only paraded with the Staffordshire Regiment but also with the newly formed West Midlands Regiment. He has appeared at remembrance day parades in London and once at a remembrance service outside Westminster Abbey where he met Queen Elizabeth II. He again met the queen when Stafford celebrated its 800th anniversary in 2006. He participated in the Tercentenary Celebration in 2005. Watchman attracts attention such as when his handler took him for a walk through the streets of London. A coach full of tourists pulled up and leapt off the vehicle to photograph him.

Watchman IV was carried forward when the battalion joined the Mercian Regiment on 1 September 2007 and became the mascot of the 3rd Battalion The Mercian Regiment. He retired on 4 October 2009 after 10 years of military service. He was replaced by a young Staffordshire Bull Terrier named Watchman V, in a ceremony at the battalion's museum in Whittington on 5 October 2010.

The present mascot is linked to 4 Mercian (V) and the Staffordshire Regimental Association, but lives at the home of the soldier who looks after him. He was made a lance corporal at a ceremony at the National Brewery Museum in Burton-upon-Trent on 8 September 2011. He was promoted to corporal at the Staffordshire Regiment Museum in 2013. He was promoted to sergeant in 2015, forming a central part of Tamworth's St George's Day celebrations in the grounds of Tamworth Castle.

Watchman is classified as a regimental pet as he is not recognised by the Army. Since he is an unofficial battalion mascot, his upkeep is paid for by the Staffordshire Regimental Association, not by the government. Following the removal of 3rd Battalion (the Stafford's) from the Mercian Regiment, Watchman now marches with the Staffordshire Regimental Association.

=== 1st Battalion The Yorkshire Regiment (Prince of Wales's Own) ===
Two Ferrets named Imphal and Quebec are used as the mascots for the 1st Battalion of the Yorkshire Regiment. The locals presented two ferrets to the 1st Battalion The Yorkshire Regiment when it was on duty in Northern Ireland. They were adopted as regimental pets and named after the battalion's battle honours, Imphal and Quebec. These ferrets are classified as regimental pets since they are not recognized by the Army. They are unofficial battalion mascots.

== United States ==
=== United States Army mascots ===
There are several unofficial mascots in the United States Army, but only three official mascots. A donkey, Big Deuce VIII, and a Boer goat, Short Round VII, represent 2nd Battalion, 2nd Field Artillery at Fort Sill; three mules represent the United States Military Academy; and a borzoi (previously called the "Russian wolfhound"), Kolchak XVI, represents the 27th Infantry Regiment "Wolfhounds" at Schofield Barracks, referencing the unit's deployment to Siberia in 1918 during the Russian Civil War.

=== United States Marine Corps mascots ===
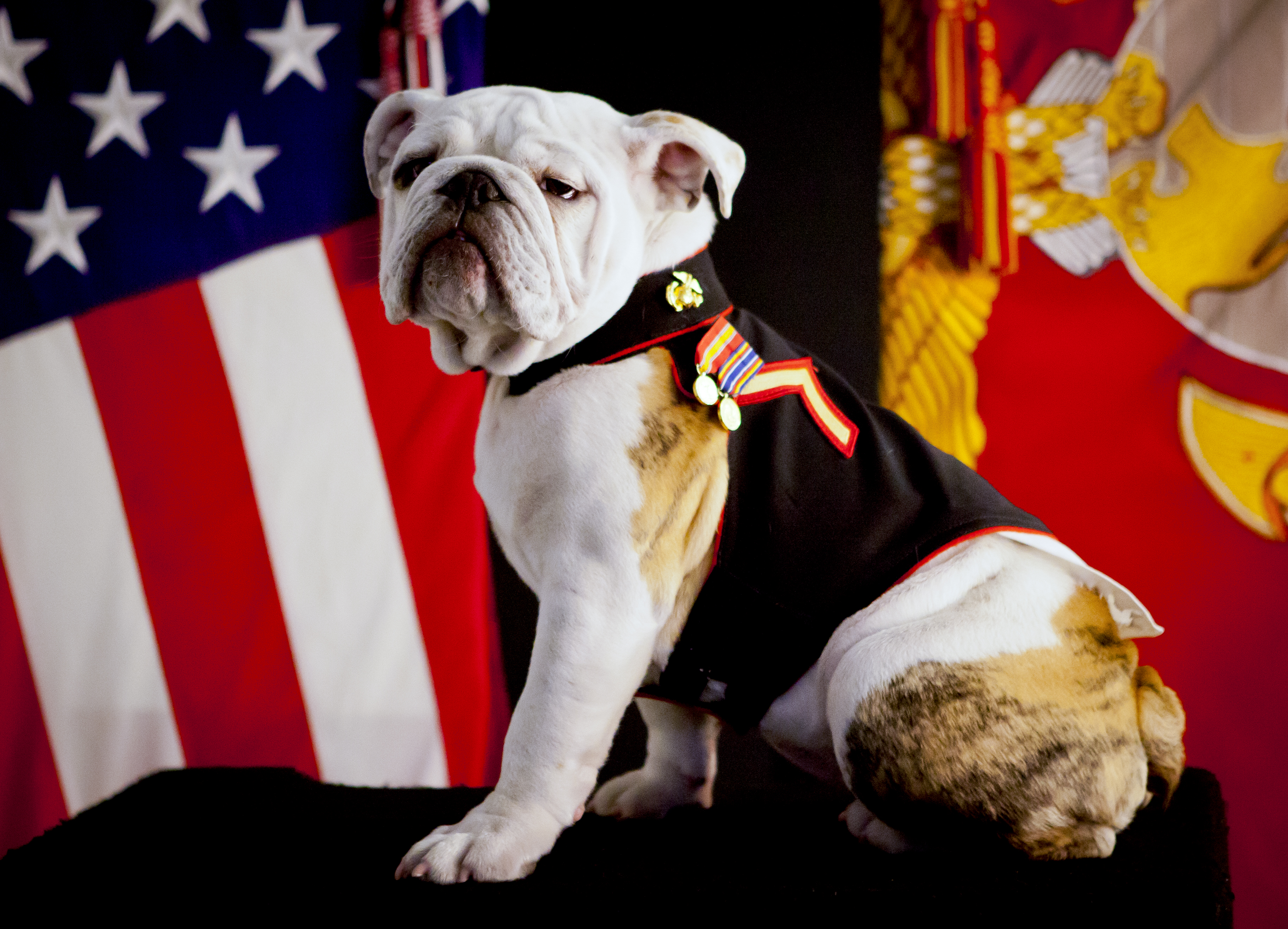
PFC Chesty the XIV, the mascot of the United States Marine Corps

Since 1922, the United States Marine Corps has used bulldogs as its mascots. U.S. Marine Maj. Gen. Smedley Butler introduced the first Marine bulldog mascot, Pvt. Jiggs, who lived at Marine Barracks, Quantico. He quickly rose in the ranks to sergeant major. He was the first in a series of bulldog mascots (the more famous Jiggs II being the second). The current mascot is the 16th in a series of mascots named "Chesty" in honor of famed Marine Lieutenant General Lewis B. "Chesty" Puller Jr. This dog lives at the Marine Barracks, Washington, D.C., where he appears in weekly parades.

Several Marine units also have mascots, usually bulldogs, the most famous of which represent the enlisted training installations: an English bulldog named Legend represents Marine Corps Recruit Depot Parris Island and LCpl. Belleau Wood represents Marine Corps Recruit Depot San Diego.

=== United States Navy mascots ===
Several ships in the United States Navy have kept animals as mascots, largely evolved from the historical practice of keeping animals aboard such as ship's cats. Seaman Jenna, an orphaned Shiba Inu, was the canine mascot of the USS Vandegrift (FFG-48) while the ship was forward deployed to the Seventh Fleet between 1998 and 2003. The USS Lake Erie (CG-70) also had an American Pygmy named Master Chief Charlie serve as an unofficial mascot from 2012 to 2015, when the ship was stopped for violating California's animal transportation regulations while entering San Diego, leading to the ship's captain being removed from his command post and Carrier Strike Group 11 officially prohibiting animal mascots. Master Chief Charlie was ultimately transferred to the care of a San Diego-area farmer.

Bill the Goat, a billy goat, is the mascot of the United States Naval Academy.

== Ukraine ==
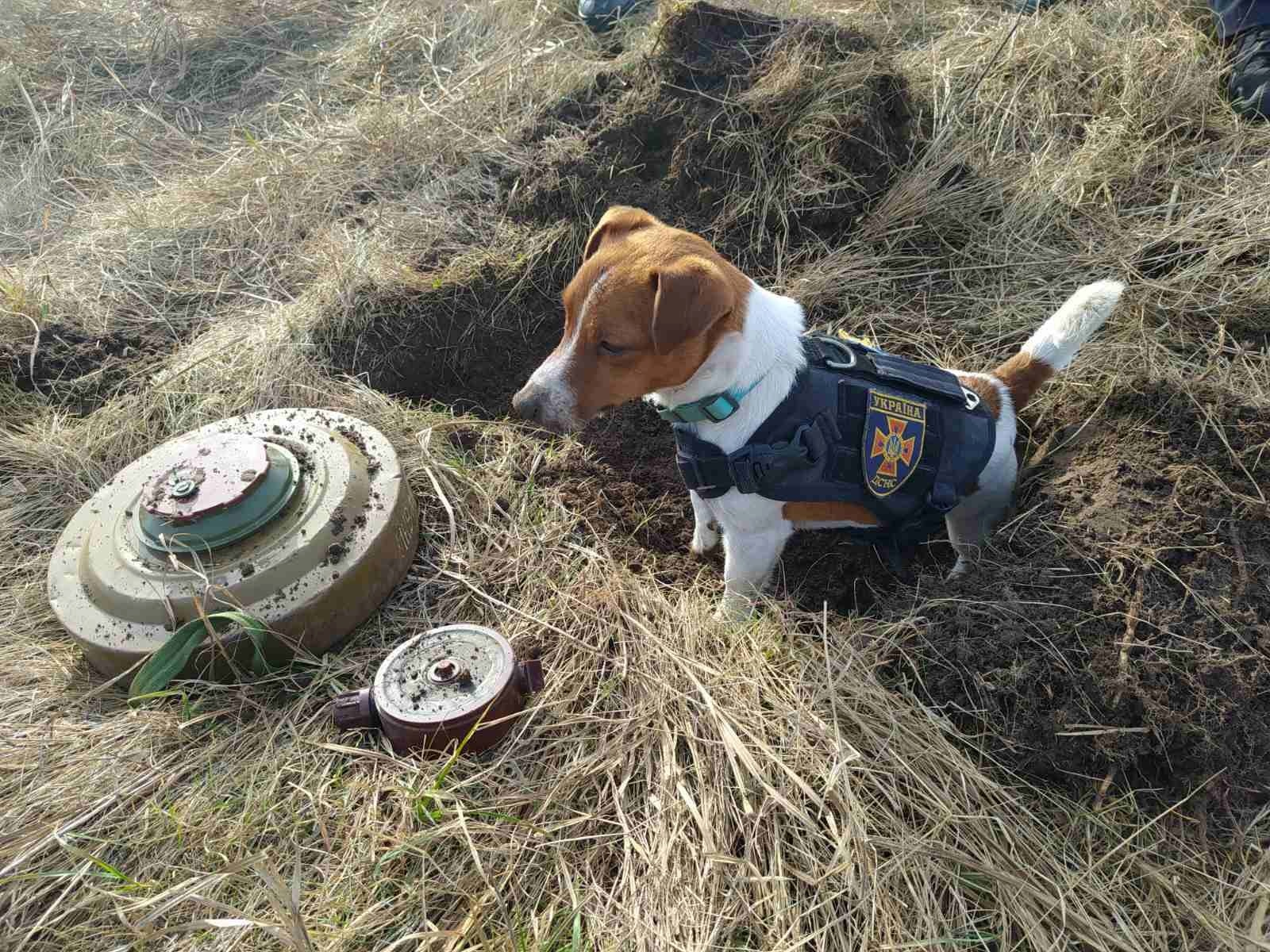
Patron next to two defused Russian land mines

Patron is a detection dog that serves as the mascot of the State Emergency Service of Ukraine. A Jack Russell Terrier born in 2019, Patron became famous following the 2022 Russian invasion of Ukraine after the State Emergency Service video of him examining debris and explosives went viral. Patron has since been the subject of Ukrainian wartime propaganda and has received numerous honorary awards and designations, including the Order for Courage, Third Class by Volodymyr Zelenskyy in May 2022 and the Palm Dog Award at the 2022 Cannes Film Festival.

== See also ==
- Bamse
- Boy
- Douglas the camel
- Horrie the Wog Dog
- Just Nuisance
- Simon, Ship's cat of HMS Amethyst
- K9C Sinbad, USCG
- Old Abe
- Rags
- Reveille
- Ship's cats in military ships
- Sir Nils Olav
- Timothy
- Tirpitz
- Unsinkable Sam
- William Windsor (goat)
- Winnipeg the Bear
- Wojtek
