= Emry =

Emry is both a surname and a given name. Notable people with the name include:

- Elizabeth Emry (1923–1995), American baseball player
- L. K. Emry (1911–1992), American politician and labor leader from Nebraska
- Shea Emry (born 1986), Canadian football player
- Emry Arthur (1902–1967), American musician
- Emry Pere (born 1998), New Zealand rugby league footballer

== See also ==
- Emrys, a masculine Welsh given name
- EMRY
