= Chesty =

Chesty may refer to:

== People ==
=== Nickname ===
- Chet Johnson (1917–1983), Major League Baseball pitcher
- George W. McClusky (1861–1912), American law enforcement officer and police inspector
- Chesty Puller (1898–1971), United States Marine Corps officer
- Joie Ray (runner) (1894–1978), American track and field athlete

=== Stage name ===
- Chesty Morgan, Polish-born retired exotic dancer Ilana Wajc (born 1937)

== Other ==
- Chesty (mascot), the lineage of mascots for the United States Marine Corps (since 1957)

== Fictional characters ==
- The protagonist of Chesty Anderson, USN, a 1976 R-rated comedy film featuring Shari Eubank
- Chesty, from the American animated short-lived television series Pandamonium
- Chesty Barlow, from the 1937 British drama film Cross My Heart
- Chesty Bond, long-lived fictional cartoon character and trademark for the Australian clothing company Bonds
- Chesty Burrage, from the 1935 American feature film Stolen Harmony
- Chesty Miller, from the 1940 American adventure film Emergency Squad
- Chesty Miller, from the 1960 gangster film The Music Box Kid
- "Chesty" Morgan, from the 1926 American romance film The Shamrock Handicap
- "Chesty" O'Connor, from the 1934 American romantic comedy film Here Comes the Navy
- Chesty Sanchez, comic book superheroine created by Steve Ross
- Chesty Smith, from the 1992 American sports-drama film School Ties
- Chesty Webb, from the 1938 American comedy film Battle of Broadway

== Other uses ==
- Chesty: A Tribute to a Legend, a documentary about Chesty Puller directed by John Ford
- Chesty (mascot), the unofficial Bulldog mascot of the United States Marine Corps, named after Chesty Puller
