= Westacott =

Westacott is a surname. Notable people with the surname include:

- Dai Westacott (1882-1917), Welsh international rugby union player;
- Emily Hood Westacott (1910–1980), Australian tennis player;
- Emrys Westacott (born 1956), American philosopher;
- Jennifer Westacott, Australian business executive;
- John Westacott (born 1933), Australian rules footballer.
