= Goat of the Spanish Legion =

Traditional mascot of the Spanish Legion

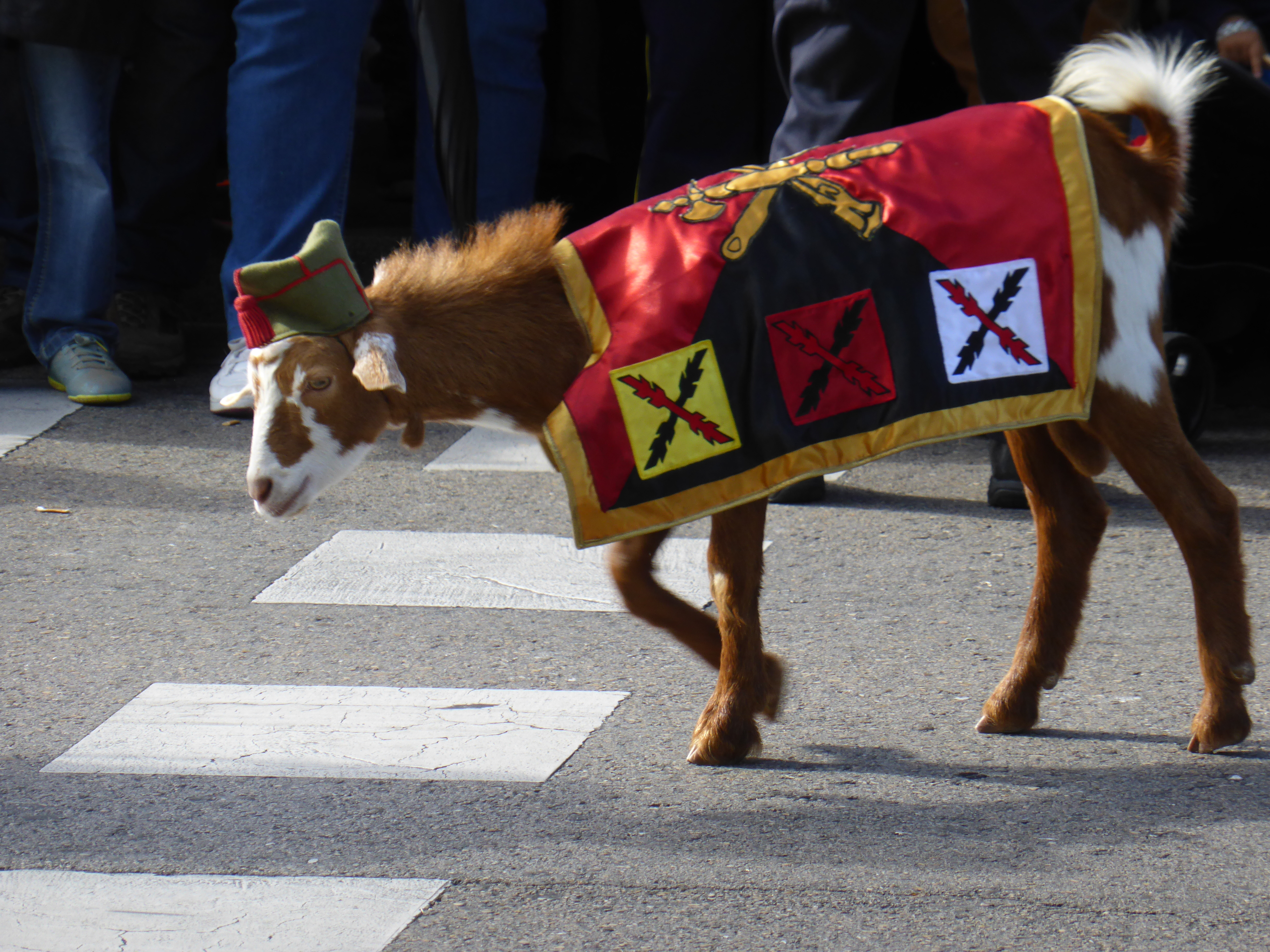
- The mascot before a parade in 2015.
- Other name: Cabra de la Legión Española
- Species: Goat
- Notable role: Participating in military parades for the Spanish Legion
- Owner: Spanish Legion

The Goat of the Spanish Legion (Spanish: Cabra de la Legión Española) is the traditional mascot of the Spanish Legion military corps. A representative of the species usually accompanies the legionaries in military parades. It is usually dressed in a ceremonial garment, either a cloak bearing a military emblem or, occasionally, a side cap or hat. The goat is usually formally given the name "Carlos V", although it is commonly nicknamed "Manoli" (a diminutive of "Manuela").

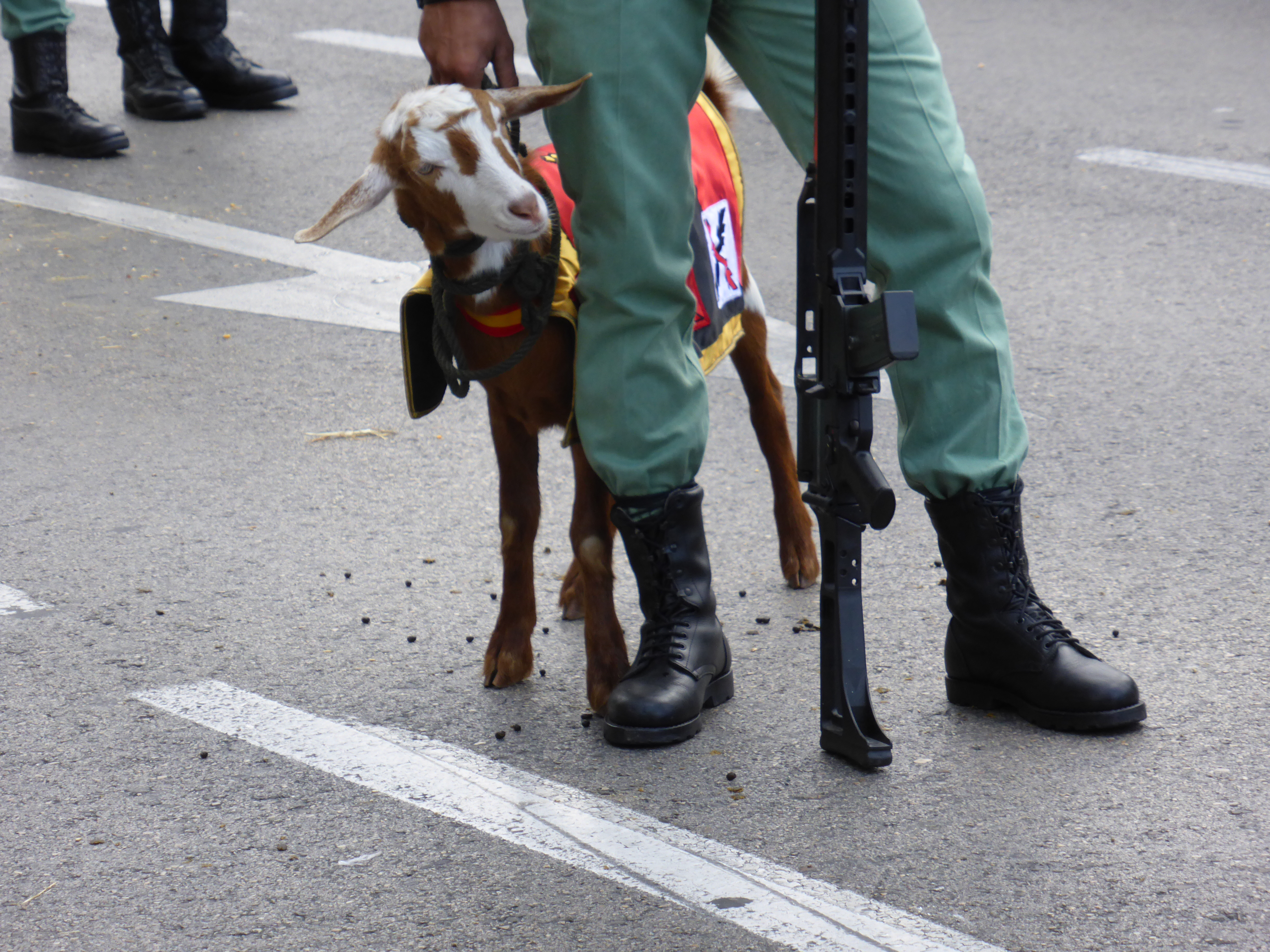
The Goat of the Spanish Legion waits to march in a parade for the National Day of Spain in Madrid. This mascot from 2015 was a one-year-old female of the species.

Although the goat was eventually popularized as the representative of the Spanish Legion, the force has had other animal mascots. First, it had monkeys originating from Ceuta, followed by Barbary apes from Gibraltar, Barbary sheep, bears, and even parrots trained to say profanities. Recent parades have also sometimes featured a ram, whose horns are occasionally painted gold.
