= Boy (dog) =

17th-century English Royalist army dog

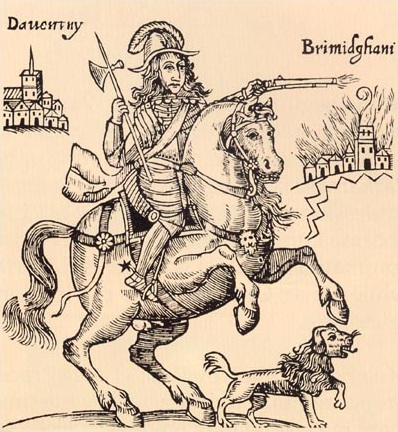
- Boy and Prince Rupert of the Rhine in a pro-Parliamentary woodcut condemning the pair
- Species: Canis familiaris
- Breed: Poodle
- Sex: Male
- Born: c. 1638
- Died: 2 July 1644; Marston Moor, Kingdom of England
- Resting place: Marston Moor, England
- Occupation: Hunting dog and military mascot
- Years active: 1640–1644
- Known for: Iconic Royalist symbol during English Civil War
- Owner: Prince Rupert of the Rhine

Boy (also Boye, Puddle, or Pudel) was a white hunting poodle belonging to Royalist commander Prince Rupert of the Rhine during the English Civil War. Parliamentarian propaganda alleged that the dog was "endowed" with magical powers.

Boy accompanied his master into battle and was killed at the Battle of Marston Moor on 2 July 1644.

== Origins ==
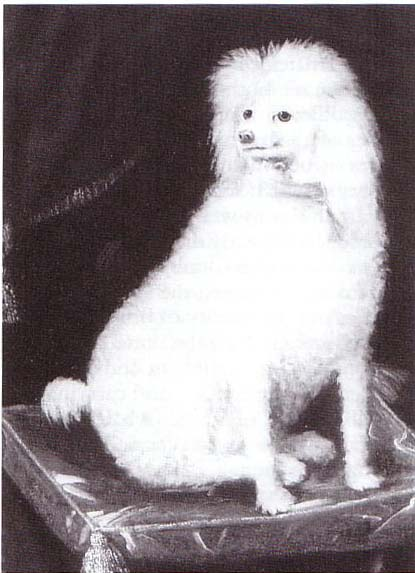
In Royalist parodies, Boy was said to be a 'Lapland Lady' who had been transformed into a white dog.

Boy was first given to Prince Rupert when he was imprisoned in the fortress of Linz during the Thirty Years' War. The Earl of Arundel, an Englishman who had grown concerned about Rupert's plight, gave him the animal to keep him company during his confinement. The dog was a rare breed of white hunting poodle.

There were probably two poodles, one black and one white, given to Rupert in Germany. The black was lost early on in the war; it was the white survivor who became notorious. It was sometimes called "Puddle" (for "poodle"), but its most famous name was "Boy", although it might have been female. Propaganda was put about that Boy had possession of dark powers as a 'dog-witch'.

Boy was sufficiently impressive and famous across Europe that the Ottoman Sultan of the day, Murad IV, requested that his ambassador attempt to find him a similar animal. Boy accompanied Rupert during his travels until 1644.

== Propaganda and magical powers ==
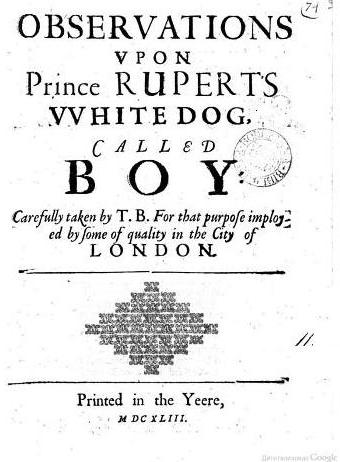
Pro-Parliamentary pamphlet of 1643

Boy accompanied his master from 1642 to 1644 during the English Civil War.

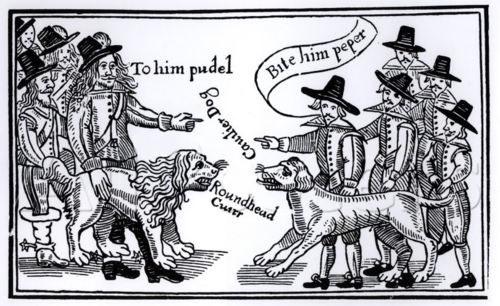
Royalist pamphlet of 1643 depicting "Pudel" (probably Boy) facing off against a Parliamentarian's dog

Rupert was the iconic Royalist cavalier of the conflict and was frequently the subject of Parliamentarian propaganda. Boy, who often accompanied Rupert into battle, featured heavily in this, and was widely suspected of being a witch's familiar. There were numerous accounts of Boy's abilities; some suggested that he was the Devil in disguise.

John Cleveland and other Royalist satirists and parodists mocked these Parliamentarian attitudes and produced lampoons that satirised the alleged "superstition" and "credulity" of their opponents; Cleveland claimed that Boy was Prince Rupert's shapeshifting familiar, and of demonic origins. Other satirists suggested that Boy was a "Lapland Lady" who had been transformed into a white dog. Boy was also "able" to find hidden treasure, was invulnerable to attack, could catch bullets fired at Rupert in his mouth, and prophesy as well as the 16th-century soothsayer, Mother Shipton. Royalist soldiers also promoted Boy, as their adopted mascot, to the rank of Sergeant-Major-General.

Reportedly, Boy had other endearing attributes, such as cocking his leg when he heard the name of John Pym, leader of the Parliamentarian forces. He was also alleged to have performed for Charles I, slept in Prince Rupert's bed, and played with Princes Charles, James, Harry and Princess Henrietta, and was often fed roast beef and capon breast by Charles I himself.

== Death ==
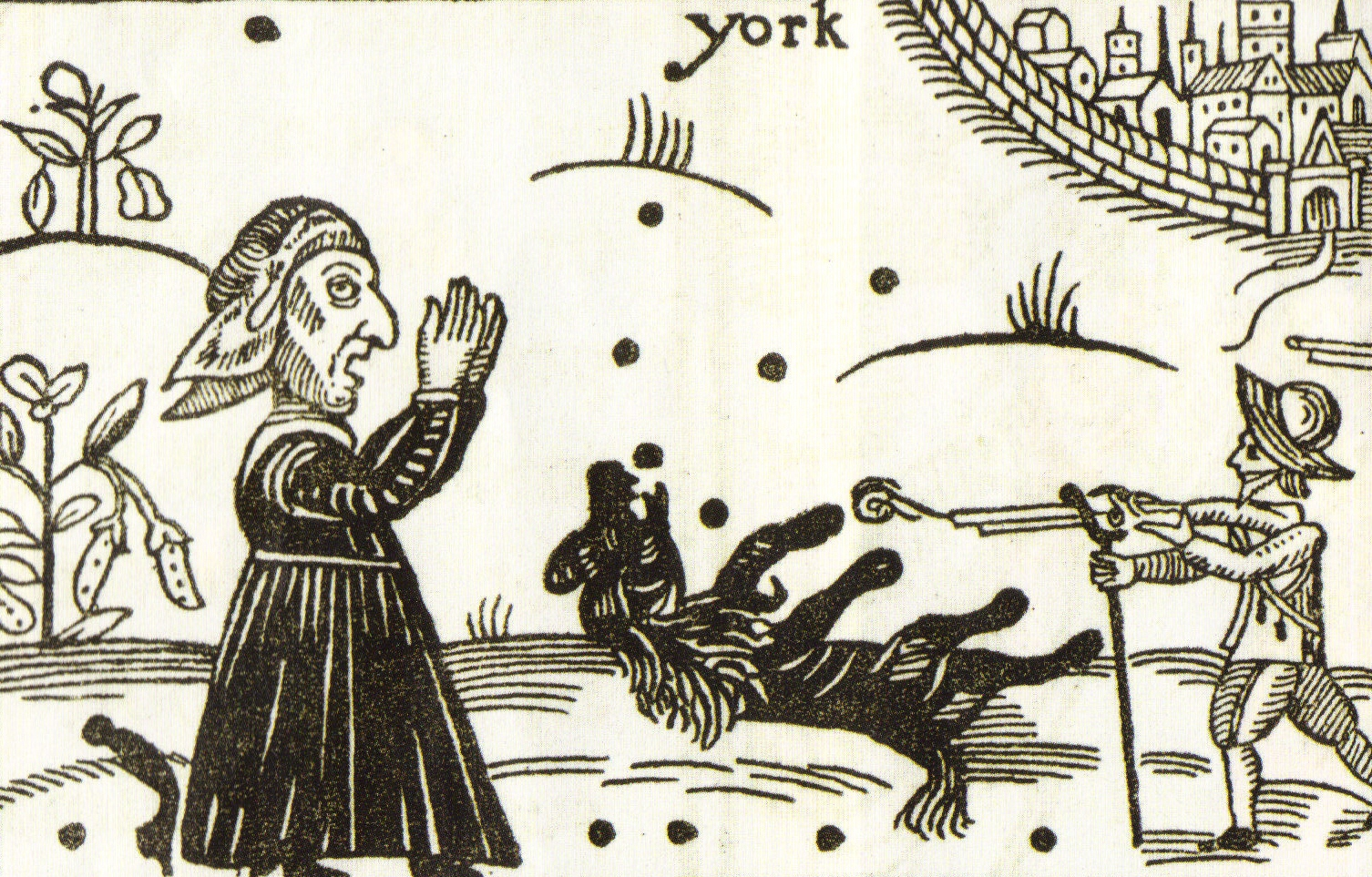
A contemporary depiction of Boy's death

Boy died during the Battle of Marston Moor in 1644. He had been left safely tied up in the Royalist camp, but escaped and chased after Rupert. The battle went badly for the Royalists, and Rupert was forced to flee the field; Boy was killed during the ensuing fighting. He was prominently depicted in woodcut scenes drawn of the battle at the time, lying upside down, dead; Simon Ash, a contemporary historian of the event, drew specific attention to the death of this 'much spoken of' dog.

== Legacy ==
Boy has been recorded as the first official British Army Dog.

John Beattie and his wife Patricia, wrote a children's book, Witch Dog about Prince Rupert and Boy which was published in 1968.

== Contemporary works about Boy ==
- Observations Upon Prince Rupert's White Dog called Boy (Anonymous, 1642)
- A Dialogue, or Rather a Parley, between Prince Rupert's Dog whose name is Puddle and Tobies Dog, whose name is Pepper (Anonymous, 1643)
- The Parliament's Unspotted Bitch (Anonymous, 1643)
- The Parliament's Unspotted Bitch (Cover – Anonymous, 1643)
- A Dog's Elegy: Elegy of Prince Rupert's Tears for the Late Defeat at Marston Moor where his Beloved Dog named Boy was killed by a Valiant Soldier (Anonymous, 1644)

== See also ==
- List of individual dogs

== Bibliography ==
- Bence-Jones, Mark. (1976) The Cavaliers. London: Constable.
- Gaunt, Peter. (2003) The English Civil Wars 1642-1651. Osprey Publishing.
- Levack, Brian P. (ed) (2001) New Perspectives on Witchcraft, Magic, and Demonology: Witchcraft in the British Isles and New England. London: Routledge.
- Purkiss, Diane. (2001) Desire and Its Deformities: Fantasies of Witchcraft in the English Civil War. in Levack (ed) (2001).
- Purkiss, Diane. (2007) The English Civil War: A People's History. London: Harper.
- Spencer, Charles. (2007) Prince Rupert: The Last Cavalier. London: Phoenix.
- Stoyle, Mark. (2011) "The Prince and the Devil Dog," BBC History 12: 5. pp. 22–26.
- Wedgwood, C. V. (1970) The King's War: 1641-1647. London: Fontana.
