= Jiggs II =

Bulldog who served as the mascot of the United States Marine Corp

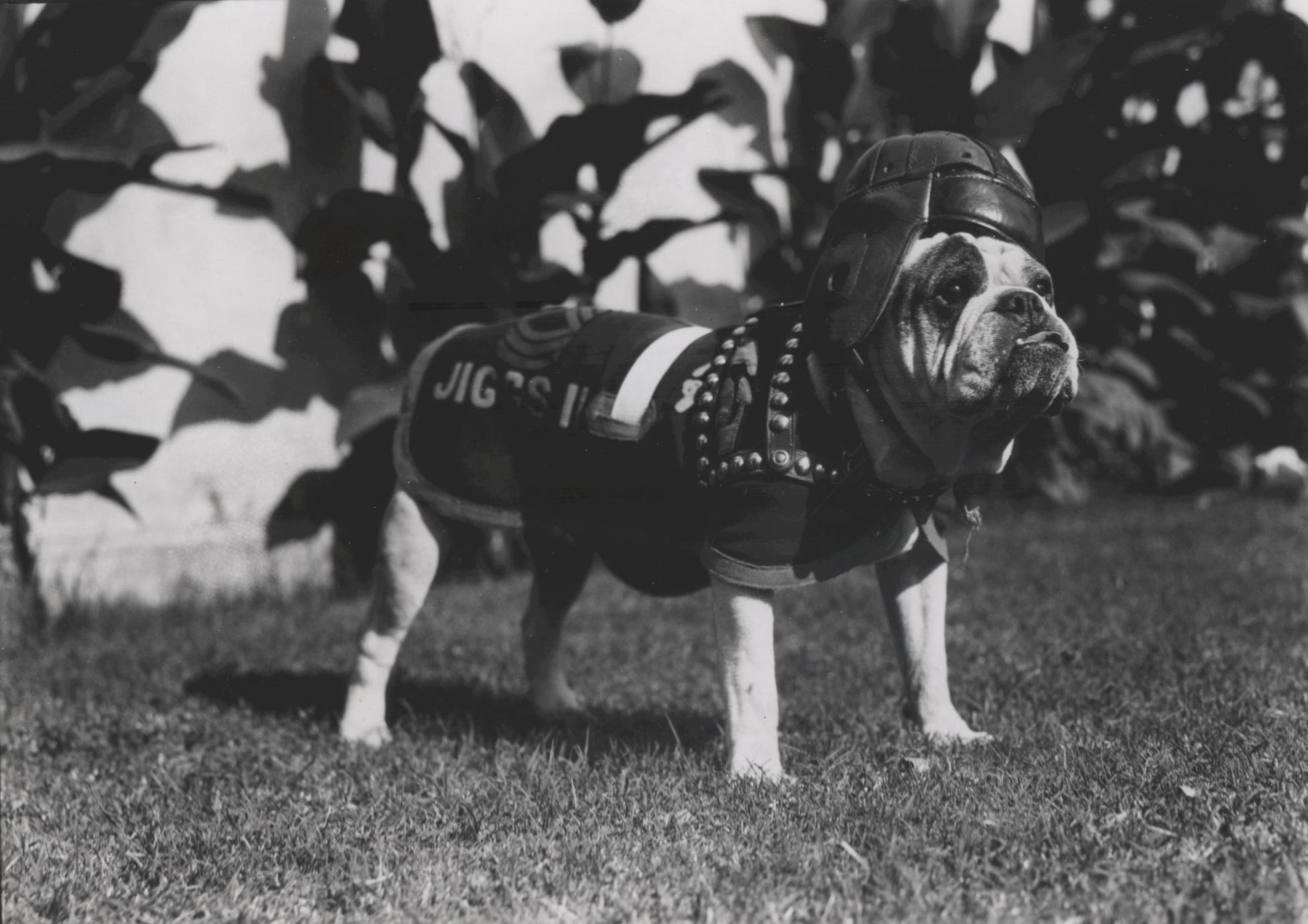
- Jiggs II pictured in 1928
- Other name: Silent White Richard
- Species: Canis lupus familiaris
- Breed: English Bulldog
- Sex: Male
- Born: September 22, 1925
- Died: March 30, 1937
- Resting place: Marine Corps Base Quantico
- Nationality: United States of America
- Occupation: Mascot
- Employer: United States Marine Corps
- Title: Sergeant Major (from 1937)
- Predecessor: Jiggs I
- Successor: Smedley
- Parent: Silent White Duke
- Weight: 47 lb (21 kg)
- Height: 15 in (38 cm)
- Appearance: White with brindle markings
- Awards: Blue Ribbon (1926 Westminster Dog Show); Honorary Champion (1930 Westminster Dog Show)

Jiggs II (September 22, 1925 – March 30, 1937), also known as Silent White Richard, was the second of a number of English Bulldogs to serve as mascots of the United States Marine Corps. He succeeded the original mascot, Jiggs, following that dog's death in 1927. A champion of the Westminster Dog Show, Jiggs II was a generally well-behaved dog with a sensitive disposition – a contrast to his disagreeable friend Private Pagett. He served as Marine Corps mascot for ten years and, after death, was buried with full military honors at Marine Corps Base Quantico.

== Early life and family ==
Jiggs II was whelped in Huntington, New York, as Silent White Richard, the son of the champion show dog Silent White Duke, his father described by the Boston Globe as "one of the best-blooded English Bulldogs in America". (Note: Following death, Silent White Duke's body was donated to the American Museum of Natural History.) He was almost entirely white with brindle markings on his face and tail.

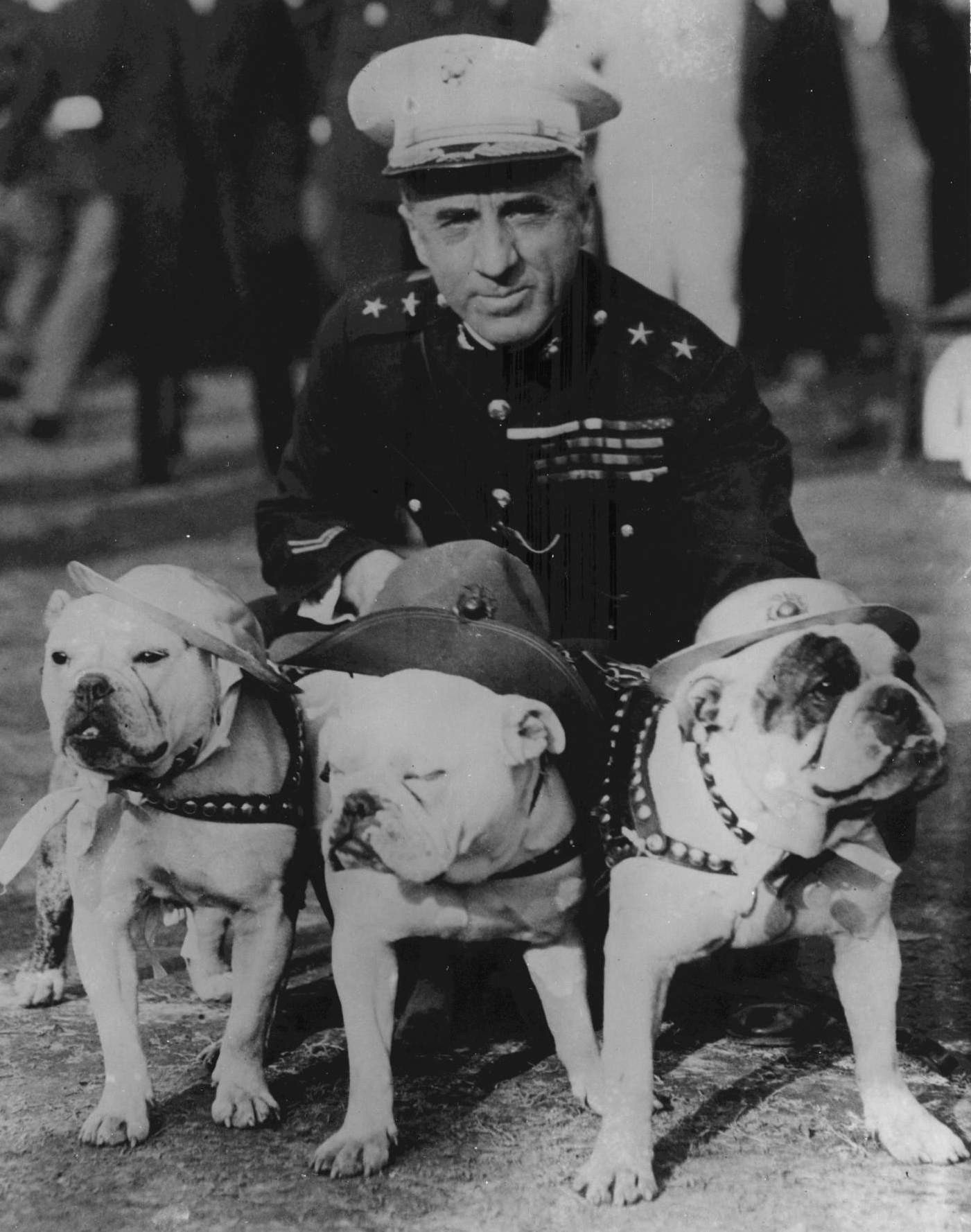
Jiggs II (foreground right) pictured with Smedley Butler, Bill, and Sergeant Thunder, in 1930.

== Career ==
Silent White Richard won a blue ribbon at the 1926 Westminster Dog Show.

The following year, he was presented to the United States Marine Corps by his owner, heavyweight boxing champion Gene Tunney – himself a former Marine – after Tunney learned of the death of Marine mascot Jiggs in January of that year. He was formally accepted by the Marine Corps on March 27, 1927, and renamed Jiggs II. At the time of his donation, Jiggs II was 17 months old, stood 15 inches (380 mm) high, and weighed 47 pounds (21 kg).

Some months after Tunney donated Jiggs II, the dog was temporarily transferred back to the boxer to serve as mascot at his Chicago training camp before being returned to Marine service.

In 1930, Jiggs II made another appearance at the Westminster Dog Show as a non-competing guest. He was named by the show "Honorary Champion".

During his career Jiggs II was posted to Marine Barracks Washington, Marine Corps Base Quantico, and Marine Corps Recruit Depot Parris Island. Notionally enlisted as a private, he was advanced to sergeant major in 1937. He briefly served alongside Private Pagett (registered in pedigree under the name Pride of Field), an English Bulldog donated by the Corps of Royal Marines to the U.S. Marine Corps in 1927. Private Pagett, who was known to have an unpleasant disposition and was prone to biting and chasing, died in 1928 due to heat exhaustion.

== Personal life ==
Early in his military career, the Boston Globe described Jiggs II as "ferocious looking" but with a "mild manner and gentle disposition". Writing in a 1937 issue of American Kennel Gazette, then retired Sergeant Major Clarance Proctor affirmed this description of Jiggs II. Tunney himself described Jiggs II as "a very sensitive dog". According to Tunney, marines responsible for Jiggs II were under orders "never to scold him". Two early instances of bad behavior were, nonetheless, attributed to Jiggs II; on one occasion he bit an ice man, and on another occasion he chased a stenographer down the hallway of the State, War, and Navy Building.

Jiggs II died in 1937 and was buried at Marine Corps Base Quantico with full military honors.

== See also ==
- Chesty (mascot)
- List of individual dogs

== Notes ==
Military offices
Preceded by Jiggs I	Mascot of the U.S. Marine Corps; 1927–1937	Succeeded by Smedley
