= Emrys =

Emrys is a Welsh name (the Welsh form of Ambrose) and may refer to:

- Allan Emrys Blakeney (1925–2011), tenth Premier of the Canadian province of Saskatchewan (1971–1982)
- Charles Emrys Smith, Senior Lecturer in Economics and Education
- Emrys ap Iwan (1851–1906), literary critic and writer on politics and religion
- Emrys Davies (1904–1975), Glamorgan cricketer and later a Test cricket umpire
- Emrys Evans (1891–1966), Welsh classicist and university principal
- Emrys Evans (rugby) (1911–1983), Welsh dual-code international rugby union and rugby league footballer
- Emrys G. Bowen (1900–1983), geographer
- Emrys Hughes (1894–1969), Welsh Labour politician
- Emrys Hughes (rugby league), Welsh rugby league footballer who played in the 1930s
- Emrys James (1928–1989), Welsh Shakespearean actor
- Emrys Jones (geographer), Professor of Geography at the London School of Economics
- Emrys Jones (actor) (1915–1972), English actor
- Emrys Roberts (Liberal politician) (1910–1990), Welsh Liberal politician and businessman
- Emrys Roberts (poet) (1929–2012), Archdruid and poet
- Emrys Westacott (born 1956), American philosopher
- Emrys Wledig, Welsh for Ambrosius Aurelianus, 5th century war leader of the Romano-British
- John Emrys Lloyd (1905–1987), British fencer
- Paul Emrys-Evans (1894–1967), British Conservative Party politician
- Ruthanna Emrys, American novelist
- William Ambrose (Emrys) (1813–1873), 19th century Welsh language poet
- William Emrys Williams (1896–1977), Editor-in-Chief of Penguin Books from 1936 to 1965

== Fictional characters ==
- Emrys Killebrew from Marvel Comics who created Deadpool.
- Merlin (Emrys) from the 2008 BBC fantasy drama television series Merlin.

== See also ==
- Dinas Emrys (Welsh: fortress of Ambrosius), a rocky and wooded hillock near Beddgelert in Gwynedd, Wales
- Emarosa
- Emarèse
- Imerys
- Merlin
