= Emrys Westacott =

American philosopher (born 1956)

- Born: 1956 (age 69–70)

Education
- Education: University of Texas at Austin (PhD), McGill University (MA), University of Sheffield (BA)
- Thesis: Relativism and the Critique of Reason
- Doctoral advisor: Robert H. Kane
- Other advisor: George di Giovanni

Philosophical work
- Era: 21st-century philosophy
- Region: Western philosophy
- Institutions: Alfred University
- Main interests: ethics, history of philosophy, metaphysics
- Website: sites.google.com/site/ewestacott/

Emrys Westacott (born 1956) is a retired English philosopher and Professor of Philosophy, previously at Alfred University. He is known for his works on ethics.

== Books ==
- The Wisdom of Frugality, Princeton University Press, 2016. (translated into Italian, Korean, Simple Chinese and Complex Chinese)
- The Virtues of our Vices, Princeton University Press, 2012. (translated into Simple Chinese, Complex Chinese, and Portuguese)
- Thinking Through Philosophy, with Chris Horner, Cambridge University Press, 2000. (translated into Chinese, Turkish, and Persian)
