= Chesty (mascot) =

Unofficial mascot of the US Marine Corps

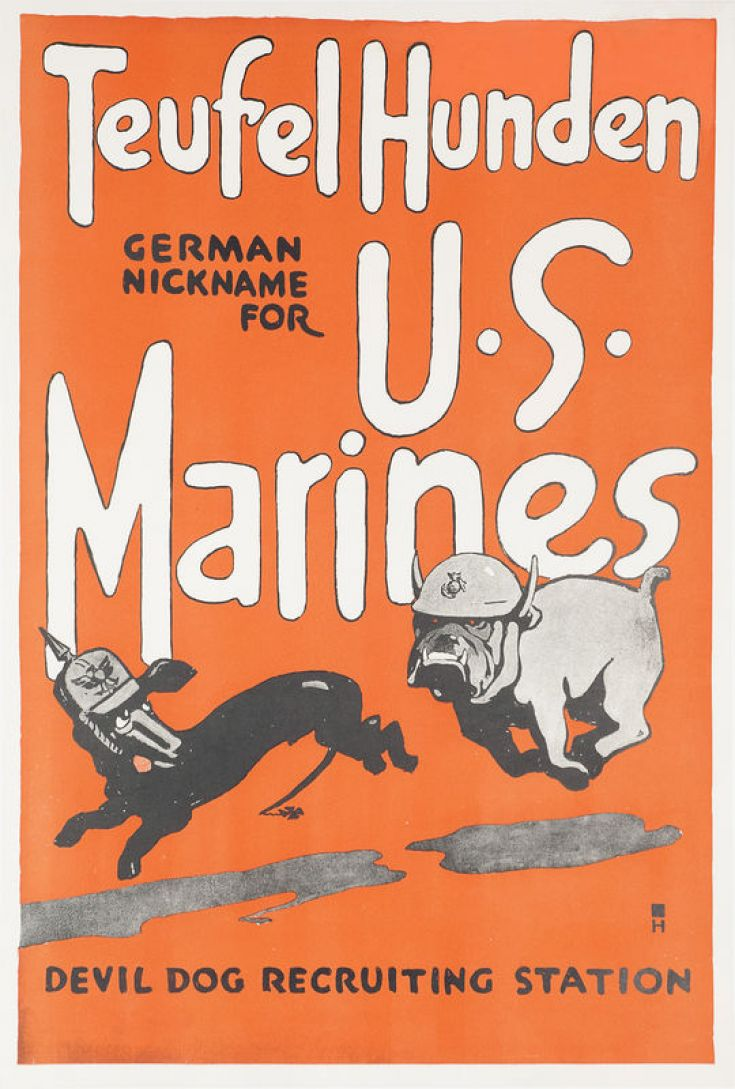
1918 recruitment post using the "devil dogs" nickname.

Chesty, a Bulldog, is the unofficial mascot of the United States Marine Corps. The first Chesty was named after Chesty Puller—the most highly decorated Marine in history—in July 1957. The current dog, Chesty XVII, is the 17th mascot named Chesty. Chesty's duties include attending drills, parades, and community events.

== Background ==
The U.S. Marine Corps have had a bulldog as a mascot since 1922, shortly after WWI, when they were allegedly called "devil dogs" (German: Teufelshunde) by their German opponents during the Battle of Belleau Wood. According to Bob Aquilina of the Marine Corps History Division, the term actually predated the battle. The first bulldog mascot was called Jiggs, who was succeeded by Private Pagett, then Jiggs II, and then several Smedleys, named after General Smedley Butler, then the most-decorated Marine. The first Chesty was named in July 1957, after Chesty Puller, the most decorated Marine in history. Since then, the Marine Corps mascot at the Washington Barracks, their oldest post, has been named Chesty, with an incrementing Roman numeral.

== Past and present Chestys ==
Chesty is always an English bulldog. The current dog, Chesty XVI, is the 16th bulldog mascot of the Marine Corps. He took over as mascot in May 2022. Chesty's duties include attending drills and parades along with the Marine Corps Silent Drill Platoon, and joining community events. Chesty traditionally participates in every Friday Evening Parade. They have their own uniforms and receive promotions and medals like their human colleagues. Each Chesty starts at "recruit" and is traditionally mentored by the previous Chesty for some time until being promoted to private when he is ready to take up his duties. Training for Chesty includes standard dog command such as sitting when asked, and friendly interactions with parade crowds. After several years of service, the dogs are honorably discharged and adopted out.

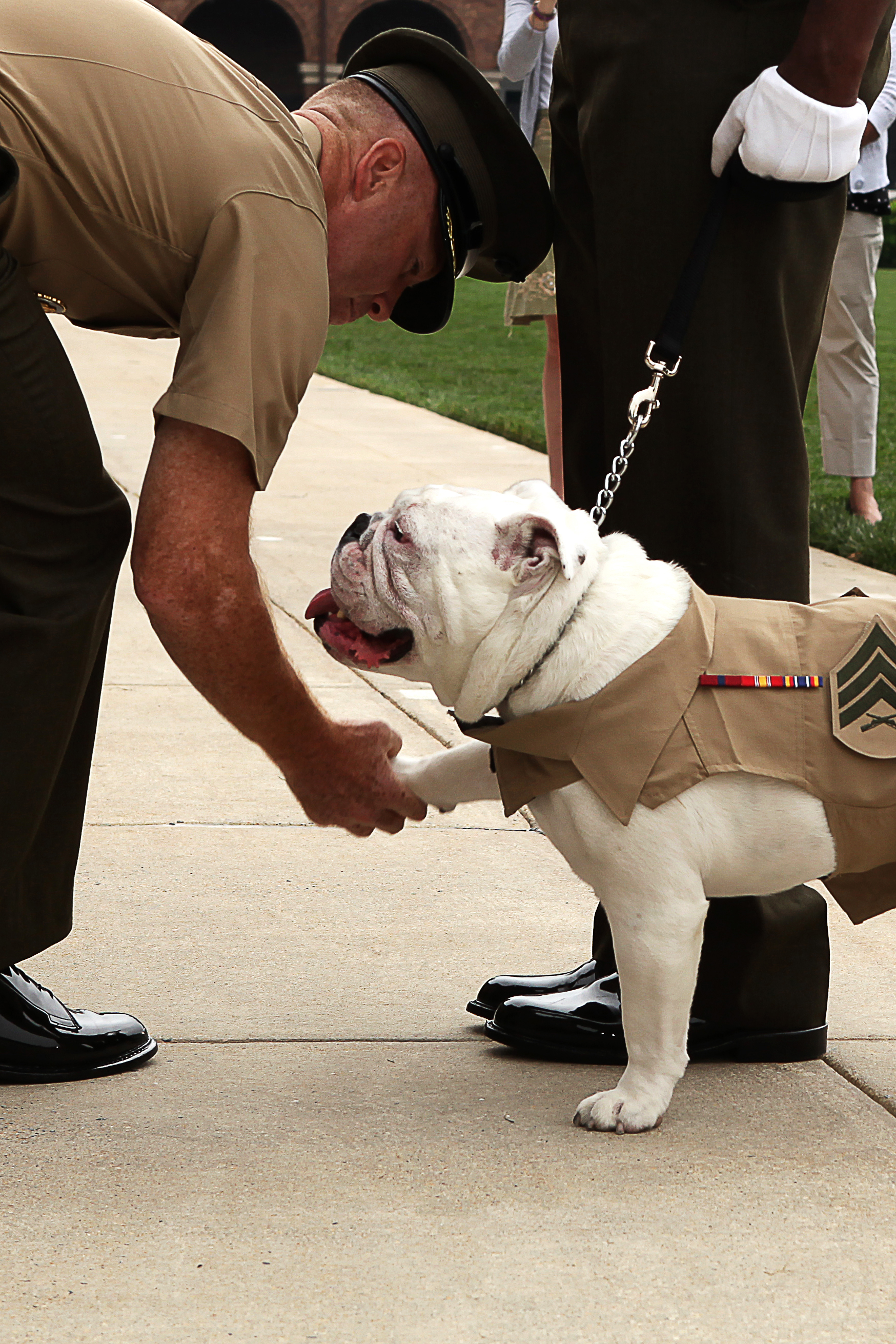
Chesty XIII congratulated on promotion to sergeant.

Past dogs have included Chesty VI, who was demoted to private from private first class for "willfully… ripping and tearing up an Everlast striking bag, of value of about $176.80, military property of the United States" and disobeying a direct order to stay away from the punching bag, and later received two weeks of extra duty for biting two corporals on the foot. Chesty XIII caused an incident by snarling at a dog owned by Leon Panetta, then Defense Secretary, while Chesty II went absent without leave several times. Chesty XV had to be pardoned by the secretary of the Navy Carlos Del Toro at his retirement ceremony for misconduct like jumping on parade guests. On the other hand, his successor Chesty XVI was promoted to private first class by Del Toro, who cited his "nearly spotless record".
