= NYPD Police Band =

American Police band in New York City

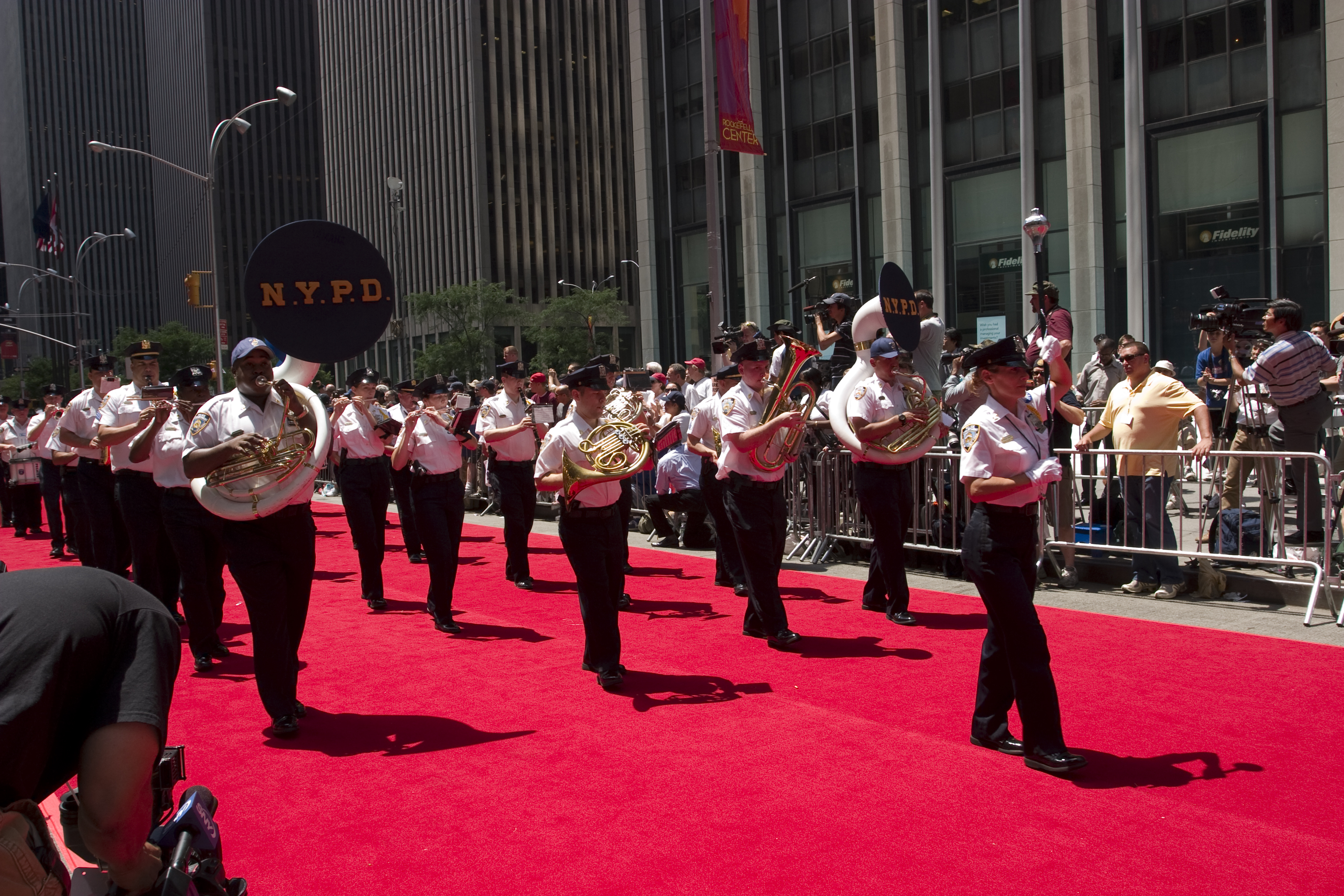
The NYPD Band at the 2008 All Star Game Red Carpet Parade.

The Band of the City of New York Police Department, commonly known as the NYPD Police Band, is an American Police band which serves under the NYPD in New York City. The band currently has 70 members and is part of the NYPD Ceremonial Unit. The band's motto is as follows: Serve, Protect and Entertain. The NYPD Band performs at department ceremonies, parades and community events across the city and in concerts around the world.

== History ==
The band was founded in 1991, when the NYPD decided that it needed a ceremonial unit to provide musical accompaniment. It was originally founded with 12 members. The band had originally existed from 1901 to 1955 in order for the NYPD to be represented during official functions of the city.

== Ensembles ==
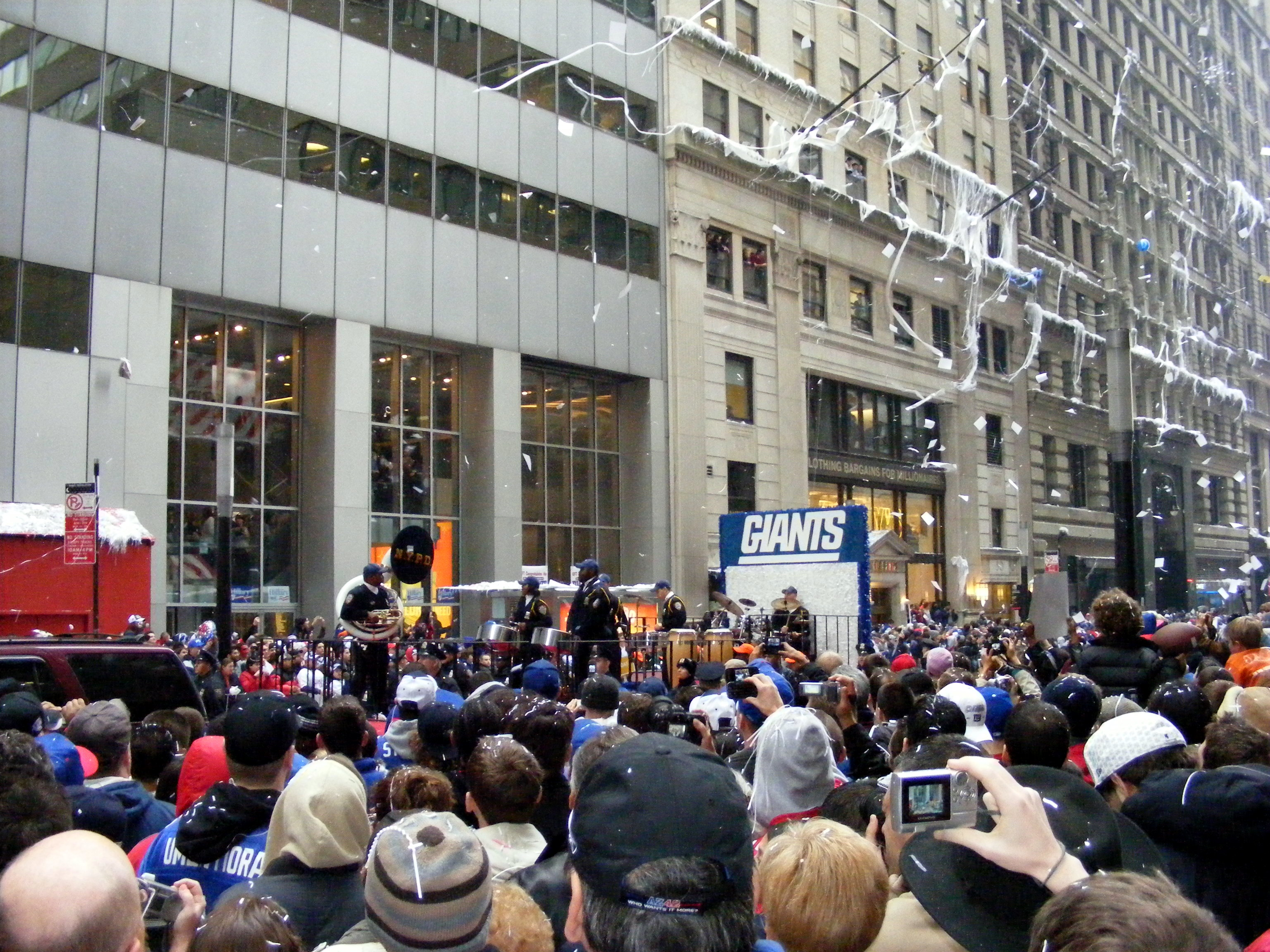
The band in February 2008.

=== Marching Band ===
The marching band is the premier ensemble of the NYPD Band. It is an annual participant in the Columbus Day parade and the Macy's Thanksgiving Day Parade. It also performed at events such as the National Police Parade. It also took part in events such as the 2011 edition of the Quebec City International Festival of Military Bands, which included a performance of God Bless America with the Alexandrov Ensemble of the Russian military. In May 2018, the band jointly performed with the Alexandria Ceremonial Police Orchestra from Israeli film The Band's Visit.

=== Percussion Ensemble ===
The Percussion Ensemble, commonly known as the drumline consists of many different percussion instruments, including field snare drums, bass drums, cymbals, tenor drums, as well as alternative percussion instruments such as timbales, and shakers.

=== Jazz Ensemble ===
The Jazz Ensemble is composed of 18 members from the band. It was formed in 2005 as a subset of the marching band. It gives Jazz and Pop performances.

=== Steel Drum Ensemble ===
The Steel Drum Ensemble was formed in 2004 and performs during the Brooklyn West Indian American Day Parade and Bronx Caribbean Day Parade.

== Longtime bandleader ==
Lieutenant Tony Giorgio was the founder and is the current director of the band. Giorgio is a graduate of C.W. Post (now the LIU Post) and has had training from musicians like Charlie Perry, Jack DeJohnette and Ron Gould. He is also a graduate of the FBI National Academy in Quantico, Virginia. He has been a member of the New York City Police Department since 1983. He was promoted to Sergeant in 1988 and Lieutenant in 1997. In 1996, Giorgio was awarded the New York City Police Foundation's Hemmerdinger Award for excellence and outstanding contributions to Police Services in New York City. Giorgio retired in July 2019.

== Main repertoire ==
The band's main repertoire includes, but is not limited to:

- Amazing Grace
- Armed Forces Medley
- America the Beautiful
- Bad Boys
- Christmas Medley
- Fanfare for the Common Man
- Mission Impossible
- Notre Dame Victory March
- On Broadway
- Star Spangled Banner
- The Navy Hymn
- The Stars and Stripes Forever
- This is My Country

== See also ==
- NYPD Pipes and Drums
- Milwaukee Police Band
- Ceremonial Band of the Waterloo Regional Police
- Garda Band
