= Virginia International Tattoo =

Military tattoo in Norfolk, Virginia, US

- Genre: Patriotic, concert band, military, marching
- Dates: Late April Each Year
- Locations: Norfolk, Virginia, USA
- Years active: 1997–present
- Website: Official website

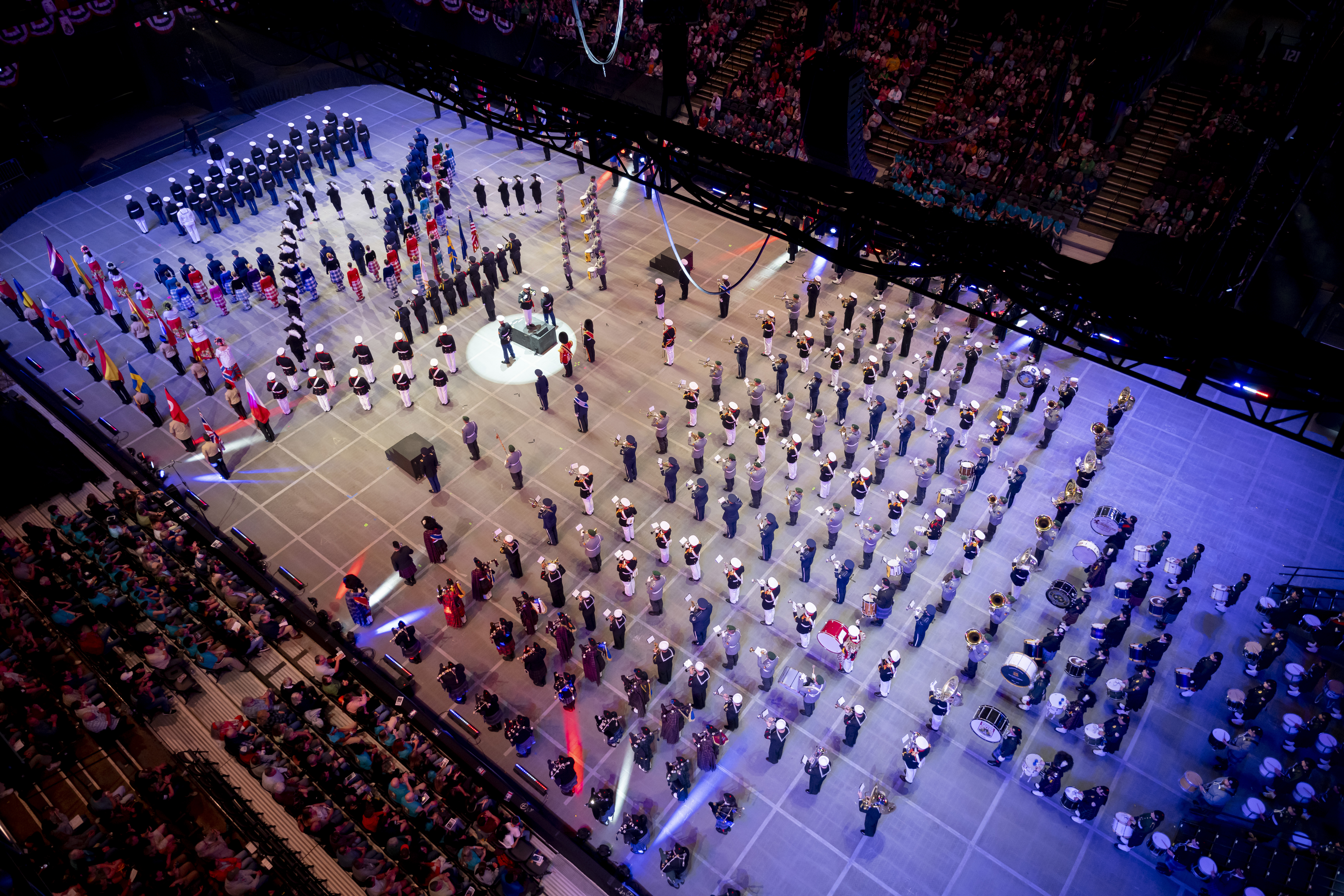

The Virginia International Tattoo is a military tattoo that began in 1997 and is the signature event of the Virginia Arts Festival, a not-for-profit performing arts organization based in Norfolk, Virginia.

The event was established in 1997, and is held annually in Norfolk, Virginia. The Tattoo is an exhibition of military bands, massed pipes and drums, drill teams, Celtic dancers, and choirs. It is presented in cooperation with NATO and the Norfolk NATO Festival.

It is the largest show of its kind in the United States, involving a cast of over 800 performers from around the world. Over 38,000 people attend each year, including over 12,000 area students. The Virginia International Tattoo was listed as American Bus Association's Top North American Event for 2016. The tattoo is considered to be one of the seven “founding members” of the International Association of Tattoo Organizers (IATO). The Tattoo, like many other events, did not take place in 2020 due to the COVID-19 pandemic.

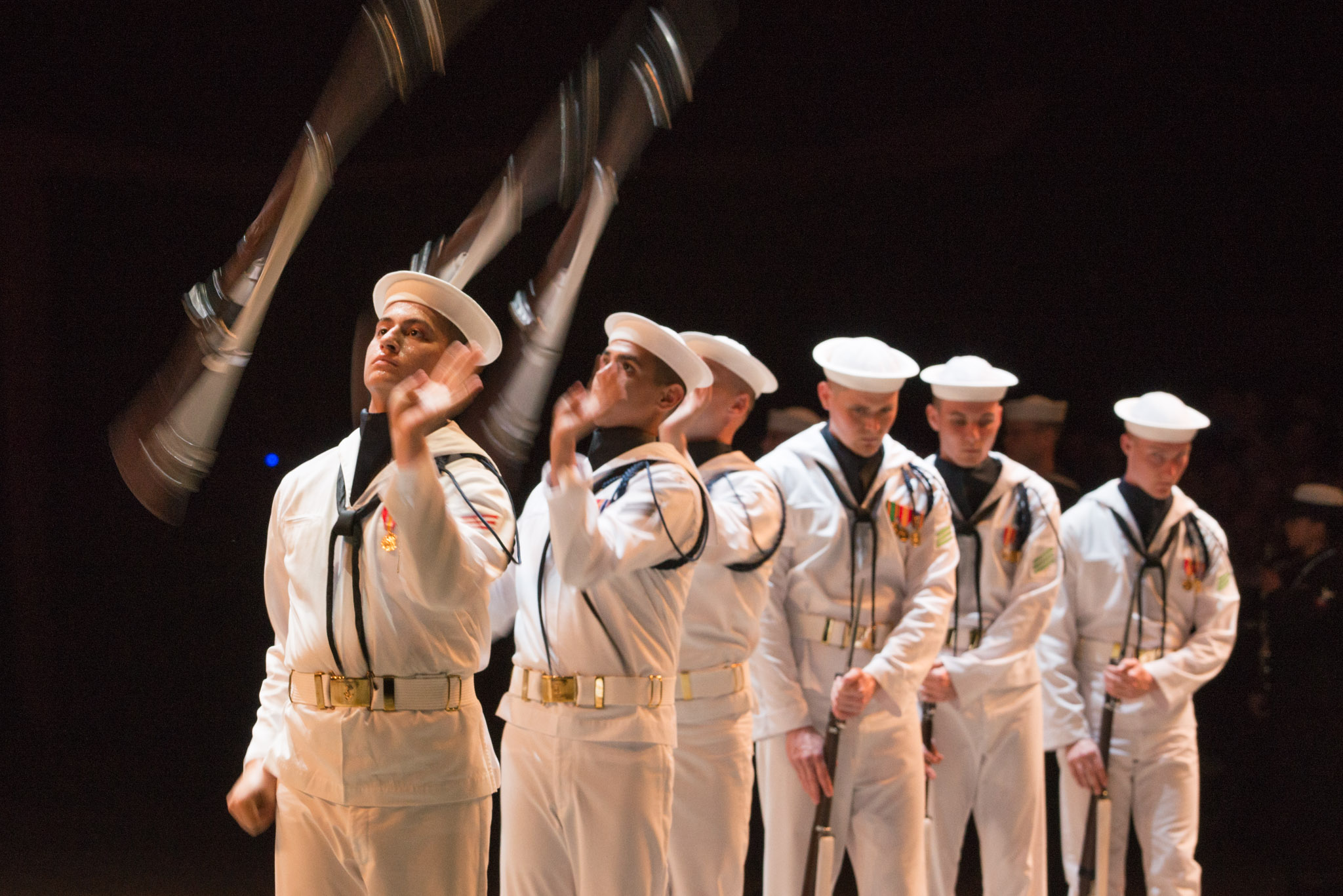
The United States Navy Ceremonial Guard

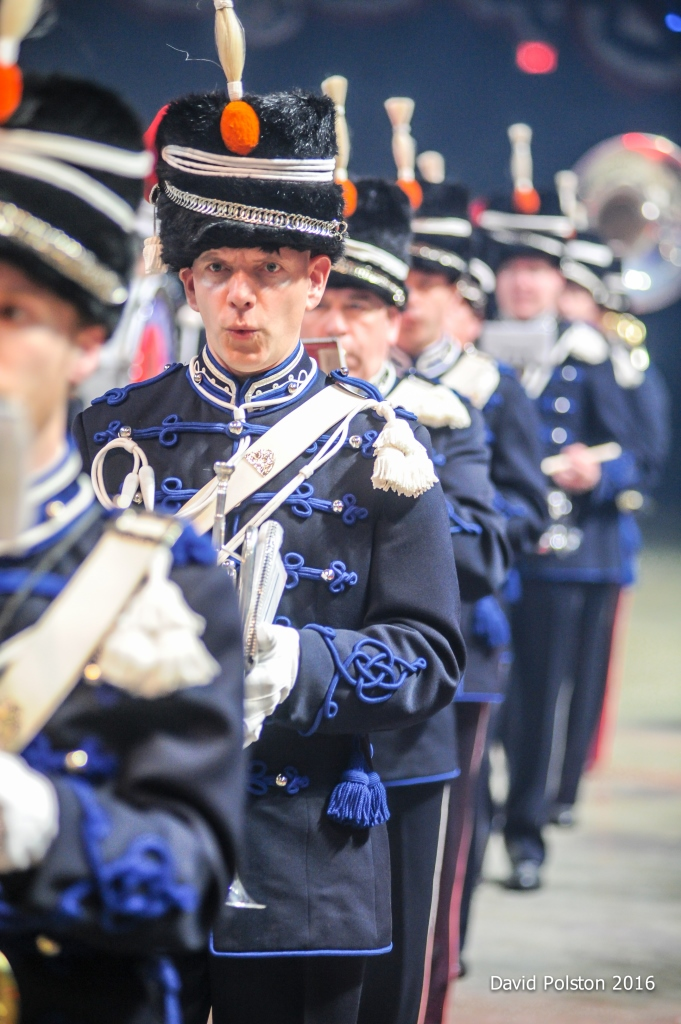
The Fanfare Band of the Royal Marechaussee

For over 20 years, the Virginia International Tattoo has presented performers from Albania, Australia, Belgium, Bermuda, Canada, the Czech Republic, Denmark, Estonia, Finland, France, Germany, Italy, Jordan, The Netherlands, New Zealand, Norway, Oman, Ireland, South Korea, Romania, Russia, Singapore, and Ukraine.

== Tattoo Weekend Events ==
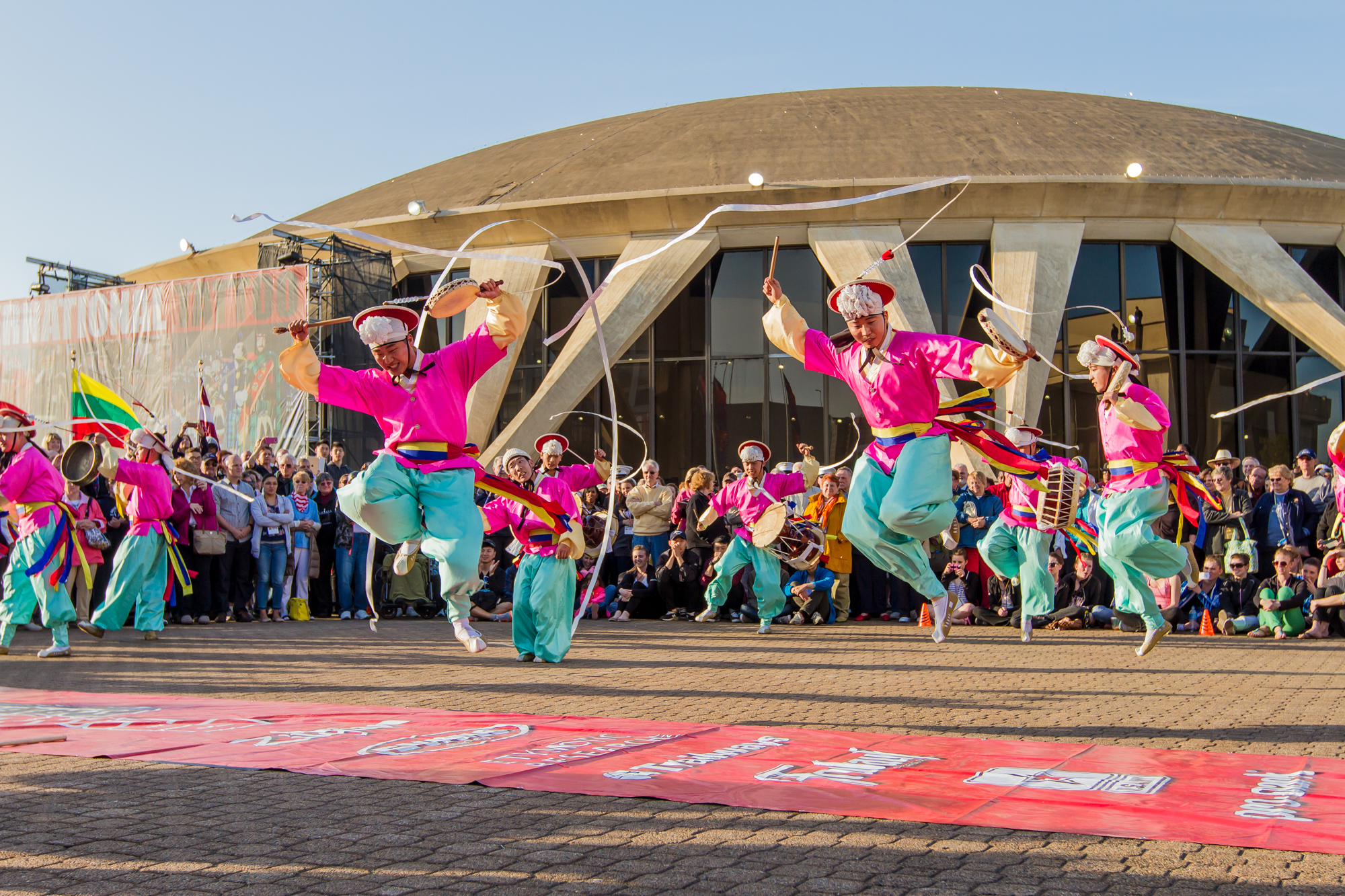
Performers on Scope Plaza during Hullabaloo.

Tattoo Hullabaloo

Hullabaloo is a free outdoor festival of pipers, dancers, drill teams and drum lines which starts three hours prior to each performance of the Virginia International Tattoo. A variety of food and beer is available for purchase. The event is located on Scope Plaza, Norfolk, Virginia.

=== Tattoo Hullabaloo International Drumming Showcase ===
A Hullabaloo favorite, this event showcases marching percussion ensembles of any instrumentation, spotlighting their unique talents and creativity. This event is located on Scope Plaza, Norfolk, Virginia in partnership with Drum Corps International.

==== Virginia International Tattoo American Pipe Band Championship ====
The Virginia International Tattoo hosted the first Virginia International Tattoo American Pipe Band Championship in 2016. The competition, which coincides with the Tattoo performance weekend, will feature hundreds of bagpipers and drummers as they compete for the honors in this annual competition. This event is located on Scope Plaza, Norfolk, Virginia.

===== Norfolk NATO Festival =====
The Norfolk NATO Festival is a celebration and reflection of the North Atlantic Treaty Organization countries and the bond they have. Member nations are on display through the kickoff parade, NATO village, kids zone, music, performances and food. Attendees learn about each culture and its history.

The Norfolk NATO Festival's highlight is the annual Parade of Nations, the longest continuous parade in Hampton Roads and the only Parade in the United States honoring NATO. Over 100 Parade Units with local and visiting high school bands, US and International Military bands, and colorful floats which represent each of the 29 NATO member nations and their respective armed forces, are featured. Local community organization and Festival partners are also featured. This event is located at Town Point Park, Norfolk, Virginia. The civil-military parade and pageant involves a cast of over 800 artists from many different countries, and has over 28,000 people attending every year, including over 12,000 area students at the annual student matinees.

The Virginia International Tattoo is, since 2007, one of the seven founding members of the International Association of Tattoo Organizers (IATO).

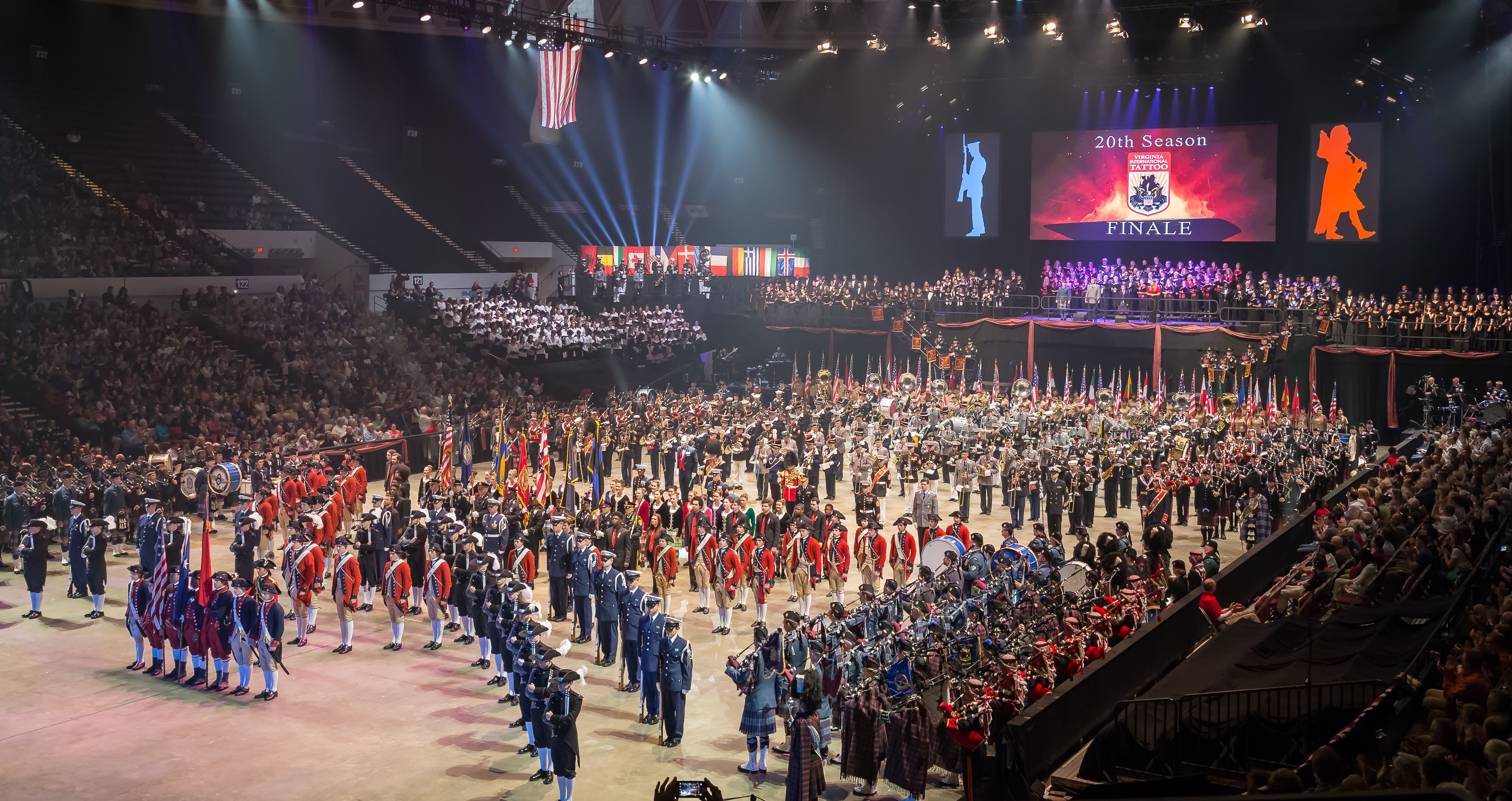
The massed band finale.

The Flag Raising ceremony is a cultural sampling of music and a colorful display of NATO Member National flags and uniforms in this military presentation representing all 29 NATO member nations. Each Nation's representative will present the national flag, while a portion of their national anthem is performed by the United States Fleet Forces Band. This custom was not observed in the 2022 flag raising, where only the NATO hymn and US national anthem were played.
