= Police band =

Police band may refer to:

- The range of frequencies used by police radios, see spectrum management
- Police band (music), set up by a police force
- The Police, a British rock band
