= Police band (music) =

Military-style band operated or sponsored by a police force

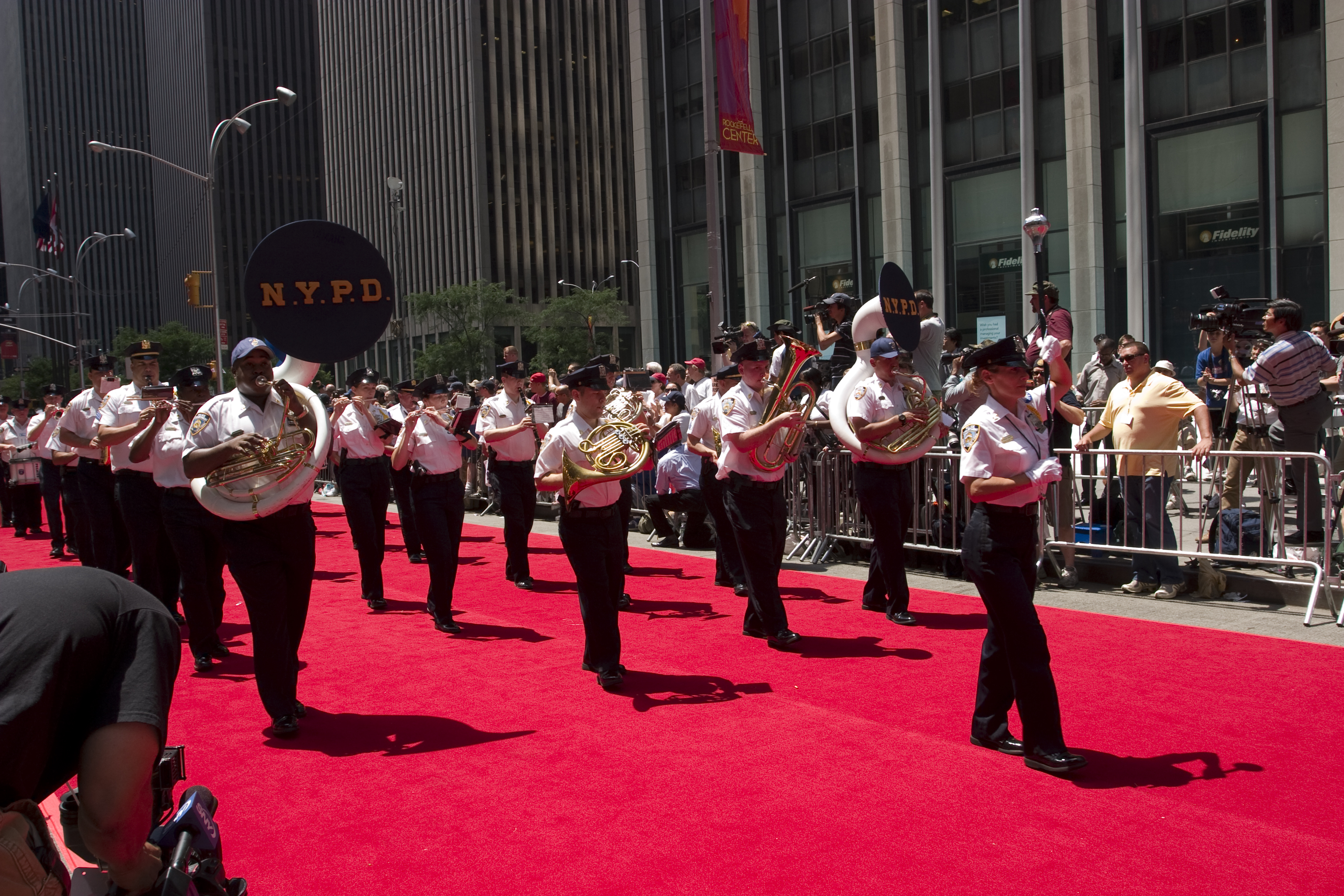
The NYPD Police Band in 2008.

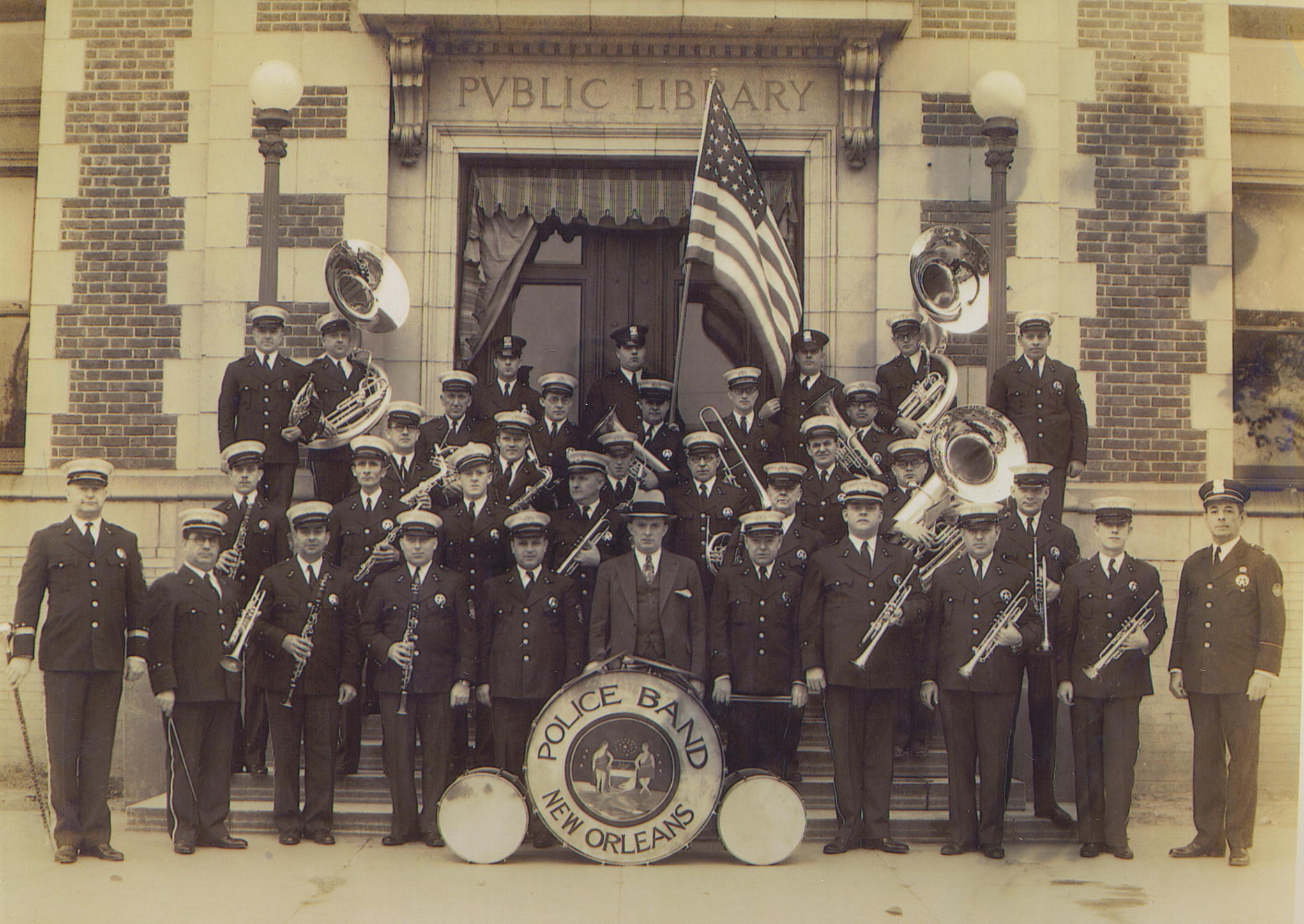
The New Orleans Police band pictured in about 1928.

A police band is a military-style band operated or sponsored by a police force. Police bands provide ceremonial support for civic events, and perform at police observances such as funerals and police academy graduations. Most police bands consists exclusively of professional police officers, while others consist of personnel of law enforcement and other special agencies. Like military bands, their repertoire is mostly composed of ceremonial marching music and honors music (national anthems and fanfares).

== History ==
The earliest instance of a police band was the Glasgow Police Pipe Band, originally called the Burgh of Govan Police Pipe Band, which was formed in Glasgow, Scotland in 1883, and was soon followed by a similar organization formed in Edinburgh. The first-organized police band in Australia was that of the Grayville Police Band, which was established in 1884. Thirteen years later, in 1897, the Milwaukee Police Band became the first such ensemble to be formed in the United States. Founded in 1909, the Polizeimusik Wien from the Austrian Federal Police is the oldest European police band. The Vancouver Police Pipe Band was formed in 1914.

Police bands in much of the English-speaking world have often taken the form of pipe bands, owing to a history of organizational emulation of the earliest police bands formed in Scotland. In the United States, bagpipes have "become the adopted instrument of the law enforcement community".

== Notable Police Band Festivals and events ==
The band of the Queensland Police Service shown during Queensland Police Academy graduation ceremonies in 2014.

In 1994 the first World Police Band Concert was organized in Tokyo, Japan. As of 2016, 21 annual editions of the event had been held, which includes a public parade and indoor concert by invited bands.

The International Festival of Police Orchestras and Choirs ("FESTPOL") has been held in Prague, Czech Republic since 2004 and features police bands from a number of nations. It is sponsored by the Band of the Castle Guards and the Police of the Czech Republic.

== Police bands by country ==
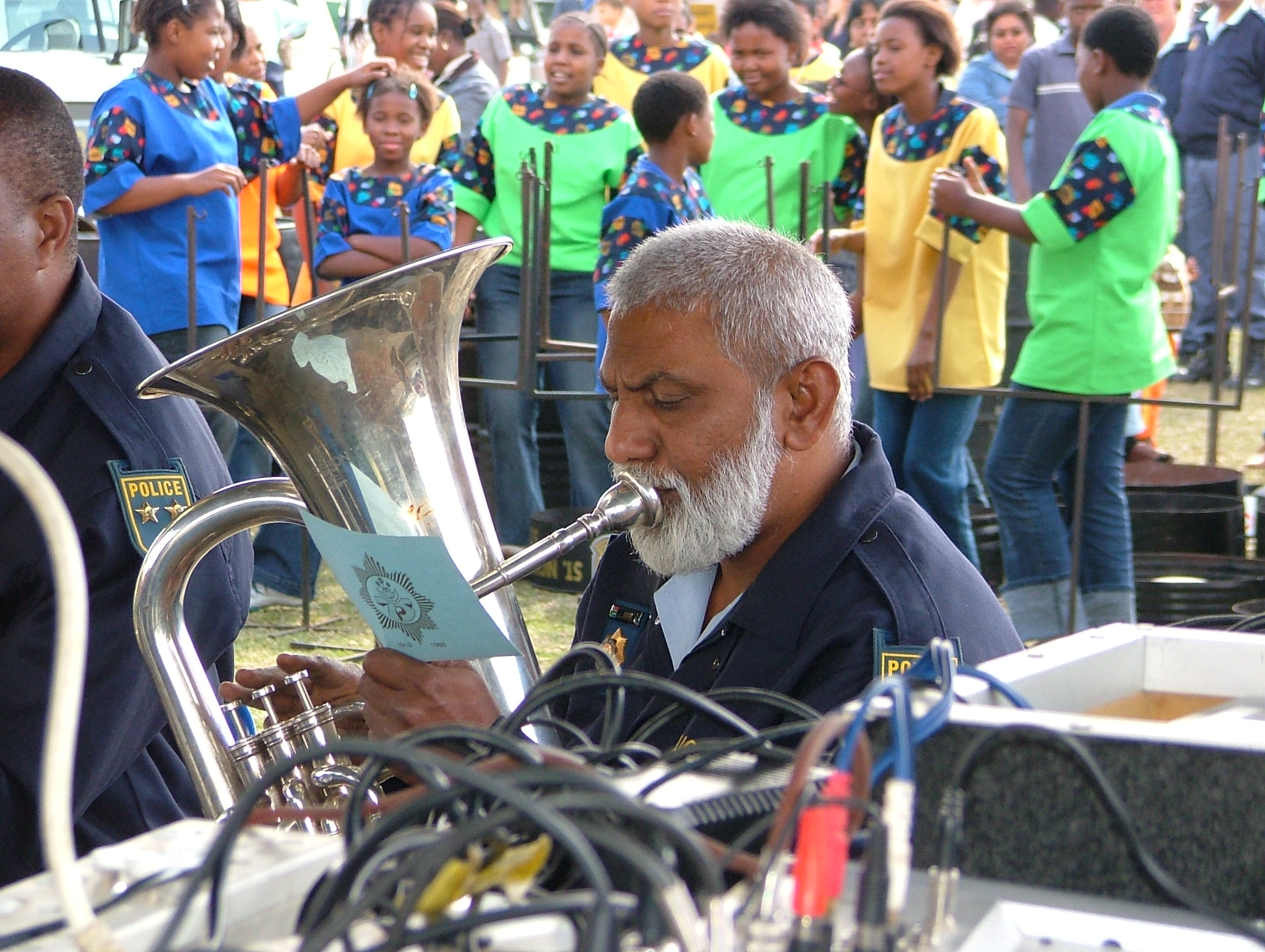
A musician of the South African Police Service.

=== Africa ===
==== Ghana ====
The Ghana Police Central Band is one of four uniformed marching bands in the country responsible for state functions. It is part of the Ghana Police Service and performs at a variety of national and local event son behalf of the GPS. It was originally known as the Gold Coast Police Band when it was founded in 1918, only to be changed in the 1960s. Despite not being part of the GPS, the Ghana Prisons Service Regimental Band is also a fully functional police band as it is part of the Ministry of Interior. Established in May 1977, the regiment band is composed of over 150 musicians who combined make up a section in the recruitment course.

==== Nigeria ====
The following police bands exist in Nigeria:

- Nigeria Police Band (headquarter band in Abuja)
- Nigeria Police School of Music
- Nigeria Police Academy Cadet Band
- Zonal Police Bands
  - Lagos State Police Command Band (established in 2026)

==== Malawi ====
The Malawi Police Band is the police band of the Republic of Malawi. It performs at rituals of state as well as celebrations of the Police Force. Gray John Stewart Mtila, the father of the current President Joyce Banda, was a member of the band.

==== Kenya ====
Kenya maintains several police bands in its borders:

- Kenya Police Band
- General Service Unit Band – The GSU Band was founded in 1980 as a corps of drums until 1994, when recruited personnel trained in brass instruments.
- Administration Police Band
- Kenya Prisons Band

All four bands have a history of participating in major national events, including Jamhuri Day celebrations as well as festivities in honor of Heroes' Day and Mashujaa Day (formerly Kenyatta Day).

==== South Africa ====
Police bands in South Africa are affiliated with the South African Police Service. The South African Police (SAPS) Band was initially established in Pretoria in 1903. It follows British military traditions as well as the musical traditions of the South African National Defence Force and its military band. They began to grow in the 1960s. In the early 2000s, nine police bands were established throughout the country. Later on, a tenth band was founded at the Office of the SAPS HQ in Tshwane.

=== Asia ===
==== China ====
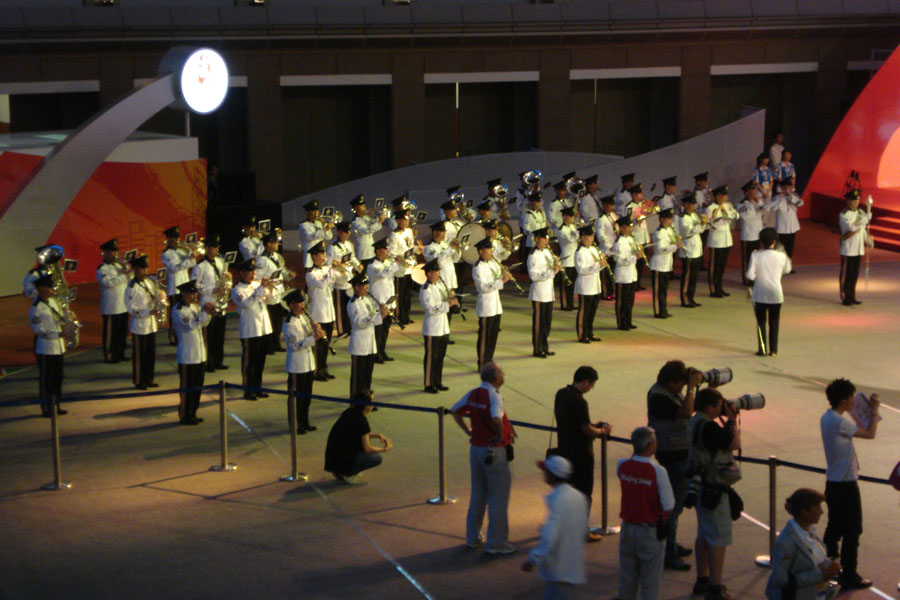
Hong Kong Police Band

The Band of the People's Armed Police of China (人民武装警察乐队) is the senior police band in the people's republic. It was founded in 1986 and is currently a part of the Political Work Department of the PAP. It is primarily responsible for the monthly performance of March of the Volunteers at the national flagpole at the Tiananmen Square, during a flag raising ceremony which is done with the Beijing Garrison Honor Guard Battalion.

==== Hong Kong ====
The Hong Kong Police Band serves as the main police band of the country, under the auspices of the Hong Kong Police Force (HKPF), the Hong Kong Police College, and the Foundation Training Centre. It uses many British and international military traditions for bands, such as the British use of a pipes band group and drum major similar to the drum majors in the Bands of the Household Division.

==== India ====
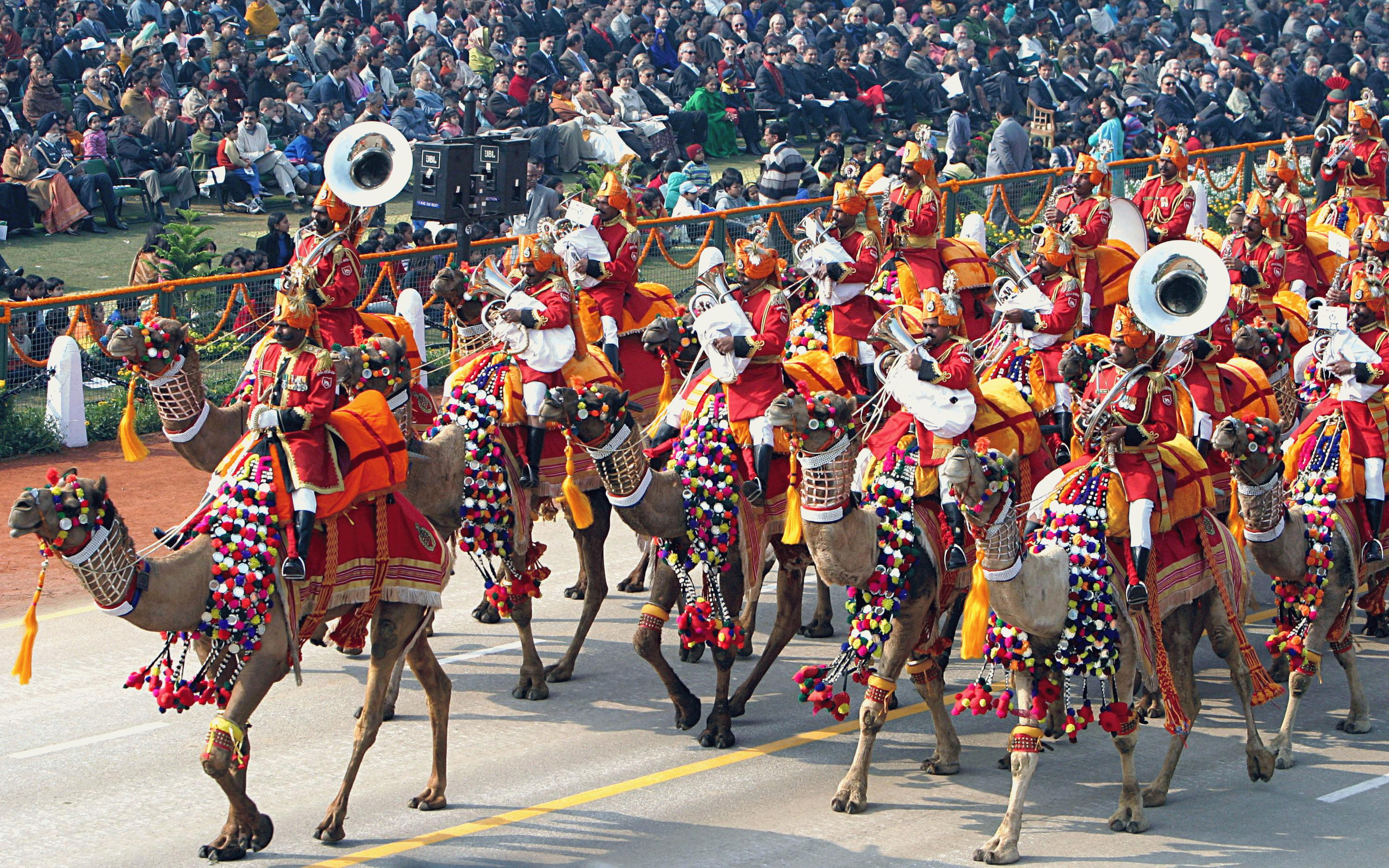
The unique BSF Camel Contingent during the annual Republic Day Parade in 2004.

The following Indian paramilitary forces maintain police bands:

- Central Reserve Police Force Brass Band
- Central Industrial Security Force Band
- Border Security Force Band
- Border Security Force Mounted Band
- Band and Pipes and Drums of the Assam Rifles

The 36-member camel mounted band of the Indian Border Security Force is one of two official bands in the BSF. It is uniquely the only camel mounted police band in the world, with the only other band coming close is the Royal Cavalry Mounted Band in Oman. It is mentioned in Guinness Book of World Records as such. It is one of the unique sights of the Delhi Republic Day parade and has been an annual participant since 1990. The only time it has missed a parade was in 2016 due to a lack of preparation.

The Delhi Police Band serves as a major police band in the national capital. In October 2015, the State of Gujarat ordered the foundation the first female police band in its ranks.

The All India Police Band Competition is held annually and consists of different pplice bands competing against each other. It was created in 2000.

The following have hosted the competition since its inception:

- Rajasthan Police Academy (2016)
- Telangana (2020)

==== Macau ====
The Public Security Police Force Band also serves ceremonial functions in Macau. The PSP Band was created in 1951 under Luis Augusto de Matos Paletti as its director.

==== Nepal ====
The School of Music at the National Police Academy (NPA) is the epicenter for all Nepalese police bands. Established in 1952, the original central band was given its current name in 2006 and today, organizes affiliated bands stationed in the following areas: Biratnagar, Bharatpur, Butwal, Nepalgunj, and Dipayal. Nationwide, there are a total of 415 musicians, with each band having 31 musicians each. The largest of these bands is the central band at the NPA in Maharajgung, numbering around 260 band members, and is organized into a marching, band, pipes and drums and a bugle section.

==== Oman ====
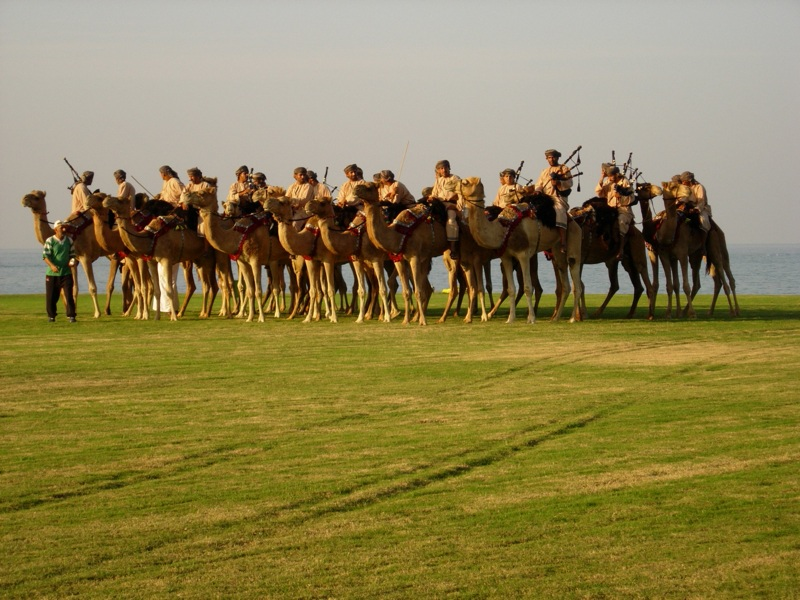
ROP Camel Band

The Royal Oman Police maintains a camel mounted band based in Muscat. The ROP also oversees various police pipe and marching bands, which are based throughout the country.

==== Singapore ====
The Singapore Police Force and the Singapore Armed Forces maintains a host of musical groups and marching bands, with the Singapore Police Force Band (SPF Band) being the most senior police band in the country. SPF Band members also serve as regular police officers, who perform their policing duties at the local Neighbourhood police centre. Similarly, the Gurkha Contingent Pipes and Drums Platoon was founded in 1955 and the Women Police Pipes and Drums being founded in 1972, with both serving as official police bands.

=== Europe ===
==== Belgium ====
Belgian police bands in the Federal Police and the Local Police follow the French precedent as well as the precedent laid out by the Belgian Armed Forces. There are currently seven active Belgian police bands. The Royal Music Band of the Antwerp Police is the oldest of these, having been the police band in the city of Antwerp since 1901. The list of police bands are as follows:

- Brussels Police Band
- Royal Music Band of the Mechelen Police
- Royal Music Band of the Ghent Police
- Royal Music of the Police of Namur
- Royal Music Band of the Antwerp Police

==== Bosnia and Herzegovina ====
Police Band of the Ministry of Interior of Republika Srpska is first and only of that type band in Republika Srpska and Bosnia and Herzegovina. Band is under control of the Ministry of Interior of Republika Srpska and it is based in Banja Luka.

==== Estonia ====
In the Estonian Republic, the Police and Border Guard Board maintains a full piece police band (politseiorkester) under the Estonian Ministry of the Interior. The 34 member band is the predecessor to the Tallinn Police Brass Band, established in 1928. It was disbanded in 1940 due to the German and later Soviet occupation of Estonia. In 1992, the Estonian Police Band and the Border Guard Band were established in the newly independent country as separate institutions, on the basis of the bands of Soviet era institutions in Estonia – the Republican Militia of Estonia under the Ministry of the Interior and the Border Guard Service of the KGB of Estonia. In 2010, when the Police and Border Guard Board was established, two bands were merged, and the combined unit was renamed to the Police and Border Guard Band.

The conductors of the band have been the following:

- Johannes Kostabi (1928–1940)
- Kaido Kodumäe (1992–2010) (Police)
- Arvi Miido (1992–2014) (Border Guard and merged band)
- Hando Põldmäe (2014-Present)

The Police and Border Guard Band performs at ceremonies and anniversaries of the Police and Border Guard Board and the Estonian Military Academy.

==== Finland ====
The Helsinki Police Symphonic Band is the only professional music ensemble of the Police of Finland. The 43-member orchestra is widely known for its versatile repertoire. It plays regular concerts with some of the best soloists from various genres. Nationwide educating concerts for children and the young are an important part of the activity, as well.

The band was first founded in 1947. It has always had the privilege to work with recognized conductors, including famous Georg Malmstén. Since 2012, Sami Ruusuvuori has worked as the chief conductor of the band.

Many of the musicians spend half of their working hours in various duties in the police department's traffic police.

==== France ====
The Music Band of the National Police is the Ministry of the Interior's official music ensemble and the chief police band in the French state. Like its counterpart the French Republican Guard, includes a concert band as well as a fanfare band. The government also maintains small municipal police bands such as La Musique des Gardiens de la Paix. The Mobile Gendarmerie Music Band also serves as a police band.

==== Germany ====
The Bundespolizei maintains several police bands (German: Polizeiorchester) that are under the control of the Federal Ministry of the Interior, Building and Community. The Federal Police has three professional bands, one in Berlin, one in Hanover, and one in Munich. In addition, state police, city and municipal police bands are present in most states of Germany.

The following is a list of German police bands:

- Federal police bands
  - Berlin Police Band
  - Hanover Police Band
  - Munich Police Band
- Municipal and state bands
  - Baden-Württemberg Police Band
  - Bavarian Police Band
  - Brandenburg Police Band
  - Karlsruhe Police Band
  - Lower Saxony Police Band
  - North Rhine-Westphalia Police Band
  - Rheinland-Pfalz Police Band

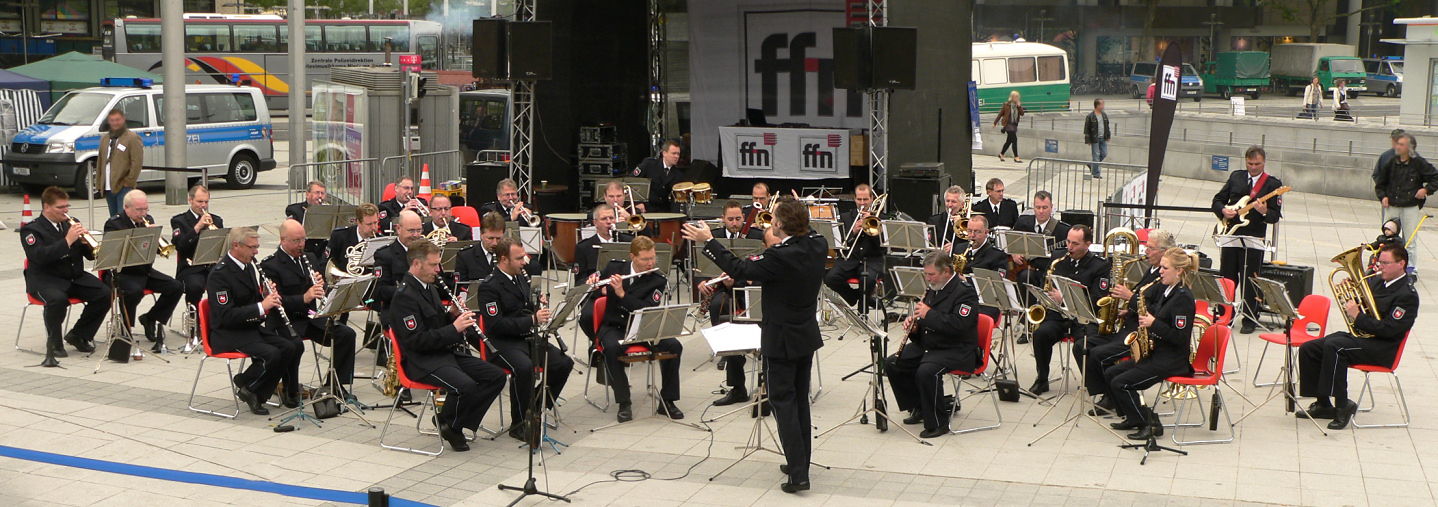
The North Rhine-Westphalia Police Band in Hannover.

The Band of the Berlin People's Police (Orchester der Berliner Volkspolizei) of East Germany was founded on 1 October 1948 in Berlin as the first uniformed wind band based in GDR. It was originally composed of 35 musicians led by Colonel Willi Kaufmann who, past April 1958, performed under the name of the Central Band of the Ministry of the Interior of the GDR. Colonel Kaufmann was transferred in 1960 to the National People's Army to head its musical units, and was eventually succeeded by Wolfgang Ahrendt and Helmut Sommer.

==== Hungary ====
The Hungarian Police Big Band (Hungarian: Készenléti Rendőrség Zenekara) is a uniformed ensemble of the Rendőrség located in Budapest. The band was founded originally in 1923. The Hungarian Police Big Band was formed following the merger of the Border Guard into the Rendőrség on New Year's Eve in 2007 under the direction of Major Béla Szalóky. It combined components of the Border Guard Orchestra with elements of various Hungarian police bands. The band is different from the Hungarian Defense Forces Central Military Band (HDF Central Band) in that it is more of a concert orchestra rather than a massed marching band.

==== Ireland ====
The Garda Band is the most prevalent police band in the Republic of Ireland, serving as the public relations branch of the Garda Síochána. It was founded sometime in 1922 under the leadership of Superintendent D.J. Delaney. It disbanded in 1965, but was reformed just 7 years later to celebrate the 50th anniversary of the founding of the Garda. Other police bands include the following: The Dublin Fire Brigade Pipe Band, The Irish Prison Service Pipe Band, The Irish Ambulance Service Pipe Band and the Airport Police Fire Service Band.

==== Italy ====
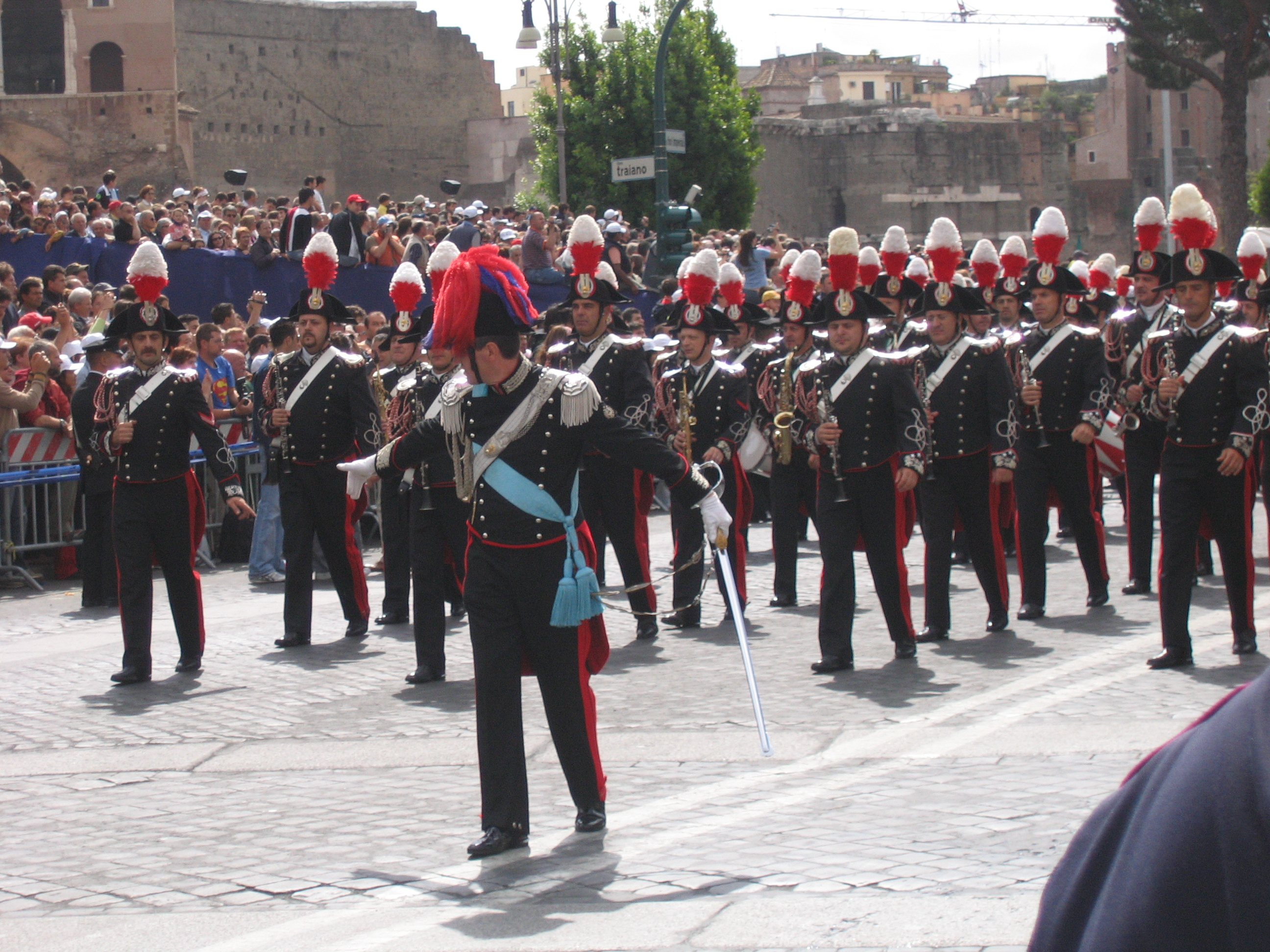
Italian Carabinieri Band

The following is a list of police bands in Italy under police bodies/services:

- Bands of the Polizia di Stato
  - State Police Band
  - Mounted Band of the Italian Polizia di Stato
  - State Police Academy Band

Bands are also maintained in city police departments such as the Rome City Police. Although operationally part of the Italian Armed Forces, Bands of the Arma dei Carabinieri also serve as police bands due to their law enforcement role. The same true for other law enforcement bodies such as the Guardia di Finanza and the Polizia Penitenziaria, who are organized in the following way:

- Bands of the Guardia di Finanza
  - National Band
  - Regimental Band of the Financial Guard Academy
  - Band of the Inspectors and Superintendents School
- Bands of the Polizia Penitenziaria
  - National Marching Band
  - Penological Police Academy Band

==== Lithuania ====
Representative Wind Orchestra of the Ministry of the Interior of Lithuania (Lithuanian: Lietuvos Respublikos vidaus reikalų ministerijos Reprezentacinis pučiamųjų orkestras) is the only Police Band in Lithuania. It was first founded in 1935, when a professional wind orchestra was established in the Police Department in Kaunas. Julius Radžiūnas was chosen as the first conductor of the ensemble. In 1991, when Lithuania regained its independence, it resumed its activities under the direction of Algirdas Kazimieras Radzevičius. In 2008, the band was granted the status of a concert institution. Every year the ensemble prepares at least five new artistic programs.

==== Netherlands ====
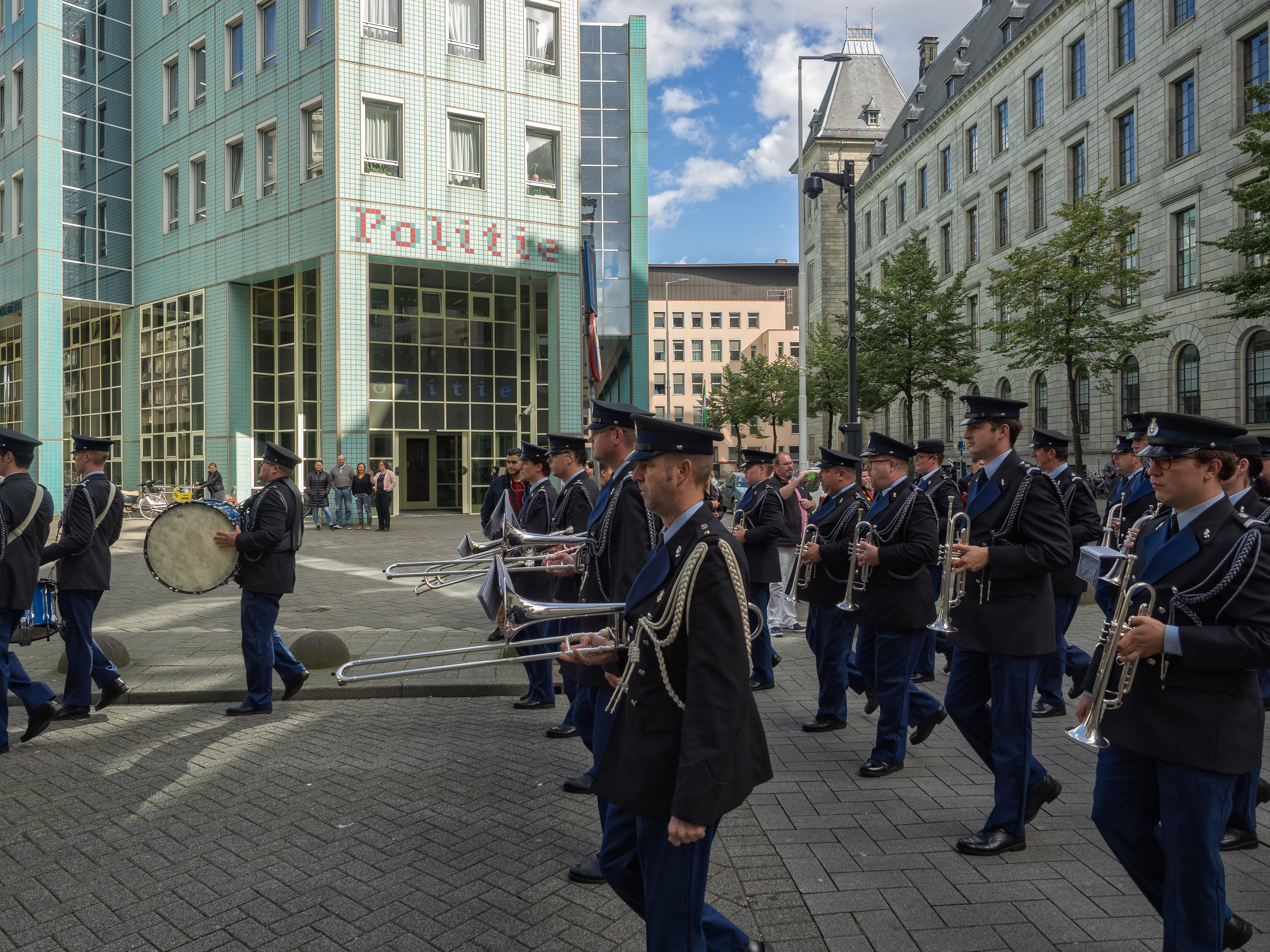
The band in September 2015.

The Trompetterkorps der Koninklijke Marechaussee (Band of His Majesty's Royal Netherlands Military Police) is the military police band of the Netherlands, being attached to the Royal Marechaussee. Abbreviated as TkKMar, the brass band consists of 60 people who are exclusively musicians of the larger military police of the Dutch Armed Forces. It has maintained a trumpet corps as part of it since 2005. It also consists of a copper quintet, a wind orchestra a saxophone quartet, and a big band which date back to the band's founding on 12 April 1950. It performs commonly on national holidays such as Koningsdag, Bevrijdingsdag and Veteranendag, as well as military tattoos in and around the country. It is based at William III barracks in Apeldoorn.

Established in 1995, the Dutch Police Band (Dutch: Nederlands Politieorkest, NPO) consists of 55 musicians working for the National Police Corps, coming from all regional police departments in the country.

==== Poland ====
The Representative Band of the Polish Police (Orkiestra Reprezentacyjna Policji), has since 1968, been the main musical organization in the law enforcement realm in Poland. The representative band cultivates the image of the Policja, cultivating the tradition and achievements of the agency. Until May 2014, the band, whose main tasks includes performing at ceremonial settings, fell under the command of the Warsaw Metropolitan Police Headquarters and operated under the name Warsaw Police Band. On 1 June 2014, the band became a unit of the Chief Commander's Office of the Policja, and was renamed to the representative band of the Policja.

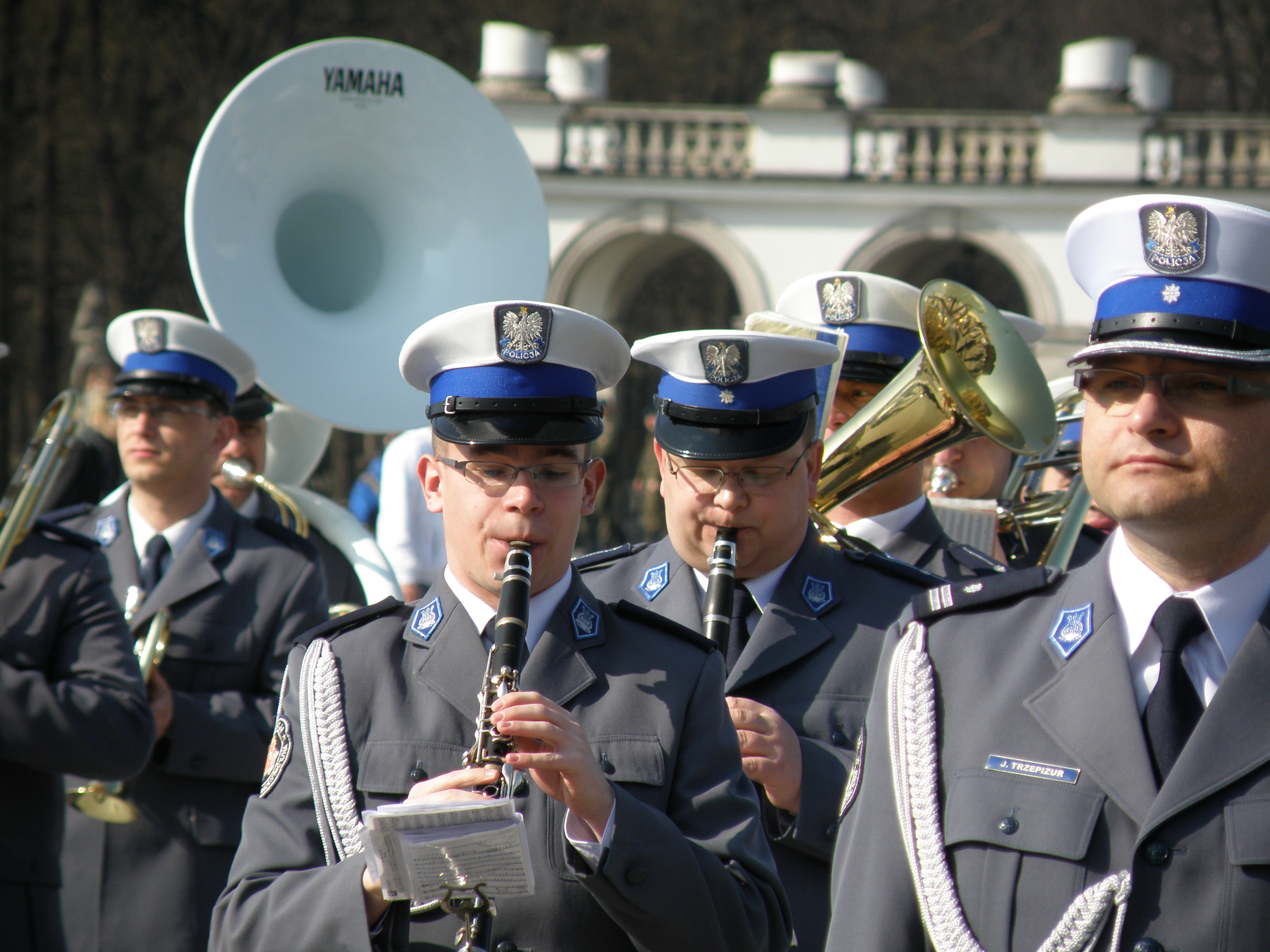
A group of musicians from the official Representative Band of the Policja in 2010.

The central band in Warsaw is one of three police bands, with the other two being based in Wrocław and Katowice.

The Free City of Danzig Police maintained a military style marching band, the Musikkorps, since its establishment on 9 April 1920 was formed. Led by composer Ernst Stieberitz, the police band became well known locally and regionally.

==== Russia ====
All Russian police bands fall under the command of the Russian MVD and are affiliated to the Military Band Service of the Armed Forces of Russia, with the Police Band Service of the Ministry of Internal Affairs of Russia being the police band service of the country. Russian police bands are relatively small in size compared to their Western counterparts, with the average size being 12 musicians. Police bands in the Russian Federation are divided into the following categories:

- Bands of Police Training and Educational Institutions of the Ministry of Internal Affairs
- Bands of Regional Police Directorates
- Bands of City Police Directorates
- Bands of Municipal Police Departments and District Police Commands

==== Ukraine ====
Police bands in Ukraine are affiliated with the National Police of Ukraine. Police bands are organized by the municipal police departments, rather than the regional police departments like their Russian counterparts. The chief police band is the Central Band of the National Police of Ukraine (Оркестр Національної поліції України), which is accompanied by directorate bands such as the City of Kyiv Police Band, the City of Lviv Police Band and the City of Odesa Police Band. The Khmelnitsky Police Band performs in the costumes of the armies of the Zaporozhian Cossacks in the 17th century. Police academies such as the Dnipropetrovsk State University of Internal Affairs also maintain their own brass bands. In the unrecognized Donetsk and Lugansk People's Republics in Eastern Ukraine, police bands fall under the direct command of the interior ministries of both of these regions. Specifically in the LPR, the Brass Band of the Ministry of Internal Affairs (formed on 22 May 2002) actively participates in more than 400 different regional, city and district events.

==== United Kingdom ====
Police bands in the United Kingdom usually follow the same military format laid out by the Royal Corps of Army Music. Many former British colonies have based their police band traditions on the British precedent.

The following are the police brass and reed bands currently in service:

- Cheshire Constabulary Band
- Cleveland Police Band
- Durham Constabulary Band
- Essex Police Band
- Band of the Gloucestershire Constabulary
- Greater Manchester Police Band
- Band of Hampshire Constabulary
- Humberside Police Concert Band
- Kent Police Band
- Merseyside Police Band
- Nottinghamshire Police Band
- South Wales Police Band
- West Mercia Constabulary Band
- West Midlands Police Brass Band
- West Yorkshire Police Band
- Wiltshire Police Band

Another notable police band was the London Metropolitan Police Service Band and Youth Corps of Drums. This specific band served the City of London before it was dissolved in 1997 after several years of reorganization. The Youth Corps of Drums of the MPS was established in 2015. Like the British Army, pipe bands are also maintained by individual police services. Notable pipe bands include: the Glasgow Police Pipe Band, Grampian Police Pipe Band and the Windsor Police Pipe Band.

=== Americas ===
==== Argentina ====
The Argentine Federal Police maintains a police band in its own ranks known as the Banda de Música de la Policía Federal (Music Band of the Federal Police), and is based at the PFA's headquarters in the Argentinian capital of Buenos Aires. Police bands are also sported in the provincial police departments in Buenos Aires, Santa Fe, Córdoba, and Tucumán.

==== Canada ====
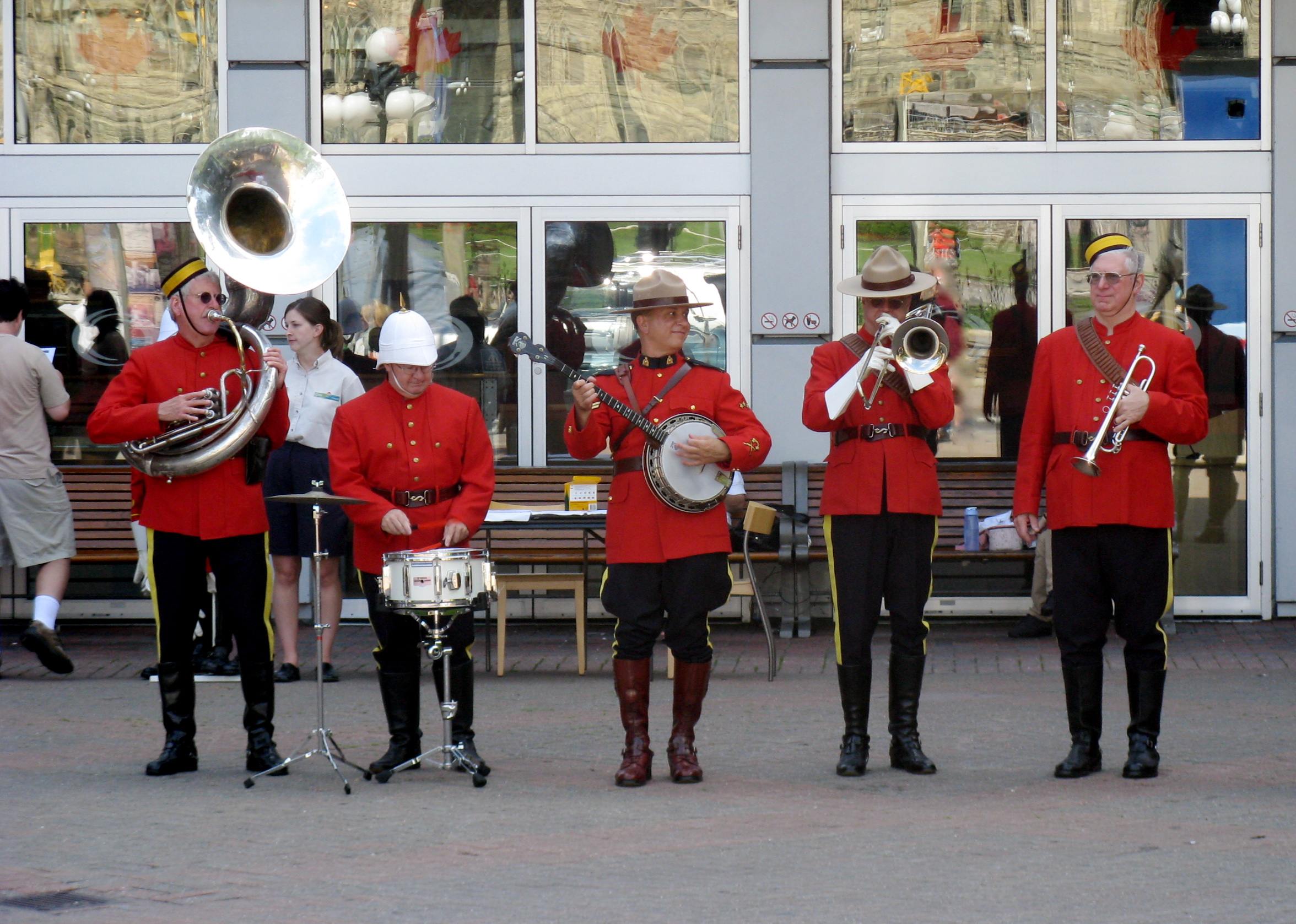
Although the official band of the RCMP has disbanded, several small RCMP veterans bands such as this one still remain.

The Royal Canadian Mounted Police Band (RCMP Band), which operated for more than 55 years until its disbandment in 1994 (Due to budget cuts), considered to be regarded today as one of and best and most notable professional bands assembled in Canada. There were various police bands in the RCMP that flourished during the 1950s, leading the Canadian government granting approval for a full-time central band to be created in December 1958, with headquarters in the capital of Ottawa. It was listed repeatedly as one of Canada's finest bands, which earned it the privilege of being able to play for dignitaries such as Mikhail Gorbachev and Queen Elizabeth II in 1990. Although it was an official regimental band, the members worked in the band as a secondary job apart from their actual jobs in the RCMP. Members of the band wore the RCMP's notable Red Serge and adopted in the band Canadian military discipline which was in part inspired by the British Army's experience with military and police bands. Appearances made by the band also included the Expo 86 and the Commonwealth Conference in Vancouver, as well as the Calgary Winter Olympics in 1988. To this day, many RCMP officers continue the original band's tradition by serving in smaller police bands in areas of RCMP operation.

Instead of brass and reed bands, the RCMP now sponsors eight regional pipe bands across the major cities of the 10 provinces. The following are the locations of the regional volunteer pipe bands:

- Halifax
- Moncton
- Montreal
- Ottawa
- Winnipeg
- Regina
- Edmonton
- Vancouver

These bands act as "garrison bands" for the provincial division. Today, only the RCMP Depot Band, which serves as the band of the RCMP Academy in Regina, Saskatchewan, is the sole police marching band of the RCMP and carries on the heritage of the disbanded bands.

Outside of the RCMP, pipe bands are also maintained in the various police departments throughout the country. Examples of this include but are not limited to: the Ottawa Police Service Pipe Band, the Ceremonial Band of the Waterloo Regional Police, the Vancouver Police Pipe Band and the Toronto Police Pipe Band. Other non-traditional volunteer bands such as Duty Calls (formed in 1997) from the London Police Service is also maintained. The Bridgewater Fire Department Band is the oldest fire department band in the country. The Ottawa Fire Services Band was named in February 2001 as the "Official Band of the City of Ottawa".

==== Paraguay ====
The 85 member Symphonic Band of the National Police of Paraguay (founded in 1912) serves as the official police band of the country. It consists of a Jazz Band, Symphonic Orchestra and a Concert Band.

Other bands in Paraguay include:

- Music Band of the Asuncion Police Academy
- Music Band of the General José Eduvigis Díaz Police Academy

==== Panama ====
The Panamanian Public Forces maintain a joint band service composed of the following police bands and drum and bugle corps:

- Band of the Panamanian National Police (established in September 1938)
- HQ Drum and Bugle Corps of the National Police
- Drum and Bugle Corps of the National Police Academy
- Youth Corps of Drums of the National Police Panama City Community Protection Unit
- Band and Drum and Bugle Corps of the Institutional Protection Service
- Band and Drum and Bugle Corps of the National Aeronaval Service
- Band and Drum and Bugle Corps of the National Border Service

==== Peru ====
The Band of the National Police of Peru was established in 1906 and has been named, by presidential decree, the "official band of the Peruvian state". It is the country's principal police band, which while serving as one of two presidential bands also serves as the ceremonial role for the National Police. In parades, it forms wearing the national flag colours in their service dress uniforms.

==== United States ====
Police bands in the United States are organized based on the different police departments in various cities, such as the NYPD Police Band. The oldest police band in the country is the Milwaukee Police Band from Wisconsin, where it serves as the official musical unit of the Milwaukee Police Department. Outside of the traditional marching band format, American police bands take various forms, such as a small ensemble or a large concert band. Examples of the non-traditional bands include Side by Side from the District of Columbia Metropolitan Police Department and the Los Angeles Police Department Concert Band. There are also a number of pipe bands. In the late 1800s, many Irish immigrants took law enforcement jobs in place of naturalized citizens who deemed them undesirable. Many undertook this professions to establish a part of Irish culture, bringing the tradition of playing bagpipes at parades, ceremonies, and funerals - and thus establishing the US police pipe band culture.

=== Oceania ===
==== Australia ====
Police bands in Australia are operated by the following agencies:

- New South Wales Police Force
- Northern Territory Police
- Queensland Police Service
- South Australia Police
- Victoria Police
- Western Australia Police
- Australian Federal Police

==== Samoa ====
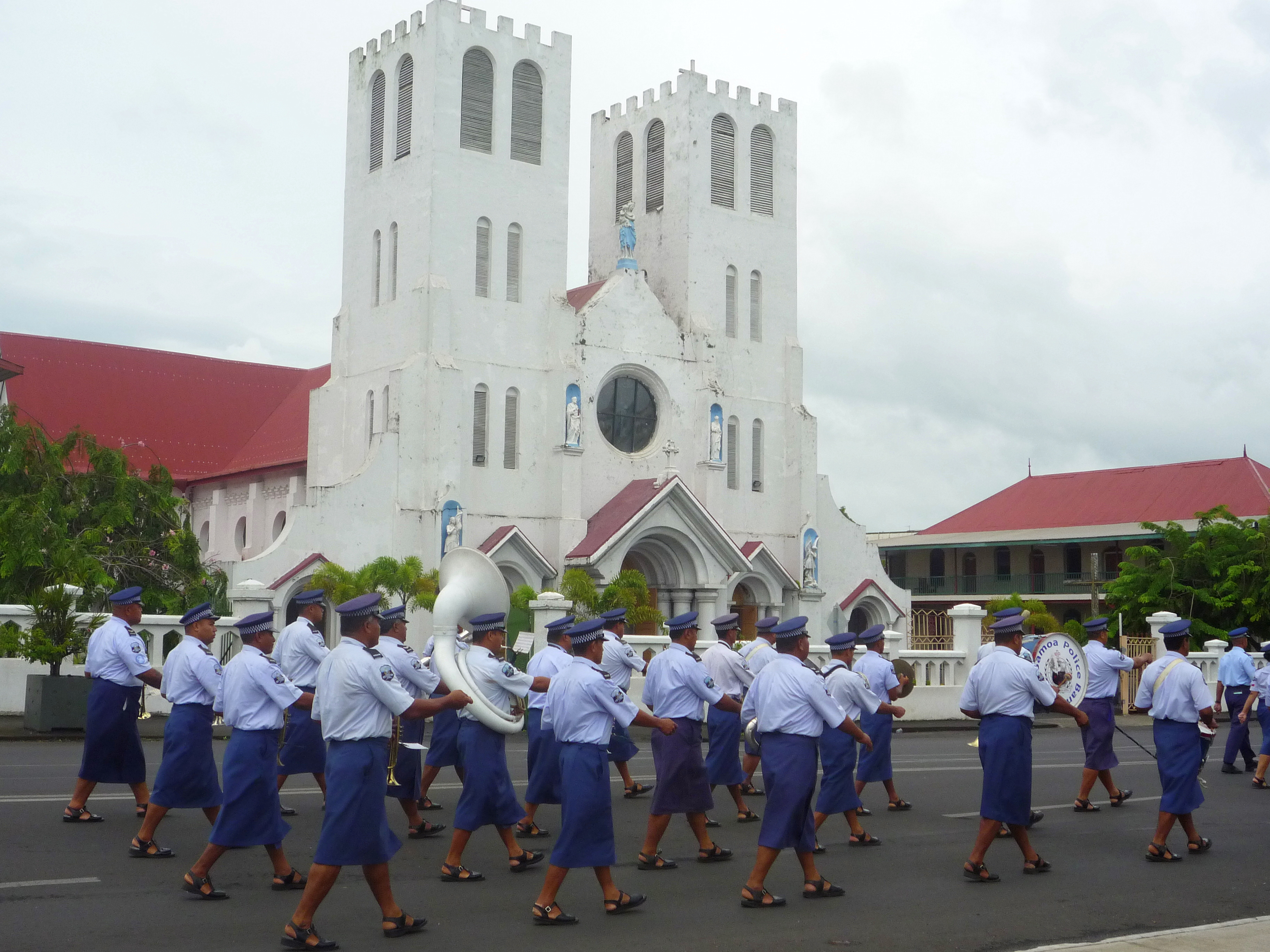
The Royal Samoan Police Band.

The Royal Samoan Police Band (RSPB) is a well-maintained brass band performing at special events such as the independence day anniversary. Every week-day morning, the Samoan Police Band march to the Samoan Government buildings and raise the Samoan flag. The band marches in traditional Samoan Lavalavas.

== See also ==
- Brass band
- Concert band
- Corps of Drums
- Drum and bugle corps
- Fanfare band
- Marching band
- NYPD Police Band
- Pipe band
- Military band
- Mounted band
- The Band's Visit – An Israeli movie depicting the Alexandria Ceremonial Police Orchestra in Alexandria, Egypt
