= Milwaukee Police Band =

Musical police unit in Milwaukee, Wisconsin

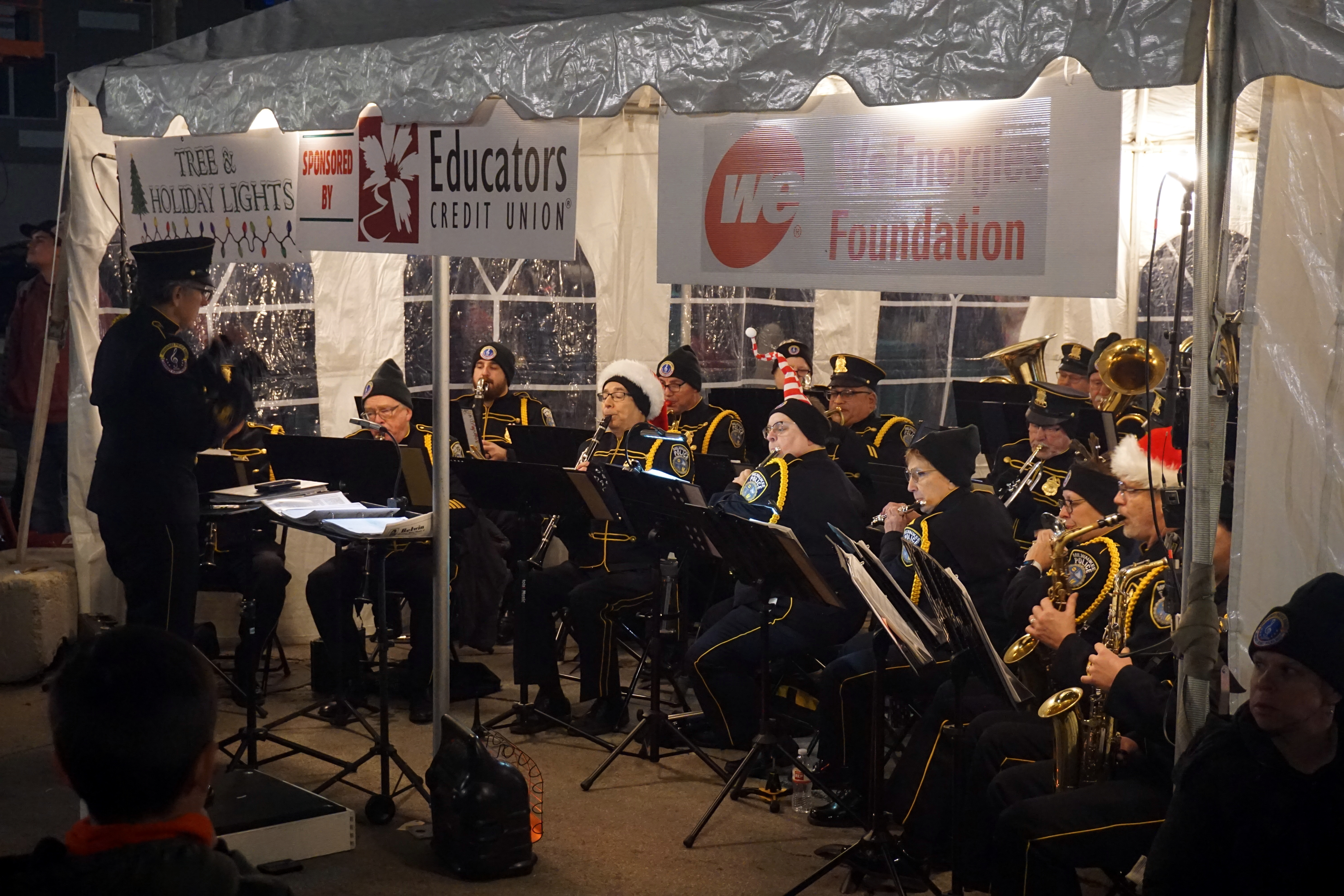
The Milwaukee Police Band performing at the 2022 Christmas in the Ward celebration in the Historic Third Ward

The Milwaukee Police Band is an American police band in Milwaukee, Wisconsin. It is the oldest currently active police band in the United States and serves as the official musical unit of the Milwaukee Police Department.

It is composed of both civilian and police personnel who volunteer to work with the band. The band is funded by the Milwaukee Police Athletic Association, due none of the city budget being available to fund its operations. The MPD band performs regularly at events such as Peace Officers Memorial Day, graduation ceremonies and other Civic functions.

== History ==
In the fall 1897, the Milwaukee Police Band became the first police ensemble to be formed in the United States, coming 13 years after the first police band one was formed in Australia. It was originally composed of a group of whistlers who worked in the MPD. 9 April 1898, 5 months after its founding, the band performed at its first concert to members of the MPD, playing the Star Spangled Banner, El Capitan and Yankee Doodle.

On 7 October 1922, the band met former United States Marine Band director John Philip Sousa at a train station and played for him when he visited Milwaukee to perform with the MPD Band alongside the Sousa Band at the Milwaukee Auditorium. It performed again with the band in mid-November 1923, during which Sousa presented the band with an American flag that included with streamers with Sousa's name embroidered. Under the direction of Robert O. Brunkhorst, the band became a regular feature on WISN (AM) radio, as well as other emerging radio stations in the region. The MPD Jazz Ensemble was formed in the 1940s to increase the diversity in music played by the band as it was a rising trend during that period. In October 1993, the Band was invited to appear at the Wisconsin Music Educators Association Music Conference in Madison, Wisconsin, during which they demonstrated their approach to establishing youth programs. In March 2000, the expansion of the MPD Band youth saw younger children being introduced included and paired with police officer-musicians who mentored and performed with the students.

== Performance history ==
In November 1924, the band made its first appearance at the municipal Christmas tree lighting ceremony, an event that it has continued to perform at annually. On 22 March 1925, the band joined the visiting NYPD Police Band in a benefit concert that saw an estimated 8,500 people in attendance at Milwaukee Auditorium. In the mid twenties, Howard B. Weeks, a local composer, wrote the Milwaukee Police Band March, the original manuscript of which is today located in the archives of the MPD Band at the Safety Academy. In July 1989, the band traveled to Minneapolis to march in the famous Aquatennial Parade, performing with the Bands of the Minneapolis Police Department, the Winnipeg Police Service and the Ontario Provincial Police. In coordination with Nick Contorno of the and program at Marquette University, a high school awards program was developed in 1990 to have area high school students perform with the Milwaukee Police Band in a concert at Varsity Theater in Marquette. On its centenary in July 1998, the band was invited to Washington D.C. to take apart in the National Independence Day Parade in Constitution Avenue. The band also traveled to Florida in April 2003 to perform at Walt Disney World's "Share a Dream Come True Parade".

== Directors ==
The following is a list of directors of the MPD Band since its 1897 establishment:

- William Stupenagel (1898-1902)
- Herman A. Zeitz (1902-1922)
- Charles Zeitz (1922-1923)
- Frederick W. Brunkhorst (1923-1940)
- Robert O. Brunkhorst (1940-1962)
- John Paulish (1962-1964)
- Perry F. Chalifoux (1964-1980)
- Dennis Benjamin (1980-1999)
- Karen Dubis/Bobby Lindsey (co-directors) (1999-2003)
- Karen Dubis (2003-Present)

All directors are appointed directly by the Chief of the MPD.

=== Robert O. Brunkhorst ===
On 2 February 1940, Robert O. Brunkhorst became the first director of the band from the civilian sector. A dentist by profession, he also conducted the Tripoli Shrine Band concurrently.

=== Karen Dubis ===
In June 2015, the longtime director of the band, Lieutenant Karen Dubis, retired from the MPD, continuing to lead the band as a civilian. She had been named as the band's first female band director in 2003. Dubis's nephew John is a soloist in the band.
