= Band of the National Police of Peru =

Ceremonial musical ensemble of the National Police of Peru

- Banda de la Policía Nacional del Perú
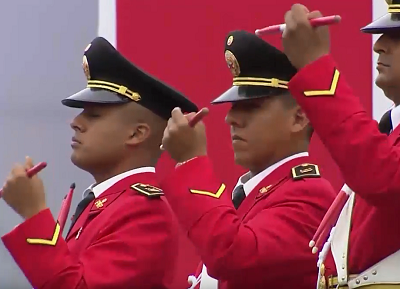
- Drummers of the Band of the National Police of Peru pictured circa 2017 in scarlet parade uniforms
- Active: 1906 – Present
- Country: Peru
- Branch: National Gendarmerie (1906–1988); National Police (1988–Present)
- Type: Police band
- Nickname: Official Band of the Peruvian State

Commanders
- Current commander: Miguel Angel Garbay Bravo

The Band of the National Police of Peru (Spanish: Banda de la Policía Nacional del Perú) is the ceremonial musical ensemble of the National Police of Peru. Considered the official band of the Peruvian state, it was activated in 1906. The band is notable for having the oldest music library in Peru.

== History ==
The Band of the National Police of Peru was established at the suggestion of President of Peru José Pardo y Barreda as the Band of the 1st Battalion of the Peruvian National Gendarmerie on August 6, 1906. It had an initial complement of 40 musicians. On July 28, 1921, the band was named the musical escort to the President of Peru and, in 1940, by decree of President Manuel Prado Ugarteche, it was named the "official band of the Peruvian state". The unification of Peru's three law enforcement forces in 1988 resulted in the creation of the National Police of Peru. With it came the merger of the musical ensembles of the Civil Guard and Investigative Police into that of the Gendarmerie and the redesignation of the Band of the 1st Battalion of the Peruvian National Gendarmerie as the Band of the National Police of Peru.

The band is notable for having the oldest music library in Peru.

== Performances ==
In 2017, a video of the band performing "Trucutu" went "viral" on Facebook in Peru, being viewed more than a quarter-million times. The same year, a video of the band performing a rendition of Puerto Rican pop hit "Despacito" rapidly generated more than 24 thousand "likes" on Facebook and – as of 2019 – had been viewed 6.5 million times on YouTube.
