= NYPD Pipes and Drums =

American pipe band

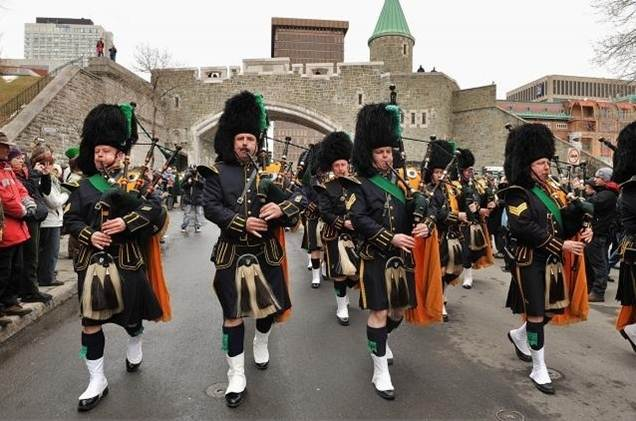
The NYPD Pipes and Drums at the 2010 Quebec City St-Patrick Parade

The NYPD Pipes and Drums is an American pipe band made up of active and retired police officers of the New York City Police Department (NYPD). It is associated with the Irish American Emerald Society and was formerly known as the Emerald Society's Pipe and Drum Band.

Formed in 1960, the NYPD Pipes and Drums was one of the first police pipe bands to form in the United States. Sergeant Finbar Devine was drum major from 1960 to 1995. It is an annual participant in the St. Patrick's Day parade in New York City and has played the Inaugural parade in Washington on three occasions. It has historically played for popes and presidents, and city officials. In 2017 and 2025 it performed at the United States presidential inauguration parade for President Donald Trump. In addition, the band has appeared on numerous television shows and movies including The Rosie O'Donnell Show, the Today Show and Late Night With David Letterman. The band also maintains a color guard. The bandmaster of the pipes and drums is lieutenant Daniel O’Grady.

The NYPD is regarded as one of the foremost American police department pipe and drum bands, the Pittsburgh Post-Gazette described the 95-member band in 2005 as the band that, "sets the standard nationwide."

In April 2002, the band hosted what the London Daily Telegraph described as "One of the largest invasions of pipers and drummers that the world has seen," as a 9/11 memorial. Pipe and drum bands from 26 countries numbering thousands of musicians marched down New York's Sixth Avenue.

In 1986, the NYPD Pipes and Drums decided not to participate in a commemoration of the 1981 Irish hunger strike by supporters of the Irish Republican Army (IRA) held in Bundoran in the south of County Donegal in Ulster, the northern province in Ireland, on August 31, 1986. Some band members attended privately.

== In popular culture ==
The NYPD Pipes and Drums appeared in the video made for the song "Fairytale of New York" by The Pogues as the lyrics refer to the non-existent "boys of the NYPD choir".

== See also ==
- NYPD Police Band
