= Public Security Police Force Band =

Public Security Police Force Band Portuguese: Banda de Música da Polícia de Segurança Pública de Macau Chinese: 澳门公安警察乐队 Àomén gōng'ān jǐngchá yuèduì

Agency overview
- Formed: April 1, 1951
- Employees: 44 officers

Jurisdictional structure
- Operations jurisdiction: Macau
- General nature: Civilian police

The Public Security Police Force Band (Abbreviation: PSP Band; Chinese: 澳门公安警察乐队, Portuguese: Banda de Música da Polícia de Segurança Pública de Macau) is a police band of the Public Security Police Force used for public ceremonies in the Macao Special Administrative Region of the People's Republic of China. It's composed of 44 police officers and supports all community events.

It is a military-style band with roots in its Portuguese past.

== History ==
In the 19th century, privately organized police and military bands were organized by the uniformed authorities of the Portuguese Empire who used Macau as a colony. In 1871, the Infantry Battalion Band gained more importance with its increasing schedule. In the later part of the century, police bands consisted of 40 musicians that included performers of various levels, buglers and assistant buglers, apprentice musicians and the conductors. This changed by the 1920s when these bands were decreased to just 26 personnel.

The PSP Band was created on 1 April 1951 under Luis Augusto de Matos Paletti as its director. It was composed of men who ranged from 17 to 20 years of age and had just finished their studies school at the Instituto Salesiano.

In 1958, Captain Dias da Silva ordered the band be expanded to 75 musicians. As a result of further restructuring of the PSP in early 1981, the band became a recipient of official musical training. In 1999, it was transferred from the authority of the Republic of Portugal to the People's Republic of China, as per the planned Transfer of sovereignty over Macau. During the events on the day of the transfer, the band took part in the lowering of the Portuguese flag as well as the performance of A Portuguesa for the final time.

In 2004, it was awarded the Dedication Medal (Medalha de Dedicação) by order of Chief Executive Edmund Ho. When Chinese Communist Party general secretary Xi Jinping visited Macau in 2019 for its 20th anniversary, the band performed for his arrival at Macau International Airport.
