= Vancouver Police Pipe Band =

Canadian pipe band

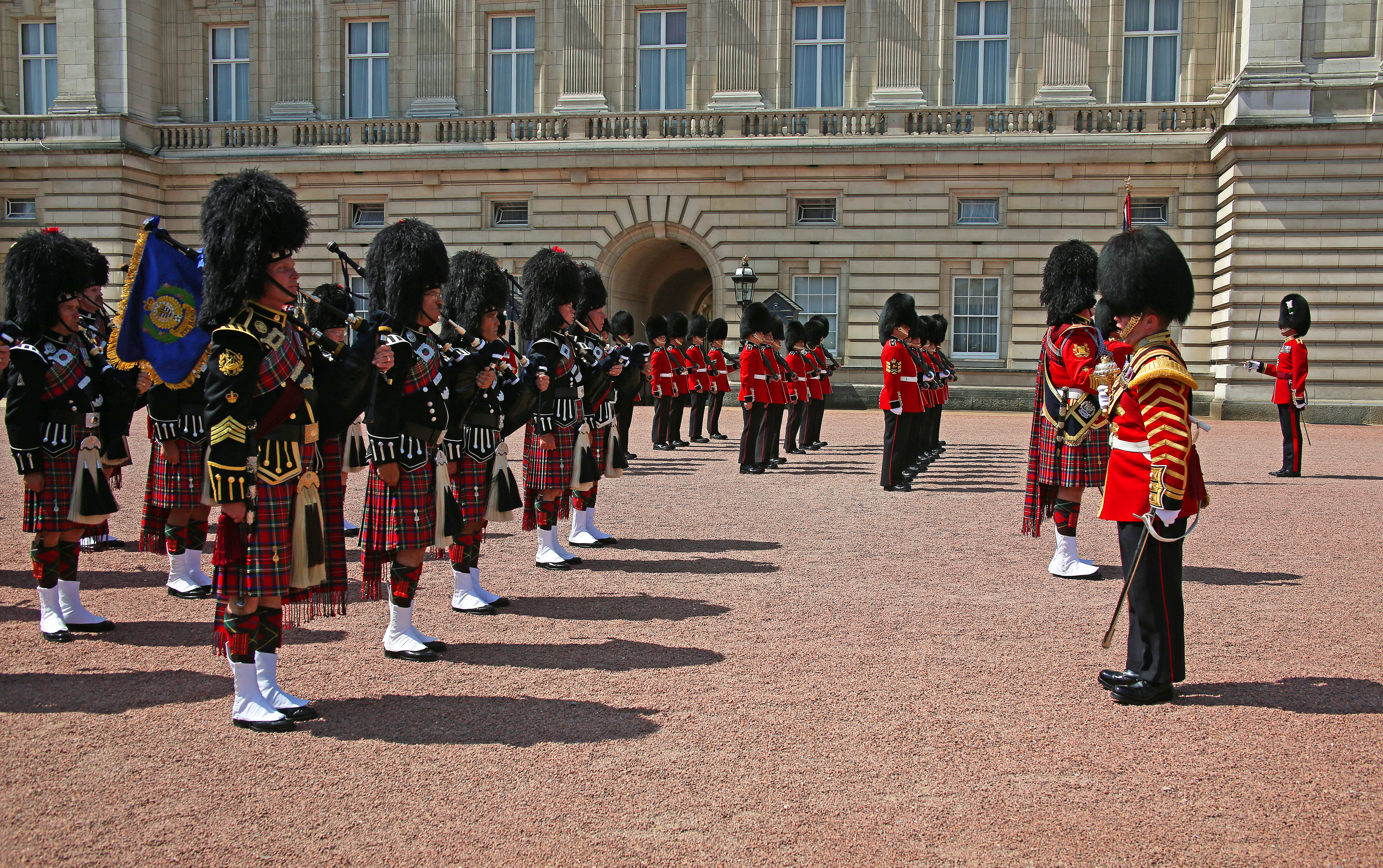
Members of the pipe band outside Buckingham Palace, June 2014.

The Vancouver Police Pipe Band is a Canadian pipe band based in Vancouver, British Columbia. It is the official police band of the Vancouver Police Department and is considered to be the official band of the City of Vancouver. It performs for all citywide, provincial, national and international events available to them. Like many pipe bands in the British and Canadian Army, they performs in full highland dress which includes a feather bonnet. It is the oldest non-military pipe band in British Columbia and ranks amongst the most senior police pipe bands in Canada. In its international visits, it has performed in countries such as Singapore, Japan, and the United States.

== History ==
=== Unit history ===
The band's foundation in June 1914 occurred at the opening of the new police station on Cordova Street, during which a handful of pipers within the department were mobilized to play for the opening ceremonies. As a result, Chief Constable Malcolm MacLennan authorized the formation of a departmental pipe band. At the time, it was one of a handful of police musical units in the world. In its history, it has recorded three compilations including The Pipe Band (1978), Music in Motion (1983), and 90 Years on the Beat (2004).

=== Performance timeline ===
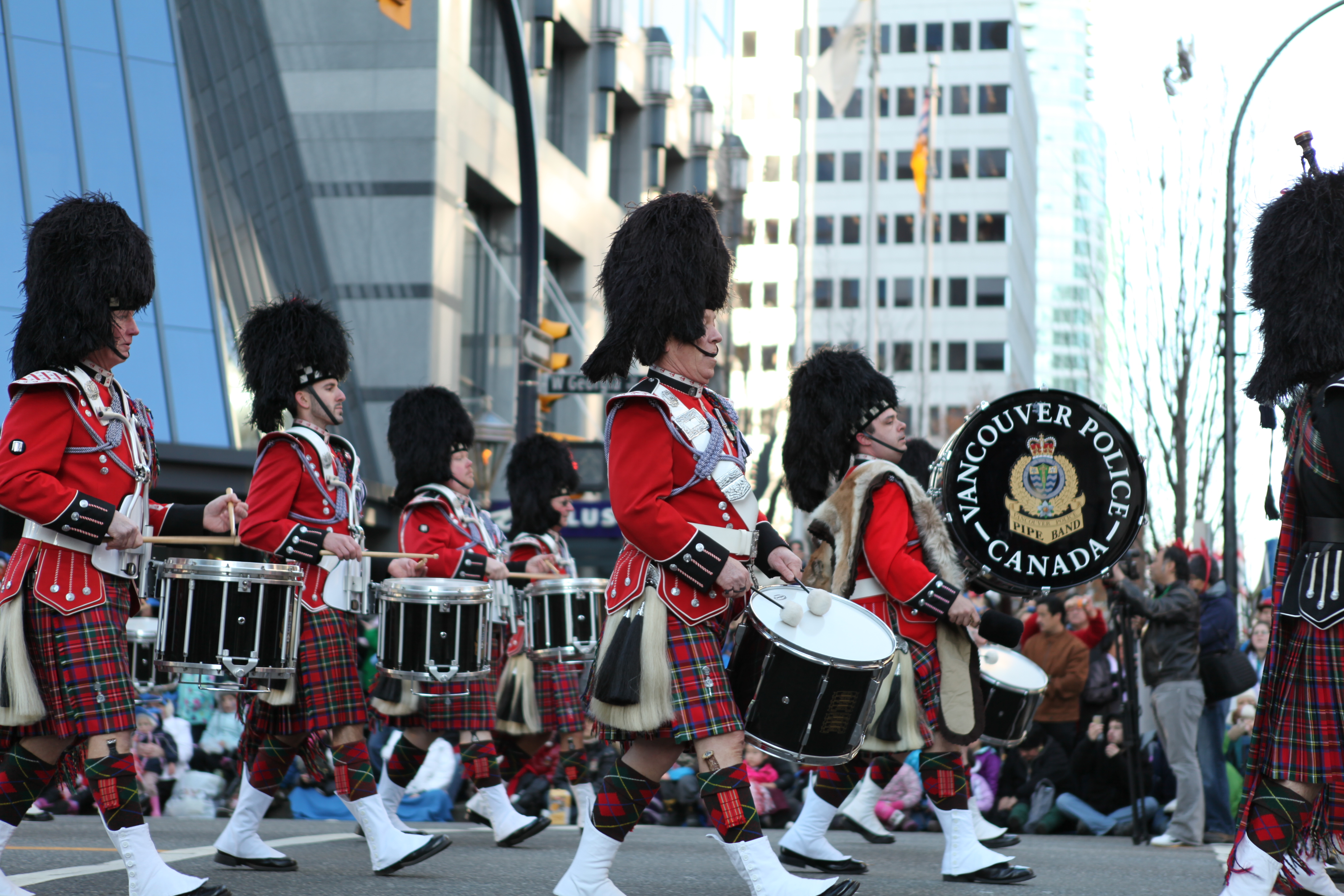
The band during the Rogers Santa Claus Parade in 2011.

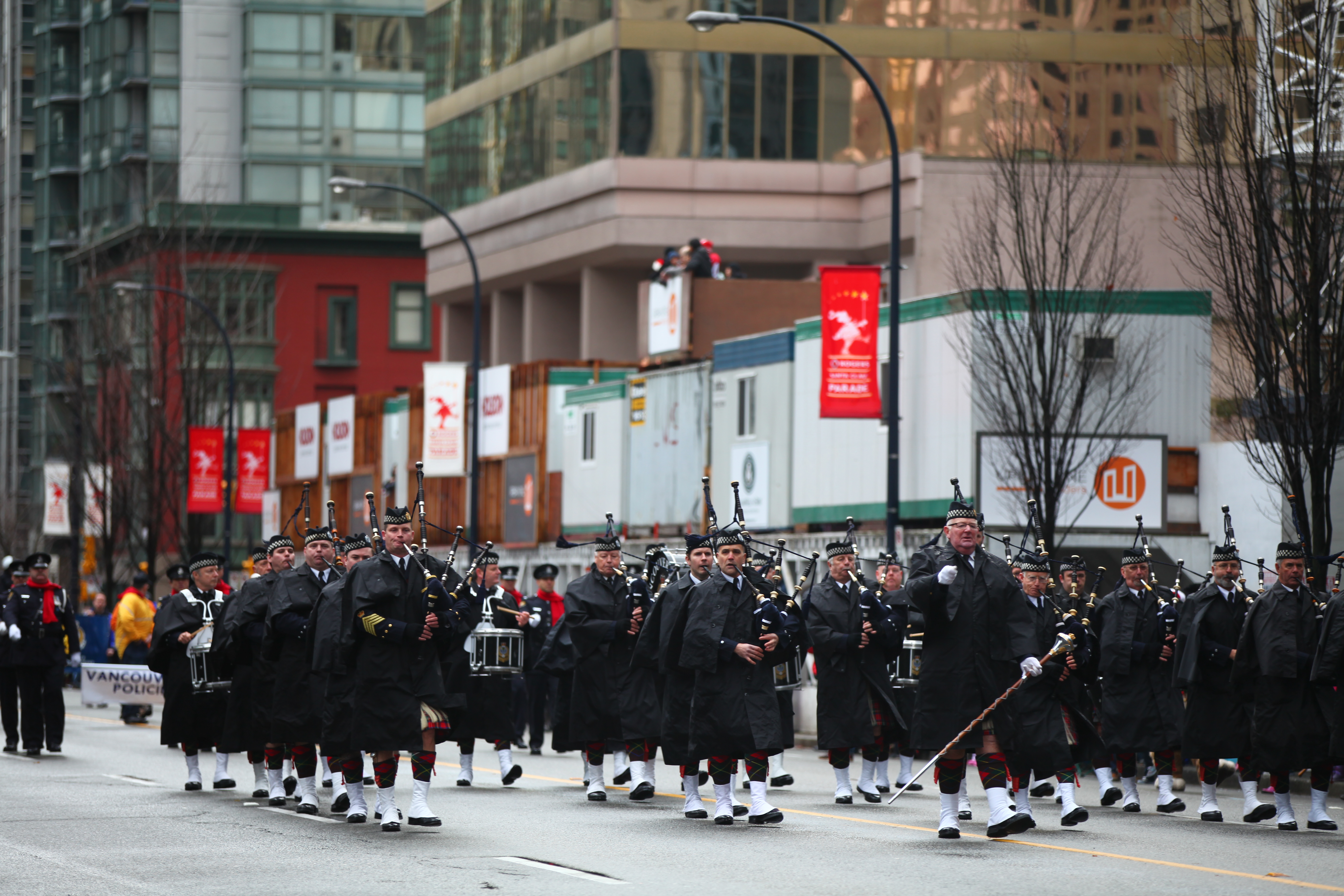
The band in police coats during parade in 2012.

- November 1963 – The band was touring Hawaii when the Assassination of John F. Kennedy occurred. In honour of the late President of the United States, they covered their drums in black cloth and joined a military band during a tribute the day after. As a show of appreciation, his successor Lyndon B. Johnson inspected the band during his visit to Vancouver the following year.
- February 1991 – The band paid a return visit to Honolulu, during which the then-Mayor Frank Fasi declared 15 February as "Vancouver Police Pipe Band Day". The visit was also used to pay tribute to the US troops and the troops of the international coalition who died during the Gulf War.
- September 2010 – The band took part in the Canadian Naval Centennial Tattoo in Pacific Coliseum celebrating the 100th anniversary of the Royal Canadian Navy. Among the bands it performed alongside included the Band of the Royal Marines, the Pipe Band of The Seaforth Highlanders of Canada and the Naden Band of Maritime Forces Pacific.
- May–June 2014 – The band stayed in London, the capital of the United Kingdom to take part in events in the city, including performing at the changing of the Queen's Guard at the forecourt Buckingham Palace as well as Windsor Palace. The visit took two years of coordination with the Household Division and was part of the celebrations of the band's centennial year. It was the first time a non-military pipe band had performed during the ceremony. During the guard mounting proceedings, the band drum major was accompanied by Maurice Brown of the Pipes and Drums of the 1st Battalion, Scots Guards. It also played at Royal Chelsea Hospital and the beating retreat on Horse Guards Parade. The visit saw a contingent that included a range of ages and even included 2 members from Washington state in the United States.
- 12-17 April 2019 – The band takes part in a tour of India to commemorate 100 years of the Jallianwala Bagh massacre. It was the Constable Sukhi Sunger, who was the first Sikh member of the band. During the tour, it visited Amritsar, Nawanshahar and Chandigarh. In Amritsar, the band performed at the Golden Temple (also known as Harmandir Sahib) and Guru Nanak Dev University. At a mall in Chandigarh, it performed Sare Jahan se Accha, which is an Urdu language patriotic song that translated means "Anthem of the People of Hindustan".

=== The Queens New Guard ===
In January 2018, a film covering the pipe band was released titled The Queens New Guard. Premiering at the Vancouver International Film Centre, it focused on the band's visit to London in 2014. The Vancouver Police Foundation made a large contribution to the creation of the documentary and was also funded through contributions on Kickstarter. Proceeds went to the Gordon Sinclair Fund, a charity set up in memory of band member Gordon Sinclair who was killed in 1955.

== Awards and honours ==
The following is a list of awards and honours by the band:

- Stewart Trophy (six times)
- Best Pipe Band Trophy at the Scottish Festival
- Silver Star (November 1963)

== Notable members ==
- Staff Sergeant Jim McWilliams – A former Pipe Major of the band who was also associated with the Calgary Boy Scout Pipe Band and the Pipes and Drums of The North Saskatchewan Regiment
- Hugh Peden – Member of the band in from 1990 up until he became acting director in early 2006. He would later become pipe major of the RCMP "E" Division Pipe Band.
- Andrew Perrie – Pipe Major from 1967 to 1984 and band member from 1951 to 2011.
