= Quebec City St-Patrick Parade =

Coordinates: 46.8037°N 71.2259°W

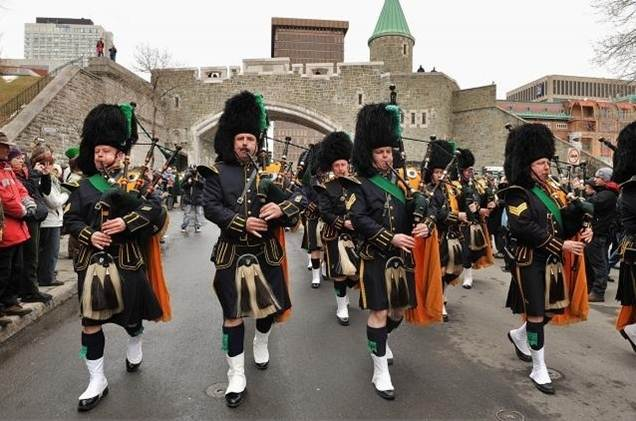
The returning edition of 2010 with the NYPD Pipes and Drums.

The Québec City St-Patrick's Day Parade is the main event celebrating Saint Patrick's Day in Quebec City, Quebec, Canada. The event returned in 2010 after 84 years' absence.

== History ==
=== Origins (1837–1926) ===
Canada's first-known celebration of St. Patrick's Day was held in Québec City in 1765 in the Sun Tavern on St. John Street (today known as rue St-Jean). It was hosted by Protestant landlord Miles Prentice, a former soldier (and believed to be an Irishman), and by the former Provost-Marshal in General Wolfe's army.

Québec City's first parade was held in 1837, four years after the opening of the Irish community's first church, St. Patrick's, on rue McMahon. The parade attracted a large number of people and quickly became a major annual event in Québec City. In 1916, the parade was suspended due to World War I, resuming in 1921. In 1928, two years after the last parade, the Québec Chronicle Telegraph acknowledged with regret that the festivity had begun its passage into history. However, the Cadets of St. Patrick's High School held modest parades until the 1940s.

Grand Marshal Bruce Kirkwood in 2025

=== The return of the parade (2010– ) ===
In 2009, a committee was created to bring back the tradition of the parade to the city. With the support of the population, several organisations and the Québec City administration, the St. Patrick's Day parade returned to the streets of Québec on March 13, 2010, for the first time in over 84 years. For the occasion, a portion of the NYPD Pipes and Drums were present as special guests. The event was considered to be a success across the board, drawing over 40,000 people into the streets of Vieux-Québec. The event has continued in the years since then.

== See also ==
- Saint Patrick
