= Fanfare Band of the Royal Marechaussee =

Fanfare Band of the Royal Marechaussee Trompetterkorps der Koninklijke Marechaussee
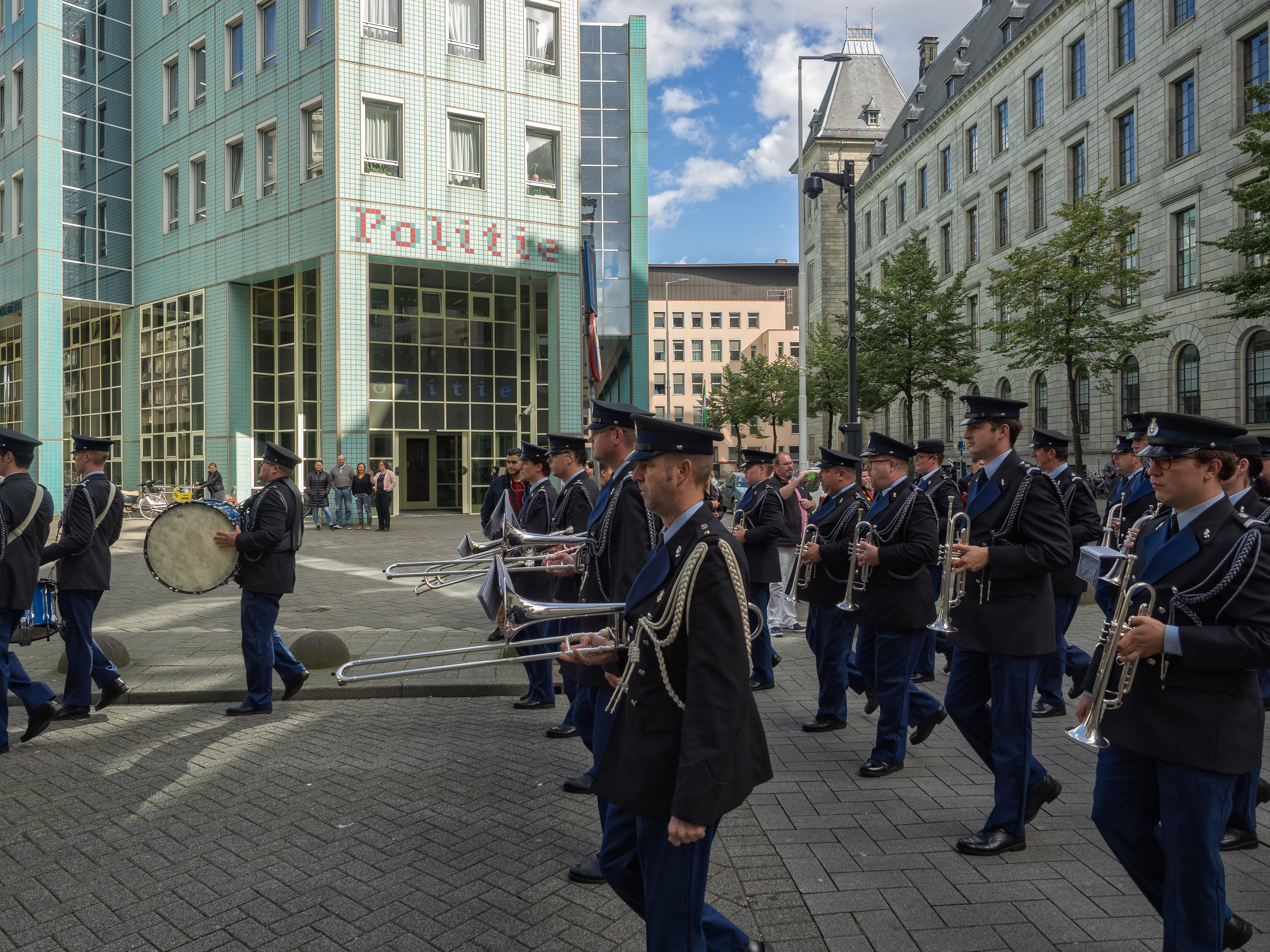
- The band in September 2015.

Background information
- Years active: 1950-present

The Fanfare Band of the Royal Marechaussee (Dutch: Trompetterkorps der Koninklijke Marechaussee, TkKMar) is a 60-member fanfare band which serves as the official ensemble of the Dutch Royal Marechaussee. It is currently led by Captain Peter Kleine Schaars. It is currently based in Apeldoorn (specifically William III Barracks). Being a professional military band representing a service branch of the Dutch Armed Forces, it consists of many different ensembles, including a saxophone quartet, and a percussion section. Also, it maintains a drum and bugle corps component.

== Description ==
It was founded on 12 April 1950 as a drum and bugle corps consisting of an instrumental line-up of drums and fanfare trumpets that were donated by residents of the municipality of Apeldoorn in the Gelderland. In 1954, it changed its name to "Tamboerkorps". This was reversed in 1982 when it reverted to its original structure. From 1992 to 2001, TkKMar operated as a brass band. Saxophones were added to the band's instrumentation in 2005, making it have a fanfare orchestra style image. On 1 January 2019, the name of the band was changed from Orchestra Koninklijke Marechaussee (Band of Her Majesty's Royal Netherlands Military Police) to the Trompetterkorps der Koninklijke Marechaussee (Fanfare Brass Band of His Majesty's Royal Marechaussee).

It performs alongside other military bands such at events of state and royal importance such Koningsdag and Bevrijdingsdag. Being a dual military band and police band, it participates in international military tattoos and police festivals on behalf of the Royal Marechaussee, visiting countries Australia (2006 Adelaide Police Tattoo), Poland, Suriname, Finland (2018 Hamina Tattoo), Russia, Canada, Denmark, the United Kingdom and South Africa.

=== Uniforms ===
The band performs in the uniform of the drum corps from before 1975: A blue tunic with a high collar and shoulder knot. For special occasions, the band uniform includes a Busby and a Basket-hilted sword, the traditional drum and bugle section also wears the same uniform but with a peaked cap instead for headdress.

== Music directors ==
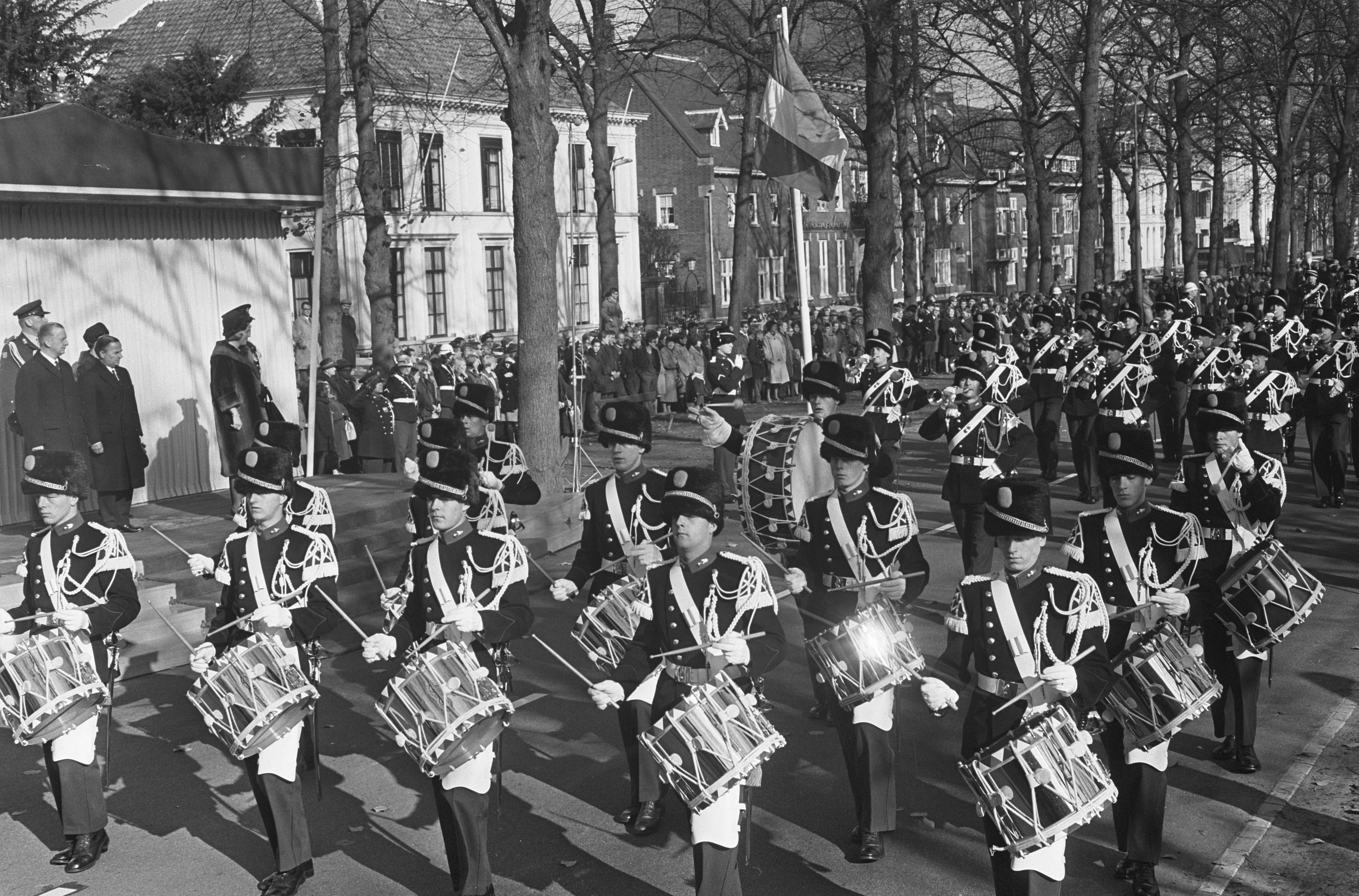
The TkKMar on the Maliebaan in Utrecht during the 150th anniversary of the Royal Marechaussee in 1964.

- 1950-1974: A. Boer
- 1974-1977: C. Braafhart
- 1977-1991: Warrant Officer A. J. Mikuska
- 1991-1992: Sergeant Major J. Pesch
- 1992-2006: Captain S. Kleinjan
- 2006-2017: Captain Erik Janssen
- 1 May 2017-Present: Captain Peter Kleine Schaars
