= Mobile Gendarmerie Music Band =

French military band

Mobile Gendarmerie Music Band Musique de la gendarmerie mobile
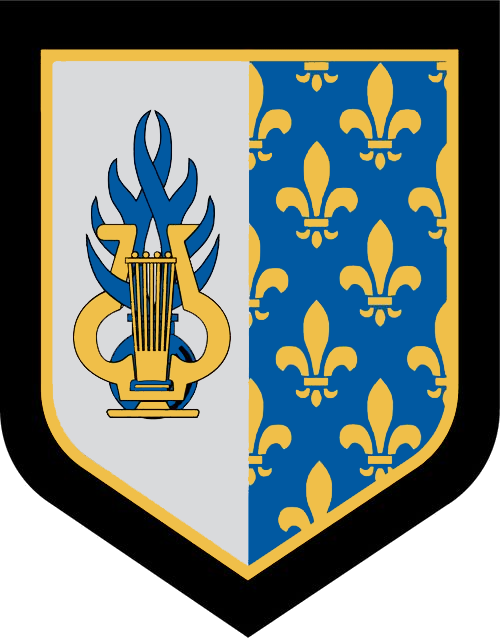
- Active: 1934-present
- Country: France
- Allegiance: Ministry of the Armed Forces; Minister of the Interior
- Branch: Mobile Gendarmerie
- Part of: Groupement II/1 de Gendarmerie mobile
- Garrison/HQ: Maisons-Alfort

The Mobile Gendarmerie Music Band (French: Musique de la gendarmerie mobile) is a Military band unit of the Mobile Gendarmerie. It is placed under the authority of the Military governor of Paris. In this capacity, it accompanies ceremonies in the capital on the national level. It is a part of the National Gendarmerie and is one of two military bands in the service branch, with the other being the French Republican Guard Band.

It was first created in 1934, when at the time, the armed forces was led by Maxime Weygand and the Parisian military governor was Henri Gouraud. It was converted into an infantry Band in the Republican Guard in 1945, and took its current name in 1974. Since July 2007, the band has been stationed in Maisons-Alfort.

== Activities ==
Her missions also include concerts, festivals and major cultural events to which she is regularly invited. In addition, she participates in parades and parades for the benefit of the National Gendarmerie.

The concert band and string orchestra specifically perform either separately or as a combined ensemble during state dinners, or government organized concerts.

These activities are supported by the different ensembles of the band:

- Fanfare band
- Corps of drums
- Concert Band
- Reed Ensemble
- String Ensemble
- Saxophone Quartet
- Trombones Quintet

== See also ==
- National Gendarmerie
- Mobile Gendarmerie
- Military governor of Paris
- French Foreign Legion Music Band (MLE)
- French Republican Guard Band
- Military band
