= Ceremonial Band of the Waterloo Regional Police =

The Ceremonial Band of the Waterloo Regional Police is a Canadian police band based in Waterloo, Ontario. It was founded in 1977 when the WRPS was four years old. Since 2010, the band has partnered with local high schools and post-secondary institutions in the Waterloo-Oxford area. It is currently the only military-style brass and reed band that is attached to a Canadian police service.

Being an organizational band for the community, it participates in local community functions and Parades, as well as travels outside the region to attend musical tattoos and concerts. It also takes responsibility for providing musical accompaniment for the ceremonial functions of the WRPS, including memorials and funerals of fallen police officers, award ceremonies and ceremonial inspections. Aside from the actual 70 member band, it also contains an 8-member colour guard and a 4-member drumline.

The types of events the band performs at include the following examples:

- Remembrance Day events
- Calgary Stampede
- Police Officers Memorial Service on Parliament Hill
- Kitchener–Waterloo Oktoberfest
- Kitchener-Waterloo Thanksgiving Day Parade (the largest parade it participates in)
- Kitchener Santa Claus Parade

== Notable members ==
- Brian J. Smith – Former band assistant director
- Robin Reid Habermehl – musical director of the band and former vocalist and jazz saxophonist in the Central Band of the Canadian Armed Forces
- Don McDougall – The assistant director of the band since 2011
