= Windsor Castle Royal Tattoo =

Coordinates: 51°29′0″N 00°36′15″W

The Finale of the Windsor Tattoo 2008

The Windsor Castle Royal Tattoo was an annual military tattoo held in the private grounds of Windsor Castle by permission of Queen Elizabeth II, from 2008 to 2011. The event's proceeds went to the Royal British Legion to help support recently returned troops from battle.

Military re-enactment in the shadow of Windsor Castle

The Tattoo website described itself as:

...a celebration of the capabilities of today’s forces through music and action. It is a tri-service event and has a packed programme of international and British military acts, massed bands, pipes and drums, modern military re-enactments and a fantastic finale.....The Tattoo tells the story of modern life in each of the services (the Army, the Royal Air Force and the Royal Navy) and large screens show footage from each of the services in action in war zones, taking the audience to the current operational environment.

The Windsor Tattoo was similar to the Royal Tournament, the world's largest military tattoo which was axed by the British Government in 1999. In 2009 the Tattoo saw the return of the Royal Navy Field Gun Race 10 years after it was laid to rest along with the Royal Tournament.
