= Royal Edinburgh Military Tattoo =

Annual series of military tattoos

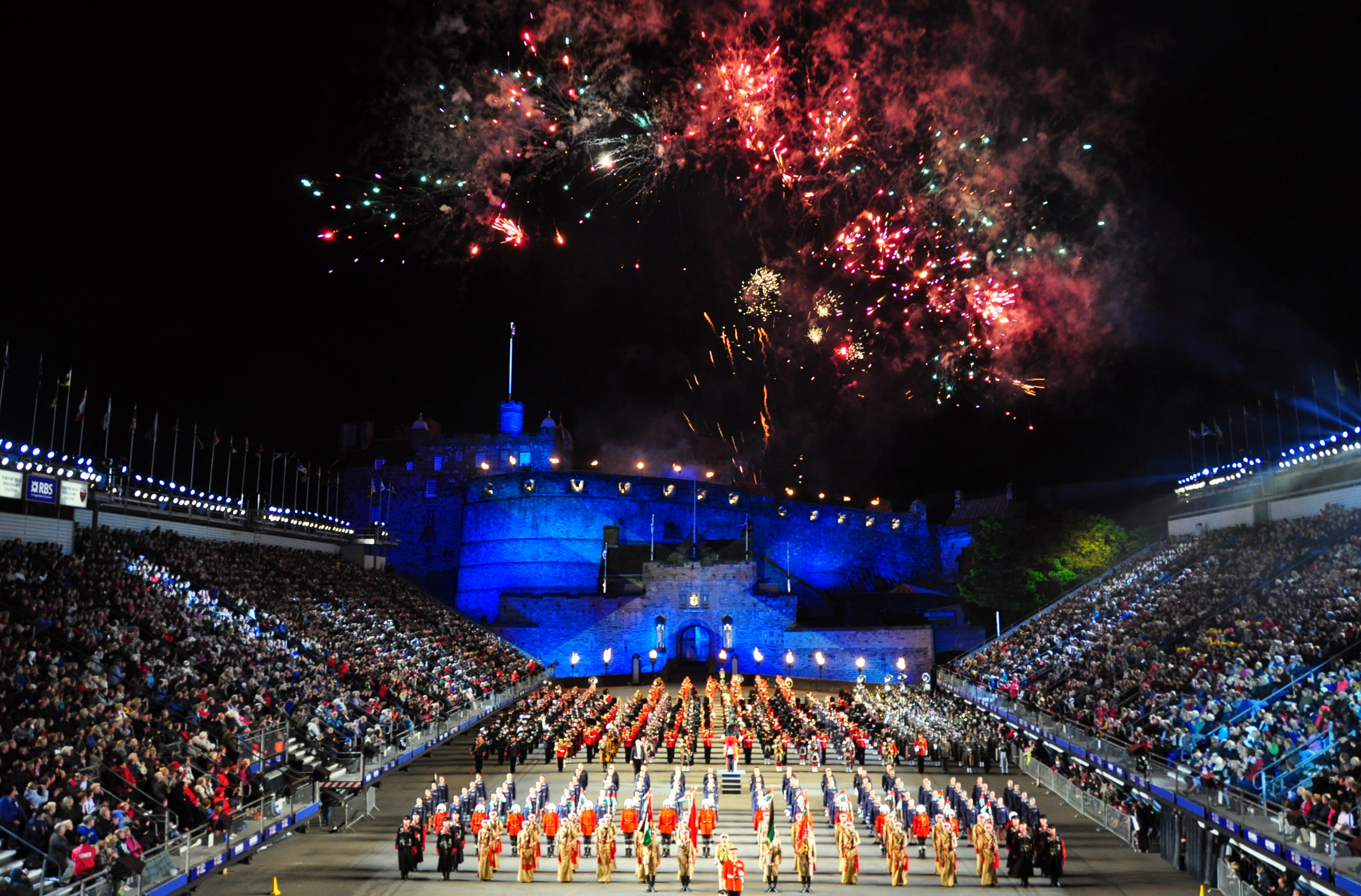
- The 2010 Edinburgh Military Tattoo
- Status: Active
- Genre: Military tattoo
- Frequency: Annual
- Venue: Ross Bandstand, Princes Street Gardens (1949); Esplanade of Edinburgh Castle (since 1950)
- Country: United Kingdom
- Founded: 1949; 77 years ago

The Royal Edinburgh Military Tattoo is an annual series of military tattoos performed by British Armed Forces, Commonwealth and international military bands, and artistic performance teams on the Esplanade of Edinburgh Castle in the capital of Scotland. The event is held each August as one of the Edinburgh Festivals.

== History and etymology ==
=== Etymology ===
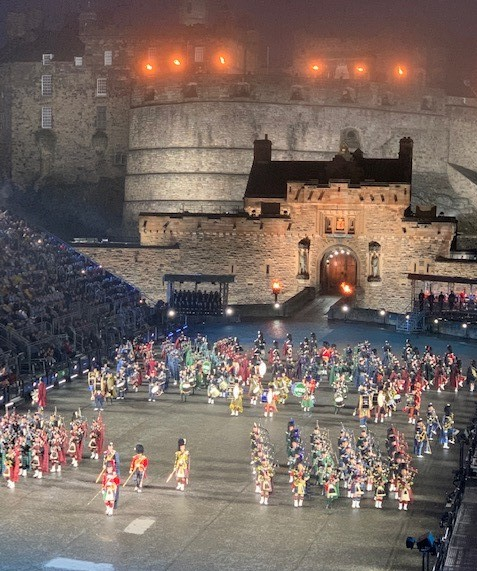
The 2022 Edinburgh Military Tattoo pipes and drums

The term tattoo derives from a 17th-century Dutch phrase doe den tap toe ("turn off the tap") a signal to tavern owners each night, played by a regiment's Corps of Drums, to turn off the taps of their ale kegs so that the soldiers would retire to their billeted lodgings at a reasonable hour. With the establishment of modern barracks and full military bands later in the 18th century, the term "tattoo" was used to describe the last duty call of the day, as well as a ceremonial form of evening entertainment performed by military musicians.

=== Origins ===
The first public military tattoo in Edinburgh was entitled "Something About a Soldier" and took place in 1949 at the Ross Bandstand in the Princes Street Gardens. The first official Edinburgh Military Tattoo, with eight items in the programme, was held in 1950. It drew some 6,000 spectators seated in simple bench and scaffold structures around the north, south, and east sides of the Edinburgh Castle esplanade. In 2018, the stands were able to accommodate a nightly audience of 8,800, allowing 220,000 to watch the multiple live performances.

=== Seating expansion ===
Since the 1970s, on average, just over 220,000 people see the Tattoo live on the esplanade of Edinburgh Castle each year (8,800 each evening). Before the cancellation of the 2020 and 2021 editions due to the global COVID-19 pandemic, the Tattoo had sold out for 22 consecutive seasons beginning in 1998. According to a submission by the Tattoo to the Scottish Parliament's Digital, Culture, Media and Sport Committee, 2020 ticket sales indicated that 30% of the audience were from Scotland and 32% from the rest of the United Kingdom. The remaining 38% were international visitors from 69 countries.

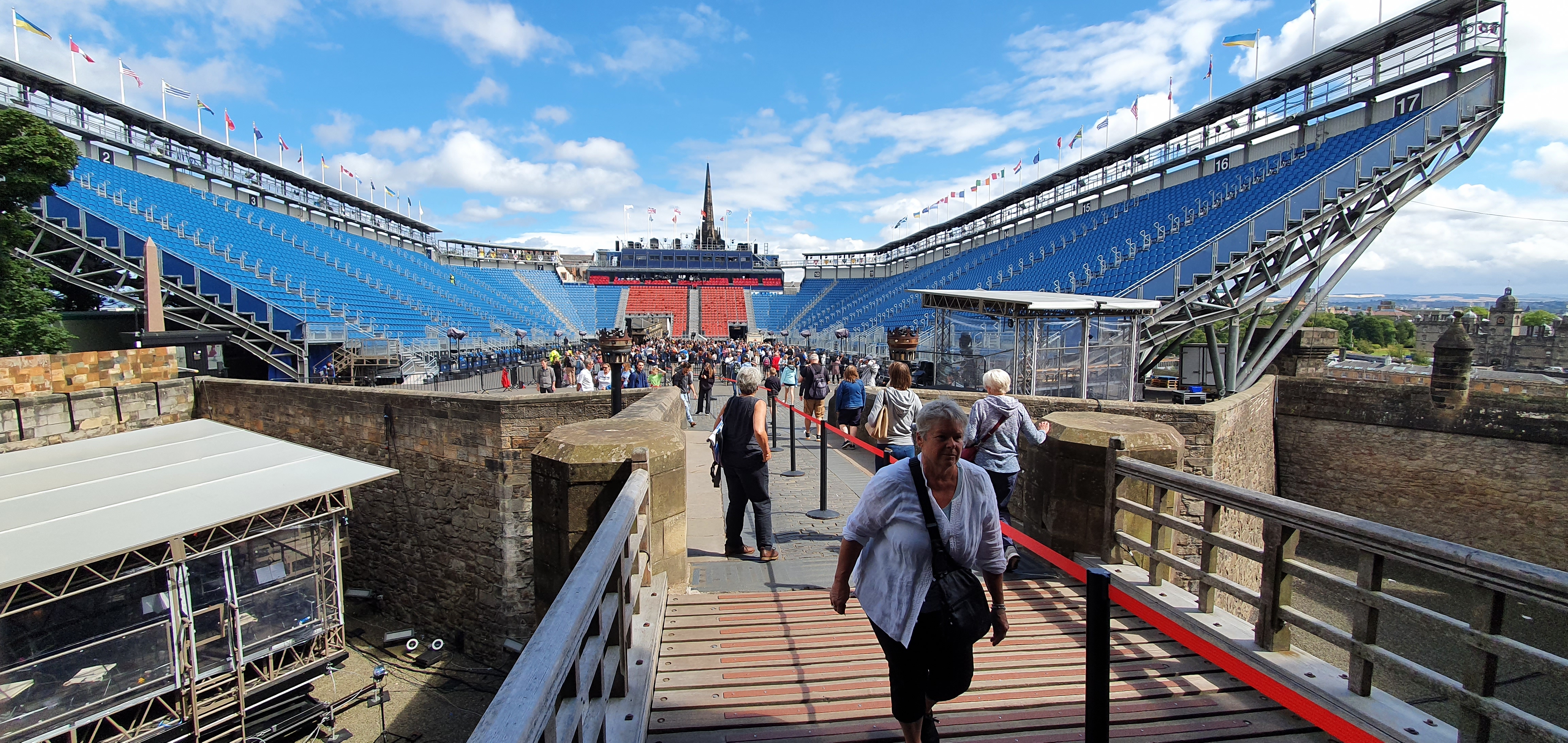
Interior view of the stands set up for the 2022 Tattoo

The temporary grandstands on the castle esplanade, used in 2018, had a capacity of 8,800. New £16 million spectator stands and corporate hospitality boxes came into use in 2011. The new temporary stands reduced the time taken to erect and dismantle them from the original two months to one month, allowing the esplanade to host events at other times of the year.

== Performances ==
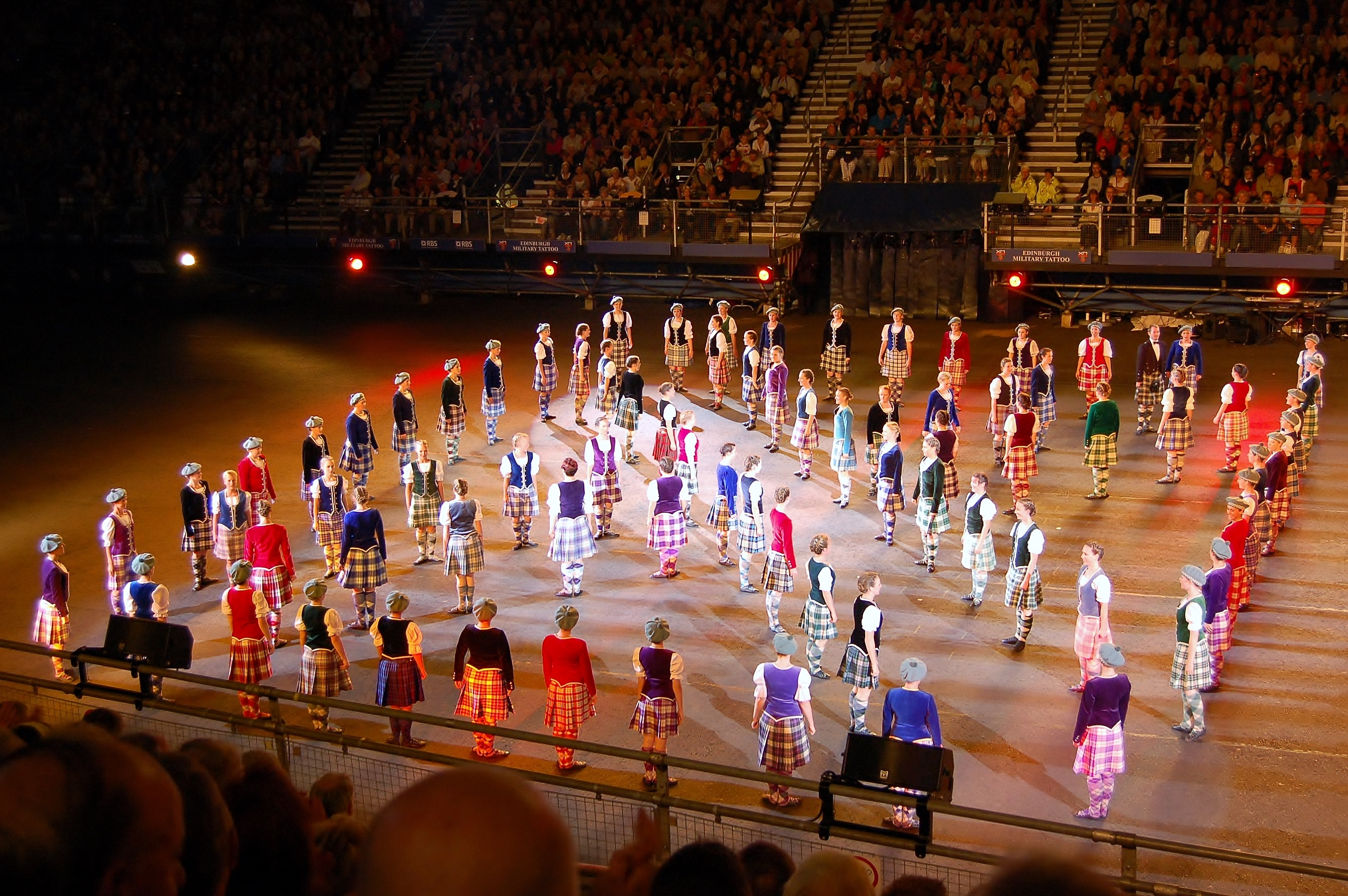
The 2006 Edinburgh Military Tattoo highland dancers forming a Saltire

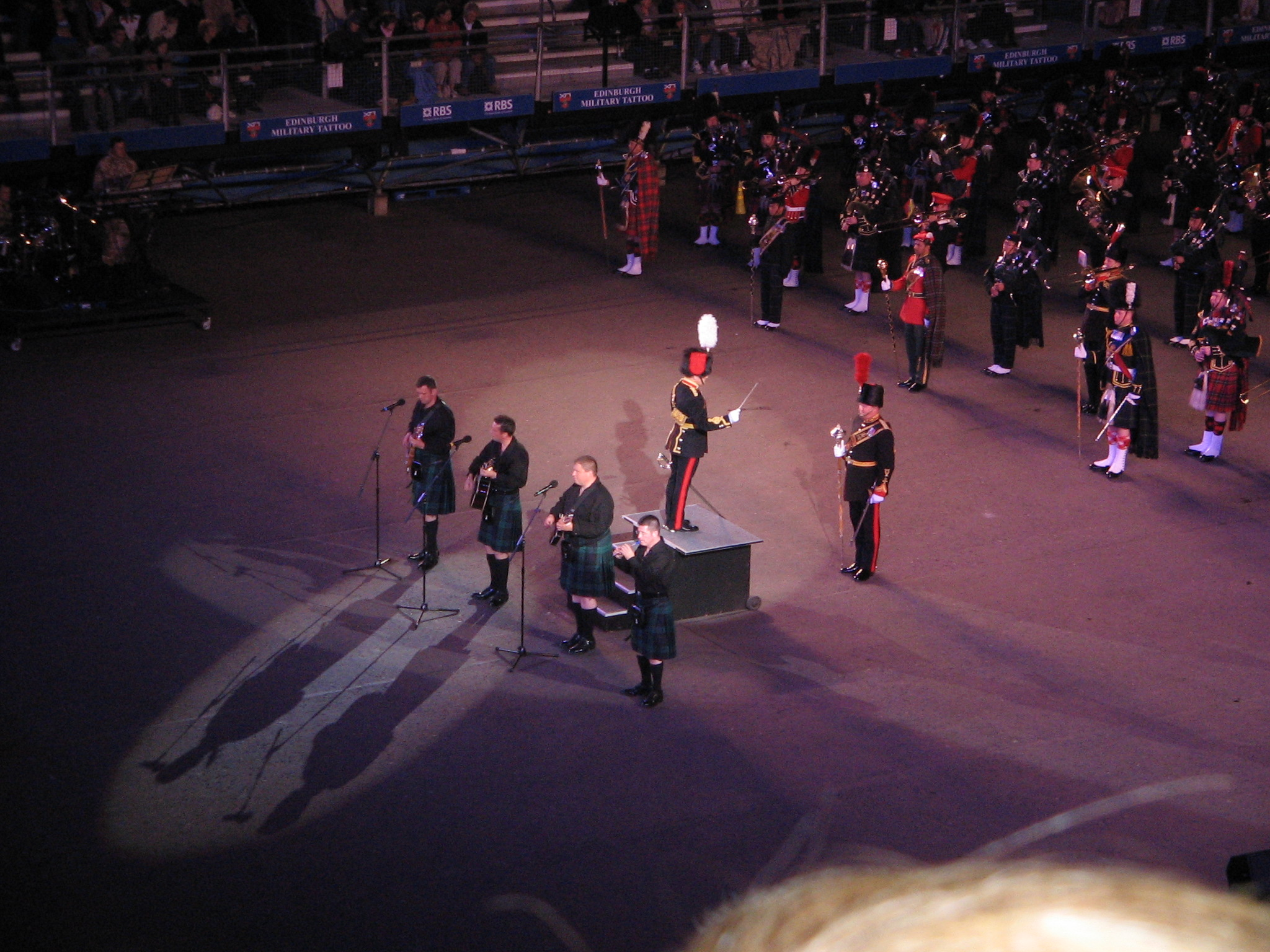
The Bonnie Lass o' Fyvie being performed at the Edinburgh Military Tattoo 2007

The Tattoo performance takes place every weekday evening and twice on Saturdays throughout August and, to date, has only been cancelled once due to inclement weather, on August 4, 2025 when Storm Floris hit the United Kingdom. However, in 2020 and 2021 the performances were cancelled due to the COVID-19 pandemic. In 2010 the event became the Royal Edinburgh Military Tattoo after HM Queen Elizabeth awarded the Royal title in celebration of its six decades of existence. Since 2012, each performance has included a fireworks display. From 2005 to 2015, a son et lumière element projected on to the facade of the Castle. In 2016, the projection technology on the castle was upgraded to utilize modern projection mapping technology. In 2018, laser technology was used for the first time.

Since 2004, the Edinburgh Military Tattoo has also held free abridged performances at the Ross Bandstand in Princes Street Gardens, entitled "Taste of the Tattoo", and as of 2008 also in George Square in Glasgow. The Edinburgh Military Tattoo has also toured overseas, visiting New Zealand in 2000 as part of the Tattoo's 50th anniversary celebrations. It visited Australia in 2005 and returned to the Sydney Football Stadium in February 2010 as part of the Tattoo's 60th anniversary celebrations. In February 2016 the Tattoo sold 240,000 tickets when it was staged in Wellington, New Zealand and Melbourne Australia. The performance was held at ANZ Stadium, Sydney in October 2019. There were also plans to take the show to China in 2020, with performances in Shanghai, Beijing, and Guangzhou. Due to the COVID-19 pandemic these plans were suspended.

In 2025, the Tattoo celebrated its 75th anniversary with a special performance honouring the 'Heroes who made us.'

=== International exposure ===
In 2018 the Tattoo was planned to be televised to 40 countries allowing an estimated 100–300 million people see the event on television worldwide. In Britain the BBC broadcasts the event annually, with commentary in 2009 and 2010 provided by BBC Radio Scotland presenter Iain Anderson. Bill Paterson provided commentary from 2011 to 2019; before 2009 Tom Fleming commentated, not missing a year between 1966 and 2008.

In Australia the Australian Broadcasting Corporation (ABC) traditionally telecasts the Tattoo on the evening of New Year's Eve, although in a break with tradition, the 2006 Tattoo was broadcast a day earlier on 30 December, the 2007 Tattoo was broadcast even earlier on Christmas Eve, and the 2009 Tattoo was broadcast two days after New Year's Eve on 2 January 2010. These changes were made so the ABC could expand its news coverage of local New Year celebrations.

=== Charitable activities ===
The Tattoo is run for charitable causes and in 2017 it was estimated that over the years has given £10 million to the arts, military and civilian charities and organisations, such as the Army Benevolent Fund. The event also generates up to £100 million in revenue for Edinburgh's economy annually, according to estimates by the Tattoo itself.

=== Magazine ===
Launched in 2002, the official magazine of the Edinburgh Military Tattoo, Salute, is distributed free to sponsors, friends of the Tattoo, and visiting performers.

=== Performance structure ===
Each performance begins with a fanfare, usually composed for that year's show. The Massed Pipes and Drums then perform, marching through the gatehouse of the castle and performing a traditional pipe band set. Then, the show's featured acts perform individually.

== Performers ==
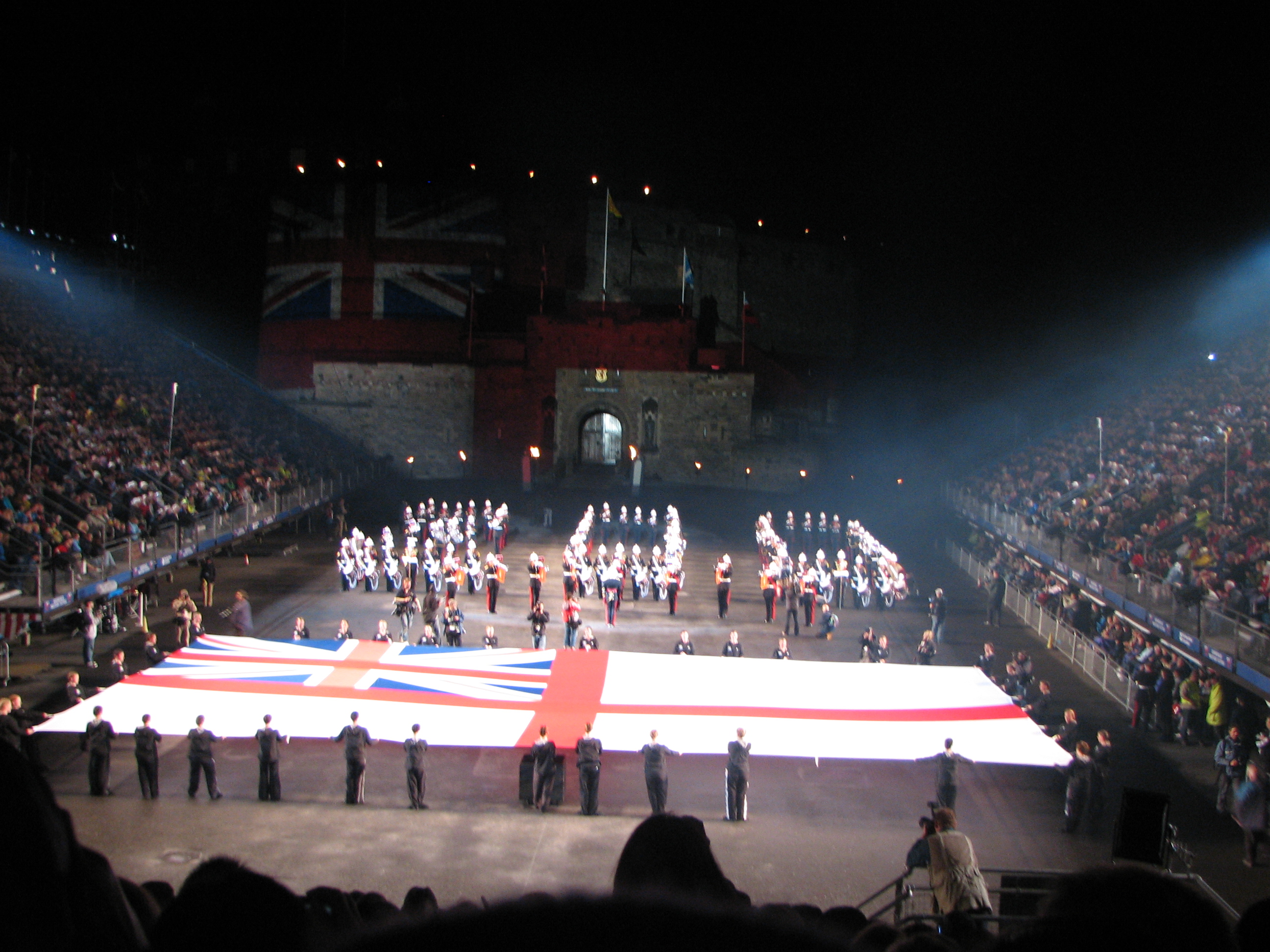
The 2005 Edinburgh Military Tattoo celebrated Trafalgar 200

Each service is usually represented by bands from the British Armed Forces, along with drill and display teams as well. On special occasions, the Tattoo will feature bands from more than one service at the same time. In both 2002 and 2012, bands from all three services were featured to mark Elizabeth II's Golden and Diamond Jubilees. In 2003, the music of Westlife was featured at the event.

From 1950 until 1994, the show mainly featured acts from military organizations. However, the show began to diversify and feature civilian acts beginning in 1995. While this was initially met with resistance from some fans, the inclusion of civilian acts has become more and more present in the show over time. One of the most popular acts featured at the Tattoo is the Top Secret Drum Corps from Basel, which has performed in the 2003, 2006, 2009, 2012, 2015, 2018, 2022, and 2025 Tattoos. By 2018 performers from 48 countries had appeared in the tattoo since its inception.

Since 2014, a house pipe band was introduced to allow individual pipers and drummers from not only Scotland but across many parts of the world to play in the Tattoo. Known as The Royal Edinburgh Military Tattoo Pipes and Drums, they join in with the massed pipes and drums each year and are the first pipe band with no military connections to play in the Tattoo.

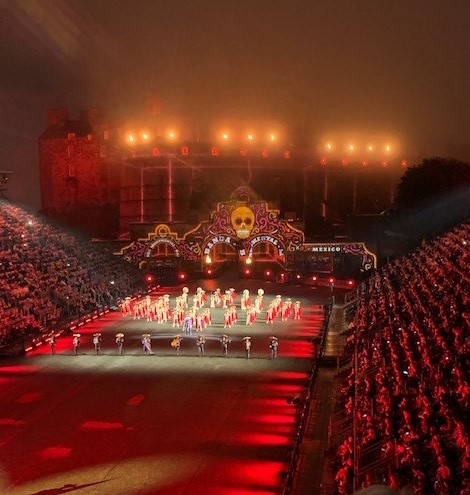
Banda Monumental de Mexico at Edinburgh Military Tattoo 2022

A stage band made up of volunteer musicians from around the world was assembled for the 2019 show. The 2022 performers included Banda Monumental de México, the United States Army Field Band in its debut Tattoo performance, the Highland Divas, the New Zealand Army Band and the United States Air Force Honor Guard Drill team. The 2025 Tattoo saw performers include the Band of the Polish Border Guard, the Top Secret Drum Corps from Switzerland, the United States Honour Guard Air Force Drill Team, the Ukraine Naval Forces Orchestra, and the United States Old Guard Fife and Drum Corps.

=== Guards of honour ===
The sentries that mount the Castle Drawbridge guard is typically provided by the resident infantry battalion of Redford Barracks. Several other units have also been invited to provide sentries for the Castle Drawbridge and/or form the guard of honour for the performance's finale. They include:

- 1998: 1st Battalion, The King's Own Scottish Borderers
- 1999: 1st Battalion, The Argyll and Sutherland Highlanders (Princess Louise's)
- 2000: 1st Battalion, The Argyll and Sutherland Highlanders (Princess Louise's)
- 2001: 1st Battalion, The Light Infantry
- 2002: 1st Battalion, The Highlanders (Seaforth, Gordons and Camerons)
- 2003: 1st Battalion, The Royal Scots (The Royal Regiment)
- 2004: The Royal Gibraltar Regiment
- 2005: Royal Naval Reserve
- 2006: The Argyll and Sutherland Highlanders, 5th Battalion The Royal Regiment of Scotland
- 2007: 40 Regiment, Royal Artillery
- 2008: Hans Majestet Kongens Garde
- 2009: The Highlanders, 4th Battalion The Royal Regiment of Scotland
- 2010: 3rd Battalion, The Rifles
- 2011: The Royal Highland Fusiliers, 2nd Battalion The Royal Regiment of Scotland
- 2012: The Black Watch, 3rd Battalion The Royal Regiment of Scotland
- 2013: The Black Watch, 3rd Battalion The Royal Regiment of Scotland
- 2014: Royal Navy
- 2015: Royal Scots Dragoon Guards (Carabiniers and Greys)
- 2016: 1st Battalion, Scots Guards
- 2017: Royal Navy / RAF Regiment
- 2018: RAF Regiment
- 2019: 7 Regiment, Royal Logistic Corps
- 2022: The Royal Regiment of Scotland / United States Air Force Honor Guard
- 2023: RAF Regiment / Hans Majestet Kongens Garde
- 2024: Royal Navy and Royal Marines.
- 2025: 1st Battalion, The Royal Yorkshire Regiment.

== Producers ==
Producers of the Edinburgh Tattoo have included:

- Lt Col George Malcolm of Poltalloch – Produced a pageant on the Castle Esplanade in 1947 entitled "The King's Men" and produced the first Edinburgh Tattoo in 1950.
- Captain Forbes Taylor – Produced the 1952 Tattoo. As a professional film director, Captain Forbes Taylor provided the experience upon which the format for subsequent Tattoos were set and included the first overseas performers.
- Brigadier Alistair MacLean of Pennycross – Director of the Tattoo from 1950-1953. Producer of the Tattoo from 1953 to 1959.
- Lt Col Duncan Carter-Campbell of Possil – Served with the Cameronians (Scottish Rifles). Producer of the Tattoo from 1960 to 1967.
- Brigadier Jack Sanderson – Former Scots Guards officer. Producer of the Tattoo from 1968 to 1975.
- Lt Col Leslie Dow – Served with the Cameronians (Scottish Rifles) and became producer in 1976–1991.
- Major Sir Michael Parker – Producer of the Royal Tournament (1974–1999), the Berlin Tattoo as well as the VE & VJ Day commemorations in 1995. Producer of the Tattoo from 1992 to 1994.
- Brigadier Sir Melville Jameson – Served with the Royal Scots Dragoon Guards and former commander of the Highland Brigade. Producer of the Tattoo from 1994 to 2006.
- Major-General Euan Loudon – Served with the Royal Highland Fusiliers and former GOC 2nd Division and Governor of Edinburgh Castle. Producer of the Tattoo from 2007 to 2010.
- Brigadier David Allfrey – Served with The Royal Scots Dragoon Guards. Producer of the Tattoo from 2011 to 2020.

Following the retirement of Brigadier David Allfrey in 2020, the role of Chief Executive and Producer was split into two positions. The leaders of the Tattoo were Major General Buster Howes CB OBE - Royal Marines officer and former Commandant General Royal Marines who joined the organisation as Chief Executive in June 2020 and Michael Braithwate, creative director who join in October 2020. In 2025, Alan Lane, an Army Reservist with 75 Engineer Regiment was appointed as creative director.

== See also ==
- Basel Tattoo
- Royal Nova Scotia International Tattoo
