= Berlin Military Tattoo =

Military band demonstration

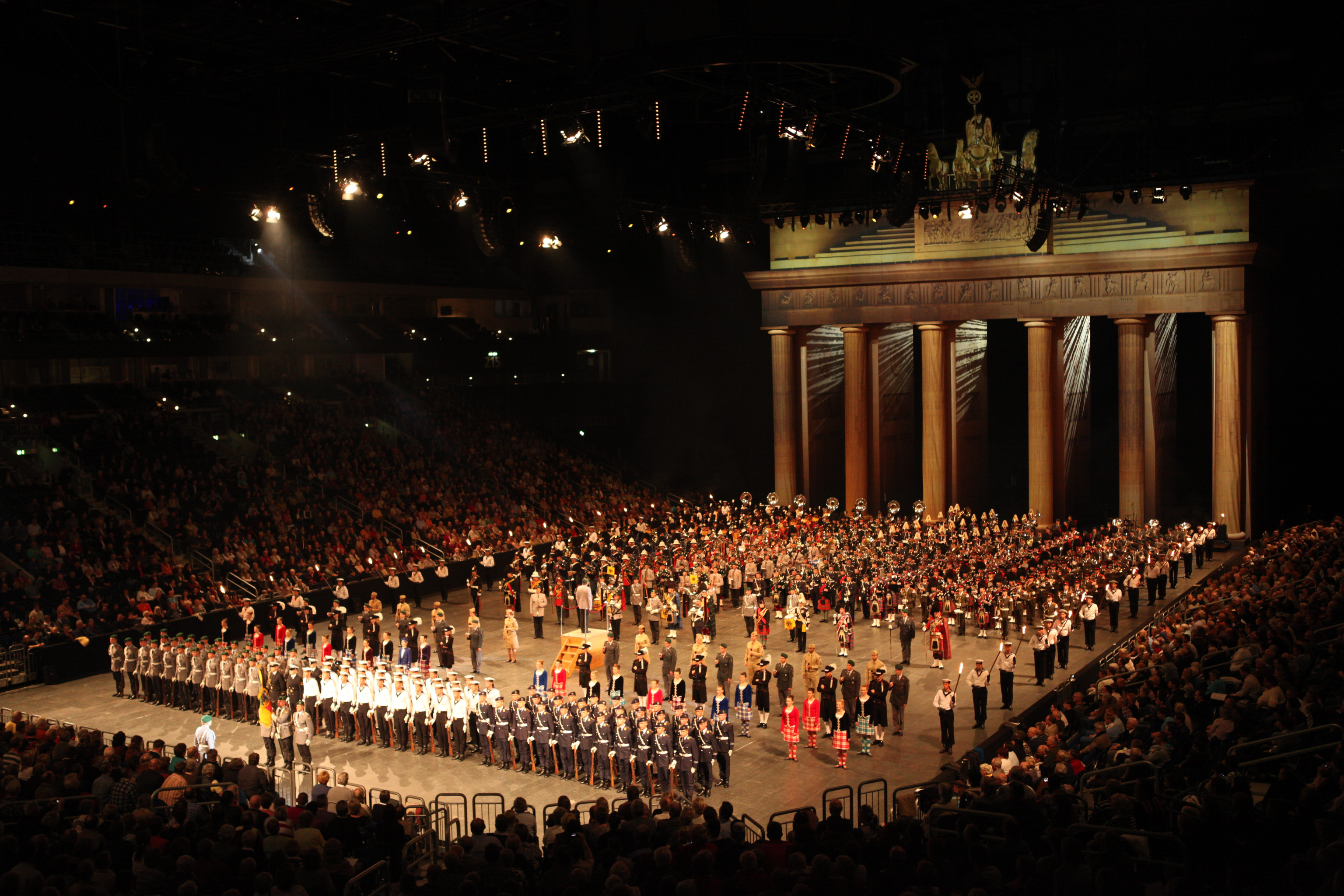
A massed group of military bands from several countries, at the 2011 Berlin Tattoo.

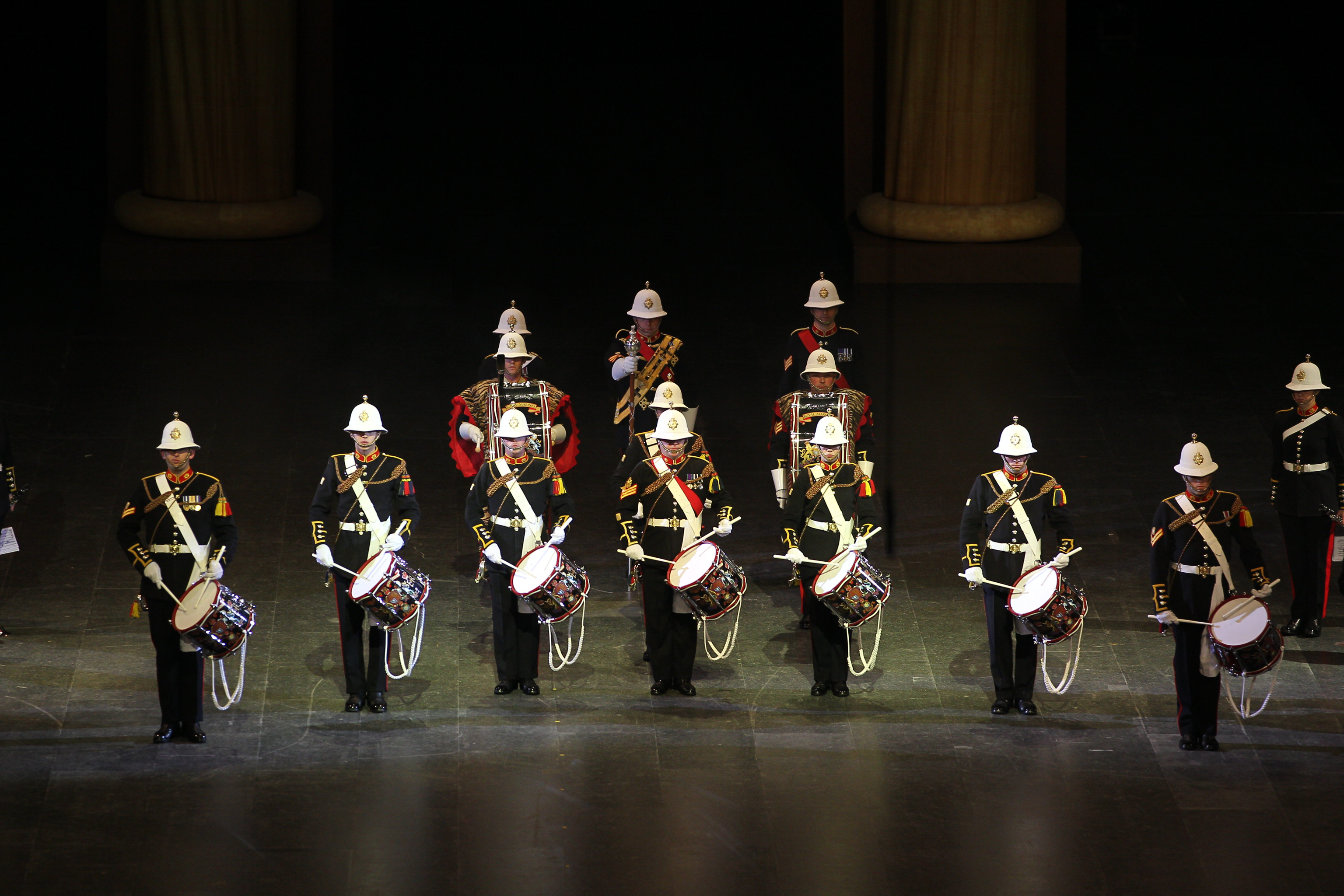
Drummers of the Royal Marines Band Service in the Berlin Tattoo.

The Berlin Military Tattoo (German: Berliner Militär Musikparade), or simply just the Berlin Tattoo is a German music show that features and showcases the Military bands of the Bundeswehr and foreign countries. The tattoo takes place on the first weekend of November in Berlin and is based on the concept of the Royal Edinburgh Military Tattoo. The event is currently the biggest tattoo in the Federal Republic of Germany. The tattoo is led by many producers, a notable one being Major Michael Parker of the British Army, who also was responsible for producing the Royal Tournament.

Until 2010, the tattoo was known as the Berlin Military Music Festival and took place in the Max-Schmeling-Halle. From 2011–2013, it took place in the O2 World Berlin (now the Mercedes-Benz Arena). In June 2014, the Berlin Tattoo was held in the Waldbühne.

== Sources and Links ==
- Official Website
- Der Königgrätzer Marsch - Berlin Tattoo
- The Tattoo in 2011
