= Band of the Coldstream Guards =

British military band

Coldstream Guards Band
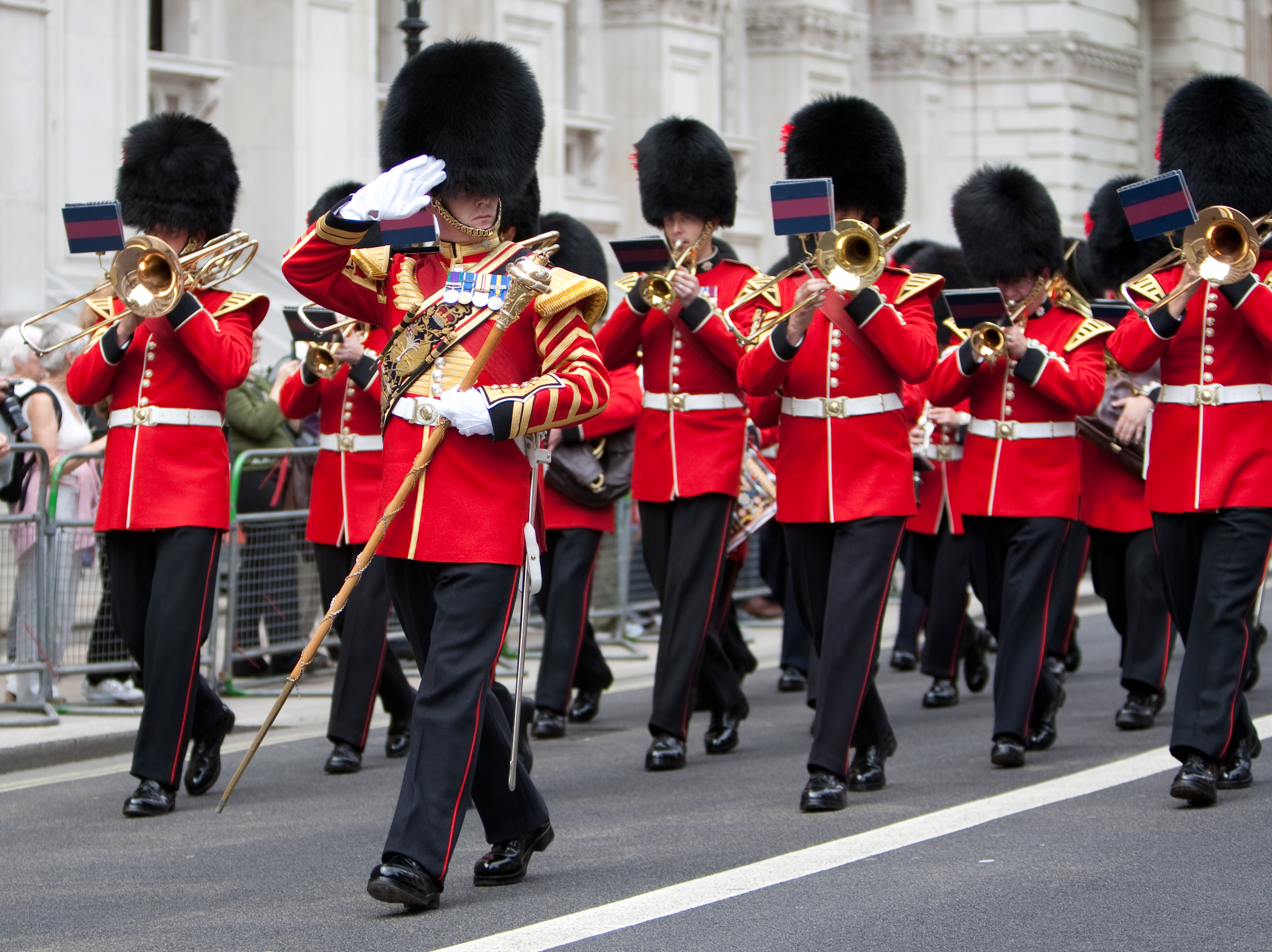

Background information
- Also known as: Band of the Coldstream Guards
- Origin: Sandhurst, United Kingdom
- Website: Home of the Coldstream Guards Band

The Band of the Coldstream Guards is one of the oldest and best known bands in the British Army, having been officially formed on 16 May 1785 under the command of Major C F Eley.

== History ==
The band of the Coldstream Guards was officially formed under the director of Music Major C.F. Eley on 16 May 1785.

The band received its first British bandmaster in 1835, Charles Godfrey.

On 18 June 1944 over one hundred twenty people were killed at Wellington Barracks when a German flying bomb hit the chapel. The director of the band was amongst the dead, prompting the appointment of Captain Douglas Alexander Pope.

In 1985, during the band's two hundredth anniversary year, the Coldstream Guards kicked off the Live Aid concert at Wembley Stadium, performing "a fanfare composed by the Director of Music Lt Col Richard Ridings".

Two especially unusual performances took place in the immediate aftermath of the September 11 attacks in the United States. On September 12, 2001, Queen Elizabeth II broke tradition and allowed the Coldstream Guards Band to perform The Star-Spangled Banner at Buckingham Palace, London, during the daily ceremonial Changing of the Guard. The following day at a St. Paul's Cathedral memorial service, the Queen herself joined in the singing of the American national anthem, an unprecedented occurrence. The Coldstream Guards played The Star-Spangled Banner again at Windsor Castle on the 20th anniversary of 9/11.

On 30 July 2025, the band performed Black Sabbath's "Paranoid" during the Changing of the Guard ceremony at Buckingham Palace in tribute to Black Sabbath's co-founding member and frontman Ozzy Osbourne on the day of his funeral cortège in Aston, Birmingham. Osbourne died eight days earlier at the age of 76.

== Ensembles ==
There are several ensembles within the Band of the Coldstream Guards:

- Concert Band

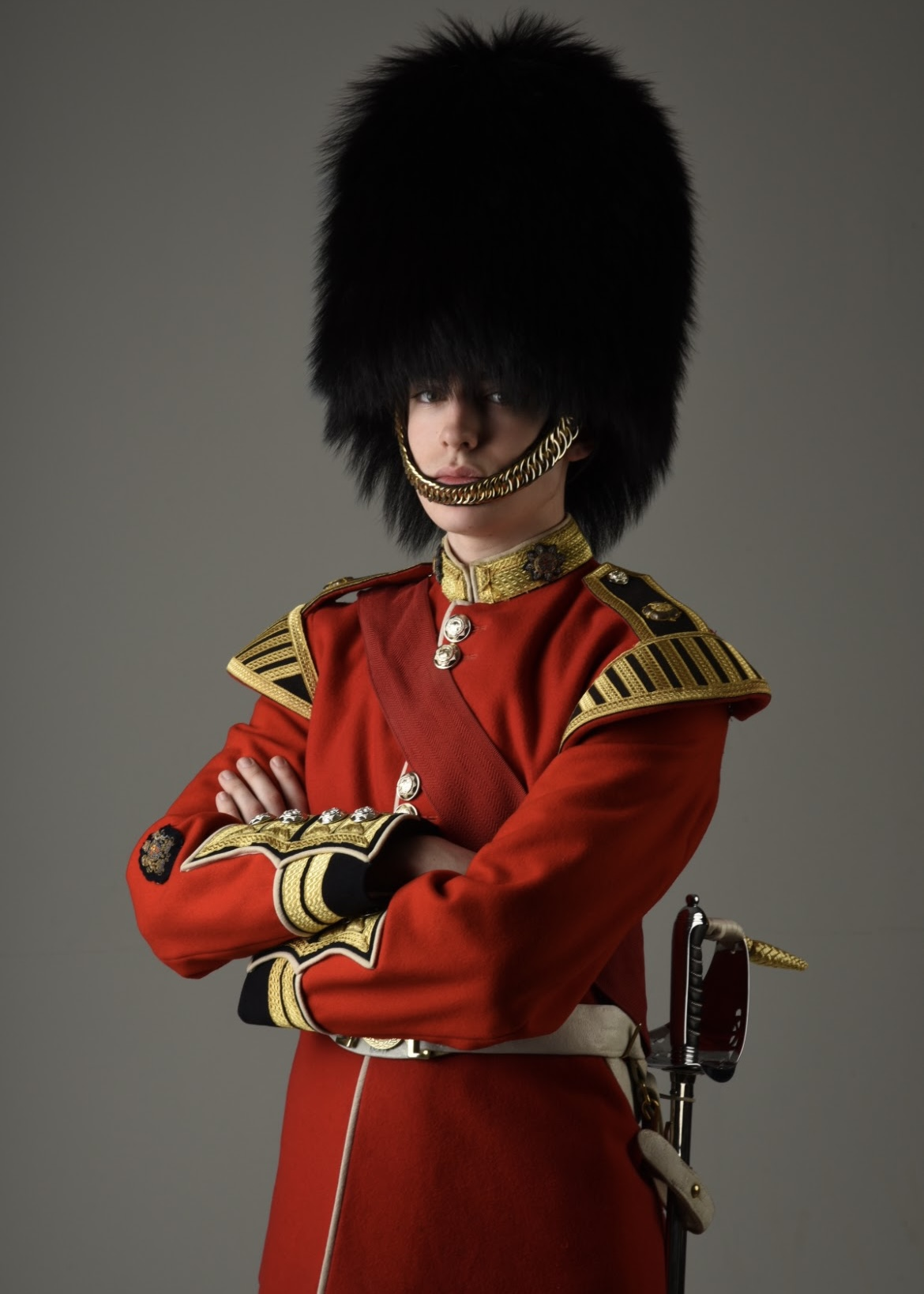
This is what a warrant officer in the Coldstream Guards Band would look like.

- Marching Band
- Brass Quintet
- Jazz Trio
- Fanfares

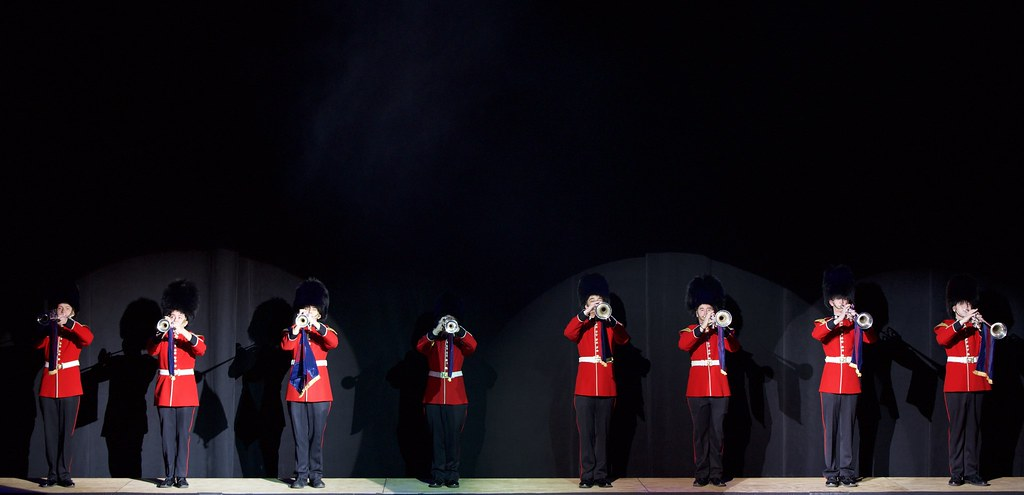
Coldstream Guards Fanfare Team 2018

- Woodwind Quintet
- 18th Century Band

== Functions ==
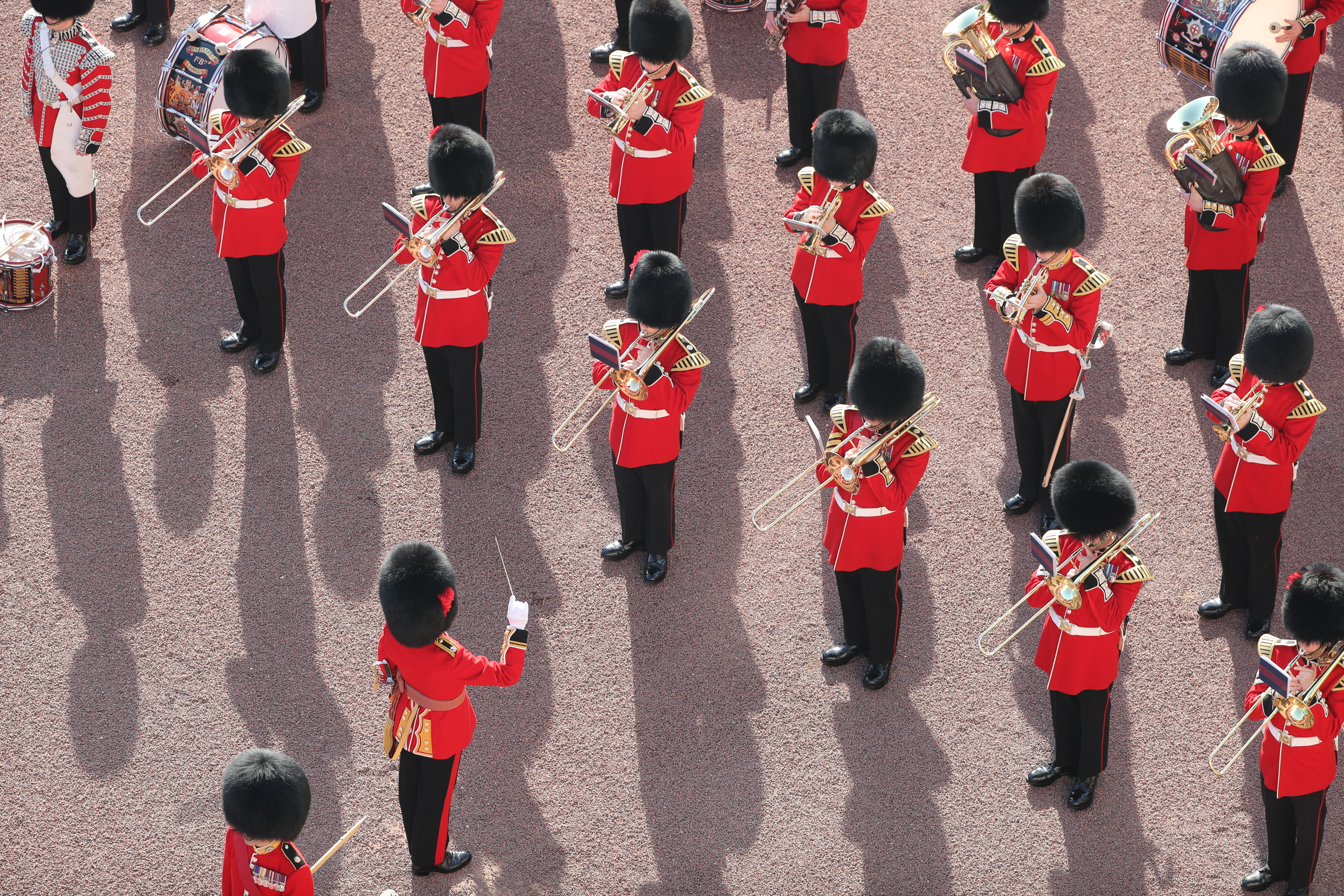
The band at the Commonwealth Heads of Government Meeting 2018.

The Coldstream Guards Band plays regularly for many events as part of the Massed Bands of the Household Division. Selected occasions that are most famous include:

- Beating Retreat
- Changing of the Guard
- The Festival of Remembrance
- Trooping the Colour
- Investitures
- State visits

== Album and Record Deal ==
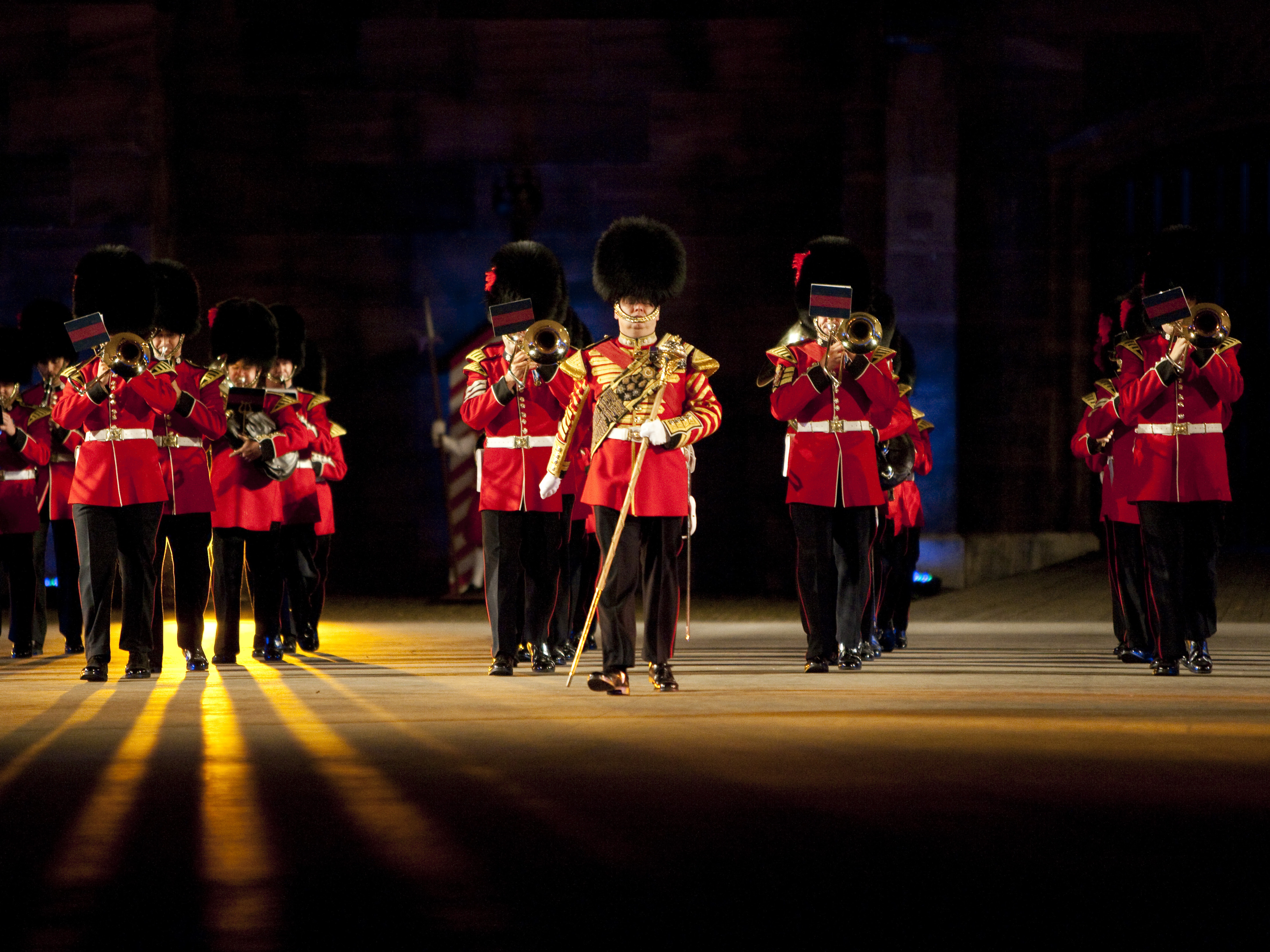
The Band of the Coldstream Guards, 2011 Berlin Tattoo.

In June 2009 the band signed a record deal with Universal Music imprint Decca, reportedly worth £1 million. Their debut album 'Heroes' was released on 30 November 2009 and was nominated for Best Album of the Year for Classical Brits. The Band of the Coldstream Guards performed at the Classical Brits Awards gala at the Royal Albert Hall.

== In media ==
In the closing credits of Dad's Army, the band played a instrumental march version of the theme tune, "Who Do You Think You Are Kidding, Mr Hitler?", conducted by Captain (later Lieutenant Colonel) Trevor L. Sharpe.

== See also ==
- Grenadier Guards Band
- Irish Guards Band
- Scots Guards Band
- Welsh Guards Band
- Household Division
