= Gun competition =

Gun competition could refer to:

- Gun shooting sports in general
- The field gun competition of the UK's Royal Navy
