= Field gun competition =

Team obstacle course competition in the British Royal Navy

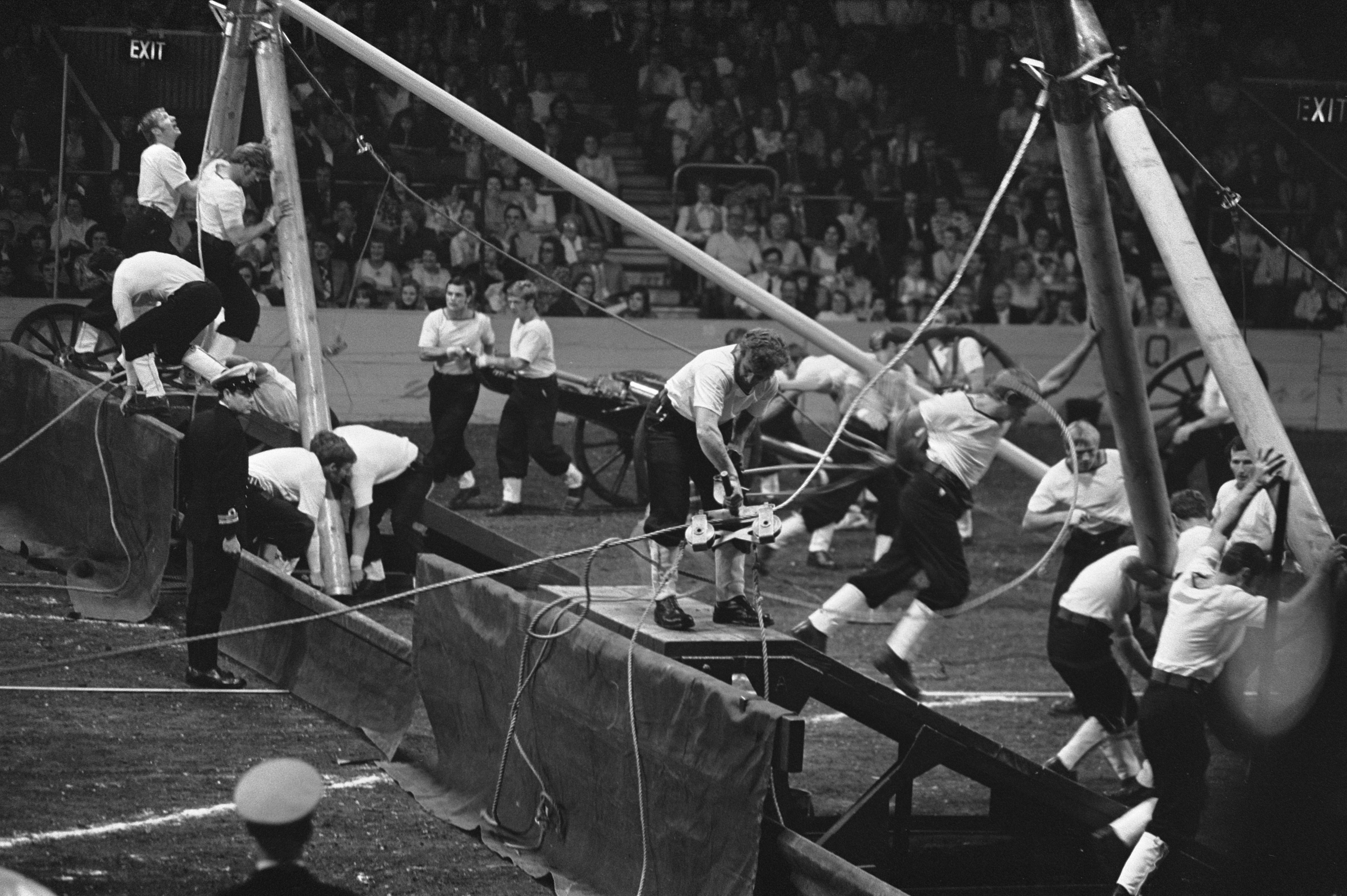
Field gun competition at Earl's Court in 1975

The Royal Navy's command field gun competition was a contest between teams from a number of Royal Navy commands, in which teams of sailors compete to transport a field gun and its equipment over and through a series of obstacles in the shortest time. The competition evolved during the early years of the 20th century. The "Command" format, negotiating walls and a chasm, was held annually at the Royal Tournament in London solely as a public display and as recruitment purposes from 1907 until 1999, apart from the periods during the World Wars. The "Inter-Port" or "Command" Competition was contested by teams from the Royal Navy annually, and was a popular item at the Royal Tournament until finishing in 1999.

A similar "Command" Field Gun, is still being run by civilians as Wellington College (cadet-size) and Portsmouth Action Field Gun (full-size). A second team, Eastbourne Youth Field Gun, established 2017 and also a cadet-size formation, is the newest field gun formation in the "Command" format.

The "Brickwoods" Field Gun competition also started in 1907 after the Brickwoods Brewery donated a magnificent Trophy to the Royal Navy. This competition involving no obstacles and run on a flat track continues to be competed for on an annual basis at HMS Collingwood as part of the HMS Collingwood Open day.

The Birmingham Tattoo, held yearly in the city of Birmingham, also hosts an inter-service field gun challenge as part of their programme. The format of the competition and drill, based on the Brickwoods competition, changes slightly due to the fact that the crews run on polished concrete surfaces. The track length is also fractionally shorter due to the size of the arena.

A spin-off, the Junior Leaders Field Gun Competition, using the Brickwoods format, was held for the 1st time in 2007 and is still held today.

== Origins ==
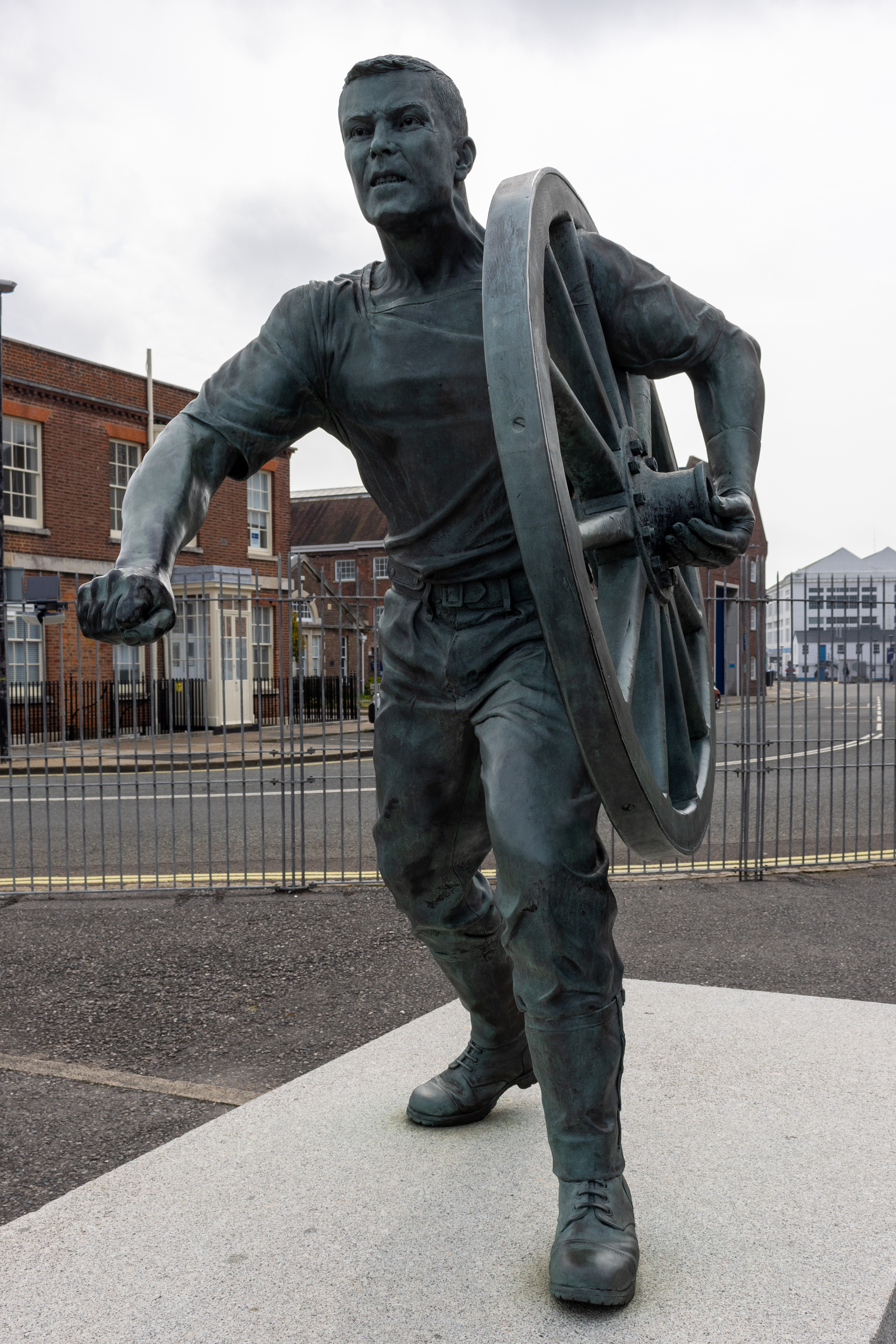
Statue at Portsmouth commemorating the field gun competition

The origins of the field gun competition lie in the Second Boer War in South Africa. The legendary story tells of the siege of the British garrison in Ladysmith in 1899. In support of the British Army, the Royal Navy landed guns from HMS Terrible and Powerful to help in the relief of the siege. The Naval Brigade transported guns over difficult terrain and brought them into action against the Boers.

The Royal Navy landed two 4.7-inch (120 mm) guns and four 12-pounder naval guns creating improvised field guns using makeshift gun carriages. The guns were transported inland by rail and then drawn on makeshift carriages by oxen. For the final part of the journey, sailors from the Naval Brigade manhandled the guns over very difficult terrain. One story tells of sailors carrying one of the 12-pounder guns for 2 miles (3.2 km) after one of the wheels collapsed.

The siege of Ladysmith lasted for 120 days until February 1900. On their return home, the sailors from the Naval Brigade paraded their guns through London and appeared at the Royal Naval and Military Tournament at the Agricultural Hall, Islington. Displays of field gun drill continued in subsequent years.

A precursor to the competition lay in the presentation of Field Gun 'Evolutions' including one performed by Miss Weston's Naval Boy's Brigade from Portsmouth at the Royal Albert Hall on 21 October 1905 as part of the Centenary Commemoration of the Battle of Trafalgar. A film clip of this evolution survives from the period which was filmed by Alfred J West for his popular 'Our Navy' film presentations in the early 1900s.

The Interport ("Command") Field Gun competition was established in 1907 and was a highlight of the Royal Tournament until the Last Run in 1999.

Information on the period 1908 to 1922 is scanty, but it seems that apart from the periods of war the Brickwood Trophy was competed for each year. There have been many changes to the competition. The 1907 challenge involved a team of 17 scaling a 5-foot-high (1.5 m) obstacle on a 75-yard-long (69 m) course and returning. In 1947 the course consisted of seven "very stiff obstacles" over a distance of 440 yards (400 m) each way. Today 18 strong teams compete over an 85-yard-long (78 m) flat track, a total run of 170 yards (160 m).

The "Brickwoods" trophy itself is a reproduction in silver of a 12-pounder field gun and a gun crew of seven sailors. The names of the winners of the trophy are engraved on small shields up to and including 1961 and plates for winners since 1962. Originally mounted on a black ebony stand, this was replaced in 1961 by the current polished wooden base. At this time the winners' shields transferred to the new mounting, although not in the same order as they had appeared on the previous stand.

The original stipulation by Brickwood that the trophy was only open to teams from within Portsmouth continued until 1975 when the competition was widened to include bases from around the country. The trophy left Portsmouth Command for the first time in 1978 as a result of HMS Fisgard's win. HMS Gannet's win in 1997 took the trophy to Scotland for the first time.

Before the First World War the competition was moved from the RN Barracks to Whale Island, where it continued until 1973; the following year it transferred to HMS Collingwood. HMS Collingwood itself has had a good record in the competition, having won the Brickwood Trophy 16 times between 1957 and 2006. Records for completing the course have continued to be broken. The Royal Marines set a new record in 1924 of 1 minute 24.40 seconds. This was exceeded in seven subsequent years and eventually in 1938 HMS Excellent achieved 1 minute 13.40 seconds.

After the war, with a different course and drill, Victoria Barracks achieved 1 minute 27.40 seconds in 1954. HMS Collingwood cut that to 1 minute 26.80 seconds in 1962. The record was lowered to 1 minute 19.40 seconds by HMS Daedalus in 1988. HMS Collingwood beat this by running a time of 1 minute 18.80 seconds in 2001. In 2011 HM Naval Base Portsmouth set a new record of 1 min 17.78 seconds.

Brickwood maintained a close interest in the competition over the years. In 1969 Sir Rupert Brickwood Bart presented the trophy and tankards and a firkin of Brickwood's beer to the winning team. In 1971 Brickwood's business was acquired by London-based brewers Whitbread & Co Ltd. The Royal Navy Royal Marines Charity (RNRMC) have taken over as the main event sponsor but the Brickwood's trophy remains.

== Competitions ==
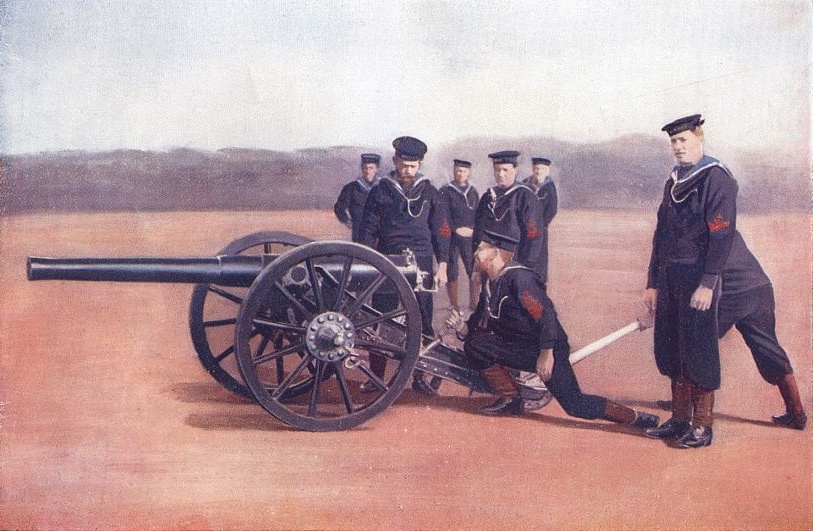
Naval crew with the 12-pounder 8 cwt, the type used in the competition, in the 1890s

=== Command Field Gun ===
The Royal Navy Field Gun competition was contested by teams from the Royal Naval commands of Portsmouth, Devonport and the Fleet Air Arm (although teams from Chatham and the Royal Marines have also competed). At each performance of the Royal Tournament, two crews competed to transport a 12 pounder field gun and limber over a series of obstacles.

From the start line in front of the Royal Box, the crews pulled the guns and limbers to the end of the arena where they turned and carried themselves and the equipment over a 5-foot (1.5 m) wall. The guns and limbers were then dismantled and carried to the top of a ramp on the "home side" of a 28-foot (8.5 m) "chasm". The crew set up a wire and traveller so all 18 members of the crew and their equipment could cross the chasm. The team and equipment then passed through a hole in the "enemy wall" at the end of the arena. Each crew then fired three rounds to end the "Run Out". The average time for the "Run Out" was 85 seconds.

The second part of the competition (the "Run Back") involved the crews taking all their equipment back over the 5-foot (1.5 m) enemy wall and then back across the chasm. Once all the crew and equipment were back on the home side of the chasm, the wire and traveller were dismantled and three more rounds were fired in a rear guard action. The average time for the "Run Back" was 60 seconds.

In the final stage, the "Run Home", men, guns and limbers passed back through the hole in the home wall and then the teams "hook up and pull for home". The clock was stopped as the teams crossed back over the start line. The average time for the "Run Home" was 21 seconds.

The record for the fastest run at the Royal Tournament was set by Devonport in 1999, the competition's final year, with 80.86 seconds for the "Run Out", 58.65 seconds for the "Run Back" and 20.92 seconds for the "Run Home", an aggregate of 2 minutes, 40.43 seconds.

Three Commands, Devonport, Fleet Air Arm and Portsmouth currently have associations made up of past members of their Command Field Gun Crews, since its demise in 1999 and a heritage centre and museum at Crownhill Fort, Plymouth is maintained and run by Devonport Field Gun Association.

=== Brickwood's Field Gun ===
The competition simulates the drill which would have been undertaken to bring a naval field gun into action during the march to Ladysmith.

1st Advance, 1st Wheel Change
The limber is lifted, its wheels and drag ropes are shipped and it is run forward. The gun wheels are exchanged with the limber wheels. The gun is brought to the back of the limber and connected, then both are run forward.

2nd Advance, 1st Action
The gun is unhooked and the limber is run to the 70-yard line, where it is turned or spun to face the start; its wheels are removed, and it is dropped to the ground. The gun is run to the end of the track, turned and stopped. The gun is fired three times, each shell being run to the gun from the limber by the fastest man in the crew.

1st Retire, 2nd Wheel Change
The limber wheels are shipped, and it is run back and hooked to the gun. Both are then run towards the start, stopped and lifted together to exchange wheels. This is the heaviest lift of all, and life gets very difficult if the gear is dropped.

2nd Retire, 2nd Action
Gun and limber are run towards the start line, separated and stopped. The gun is fired three times as quickly as possible.

3rd Retire and Finish
The limber is run back and hooked to the gun, then every member of the crew strains to accelerate the gear over the finish line. This is not the best time to fall in front of the gear, because it is very heavy and cannot be stopped.

Result

Time penalties are added to the running time for each contravention of the rules, which are published each year under the title "Royal Navy Field Gun Instructions (RNFGI)". There are 38 possible contraventions defined that carry a time penalty ranging from 1 to 6 seconds. These are applied as appropriate to each team upon completion of the drill by the event's Chief Judge.

The track is 85 yards (78 m) long, which means a total run of 170 yards (160 m).

== Previous winners of the Brickwood Trophy ==
- 1985 HMS Osprey
- 1986 HMS Daedalus
- 1987 HMS Defiance
- 1988 HMS Daedalus
- 1989 HMS Daedalus
- 1990 HMS Nelson
- 1991 HMS Sultan
- 1992 HMS Dolphin
- 1993 HMS Seahawk
- 1994 HMS Thunderer
- 1995 HMS Sultan
- 1996 HMS Collingwood
- 1997 HMS Gannet
- 1998 HMS Collingwood
- 1999 HMS Neptune
- 2000 HMS Heron
- 2001 HMS Collingwood
- 2002 HMS Heron
- 2003 HMS Collingwood
- 2004 HM Naval Base Portsmouth
- 2005 7 Air Assault Battalion REME
- 2006 HMS Collingwood
- 2007 HM Naval Base Portsmouth (100th Anniversary)
- 2008 HMS Sultan
- 2009 HM Naval Base Portsmouth
- 2010 HM Naval Base Portsmouth
- 2011 HMS Heron (HM Naval Base Portsmouth set a new record of 1 min 17.78 secs)
- 2012 HM Naval Base Portsmouth (1.19.88)
- 2013 HMS Heron
- 2014 7 Air Assault Battalion REME (1.20.03)
- 2015 HMS Heron (With a new record of 1 min 17.69)
- 2016 7th Air Assault Battalion REME
- 2017 7th Air Assault Battalion REME (New record set of 1.16.19)
- 2018 RNAS Yeovilton (HMS Heron)(1.19.74)
- 2022 RNAS Culdrose (HMS Seahawk)(1.18.81)
- 2023 RNAS Culdrose (HMS Seahawk)
- 2025 REME
- 2026 REME

Plate 1 Winners:

- 2012 REME (1.22.90)
- 2014 RAF Cosford (1.23.16)
- 2015 HMS Raleigh
- 2016 HMS Queen Elizabeth
- 2017 MOD Corsham (1.24.00)
- 2018 Royal Engineers (1.24.31)
- 2022 RAF Cosford
- 2023 British Forces Cyprus (1.26.70)
- 2025 42 Commando Royal Marines
- 2026 Royal Marines

Plate 2 Winners

- 2001 HMS Nelson
- 2012 Collingwood B (1.32.59)
- 2013 MOD Abbey Wood
- 2014 Naples (1.30.22)
- 2016 MOD Corsham
- 2017 HMS Collingwood B (1.27.12)
- 2018 British Forces Cyprus (1.29.30)
- 2022 British Forces Cyprus
- 2023 NATO JWC

Plate 3 Winners:

- 2012 DMSTG (1.28.53)
- 2014 HMS Heron B (1.27.88)
- 2016 JFC Naples (1.32.47)
- 2017 HMS Ocean (1.34.75)
- 2018 Maritime Reserves (1.31.28)

Least Penalty Points Trophy:

- 2000 JSU Gibraltar
- 2002 HMS Sultan B Crew (0 Penalties Points)
- 2007 HMS Portsmouth
- 2008 HMS Nelson
- 2014 MOD Abbey Wood (0 penalties)
- 2016 HMS Seahawk & HMS Queen Elizabeth
- 2017 7th Air Assault Battalion REME
- 2023 NATO JWC (0 Penalties)

Fastest Run

- 2017 7th Air Assault Battalion REME (1.16.19)

== Notes & References ==
- Field Gun - A Century of History
- Online Information Bank (National Museum of the Royal Navy, Information Sheet No. 28)
- www.royaltournament.org
- The Birmingham Military Tattoo
- (BFI Curated film of early Field Gun Evolution at Whale Island filmed by Alfred J West)
