= Trevor L. Sharpe =

British composer (1921–2010)

Trevor L. Sharpe LVO OBE LRAM ARCM
- Born: 1921; Canterbury, Kent, England
- Died: 22 May 2010 (aged 88–89); Bridstow, Herefordshire, England
- Military career
- Branch: British Army
- Rank: Lieutenant Colonel
- Unit: Coldstream Guards

Lieutenant colonel Trevor le Mare Sharpe LVO OBE LRAM ARCM (1921 – 22 May 2010) was a British army officer, composer, music educator and conductor.

Sharpe was appointed the Director of Music of the Coldstream Guards in 1963; he was credited at the end of each episode of Dad's Army, as the regimental band performed the closing theme tune.

== Discography ==
=== Ceremonial Occasion ===
Sharpe released Ceremonial Occasion with the Band of the Royal Military School of Music (Kneller Hall), and the Fanfare Trumpeters of the Royal Military School of Music; it was produced by Treasure Island Music.

No.	Title	Length
1.	"Royal jubilee (Fanfare)"	1:11
2.	"Music for an investiture"	6:19
3.	"The music makers"	3:51
4.	"Ceremonial occasion"	6:48
5.	"Vivat regina (Suite)"	5:51
6.	"Nulli secundus (Fanfare)"	1:02
7.	"A history of the march including Trumpet voluntary/With sword and lance/Stars and stripes for ever"	18:12
8.	"Soldiers (Fantasia)"	9:31
Total length:		52:43
