= Ian Fraser (Canadian Army officer) =

Canadian producer of military tattoos (1932–2026)

Colonel Ian Simon Fraser ONS (23 September 1932 – 8 January 2026) was a Canadian army colonel who was a leading producer of large-scale military tattoos and events in Canada and overseas.

== Life and career ==
Ian Fraser was born on 23 September 1932 in Nova Scotia, Canada. He served in the Canadian Army and Canadian Forces from 1952 to 1983, retiring with the rank of colonel, having had regimental service with The Black Watch (Royal Highland Regiment) of Canada, The Royal Canadian Regiment (RCR) and the Canadian Airborne Regiment. Fraser was commanding officer of 2RCR, the Canadian School of Infantry and the Canadian Airborne Regiment, and during his military career served in Canada, Germany, India and Cyprus. Fraser was also a graduate of the Indian Defence Services Staff College and the Canadian National Defence College.

After producing a small scale Tattoo in the late 1950s, in 1962 Fraser was recruited as the Producer/Director of the Canadian Tattoo for the Seattle World's Fair. In 1967 he was then chosen to write, produce and direct the Canadian Armed Forces Centennial Tattoo 1967. The Centennial Tattoo remains the world's largest ever touring production, touring across Canada from April to November 1967, and presented in 44 locations covering every Canadian province.

In 1979, Fraser produced and directed the first Nova Scotia Tattoo, to mark the first International Gathering of the Clans outside Scotland. The event was attended and opened by Queen Elizabeth the Queen Mother. The Nova Scotia Tattoo has since been held annually, becoming known as the Royal Nova Scotia International Tattoo, following the royal designation bestowed upon the event in 2006 by Queen Elizabeth II on the occasion of the 80th birthday.

Fraser remained producer/director until 2007, when he passed the role of producer on to CEO Ann Montague. Fraser remained artistic director of the show, until taking a consulting role then retiring from the production in 2016.

In addition to his work in Nova Scotia, Fraser acted as a consultant for a variety of additional productions in Canada, Australia, South Africa, the United States and Europe, producing and directing 100s of shows throughout his career. Fraser has also written plays for the Canadian Broadcasting Corporation (CBC), authored numerous published books, short stories and articles (under pseudonyms), and was the recipient of numerous awards including the Order of Military Merit, the Canadian Forces' Decoration, the Order of Nova Scotia and the Order of Merit of the Federal Republic of Germany. In 2001 Fraser was granted a Doctor of Civil Laws, Honoris Causa, from Acadia University.

== Personal life ==
Fraser and his wife (m. 1957) had two daughters and four grandchildren. He died on 8 January 2026, at the age of 93.

== See also ==
- Military Tattoo
