= Military tattoo =

Musical display of armed forces

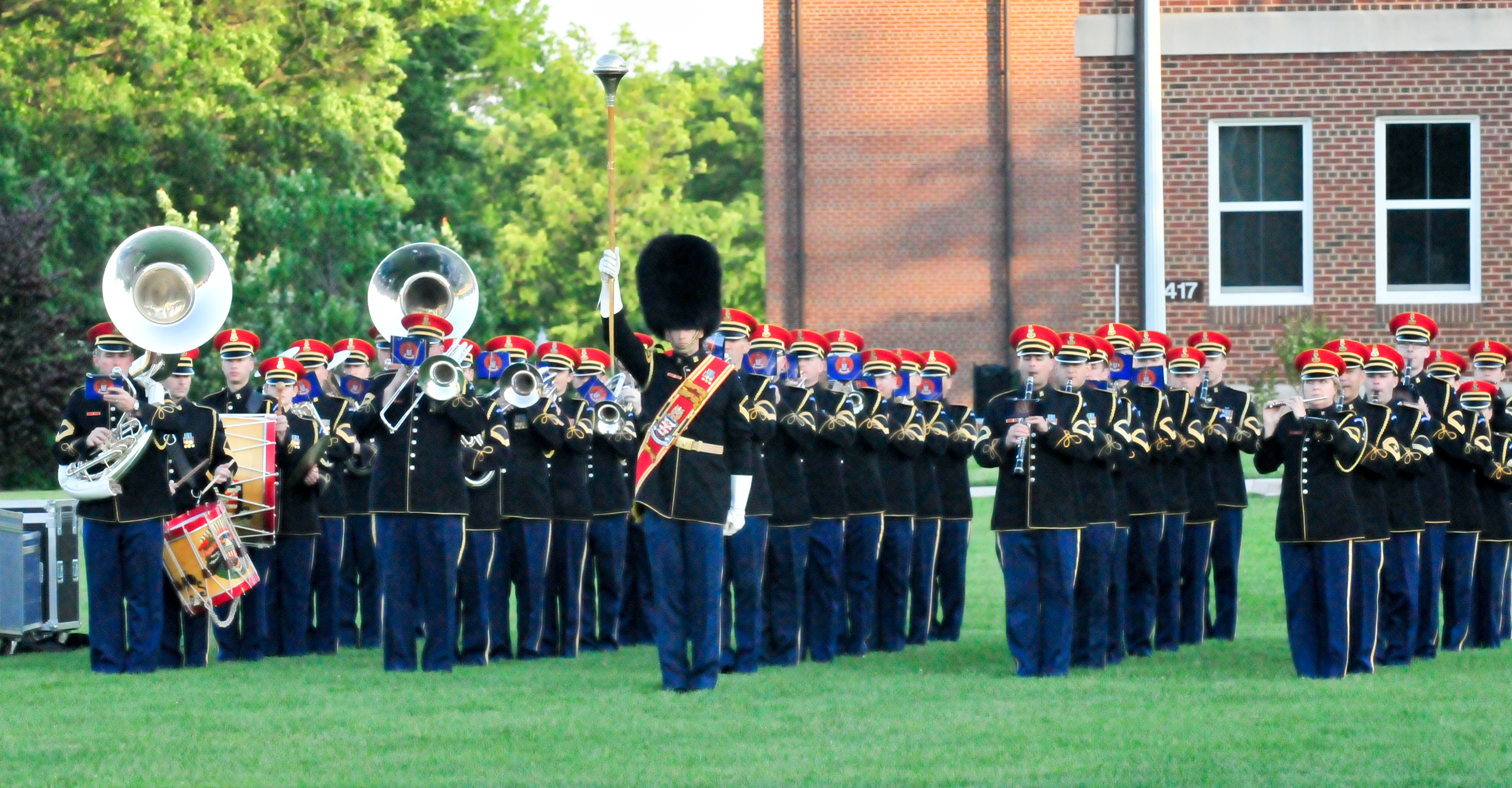
The United States Army Band during the 2018 Twilight Tattoo

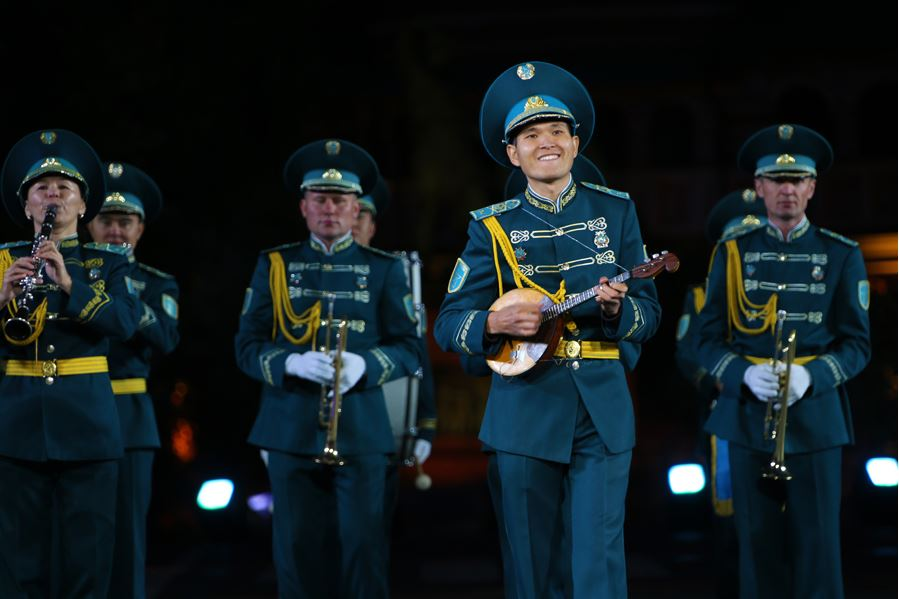
The Band of the Kazakh Republican Guard at the Spasskaya Tower Military Music Festival and Tattoo in 2014

A military tattoo is a performance of music or display of armed forces in general. The term comes from the early 17th-century Dutch phrase doe den tap toe ('turn off the tap'), a signal sounded by drummers or trumpeters to instruct innkeepers near military garrisons to stop serving beer and for soldiers to return to their barracks. The term is not related to the word "tattoo" that denotes the body markings, a term borrowed from the Tahitian language.

A tattoo was originally a form of military music but it has evolved into more elaborate shows involving theatrics and musical performances. The term is also used to designate military exhibitions, such as the Royal International Air Tattoo.

== Etymology ==
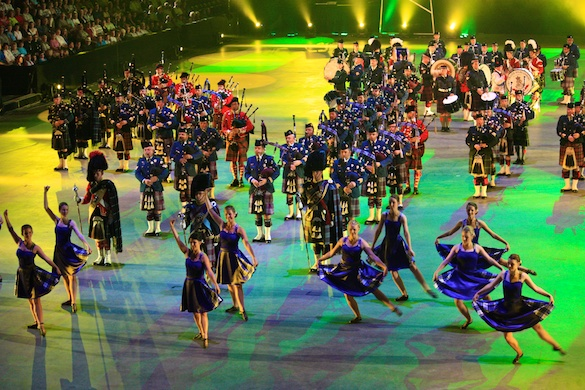
Quebec City Military tattoo, Quebec, Canada

The term dates from around 1600 during the Thirty Years' War in the Low Countries (Belgium and the Netherlands). The Dutch fortresses were garrisoned with mercenary troops who had been under federal command since 1594. The Dutch States Army had become a federal army, consisting mostly of Protestant German, Scottish, English and Swiss mercenaries, but commanded by a Dutch officer corps. Drummers from the garrison were sent out into the towns at 21:30 hrs (9:30 pm) each evening to inform the soldiers that it was time to return to barracks and the innkeepers that no more beer was to be served, that the taps were to be closed. The drummers continued to play until the curfew at 22:00 hrs (10:00 pm). Tattoo, earlier spelled tap-too then taptoo, are alterations of the Dutch words tap toe, which have the same meaning. Taptoo was the earlier alteration of the phrase and was used in George Washington's papers in which he said: "In future the Reveille will beat at day-break; the troop at 8 in the morning; the retreat at sunset and taptoo at nine o'clock in the evening."

Over the years the process became more of a show and often included the playing of the first post at 21:30 hrs and the last post at 22:00. Bands and displays were included and shows were often conducted by floodlight or searchlight. Tattoos were commonplace in the late 19th century, with most military and garrison towns putting on some kind of show or entertainment during the summer months. Between the First World War and the Second World War elaborate military tattoos were held in many towns and cities, with the largest held in Aldershot in the United Kingdom.

== Notable examples ==
=== Europe ===
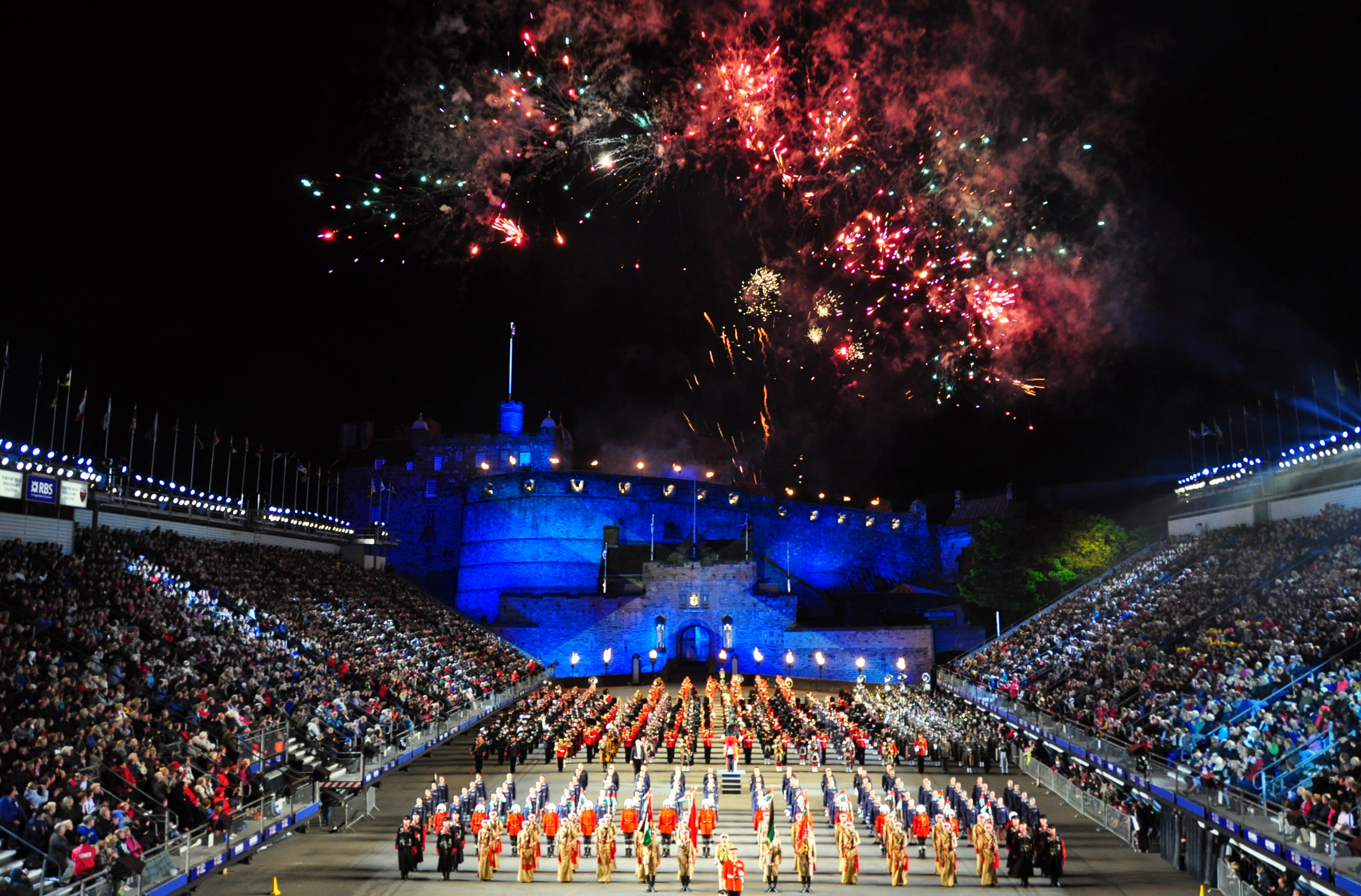
Royal Edinburgh Military Tattoo, 2010

- One of the best-known tattoos is held on the Esplanade in front of Edinburgh Castle each August as part of the annual Edinburgh Festival. The Royal Edinburgh Military Tattoo was first staged in 1950; it combines the traditional sounds of the bagpipes and drums with the modern aspects of the armed forces. In 2008, the Windsor Castle Royal Tattoo was launched and held in the private grounds of Windsor Castle by permission of HM The Queen. The event's proceeds went to the Royal British Legion to help support recently returned troops from battle.
- Another well-known tattoo was the Royal Tournament which was held annually in London from 1880 to 1999. The last producer of the Royal Tournament was Major Sir Michael Parker. The British Military Tournament, its successor, was established in 2010 at the former venue of the Royal Tournament, Earl's Court, lasting until 2013. Another UK tattoo is the Birmingham Tattoo held annually at the National Indoor Arena in November, which has been attracting audiences to Birmingham since 1989.
- The Royal International Air Tattoo is the world's largest military airshow, held annually at RAF Fairford in Gloucestershire in aid of the RAF Charitable Trust.
- The Basel Tattoo (Switzerland) was started in 2006 by the local Top Secret Drum Corps. It has grown to be the world's second-largest military tattoo in terms of performers and budget after the Edinburgh Military Tattoo.
- The Norwegian Military Tattoo is internationally famous for its quality and streamlined production. It has been held every two years since 1994 in the capital of Norway, Oslo. Since 1996 the shows have been presented indoors - in the Oslo Spektrum which is "tailor-made" for this kind of event.
- Russia started the annual "Spasskaya Bashnya" (Russian for Spasskaya Tower) international military tattoo in Moscow in 2010 (with Valery Khalilov as its founding executive producer until 2016). Its Russian name came from the name of the location where it is performed (at the Red Square's "Saviour Tower"). Although it is commonly referred to as "Spasskaya Bashnya Military Tattoo", its actual English name is "International Military Music Festival", and has been held since 2006. Its latest edition will be held in late August 2022, and the tattoo forms part of Moscow's city birthday celebrations.
- Großer Zapfenstreich is an occasional military ceremony and tattoo that is currently or formerly conducted by the militaries of Germany, Austria, East Germany and Prussia. This traditional event is only done by military bands of the Bundeswehr and the Austrian Armed Forces and reflects the origins of the tattoo as an evening ceremony, and is done on special occasions.
- The biannual Hamina Tattoo in Finland is the official military tattoo event of the Finnish Defence Forces.
- The National Military Tattoo in the Rotterdam Ahoy indoor stadium, held since 1948, is the official military tattoo of the Netherlands Armed Forces. It was formerly held in Delft and Breda before moving to Rotterdam in 2006.
- The Taptoe Brussels, originating in 2001, was initiated by the Koninklijke Muziekfederatie van het Brussels Hoofdstedelijk Gewest, with the aim of orchestrating an "international tattoo" event at the Grand Place in Brussels.

=== North America ===
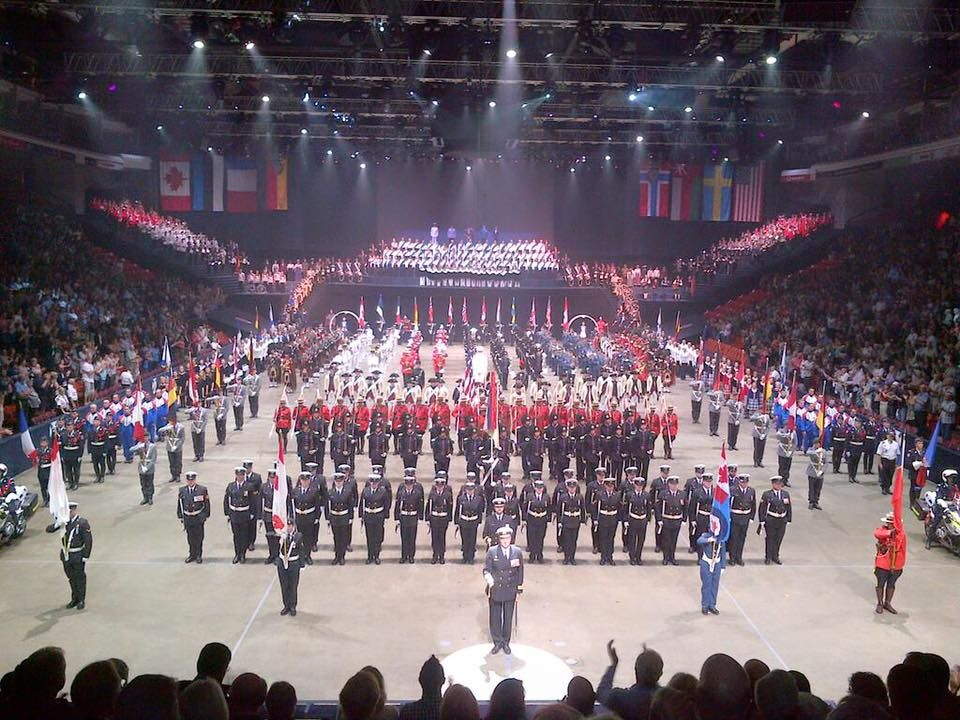
Finale scene from the 2015 Royal Nova Scotia International Tattoo

- Canada's Royal Nova Scotia International Tattoo is the largest annual indoor tattoo in the world today, each year featuring over 2000 performers from around the world. The tattoo has been produced since 1979 by Colonel Ian Fraser, who also produced the Canadian Armed Forces Tattoo 1967, the world's largest travelling show. Through the course of his career Fraser has produced and directed more than 1000 international tattoo productions across the globe. This tattoo is unique in that it is a full theatrical production, comprising costume designers, props designers, full wardrobe staff, and is presented as 'theatre in the round'. The show is intensely rehearsed over a two-week period and is a wholly combined military and civilian production. The Nova Scotia Tattoo was the first tattoo to receive a royal designation on the occasion of Her Majesty Queen Elizabeth II's 80th Birthday in 2006.

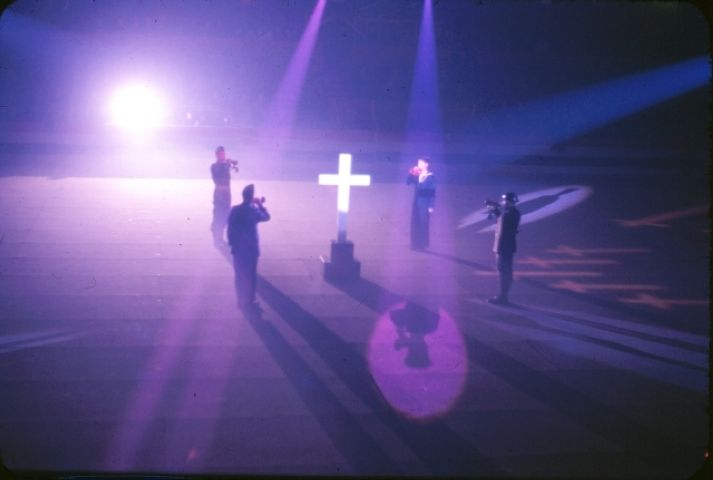
Buglers playing the Last Post during scene 8 of Tattoo 1967

- The Canadian Armed Forces Tattoo 1967 was the largest mobile tattoo in history performing 155 performances in 47 cities from coast to coast from the end of March to the middle of October 1967. Tattoo 1967 was a completely military production involving over 1700 personnel from the Canadian Army, Navy and Air Force. The first leg of the tour involved transporting two shows across Canada by rail. The second phase saw "the show" performed in stadiums in major cities including a week-long run in Montreal, Quebec during EXPO 67. The third phase was a tour of East Coast cities and Quebec performing in arenas. The show received rave reviews and standing ovations and was called upon by the press to become an annual event and to have it tour not only throughout the United States but Europe as well but with the last performance on October 11, 1967, at Shawinigan, Quebec, the Tattoo was mothballed. Eventually, all the costumes and uniforms were sold off to museums or private collectors and the show that was hailed as "the greatest single presentation during Centennial year" has never been produced since. The producer of Tattoo 1967, Colonel Ian Fraser also produced the Royal Nova Scotia International Tattoo.
- The annual Fort Henry Tattoo is held each July at Fort Henry in Kingston, Ontario. The event combines military drill, with an assortment of musical acts from across Canada, and is capped off with a fireworks display at the end of the evening. It is one of the largest annual events held at the National Historic Site.
- The now-defunct Quebec City International Festival of Military Bands, and its Quebec City Military Tattoo, took place in August between 1998 and 2013.
- The Ceremonial Guard conducts many different military tattoos in the Ottawa–Gatineau Region, including the Fortissimo Sunset Ceremony on Parliament Hill in July and the Governor General and Commander-in-Chief's Military Tattoo at Rideau Hall. The latter event honours the King of Canada in his position as Commander-in-Chief of the Canadian Armed Forces. The former emulates the British Beating Retreat while including the practice of lowering of the Canadian flag. Aside from the Band of the Ceremonial Guard, participating units in both events included the Central Band of the Canadian Armed Forces, the Canadian National Drill Team, and the Royal Military College of Canada Band.
- The different services of the Canadian Forces have held local tattoos in their areas of operations. In September 2010, the Royal Canadian Navy sponsored the Canadian Naval Centennial Tattoo in Pacific Coliseum in Vancouver celebrating the 100th anniversary of the RCN. Among the bands that performed were the Band of the Royal Marines, the Vancouver Police Pipe Band, the Pipe Band of The Seaforth Highlanders of Canada and the Naden Band of Maritime Forces Pacific. In August 2013, a Sunset Ceremony was held at CFB Greenwood, featuring the 14 Wing Band and Pipes and Drums as well as the Stadacona Band of Maritime Forces Atlantic, the Bridgewater Fire Department Band, the RCMP Pipes and Drums, and the drill team of the 78th (Highlanders) Regiment of Foot. The Black Watch Military Tattoo is an event sponsored by The Black Watch (Royal Highland Regiment) of Canada.
- The largest tattoo in the United States, is the Virginia International Tattoo, held every year in Norfolk, Virginia. Over 850 performers play traditional music and many international acts join every branch of the United States Armed Forces.
- The United States Air Force holds tattoos for many different events and celebrations, like base openings and closures, and special events like the 21st Annual Langley Tattoo. The Air Force's largest tattoo is held the last Friday of June each year at Wright-Patterson AFB, Ohio. The 2010 tattoo there drew an estimated 75,000 people and featured the rock group 38 Special. The 2011 event featured aircraft flyovers and music by country group Lonestar.
- Twilight Tattoo is an hour-long United States Army military tattoo held by Military District of Washington (MDW). Recurring units who participate in the tattoo include the 3rd U.S. Infantry Regiment (The Old Guard) and the Old Guard Fife and Drum Corps. The ceremony, which is held weekly during the summer, is held on the grounds of Joint Base Myer–Henderson Hall. The MDW revived the event in 1961 after it was discontinued before the Second World War.
- The Cleveland International Tattoo (CIT) in Cleveland, Ohio, is traditionally held annually on the third weekend in May. Started in 1985, the CIT has performed at Masonic Hall, Jacobs Pavilion at Nautica, Playhouse Square, and presently at Cleveland Public Auditorium.
- The West Point Military Tattoo is held annually at the United States Military Academy, West Point, New York. It is traditionally held on the 4th Sunday in April at the outdoor amphitheater on Trophy Point overlooking the Hudson River. The Tattoo is hosted by the Pipes and Drums of the US Corps of Cadets.

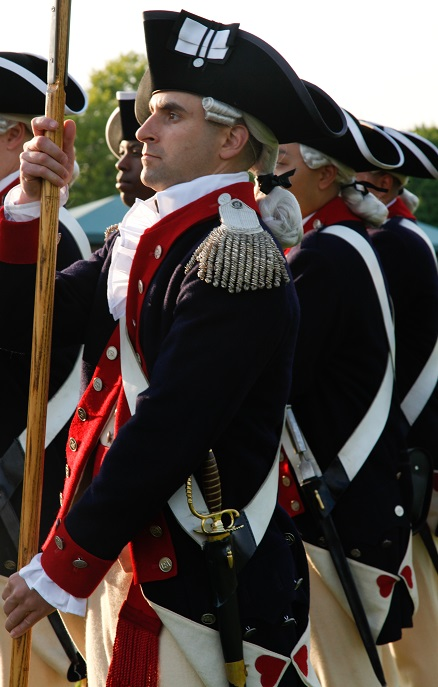
A member of the Commander-in-Chief's Guard (3rd Infantry Regiment) during the Twilight Tattoo

=== Asia ===
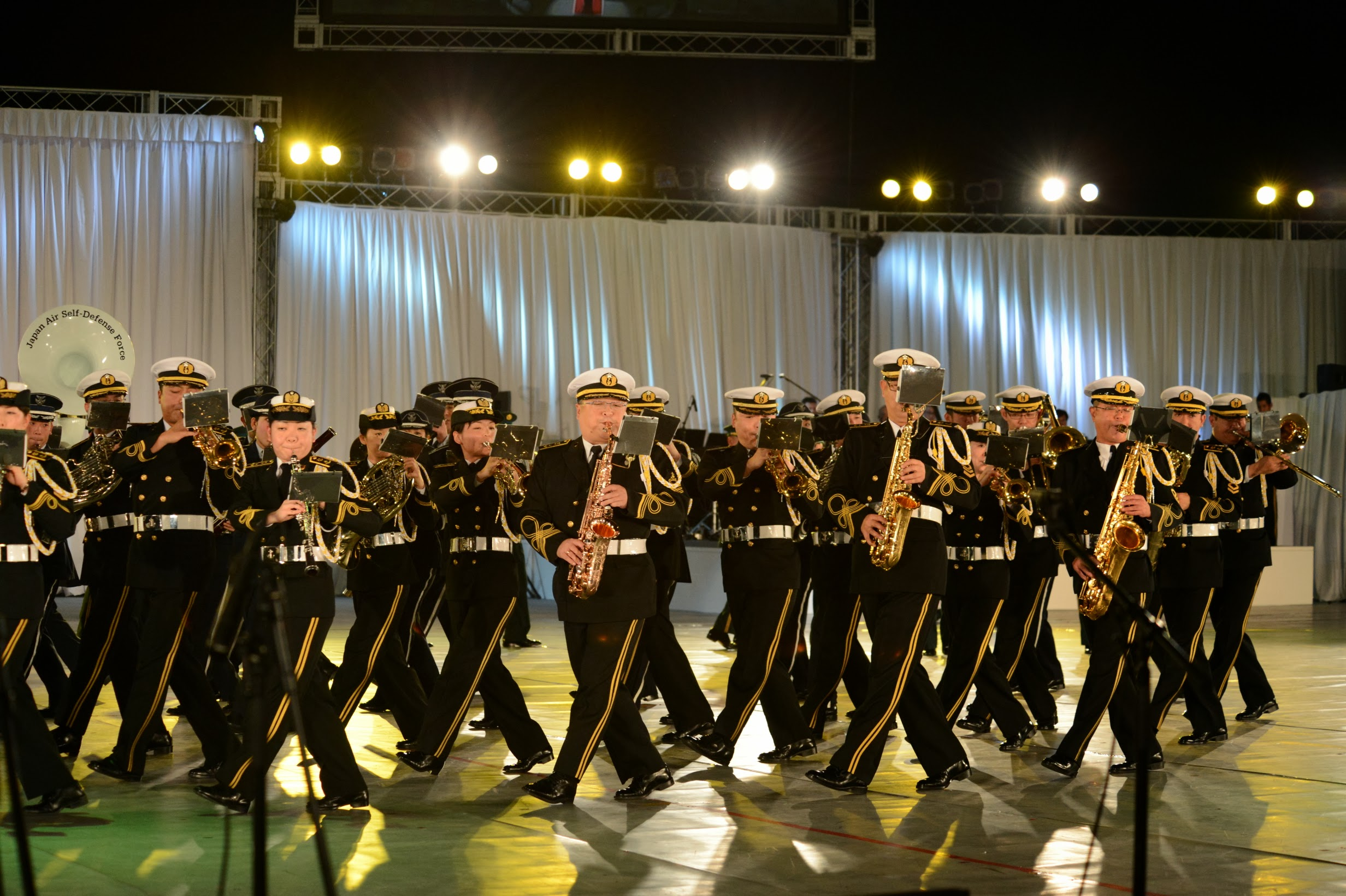
JSDF Marching Festival 2013

- Since 1963 the Japan Self-Defense Forces Marching Festival has been the country's military tattoo, featuring guest bands from the Asia–Pacific region and the bands of the service branches of the Japan Self-Defense Forces, plus its traditional drum teams. Held in the Nippon Budokan in Tokyo every November since its first edition, it is also Asia's oldest.
- The International Military Heritage Festival, organized by the Republic of Korea Armed Forces, is the national military tattoo of South Korea. Held every April in Seoul, it consists of performances from the military bands and drill teams of the ROKAF.
- Hong Kong held international military tattoo events both in 2012 and 2017, on the occasion of the 15th and the 20th anniversary of the return of Hong Kong to The People's Republic of China. The Military Band of the People's Liberation Army of China and the Hong Kong Police Band had essential roles to play. The performances also included military bands from Mongolia, The Netherlands, Russia, the United Kingdom (Scotland), and the United States.
- Military tattoo-style events have been held in Indonesia in the context of major city and municipal district anniversaries in the form of the visits by the corps of drums and drum and bugle corps of the Indonesian National Armed Forces and the Indonesian National Police, which are invited to march past and perform on local anniversaries and holidays. Often the ones frequently present in these tattoo-style events are the corps of drums of the military and police academies and the drum and bugle corps from the two military high schools in Magelang and Bandung, their appearances being a hit among the crowds attending these civic-military parades. A recent addition to these is the presence of the Corps of Drums of the Indonesian Army Officer Candidate School, also from Bandung. These events are also held within the academies' respective campuses during change of command, recognition and graduation parades as well as during their open house days, as well as during open days in military installations and anniversaries of the armed forces and police.
- Malaysia has held special military tattoos at the Stadium Merdeka in Kuala Lumpur as part of Visit Malaysia Year and in important anniversary years of national independence.
- In Kazakhstan, the most notable military tattoo is the Eskeri Kernei ("Military Trumpet") International Festival held on Capital City Day.

=== Africa ===
- At the 10th anniversary of the formation of the Rhodesian Light Infantry on 30 January 1971, a special commemorative military tattoo at Glamis Stadium in Salisbury was held. The tattoo, which was the first held by a single military unit in Rhodesia, saw the 1st Battalion spend three weeks rehearsing in terms of drilling, physical training and unarmed combat. a staged assault on a guerrilla camp was held by 2 Commando using blank ammunition and dummy mortars. The tattoo culminated with a sky-dive by three members of the Battalion Parachute Club. A retreat ceremony was held after as well as a final march-past by all participants.
- During the 40th anniversary of the Libyan Revolution celebrations in September 2009, a military tattoo was held at Green Square in Tripoli. Titled the World Military Music Festival, it was presided over by Mutassim Gaddafi (then Libya's National Security Advisor) and featured units from countries such as Russia, Algeria and Ethiopia.
- In 2018, the South African Tattoo was revived. The performance included members of the South African National Defence Force performing military drills and a mock battle, as well as the Johannesburg Youth Orchestra, a collection of both local and international dancing groups and a combined performance of many of the South African Highlander Bagpipe groups.

== See also ==
- Großer Zapfenstreich
- Military band
- Tattoo (bugle call)
