= HMS Collingwood =

Three ships and one shore establishment of the British Royal Navy have been named HMS Collingwood, after Admiral Cuthbert Collingwood, 1st Baron Collingwood:

- HMS Collingwood (1841), an 80-gun second-rate ship of the line, converted to screw propulsion in 1861, and sold in 1867
- HMS Collingwood (1882), the lead ship of the Admiral-class battleship in service from 1882 to 1909
- HMS Collingwood (1908), a St Vincent-class battleship, in action at Jutland, and sold for breaking up in 1922
- HMS Collingwood (shore establishment), the shore establishment of this name was formed in 1940 as an entry camp for new recruits. Since World War II it has housed a number of Royal Navy training units.

== Battle honours ==
- Jutland, 1916
- Atlantic, 1944 (Note: Awarded to the Royal Canadian Navy vessel HMCS Collingwood; this relates to previous practice where honours awarded to one ship were presented to ships of the same name in other Commonwealth royal navies.)
