= Michael Parker (event organiser) =

British businessman (1941–2022)

- Born: Michael John Parker; 21 September 1941; Fulmer, Buckinghamshire, England
- Died: 28 November 2022 (aged 81); Basingstoke, Hampshire, England
- Occupations: Organiser, businessman

Major Sir Michael John Parker, KCVO CBE (21 September 1941 – 28 November 2022) was a British businessman who was a leading producer of large-scale military tattoos and large-scale events in the United Kingdom and abroad.

== Early life and career ==
Michael John Parker was born in Fulmer, Buckinghamshire, England on 21 September 1941. He was educated at Dulwich Prep London and Hereford Cathedral School, Parker went to Royal Military Academy Sandhurst in 1959 and was commissioned into The Queen's Own Hussars. After a successful career in the Army he left in 1971, and has since been responsible for over 300 official national, international and royal occasions. Parker was producer of the Royal Tournament for 26 years, from 1974 to 1999. He also produced the Edinburgh Military Tattoo, from 1992 to 1994, as well as the Berlin Tattoo and Wembley Military Musical Pageant. In 2000 Parker produced the Royal Military Millennium Tattoo 2000 on Horse Guards Parade.

Parker previously worked on the Jubilee celebrations for HM The Queen in 1977, which included a nationwide chain of beacons throughout the country, the first being lit by The Queen at Windsor. In 2002 Parker produced the Golden Jubilee Weekend Festival at Buckingham Palace and in The Mall. Parker produced Queen Elizabeth The Queen Mother's 80th, 90th and 100th Birthday Celebrations.

He was made a Knight Commander of Royal Victorian Order on 3 August 2000 for his work as a producer for The Queen Mother Centenary Tribute.

Parker also produced 'The Great Event' in celebration of The Queen's 40th Anniversary in 1992, and 'The Royal Fireworks' on the eve of the wedding of Prince Charles and Lady Diana Spencer.

In 1995, Parker produced the 50th Anniversary of VE Day in Hyde Park and Buckingham Palace and a VJ 50th Commemoration on Horse Guards and Buckingham Palace.

Internationally Parker has produced a variety of large-scale events, including celebrations in Jordan for King Hussein and the Royal wedding of King Abdullah II. He has produced events in Europe, USA, China, Hong Kong, Saudi Arabia and Oman.

He was also the author of It’s All Going Terribly Wrong: The Accidental Showman, published by Bene Factum Publishing Ltd., London, published on 5 November 2012.

Parker was also a successful antique dealer.

== Personal life and death ==
Parker married Emma (née Gilroy) in 2005 and had a stepson, Oliver, who works in the theatre.

Parker died at Basingstoke and North Hampshire Hospital on 28 November 2022, at the age of 81.

== See also ==
- Military Tattoo
