= HMS Heron =

Several ships and a stone frigate of the Royal Navy has been named HMS Heron after the wading bird. Two shore establishments of the Royal Navy, used by the Fleet Air Arm, have borne the name HMS Heron II.

- HMS Heron (1804), an 18-gun 340-ton sloop purchased June 1804 (and previously named Jason). Renamed HMS Volcano in 1810 following conversion to a bomb vessel. Sold on 28 August 1816.
- HMS Heron (1812), a Cruizer-class brig-sloop originally to have been called HMS Rattlesnake and launched at Upnor, Kent on 22 October 1812, and broken up in March 1831.
- HMS Heron (1847), a 482-ton 16-gun brig launched at Chatham Dockyard on 27 September 1847 and lost at sea off West Africa on 9 May 1859.
- HMS Heron (1860), a wooden screw Albacore-class gunboat launched at Miller's Shipyard, Liverpool on 5 July 1860 and broken up in Jamaica in 1881.
- HMS Heron (1897), an 85-ton river gunboat equipped with two 2-pounder guns and constructed at Yarrow. Transferred to the Nigerian Government on 1 January 1899.
- HMS Heron was a 100-ton War Department tender originally called Empress. Following her transfer to the Royal Navy in 1906 she was renamed Heron. Sold in September 1923.
- HMS Heron was assigned to a 1,200-ton sloop, but the vessel had been renamed HMS Auckland by the time of her launch in 1938.
- HMS Heron (shore establishment) is the designation currently given to RNAS Yeovilton in Somerset, England
- HMS Heron II (1941 shore establishment), RNAS Haldon was a Royal Naval Air Station between 1941 and 1943, near Bishopsteignton, Devon.
- HMS Heron II (1943 shore establishment), RNAS Charlton Horethorne was a Royal Naval Air Station between 1943 and 1945, located at Charlton Horethorne, Dorset.
