= Royal Nova Scotia International Tattoo =

Annual military show in Nova Scotia, Canada

- Abbreviation: RNSIT
- Formation: 1979
- Type: Organizations based in Canada with royal patronage
- Legal status: active
- Purpose: advocate and public voice, educator and network
- Location: Halifax
- Official language: English, French
- Patron: His Majesty The King
- Website: https://nstattoo.ca

The Royal Nova Scotia International Tattoo is a show inspired by Military Tattoos given by military bands and display teams. It has taken place annually in the capital of Nova Scotia, Halifax since 1979. It is currently held in the Halifax Scotiabank Centre.

== Background ==
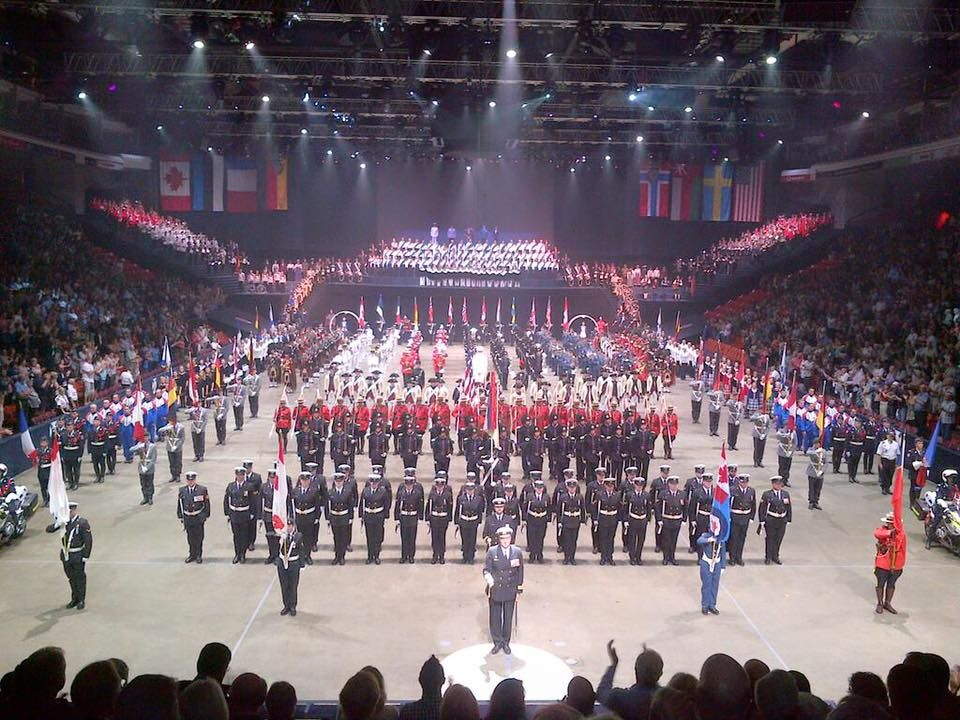
2015 Royal Nova Scotia International Tattoo.

The Royal Nova Scotia International Tattoo is unique among other Tattoos in the world in that it is more theatrical in nature with a mixture of both military and civilian performers.

It takes place in the Scotiabank Centre arena, a venue that, to some degree, resembles a traditional theatre in the round. The show is heavily costumed and intensively rehearsed with technical staff, choreographers, assistant directors, wardrobe staff and designers as part of the production team, which also sets it apart from traditional Tattoos.

A recurring theme of Bond of Friendship is woven into the Nova Scotia Tattoo each year that is intended to confirm and to build international relationships. Additional themes, usually connected with military anniversaries, are added each year.

The show has been seen by well over 2,000,000 spectators and has hosted tens of thousands of performers from 21 countries. In terms of annual economic impact, it generates tens of millions for the Province of Nova Scotia and the Halifax Regional Municipality.

The Tattoo is presented by the Royal Nova Scotia International Tattoo Society, which is supported by subsidies and in-kind support from the Government of Canada, the Province of Nova Scotia, the Canadian Forces, the Royal Canadian Mounted Police, the Halifax Regional Municipality and the Corporate Community.

Run mainly by volunteers, the Royal Nova Scotia International Tattoo is a registered charity of Canada.

== History ==
The word Tattoo is derived from Dutch doe den tap toe (translated to turn off the taps). In 17th century Dutch villages when British soldiers were required back at their barracks, a drummer would march through the streets playing the drumbeat doe den tap toe.

While the first Nova Scotia Tattoo actually took place in 1979, the event that had the greatest impact on the Nova Scotia Tattoo was the Canadian Armed Forces Tattoo. As part of the Centennial Celebrations, the 1967 Canadian Armed Forces Tattoo was the largest touring show ever presented in the world. Beginning in the summer of 1967, when it was part of Canada's centennial celebrations, the Canadian Armed Forces Tattoo made stops in Victoria, Vancouver, Hamilton, Ottawa, Toronto and Montreal. The tour continued for a total of eight months.

An officer with the Black Watch, Ian Fraser, had had experience working on Tattoos because of the Soldiers of the Queen production that had been put together in 1959 at Gagetown, NB. Fraser was called to Ottawa from the Staff College in India in order to produce the Canadian Armed Forces Tattoo.

From that successful show, Fraser was once again called upon in 1979 to mark the visit to Nova Scotia of Her Majesty Queen Elizabeth The Queen Mother by organizing a Tattoo for the International Gathering of the Clans. This would be the first time the International Gathering of the Clans would take place outside Scotland. Fraser was commanded to organize the show in six months.

After the 1979 debut, the provincial government established the Nova Scotia Tattoo as a permanent tourist attraction. This show evolved into a cultural fixture and economically important nine-day production; a mainstay in the Halifax Regional Municipality.

In recognition of how much the 1979 show had evolved on an international level, in 1988 the name was formally changed to The Nova Scotia International Tattoo.

On May 4, 2006, it was announced that the Tattoo had received the designation "Royal" from Queen Elizabeth II. The announcement was made at Government House in Nova Scotia by Lieutenant-Governor Myra Freeman.

== Controversy ==
Tattoo organizers ignited a controversy in 2010 when Queen Elizabeth II canceled a special Royal Tour appearance at the Tattoo because the event organizers, citing safety reasons, refused to allow her to climb up a set of steps on the Tattoo stage. The steps were theatrical stairs and very steep with no railing.

=== Arms ===
Coat of arms of Royal Nova Scotia International Tattoo

Notes
Granted 20 June 2003.
Crest
A demi lion Azure holding a banner of the Arms.
Escutcheon
Azure fretty of bendlets Argent and bendlets sinister Or.
Supporters
Two unicorns Or armed crined and unguled Argent standing on a compartment of mayflowers and thistle flowers Proper.

== See also ==
- List of Canadian organizations with royal patronage
- Monarchy of Canada
- Quebec City International Festival of Military Bands
