= Royal Tournament =

Former military tattoo in the UK

The Royal Tournament
- Status: Defunct
- Genre: Military tattoo
- Frequency: Annual
- Venue: Royal Agricultural Hall (1880); Olympia London (1900s–1949); Earls Court Exhibition Centre (1950–1999)
- Country: United Kingdom
- Founded: 1880
- Most recent: 1999

The Royal Tournament was the world's largest military tattoo and pageant, held by the British Armed Forces annually between 1880 and 1999. The venue was originally the Royal Agricultural Hall, before moving to Olympia London and latterly the Earls Court Exhibition Centre. In its later years it also acted as a fundraising event for leading forces charities, such as The Royal British Legion.

== History ==
The Grand Military Tournament and Assault at Arms was held at the former Royal Agricultural Hall, in Islington from 21 to 26 June 1880. The Tournament was effectively a series of competitions contested by the officers and men of the regular and auxiliary units of the British Army. Although crowds didn’t flock to the Tournament in the first year, it was held again in 1881 and subsequent years.

More events to please audiences were added, including music from military bands, re-enactments, Musical Rides by the Cavalry and Musical Drives by the Artillery. Crowds began to flock to performances at the Agricultural hall; during the early 1900s the show outgrew its home and moved to the west London venue of Olympia. The Royal Navy and the Royal Air Force also participated. The show was renamed a number of times until it finally became the Royal Tournament.

== Post World War II ==
After the Second World War, the Tournament once again moved to a larger stage and opened its doors to the public at the Earls Court Exhibition Centre in 1950. With the exception of the war years, the Tournament was staged every summer from 1880 to 1999. The Royal Tournament was the first and biggest Military Tattoo in the World. Towards the end ticket sales were insufficient to cover costs; the 1998 Royal Tournament made a loss. On Monday 2 August 1999, the Royal Tournament closed for the final time to reduce military costs, following the 1998 Strategic Defence Review.

== The British Military Tournament ==
In June 2010, the Army Benevolent Fund announced that a new event, to be called the British Military Tournament, would be held over the weekend of 4–5 December 2010, bringing together the "best elements of the Royal Tournament", including the King's Troop, Royal Horse Artillery's Musical Drive, and the Royal Navy Field gun competition. The two themes of the event as announced were the 350th anniversary of the Household Cavalry, and the 150th anniversary of both the Army Physical Training Corps and the cadet movement. Initially, only the Army was to participate (with Navy or RAF presence only in old staples such as the Field Gun competition). Press reports suggested that the event might have later been held annually, "hosted" by the different services in turn.

The British Military Tournament was held four times, the 2013 Tournament being the last.

== See also ==
- King's Troop, Royal Horse Artillery
- Field gun competition
- Birmingham Tattoo
- Honourable Artillery Company
