= Birmingham Tattoo =

Annual military tattoo in Birmingham, England

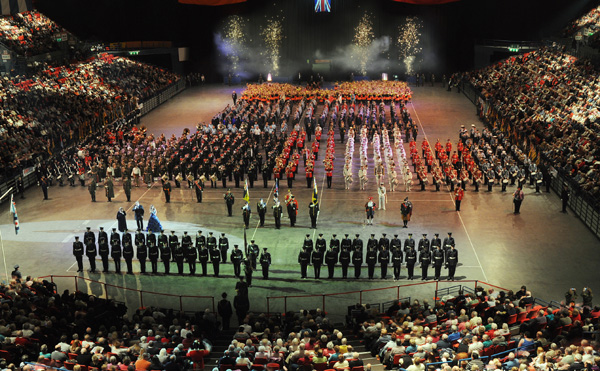
Birmingham International Tattoo

The Birmingham Tattoo is held annually at the Resorts World Arena, in Birmingham, England. The military tattoo features massed military bands, and displays. The event takes place for two performances in February each year. The event has been held since 1989 and has attracted performers from the United States, Europe and Russia as well as British bands from the Royal Marines, Coldstream Guards, King's Division and Gurkhas. The Birmingham Tattoo features traditional military music, field gun racing, dancers, dog display teams and one of the largest gatherings of standard bearers with around 100 standards on parade at each performance. Each year the event raises money at each performance for the Royal Star and Garter Homes who provide care homes for disabled ex-Service men and women. Over £126,000 has been donated to the charity since 2008.
