= Norwegian Military Tattoo =

Military festival

The Norwegian Military Tattoo (Norsk Militær Tattoo) is a military festival held biannually in the Norwegian capital of Oslo. It is organized by the Forsvarets musikk, the department that oversees all the country's military bands (musikkorps). The first tattoo was held in 1994 in Hamar, which is north of Oslo. The tattoo has been held in the Oslo Spektrum since 1996. It features military bands and drill teams of the Norwegian Armed Forces (such as the band and honour guard of Hans Majestet Kongens Garde) as well as the bands and drill teams of foreign countries.

With over 800 participants on stage, the Norwegian Military Tattoo is Norway's largest indoor show. The tattoo's official TV partner is NRK1. The director of the Norwegian Military Tattoo from 1995 to 2014 was Colonel Christer Johannesen, a former music inspector in the Armed Forces.

== Notable participants ==
- For a complete overwiev, please visit: Norsk Militær Tattoo
- Queen's Colour Squadron
- United States Army Field Band
- Old Guard Fife and Drum Corps
- Fanfare Band of the Royal Marechaussee
- Staff Band of the Bundeswehr
- Wachbataillon Drill Team
- United States Air Force Honor Guard Drill Team
- Republic of Korea Armed Forces Traditional Daechwita Band
- Oslo Philharmonic Choir
- New Guard America
