= Forsvarets musikk =

Government Department

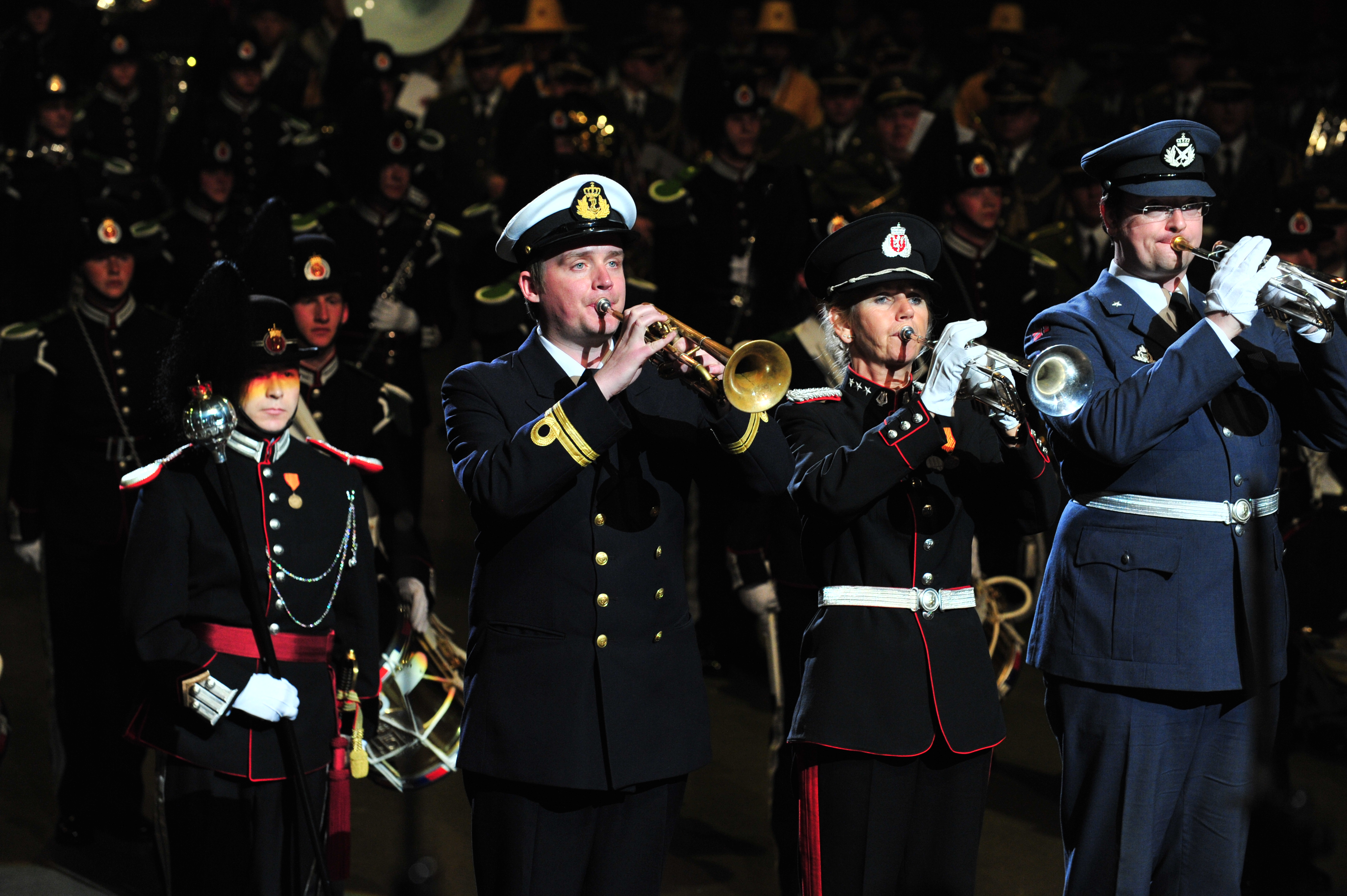
Musicians from three Norwegian service branches performing for military service members.

Forsvarets Musikk (FMUS) (English: Defence Music) is the department that oversee all the military bands (musikkorps) of the Norwegian Armed Forces (Forsvarets). Being the organizational body of military bands, it is based in Oslo, the national capital.

Music Bands in the Norwegian Armed Forces:

- Staff Band of the Norwegian Armed Forces
- Royal Norwegian Navy Band
- Norwegian Air Force Band
- Hans Majestet Kongens Garde Band and Drill Team Company
- Norwegian Army Band, Northern Norway
- Norwegian Army Band, Western Norway (also known as the Norwegian Armed Forces Band)
- Oslo Home Guard Band

1887 marked the first proposals for a military musical department. At that time, the bands were approved by a veto by King Oscar II, following a defense by music inspector Major Ole Olsen. The musical department, on financial grounds, re-organized the bands from the divisional from 1927 to 1933. As of 1954, there were seven military bands authorized by the Norwegian Parliament (Storting) with permanently employed musicians. A Norwegian public inquiry from 1978 stated that musikkorps should remain which led to the Defense Music in its current form being established from proposals No. 52 and 19 by the parliament adopted between 1992 and 1993. Two of these were dissolved in the early 21st century after the Eastern Norway Defense District Music Band in Halden and the Sørlandet Defense District Music Band in Kristiansand ceased to exist as of 31 December 2002. Since the 2000s the music division has undergone many organizational changes coinciding with the restructuring of the Norwegian Armed Forces.

Its bands provide honors for the Norwegian members of the House of Glücksburg, the Government of Norway, and the Armed Forces. It also sponsors and organizes events such as the Norwegian Military Tattoo. The department reports directly to the Armed Forces' Department of Culture and Tradition (FAKT), which embraces all the cultural units in the military. The department provides most of the repertoire for Norwegian military bands, all of which are suited for all types of music despite being wind bands.
