= His Majesty the King's Guard 3rd Company =

His Majesty the King’s Guard 3. Company
- Hans Majestet Kongens 3. Gardekompani
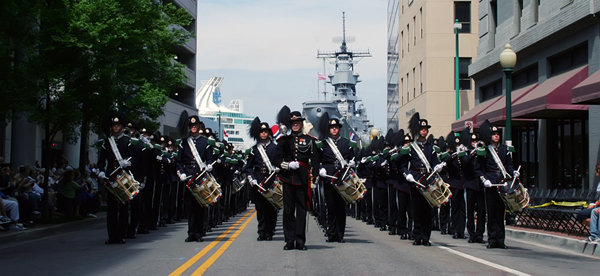
- The company band during a parade in Norfolk during the Virginia International Tattoo in May 2009.
- Active: 1856–present
- Country: Norway
- Branch: Norwegian Army
- Type: Military band
- Size: Company (3 Platoons)
- Part of: Hans Majestet Kongens Garde
- Garrison/HQ: Huseby Leir, Oslo
- Nicknames: The Band and Drill Company
- Mottos: Rytme, eleganse, presisjon (Rhythm, elegance, precision)

Commanders
- Director of Music/Commanding Officer: N/A
- Ceremonial chief: HM Harald V of Norway

The His Majesty the King's Guard 3. Company (Norwegian: Hans Majestet Kongens 3. Gardekompani) is a renowned military band and drill unit the Norwegian Armed Forces. It is attached to the Hans Majestet Kongens Garde or The King's Guard, acting as its unit band and drill team. The band and drill unit is based out of Huseby Leir in the capital Oslo where its area of responsibility is. It is a renowned unit that is famous around the world for its participation in international military tattoos. In its activities, it participates in parades and ceremonies for HM Harald V of Norway) and Norwegian members of the House of Glücksburg. It also supports the government and the military, specifically increasing the esprit de corps in army units as well as in the public. The concert season usually lasts from December to March/April while the marching season lasts until September.

== History ==
When the King's Guard was established in Stockholm in 1856, three buglers were ordered to play camp signals. Later, musicians interested in military music and joined the rapidly growing group of musicians on duty. At the time, it only served as the entertainment for the Huseby Leir, or as a ceremonial music band in the drill area. The drill unit made its breakthrough after first attending the Scottish-organized Royal Edinburgh Military Tattoo in 1961.

After the drill programs were incorporated into the service in 1961, it became more difficult to carry out the required signal assignments as drummers, buglers and trumpet players from the corps took care of these assignments in addition to drill training and music drills. Therefore, the Band Corps was established in 1962 and then divided into the main marching band and a drum, bugle and trumpet corps playing snare drums, bugles and fanfare trumpets. In previous years, the troops in the 3rd Guard Company were part of the 5th Guard Company, but became a separate company from 1 August 2003. In 2018, the main corps was named Janitsjar Corps to equate the corps more.

== Band ==
Being the most visible part of the company, the band provides musical accompaniment for all state ceremonies foreign and domestic. Everyone who enters the band must audition prior to joining, which are usually held in the spring. It is an integral part of the Norwegian Military Tattoo, which it participates in due to it being part of the Forsvarets musikk (English: Defence Music). Uniquely, the band consists of about 50% conscript women musicians and field musicians, compared to 17% in the rest of the armed forces. Signal Corps buglers are constantly on guard duty at the Royal Palace and as weekly ceremonial buglers (UKHB) in Huseby Leir. They have the responsibility to play bugle calls during the raising and lowering of the Flag of Norway, the start of lunch and during the mail rounds for the battalion.

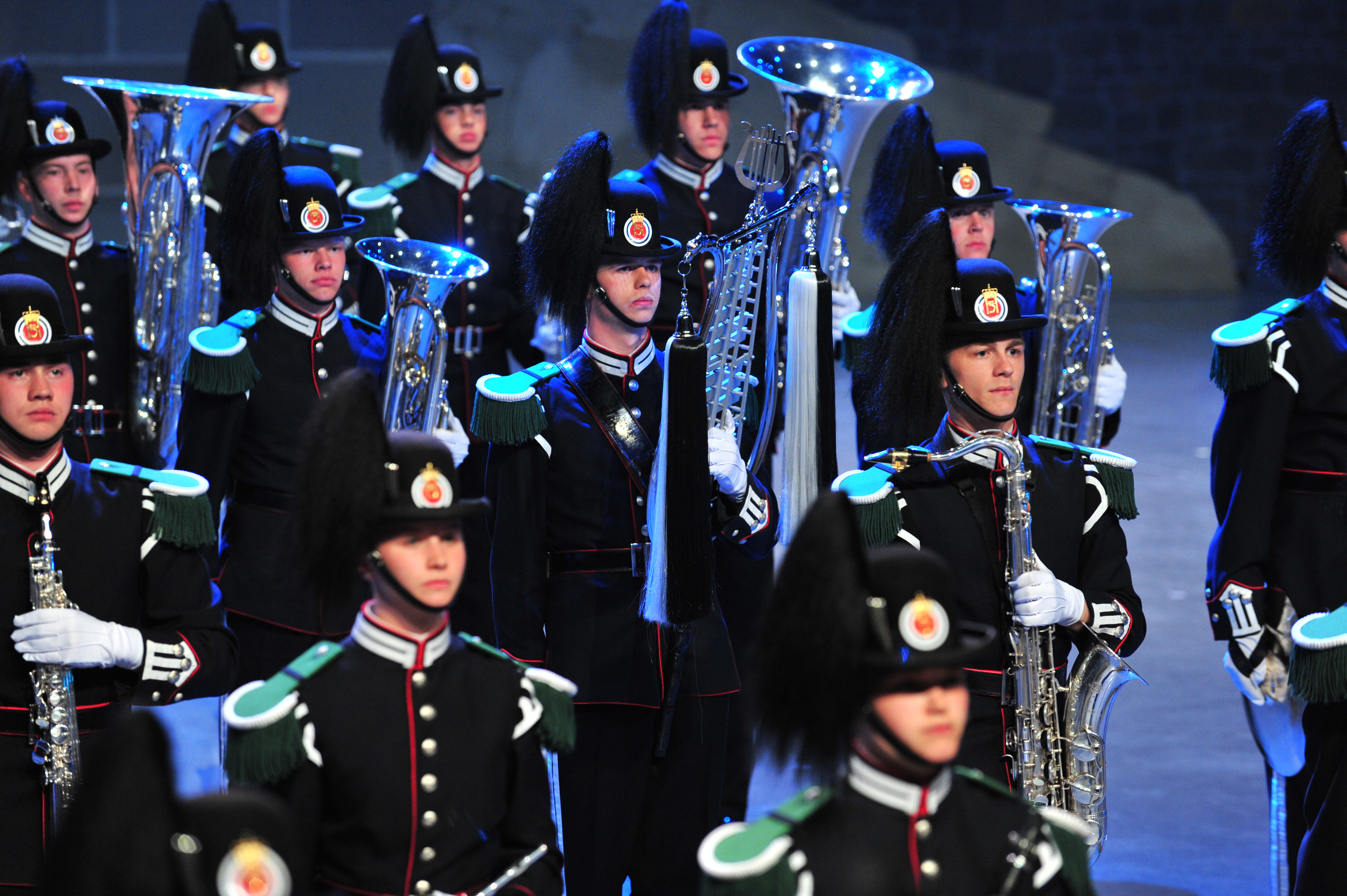
The unit in May 2012.

On occasion, veteran musicians can be called into service to reinforce the band.

== Drill Unit ==
The 40-member drill unit is the official parade and exhibition drill unit of the battalion. During the 2-month training and selection process of the unit, close attention is paid to the basic drill movements of members. The main requirements of the drill unit is a minimum height of 170 cm, good physical shape and a good rhythmic coordination ability. The unit will more often than not be performing alongside the band as it rarely performs by itself. It commonly performs precision drill and ceremony routines at various army barracks such as Bardufoss Leir. During these visits, it commonly performs a 20-25 minute drill routine which includes solo drill and a merged drill routine with the band.

== The Norwegian Guard Veterans Band and Drill Team ==
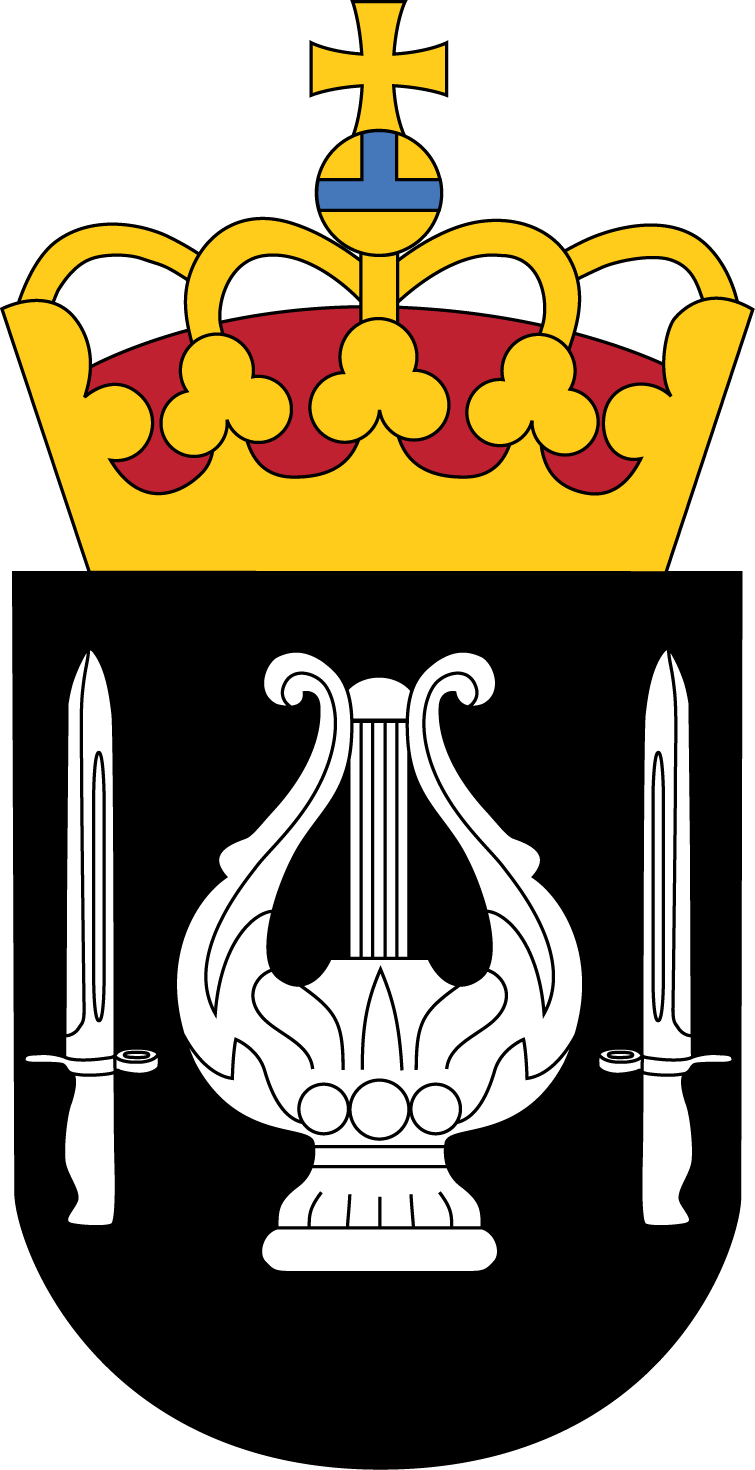
The contingent emblem

The Norwegian Guard Veterans Band and Drill Team (Norwegian: Norske Gardeveteraners Drillkontingent, NGD) is an affiliated civilian organization for veterans who have served in the King's Guard. In 1984, the Norwegian Guard Musicians' Association (NGMF) was created by former guardsmen to support and promote band and drill company financially and by giving them publicity. A music band as formed among the rank and file in 1986 which formed a separate organization: Norwegian Guard Musicians' Federation Corps, which was merged into today's NGD in 2011. They use historical uniforms similar to those used by the King's Guard from around 1870 to the Second World War. The uniform was approved by King Olav in the Council of Ministers in the autumn of 1986. They are also armed with M1 Garands.

== Leadership ==
=== Company Command ===
The Company Staff in the 3rd Company consists of 3 or 4 soldiers who perform the following functions:

- Company management
- Accounting for all instruments
- Musical training
- Archiving sheet music files
- Adjust the training schedule to the company's needs
- Setting dates for events

The staff supports the commander and the rest of the company, and is most often visible during the missions when they stand up and answer questions from the audience. During their first tour of duty, the soldiers can apply for staff positions by enrolling in the King's Guard as an enlisted soldier.

=== Music Director ===
The post of music director of the band is the commanding officer for band. He/she marches at the head of the formation and conducts it while marching.

== Gallery ==
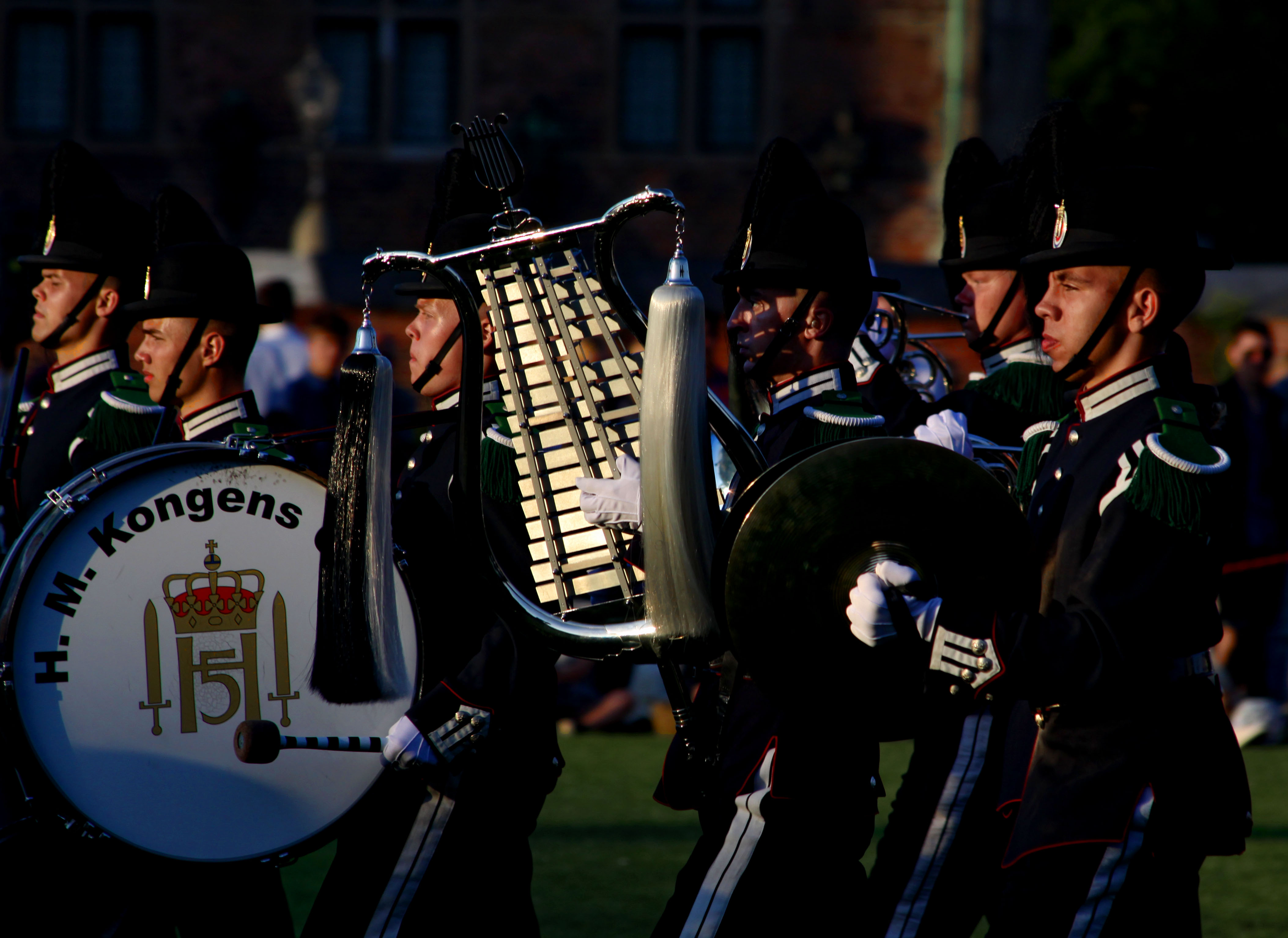
At the Livgarde Tattoo in Denmark.

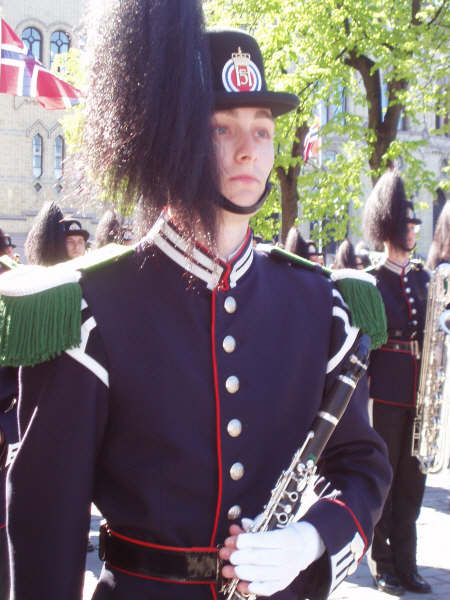
A musician from the band.

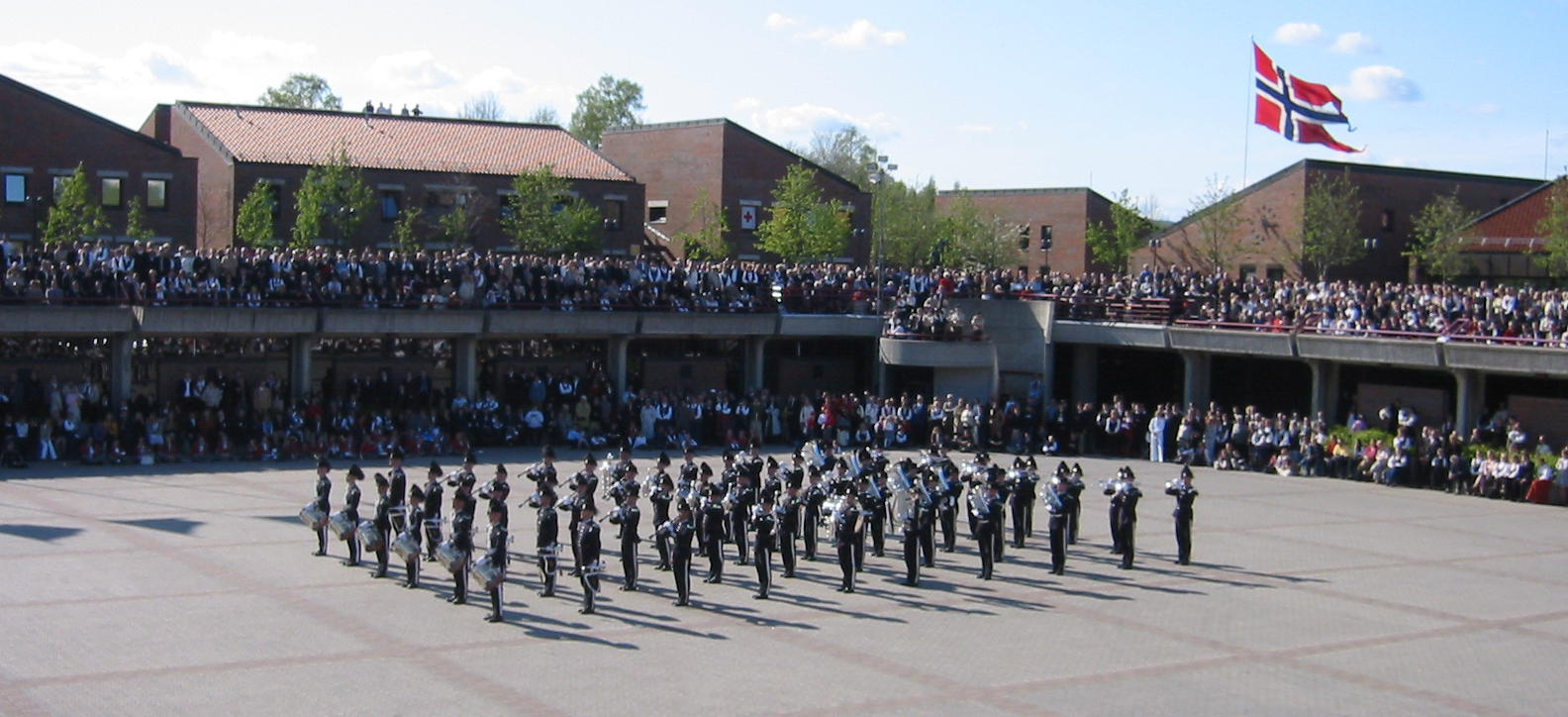
The band at Huseby Leir

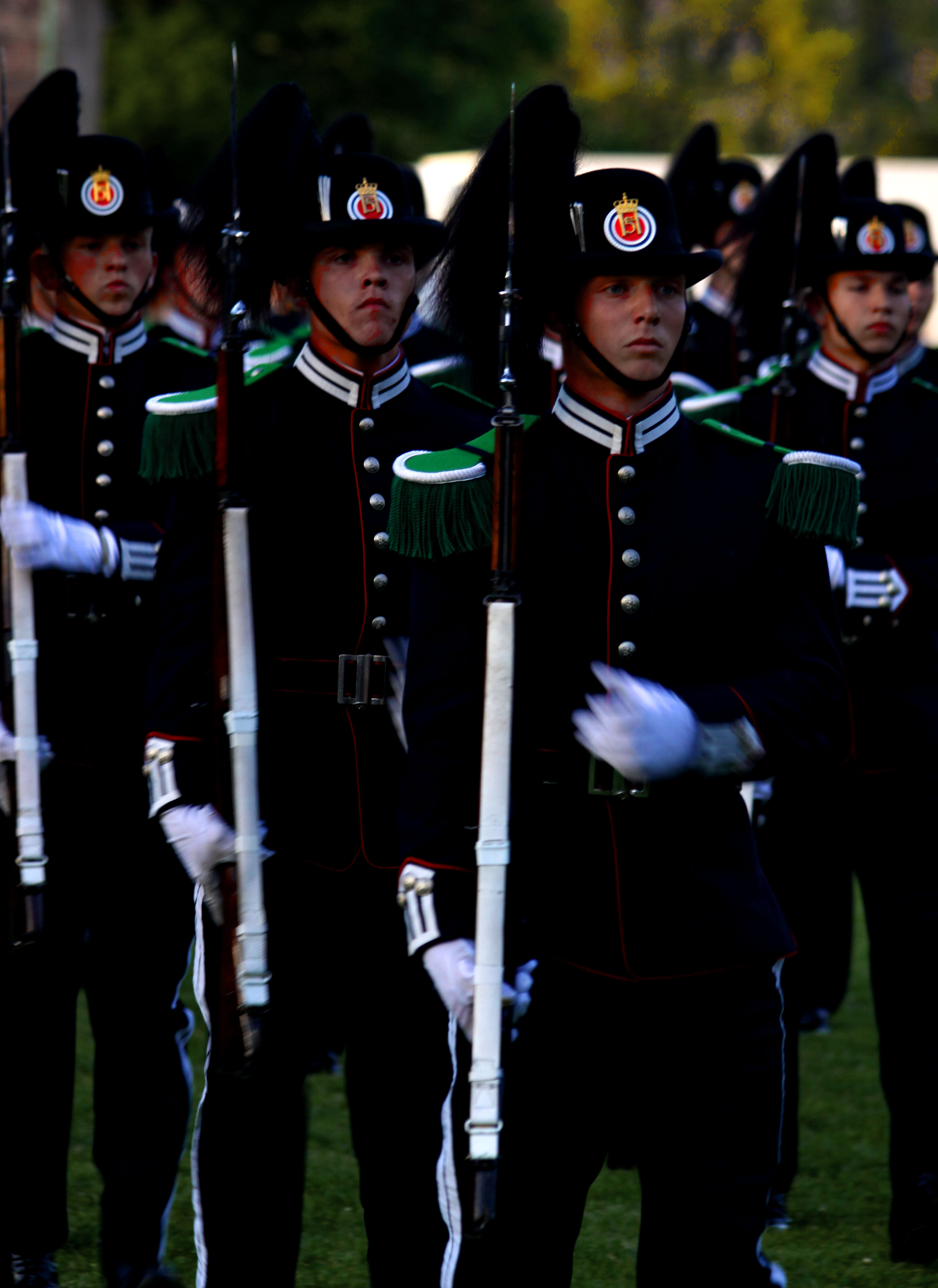
The Drill Platoon at the Tattoo of Den Kongelige Livgarde (the Royal Danish Guard)

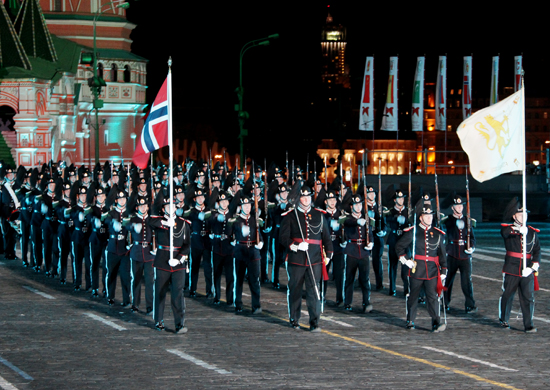
At the Spasskaya Tower Military Music Festival and Tattoo
