= Nils Olav =

King penguin

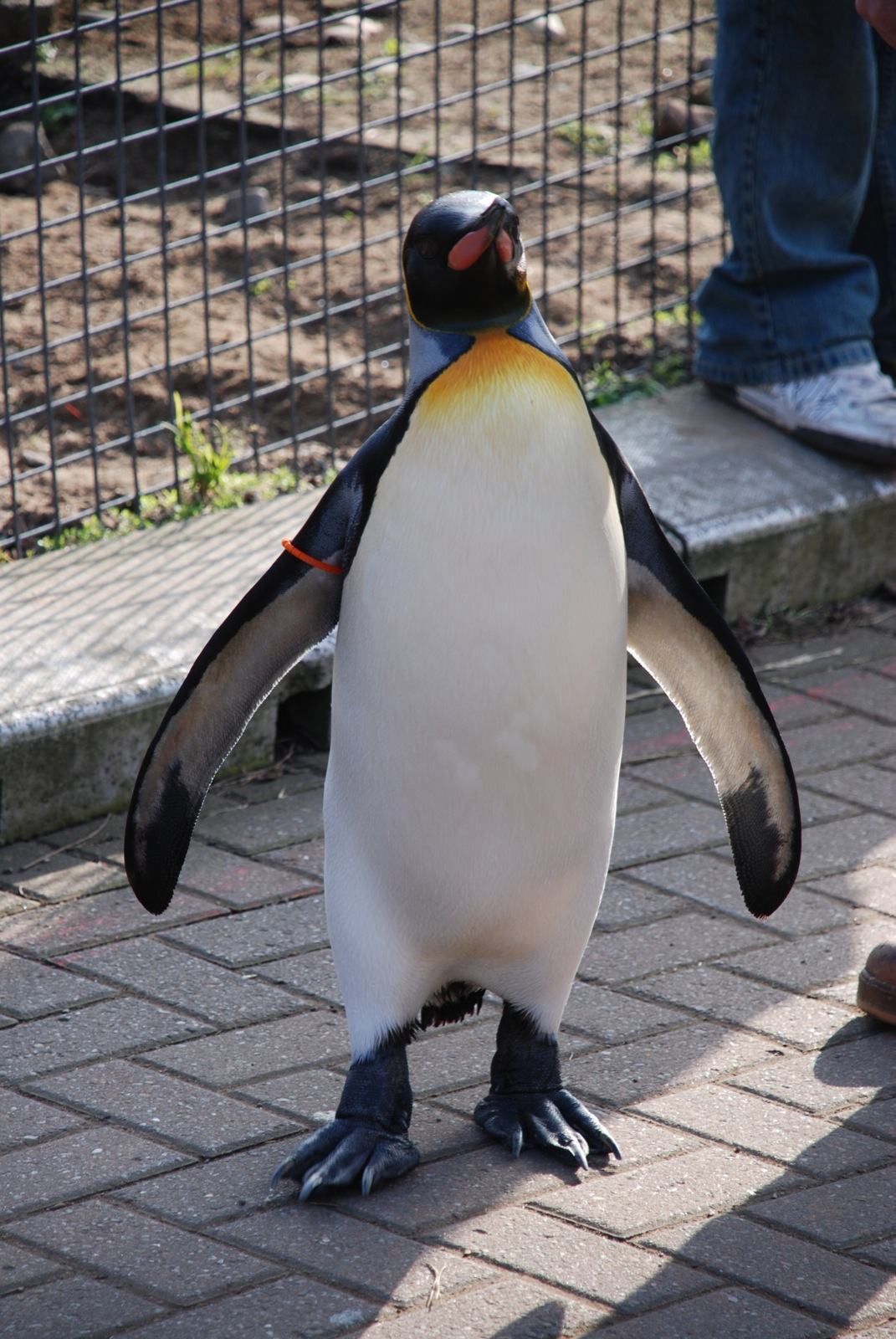
- Nils Olav II in 2008
- Species: King penguin (Aptenodytes patagonicus)
- Sex: Male
- Hatched: Edinburgh, Scotland
- Residence: Edinburgh Zoo
- Named after: Nils Egelien and Olav Siggerud
- Military career
- Allegiance: Norway
- Branch: Norwegian Army
- Service years: 1972–1987 (first); 1987 – after 2008 (second); before 2016 – present (third)
- Rank: Major General
- Units: His Majesty the King's Guard (mascot and colonel-in-chief)

Major General Sir Nils Olav III (Norwegian: [ˌnɪls ˈûːlɑv]), Baron of Bouvet Island, is a king penguin who resides in Edinburgh Zoo, Scotland. He is the mascot and colonel-in-chief of the Norwegian King's Guard. The name "Nils Olav" and associated ranks have been passed down through three king penguins since 1972, the current holder being Nils Olav III.

== History ==
The family of Norwegian shipping magnate Christian Salvesen gave a king penguin to Edinburgh Zoo when the zoo opened in 1913.

When the Norwegian King's Guard (HMKG) visited the Edinburgh Military Tattoo of 1961 for a drill display, a lieutenant named Nils Egelien became interested in the zoo's penguin colony. When the King's Guard returned to Edinburgh in 1972, Egelien arranged for the regiment to adopt a penguin. This penguin was named Nils Olav in honour of Nils Egelien, commander of the drill platoon, and Olav Siggerud, contingent commander of HMKG in 1972.

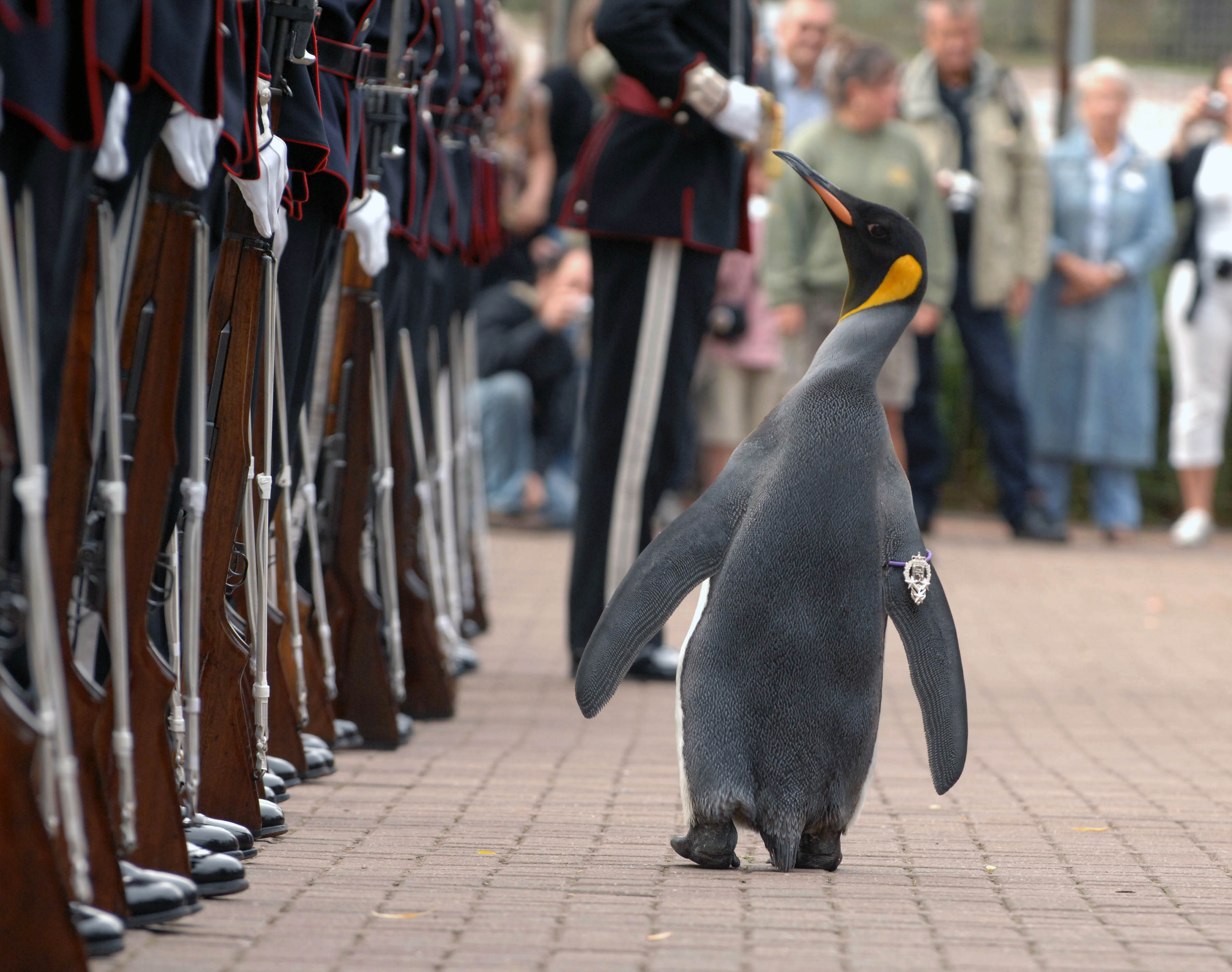
Sir Nils inspects troops of the King's Guard, of which he is colonel-in-chief, following his knighthood ceremony in 2008. Military insignia is attached to his right flipper.

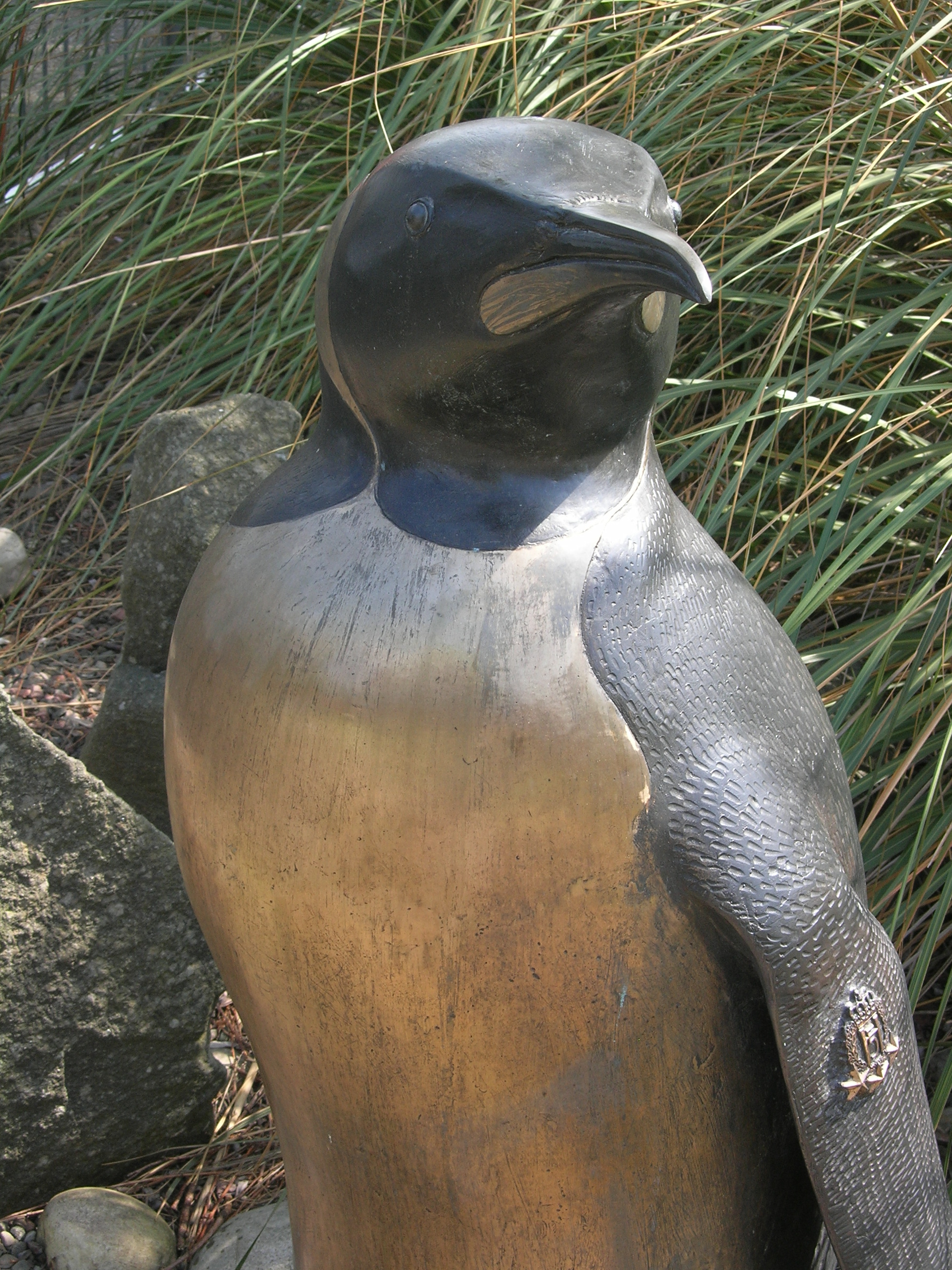
The bronze statue of Nils Olav

Nils Olav was initially given the rank of visekorporal (lance corporal) in the battalion. He has been promoted each time the King's Guard has returned to the zoo. He was made a corporal in 1982, then promoted to sergeant in 1987. Nils Olav I died shortly after his promotion to sergeant in 1987, and his place was taken by Nils Olav II, a two-year-old near-double. He was promoted in 1993 to the rank of regimental sergeant major and in 2001 promoted to "honourable regimental sergeant major". On 18 August 2005, he was appointed as colonel-in-chief of the same regiment. During the 2005 visit, a 4-foot-high (1.2 m) bronze statue of Nils Olav was presented to Edinburgh Zoo. The statue's inscription includes references to both the King's Guard and to the Military Tattoo. A statue also stands at the King's Guard compound at Huseby, Oslo.

The next honour was a knighthood, awarded during a visit by soldiers from the Norwegian King's Guard on 15 August 2008. The knighthood was approved by King Harald V and Nils was the first penguin to receive such an honour in the Norwegian Army. During the ceremony a crowd of several hundred people watched the 130 guardsmen on parade at the zoo, and a citation from the King was read out, which described Nils as a penguin "in every way qualified to receive the honour and dignity of knighthood".

A third penguin, Nils Olav III, took over at some point between 2008 and 2016. On 22 August 2016 he was promoted to brigadier in a ceremony attended by more than 50 members of the King's Guard. On 21 August 2023 he was promoted to major general. Nils Olav is recognised by Guinness World Records as the highest-ranking penguin.

Nils Olav outranked the human Nils Egelien from 2005 until Egelien died on 11 December 2020, aged 87.

== See also ==
- Foo Foo (dog)
- List of animals in political office
- List of individual birds
- William Windsor (goat)
- Wojtek (bear)
