= Ole Edvard Antonsen =

Norwegian trumpeter, musician and conductor

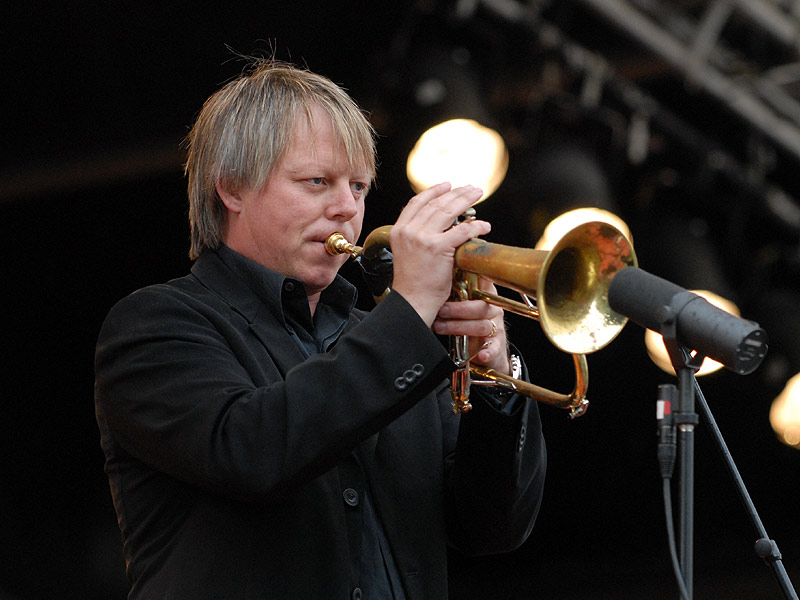
Ole Edvard Antonsen at the StatoilHydro free concert in Stavanger 2008.

Ole Edvard Antonsen (born 25 April 1962) is a Norwegian trumpeter, musician and conductor.

== Life and career ==
Antonsen was born in Vang Municipality (now part of Hamar Municipality). He is best known as a solo trumpeter, active in different genres of music; classical music, chamber music, baroque, jazz and pop. Since the mid-2000s, he has also been active as a conductor, foremost with Norwegian Air Force Band.

== Discography ==
- 1989 The Virtuoso Trumpet – (with Einar Henning Smebye on piano)
- 1992 Tour De Force
- 1993 Trumpet Concertos – (with English Chamber Orchestra and conductor Jeffrey Tate)
- 1994 Popular Pieces for Trumpet & Organ – (with Wayne Marshall on organ)
- 1995 Shostakovich Concerto for Piano and Trumpet – (with Berlin Philharmonic Orchestra, conductor Mariss Jansons and Mikhail Rudy on piano)
- 1997 Read My Lips
- 1998 Twentieth Century Trumpet – (with Wolfgang Sawallisch on piano)
- 2000 New Sound of Baroque – (with his brother Jens Petter Antonsen (trumpet) and TrondheimSolistene)
- 2002 Ars Nova – (with Solveig Kringlebotn (vocals) and Wolfgang Plagge on piano)
- 2007 Nordic Trumpet Concertos (with Nordic Chamber Orchestra, Christian Lindberg, conductor)
- 2007 The Golden Age of the Cornet (with the Royal Norwegian Navy Band and conductor Ingar Bergby)
- 2008 Landscapes

=== As a sideman (selection) ===
- 2002 With Strings Attached – Willem Breuker Kollektief
- 2003 Jan van der Roost In Flanders' Fields Vol.39 – Jan van der Roost
- 2004 Absolute – Spanish Brass Luur Metalls
- 2004 Frelsesarmeens Juleplate (The Norwegian Salvation Army Christmas album with Nidaros Cathedral Boys' Choir)
- 2011 Mitt lille land, with other artists

== On YouTube ==
- Masterclass with Ole Edvard Antonsen, HMT Rostock on YouTube
- Ole Edvard Antonsen - Napoli on YouTube
- オーレ・エドヴァルド・アントンセン＆ウェイン・マーシャル Ole Edvard Antonsen (Tp)&Wayne Marshall (Org) on YouTube
- Ole Edvard Antonsen - Badinerie (J.S.Bach) on YouTube
- Ole Edvard Antonsen Trumpet Concert in Japan on YouTube
- Vidda - Ole Edvard Antonsen (Official Video) on YouTube
- ‘Vidda’ - Ole Edvard Antonsen - Prinsens Musikkorps on YouTube
- Ole Edvard Antonsen (Spellemannsprisen 1987) on YouTube
- Ole Edvard Antonsen - "Mikkel" on YouTube
- Ole Edvard Antonsen - Albinoni Bb op7 no3 on YouTube
- Ole Edvard Antonsen - Haydn: 3rd mov from trumpet concerto in Eb on YouTube
- Tico Tico - Ole Edvard Antonsen - Prinsens Musikkorps on YouTube

== Charts ==
Norwegian chart (1992)	Peak position
Tour De Force	1
Norwegian chart (1993)	Peak position
Tour De Force	6
Norwegian chart (1997)	Peak position
Read My Lips	7
Norwegian chart (1998)	Peak position
Read My Lips	12

Preceded by Knut Reiersrud	Recipient of the Spellemannprisen Open class 1992	Succeeded by Mari Boine
