= Norwegian Air Force Band =

Military band of the Royal Norwegian Air Force

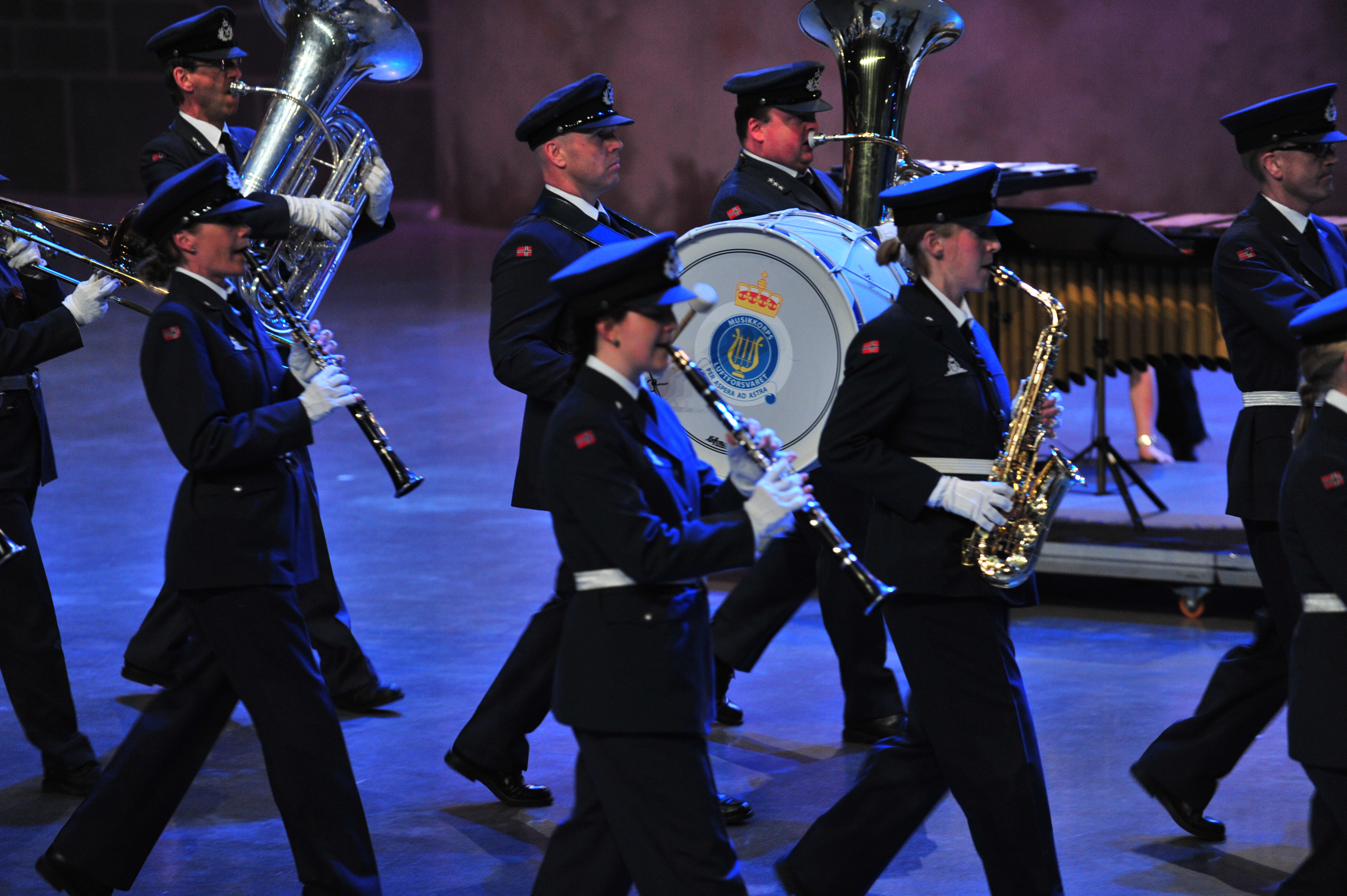
The band during the 100th anniversary of the Norwegian Air Force.

The Norwegian Air Force Band (Norwegian: Luftforsvarets musikkorps, LFMK) is the official military band of the Royal Norwegian Air Force, based out of Trondheim, a municipality in the Trondheim Region. The band consists of 28 professional musicians who are employed by the Forsvarets musikk. The band participates in parades and ceremonies in the Trondheim Region and performs for Norwegian royalty and the government on behalf of the RNoAF. The RNoAF Band also supports and cooperates closely with the Royal Norwegian Air Force Academy and Ørland Main Air Station. Leif Arne Pedersen has been employed since autumn 2011 as the band's Artistic director and chief conductor, succeeding Ole Edvard Antonsen who had served in this role from 2006–2010. The Administrative Chief and General Manager of the LFMK is Colonel Lieutenant Marius Johansen.

The corps was established in 1818 as the 5th Brigades Music Band and belonged to the Norwegian Army until 2006. In connection with the fact that in 1918, the Army was reorganized to form brigades to divisions, the band changed its name to the 5th Division Music Corps. In 1953, it changed its name again to the Armed Forces Trøndelag District Music Band. On 1 January 2006, the Armed Forces Trøndelag District Music Band was transferred to the RNoAF under its command structure and was named the Norwegian Air Force Band. In 2010, the band began using the building at 19 Kongens Gate in Oslo as their base of operations. Despite this, they play most of their concerts in Trondheim and have most rehearsals, music archives and offices located there. In 2015, LFMK received the Trondheim Municipality's cultural award in the professional arts and culture area.

== Notable collaborations and members ==
- Espen Aalberg
- Hayden Powell
- Bertil Palmar Johansen
- Geir Lysne
