= Battle of Midtskogen =

1940 battle of World War II

- Part of Norwegian campaign of the Second World War
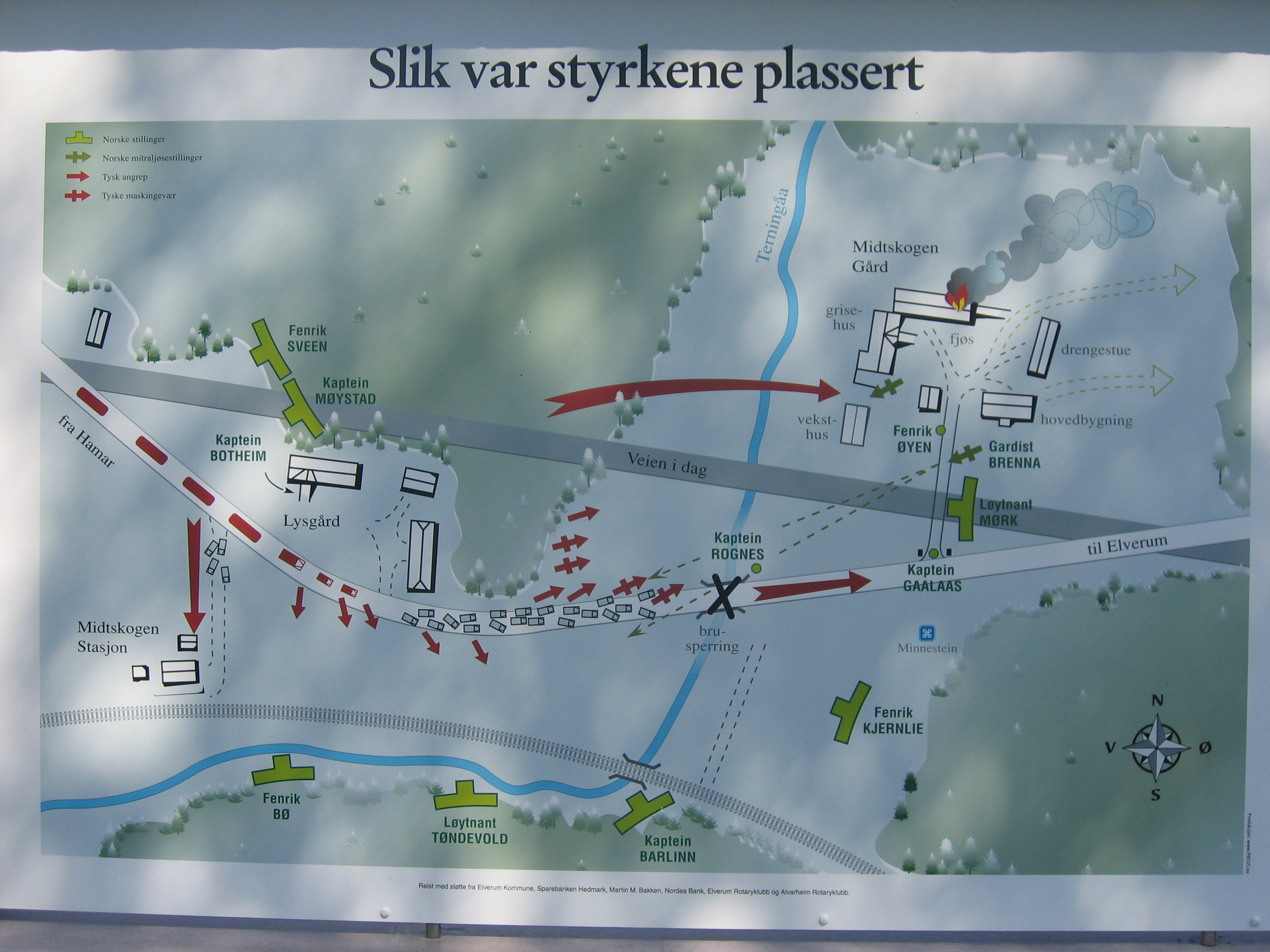
- Overview of battle
| Date | 10 April 1940 |
| Location | Elverum, Østerdalen, Norway 60°52′36″N 11°28′05″E |
| Result | Norwegian victory: Haakon VII and his government evade capture and consolidate power |

Belligerents
| Norway | Germany |

Commanders and leaders
| Olaf Helset; Oliver Møystad | Eberhard Spiller † |

Strength
| 1st Royal Guards Company Infantry regiment 5 Total: 90 soldiers, 2 Colt M/29 machine guns | 100+ paratroopers |

Casualties and losses
| 1 fatally wounded 1 wounded | 5 killed unknown number wounded |

The Battle of Midtskogen was a minor battle fought on the night of 9–10 April 1940 during the Second World War between a German raiding party and an improvised Norwegian force. The site of the battle was Midtskogen Farm, approximately 5 km (3.1 mi) west of the town of Elverum at the mouth of the Østerdalen valley in southern Norway. The invading German troops aimed to capture King Haakon VII and his cabinet, thereby forcing Norway into submission. After a short battle, the German force withdrew, having lost its commander in the fighting.

== Background ==
On 9 April 1940, Nazi Germany launched Operation Weserübung, the codename for the assault and subsequent occupation of Denmark and Norway.

Invading several major Norwegian cities by sea, the Germans planned to capture King Haakon VII and the Norwegian Cabinet, which they believed would then lead to an immediate surrender of all Norwegian forces.

While the invasion was successful in most areas, the German fleet sailing towards Oslo was temporarily forced to withdraw after the heavy cruiser Blücher had been sunk by fire from Oscarborg fortress at Drøbak. This gave the Norwegian royal family and members of the government time to flee to Hamar and later Elverum.

A small party of German Fallschirmjäger, under the command of military attaché Hauptmann Eberhard Spiller, was sent after them in commandeered Norwegian civilian vehicles.

== Opposing forces ==
The Norwegian defenders were a mixed group of hastily mustered volunteers and professional soldiers. About 20-30 Royal Guardsmen, from the 1st Guard Company, were backed up by volunteers from the Terningmoen military camp and a large group of members from local rifle clubs. The Norwegians were mainly armed with Krag–Jørgensen bolt-action rifles, as well as two Colt M/29 machine guns.

The German party consisted of approximately 100-120 paratroopers travelling in a convoy of four buses, a captured army truck, and Spiller's private car. Though somewhat numerically inferior, the Germans were vastly superior in terms of both training and firepower, possessing numerous modern submachine guns, light machine guns, and hand grenades.

== Initial plan of defence ==
The Norwegian battle plan was to have one blockade at Sagstuen, about 1.5 kilometres (0.93 mi) west of Terningmoen, and another at Midtskogen, another few kilometers further west. They planned to stop the German convoy at Midtskogen, forcing the Germans to continue on foot through the deep snow, before retreating to Sagstuen, where they would hold off the attackers.

The two machine guns were to focus their fire on the blockade, while the rifle companies would engage the Germans from the flanks.

== Battle ==
The blockade at Midtskogen consisted of stopped civilian cars, some forced off the road, with others wedged between and behind them. Due to the unusually heavy traffic that night, the blockade became over a hundred meters long.

At around 02:00 on 10 April, the German vehicles crashed into the Norwegian roadblock. Because of the length of the blockade, the Germans were stopped further west than the Norwegians had originally planned. While the Norwegian flanking units were being redeployed, they came under heavy fire from the Germans. During the ensuing firefight, the nearby barn at Midtskogen Farm was hit by German illumination rounds and started to burn, revealing the Norwegian defenders stationed at the farm.

Unfortunately for the Norwegians, their two machine guns were unable to engage the Germans due to the distance between their deployment and the firefight. It was not until the Germans started moving ahead of the blockade that they could open fire; however, due to cold temperatures, the machine guns initially refused to work. After frantic efforts, the Norwegians managed to get one of the machine guns working, enabling them to give covering fire to the retreating Norwegian forces.

The firefight continued until 03:00, ending with both forces pulling back. The Norwegians regrouped at Sagstuen, where they were reinforced by units from the Norwegian Military Academy. The Germans, with their commander Spiller badly wounded, realized their raid had failed and retreated to Oslo.

== Aftermath ==
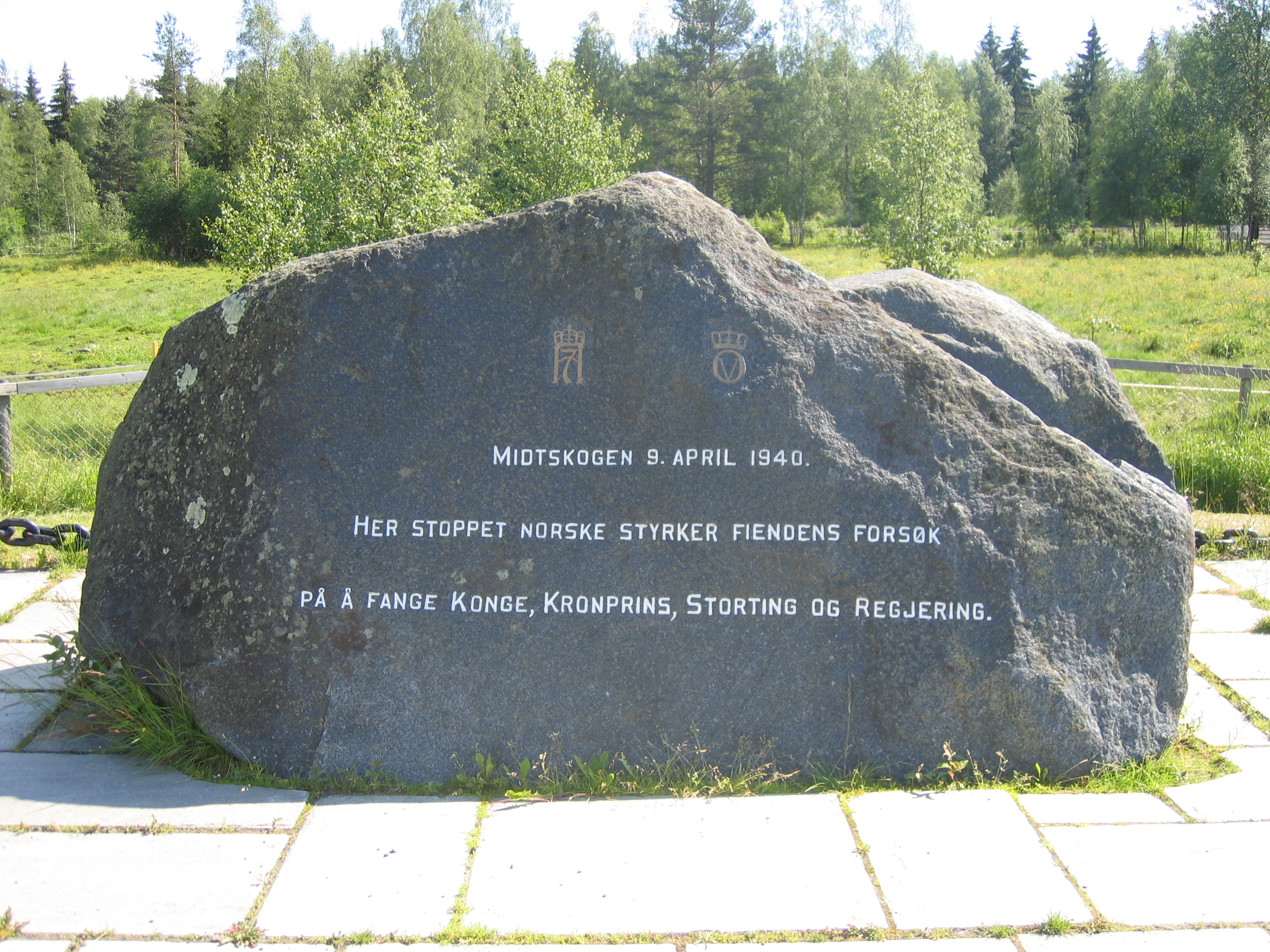
Memorial stone to commemorate the battle. "Here Norwegian forces stopped the enemy′s attempt at capturing the King, Crown Prince, Storting and Government".

The casualties on both sides were relatively light. The Germans suffered five men killed in action and an unknown number of wounded. One of the German fatalities was their military attaché Hauptmann Eberhard Spiller. Norwegian losses were three men wounded in action, with at least one being severely wounded.

The retreat of the German forces gave the Norwegian Cabinet and royal family time to finish the Elverum Authorization, which allowed the Cabinet to temporarily assert absolute authority, given that the Storting (the Norwegian Parliament) was no longer able to convene in ordinary session. It also allowed them to escape further from the invading forces.

On 11 April, the nearby town of Elverum was subjected to heavy bombing from German aircraft.

While the action may have been small, it proved a major boost to Norwegian morale and resolve, which had been very low due to the early German successes in the Norwegian Campaign.

== In popular culture ==
The battle is featured in the 2016 Norwegian film The King's Choice.

== See also ==
- List of Norwegian military equipment of World War II
- List of German military equipment of World War II

== Other sources ==
- Andreas Hauge: Kampen på Midtskogen 1940, article published 1995 (in Norwegian)
- Hauge, Andreas (1995 Kampene i Norge 1940 (Sandefjord: Krigshistorisk Forlag) ISBN 82-993369-0-2 (in Norwegian)
- NRK (Norwegian Broadcasting Corporation): Kampene ved Midtskogen natten til 10 april 1940. Intervju med noen av dem som var med. (Radio interview)
