= Colonel-in-chief =

Ceremonial position in a military regiment

Colonel-in-chief is a ceremonial position in an army regiment. It is in common use in several Commonwealth armies, where it is held by the regiment's patron, usually a member of the royal family.

Some armed forces take a light-hearted approach to the position, appointing animals or characters as colonel-in-chief. The Norwegian Army, for example, appointed a king penguin named Sir Nils Olav as a colonel-in-chief.

== History ==
Historically a colonel-in-chief was the ceremonial head of a regiment, usually a member of a European country's royal family. The practice extends at least back to 1740 in Prussia when Frederick II held that position (German: Regimentschef) in the newly created Garde du Corps, an elite heavy cavalry regiment.

By the late 19th century the designation could be given to the children of royalty; there are pictures of the daughters of Russian Czar Nicholas II in the uniforms of their regiments. The German Kaiser Wilhelm II carried the title to an extreme, holding it in dozens of German and (by diplomatic courtesy) Austro-Hungarian (called Inhaber), British, Russian, and Portuguese regiments. His mother, wife, son, and daughters were also full or deputy colonels-in-chief of various units.

== Role ==
In modern usage, the colonel-in-chief of a regiment is its (usually royal) patron, who has a ceremonial role in the life of the regiment. They do not have any operational role, or the right to issue orders, but are kept informed of all important activities of the regiment and pay occasional visits to its units. The chief purpose of the colonel-in-chief is to maintain a direct link between the regiment and the royal family. Some artillery regiments have a captain-general instead of a colonel-in-chief, but the posts are essentially the same.

The position of colonel-in-chief is distinct from the other ceremonial regimental posts of colonel of the regiment and honorary colonel, which are usually retired military officers or public figures with ties to the regiment.

Colonels-in-chief are appointed at the invitation of the regiment. While it is traditional for a royal personage to hold the position, it is at the discretion of each regiment whom they invite.

As of 2024, most colonels-in-chief in the British Army are members of the British royal family. However, one foreign monarch holds the position: King Abdullah II of Jordan, who is colonel-in-chief The Light Dragoons. King Abdullah served in the British Army as a troop commander in the 13th/18th Royal Hussars, which is now The Light Dragoons.

In the past non-royal persons have held, or been invited to hold, the post of colonel-in-chief. The Duke of Wellington was colonel-in-chief of the regiment that bore his name. The Governor General of Canada Adrienne Clarkson was invited to be colonel-in-chief of Princess Patricia's Canadian Light Infantry, while the Royal Australian Army Medical Corps has appointed every Governor-General of Australia since 2007 to serve as its colonel-in-chief.

The role has spread to other armies in the Commonwealth of Nations, at least in countries which have royal families.

== List of colonels-in-chief ==
=== United Kingdom ===
==== Royal Navy (styled Commodore-in-Chief) ====
- Plymouth, Royal Naval Command – King Charles III
- Aircraft Carriers – King Charles III
- Royal Navy Medical Service – Queen Camilla
- Royal Navy Chaplaincy Service – Queen Camilla
- Scotland – William, Prince of Wales
- Submarines – William, Prince of Wales
- Fleet Air Arm – Catherine, Princess of Wales
- Royal Fleet Auxiliary – Prince Edward, Duke of Edinburgh
- Portsmouth – Anne, Princess Royal
- Maritime Reserves – Prince Michael of Kent
- Small Ships and Diving – vacant
- Royal Marines – King Charles III (styled Captain General Royal Marines)
- Women in the Royal Navy – Anne, Princess Royal (styled Chief Commandant)

==== British Army ====
===== Household Cavalry and Royal Armoured Corps =====
====== Household Cavalry ======
- The Life Guards – King Charles III
  - Sir Edward Smyth-Osbourne (Colonel of the Regiment)
- The Blues and Royals (Royal Horse Guards and 1st Dragoons) – King Charles III
  - Anne, Princess Royal (Colonel of the Regiment)

====== Line Cavalry ======
- 1st The Queen's Dragoon Guards – Catherine, Princess of Wales
- The Royal Scots Dragoon Guards (Carabiniers and Greys) – King Charles III
  - Prince Edward, Duke of Kent (Deputy Colonel-in-Chief)
- The Royal Dragoon Guards – Prince Edward, Duke of Edinburgh
  - Katharine, Duchess of Kent (Deputy Colonel-in-Chief)
- The Queen's Royal Hussars (Queen's Own and Royal Irish) – Prince Edward, Duke of Edinburgh
- The Royal Lancers (Queen Elizabeths' Own) – Queen Camilla
- The King's Royal Hussars – Anne, Princess Royal
- The Light Dragoons – King Abdullah II of Jordan

====== Royal Tank Regiment ======
- The Royal Tank Regiment – King Charles III

====== Yeomanry ======
- The Royal Yeomanry – vacant
  - Princess Alexandra, The Honourable Lady Ogilvy (Royal Honorary Colonel)
- The Royal Wessex Yeomanry – vacant
  - Prince Edward, Duke of Edinburgh (Royal Honorary Colonel)
- The Queen's Own Yeomanry – vacant
  - Sophie, Duchess of Edinburgh (Royal Honorary Colonel)
- The Scottish and North Irish Yeomanry – vacant

===== Infantry =====
====== Foot Guards ======
- Grenadier Guards – King Charles III
  - Queen Camilla (Colonel of the Regiment)
- Coldstream Guards – King Charles III
  - Sir James Bucknall (Colonel of the Regiment)
- Scots Guards – King Charles III
  - Prince Edward, Duke of Edinburgh (Colonel of the Regiment)
- Irish Guards – King Charles III
  - Catherine, Princess of Wales (Colonel of the Regiment)
- Welsh Guards – King Charles III
  - William, Prince of Wales (Colonel of the Regiment)
- London Guards – vacant
  - Prince Edward, Duke of Edinburgh (Colonel of the Regiment)

====== Line Infantry and Rifles ======
- The Royal Regiment of Scotland – King Charles III
  - Anne, Princess Royal (Deputy Colonel-in-Chief)
  - Black Watch, 3rd Battalion, Royal Regiment of Scotland – King Charles III
  - 52nd Lowland, 6th Battalion, The Royal Regiment of Scotland – Anne, Princess Royal
  - 51st Highland, 7th Battalion The Royal Regiment of Scotland – King Charles III
- The Princess of Wales's Royal Regiment (Queen's and Royal Hampshires) – vacant
- The Duke of Lancaster's Regiment (King's, Lancashire and Border) – King Charles III
- The Royal Regiment of Fusiliers – Prince Edward, Duke of Kent
- The Royal Anglian Regiment – Prince Richard, Duke of Gloucester
- The Royal Yorkshire Regiment (14th/15th, 19th and 33rd/76th Foot) – vacant
- The Royal Welsh – King Charles III
- The Mercian Regiment (Cheshire, Worcesters and Foresters, and Staffords) – William, Prince of Wales
- Royal Irish Regiment – Sophie, Duchess of Edinburgh
- The Royal Gurkha Rifles – King Charles III
- The Rifles – Queen Camilla
  - 1st Battalion – Prince Edward, Duke of Kent (Royal Colonel)
  - 2nd Battalion – Prince Edward, Duke of Edinburgh (Royal Colonel)
  - 3rd Battalion – Princess Alexandra, The Honourable Lady Ogilvy (Royal Colonel)
  - 5th Battalion – Sophie, Duchess of Edinburgh (Royal Colonel)
  - 6th Battalion – Prince Richard, Duke of Gloucester (Royal Colonel)
  - 7th Battalion – Birgitte, Duchess of Gloucester (Royal Colonel)

====== Airborne Infantry ======
- The Parachute Regiment – King Charles III

====== Special Operations ======
- Ranger Regiment – vacant
  - 1st Battalion – Anne, Princess Royal
  - 4th Battalion – Queen Camilla

===== Special Forces =====
- Special Air Service – vacant
- Special Reconnaissance Regiment – Queen Camilla

===== Combat Support and Army Air Corps =====
- Army Air Corps – William, Prince of Wales
- Royal Regiment of Artillery – King Charles III (styled Captain-General)
- Corps of Royal Engineers – King Charles III
- Royal Corps of Signals – Anne, Princess Royal
  - Queen's Gurkha Signals – Anne, Princess Royal
- Intelligence Corps – Anne, Princess Royal
- Honourable Artillery Company – King Charles III (styled Captain-General)
  - Prince Michael of Kent (Royal Honorary Colonel)
- Royal Monmouthshire Royal Engineers (Militia) – vacant
  - Prince Richard, Duke of Gloucester (Royal Honorary Colonel)

===== Combat Service Support =====
- Royal Logistic Corps – Anne, Princess Royal
  - Katharine, Duchess of Kent (Deputy Colonel-in-Chief)
  - Prince Richard, Duke of Gloucester (Deputy Colonel-in-Chief)
  - 10 The Queen's Own Gurkha Logistic Regiment – Anne, Princess Royal
- Corps of Royal Electrical and Mechanical Engineers – Sophie, Duchess of Edinburgh
- Adjutant General's Corps – Birgitte, Duchess of Gloucester
  - Katharine, Duchess of Kent (Deputy Colonel-in-Chief)
  - Staff and Personnel Support – vacant
  - Educational and Training Services – vacant
  - Army Legal Services – vacant
  - Provost Branch – vacant
    - Royal Military Police – King Charles III
    - Military Provost Staff – vacant
    - Military Provost Guard Service – vacant
- Royal Corps of Army Music – Sophie, Duchess of Edinburgh
- Royal Army Chaplains' Department vacant
- Small Arms School Corps – vacant
- Royal Army Physical Training Corps – vacant
- General Service Corps – vacant

====== Army Medical Services ======
- Royal Army Medical Service – Prince Richard, Duke of Gloucester
- Royal Army Veterinary Corps – Anne, Princess Royal

===== Overseas Regiments =====
- The Royal Gibraltar Regiment – Governor of Gibraltar (ex officio)
- The Royal Bermuda Regiment – Birgitte, Duchess of Gloucester
- Royal Montserrat Defence Force – vacant
- Cayman Islands Regiment – vacant
- Turks and Caicos Islands Regiment – vacant
- Falkland Islands Defence Force – vacant

==== Royal Air Force (styled Honorary Air Commodore) ====
- Royal Air Force – King Charles III (styled Air Commodore-in-Chief)
- RAF Regiment – King Charles III (styled Air Commodore-in-Chief)
- RAF Regiment – Sir Stephen Dalton
- Royal Auxiliary Air Force – Prince Richard, Duke of Gloucester (styled Honorary Air Commodore-in-Chief)
- Royal Air Force Air Cadets – Catherine, Princess of Wales (styled Honorary Air Commandant)
- Princess Mary's Royal Air Force Nursing Service – Princess Alexandra, The Honourable Lady Ogilvy (styled Air Chief Commandant)
- RAF Ascension Island – vacant
- RAF Akrotiri – vacant
- RAF Benson – Prince Michael of Kent (styled Honorary Air Marshal)
- RAF Boulmer – vacant
- RAF Brize Norton – Anne, Princess Royal
- RAF Coningsby – Catherine, Princess of Wales (styled Royal Honorary Air Commodore)
- RAF Cosford – vacant
- RAF Cranwell – vacant
- RAF Digby – vacant
- RAF Gibraltar – vacant
- RAF Halton – Queen Camilla
- RAF Henlow – vacant
- RAF High Wycombe – vacant
- RAF Honington – vacant
- RAF Leeming – Queen Camilla
- RAF Lossiemouth – vacant
- RAF Marham – King Charles III
- RAF Northolt – vacant
- RAF Odiham – Prince Richard, Duke of Gloucester
- RAF Shawbury – vacant
- RAF Spadeadam – vacant
- RAF St Mawgan – vacant
- RAF Syerston – vacant
- RAF Valley – William, Prince of Wales (styled Royal Honorary Air Commodore)
- RAF Waddington – Prince Edward, Duke of Edinburgh
- RAF Wittering – Sophie, Duchess of Edinburgh
- RAF Woodvale – vacant
- RAF Wyton – vacant
- University of London Air Squadron – Anne, Princess Royal
- 501 (County of Gloucester) Squadron, Royal Auxiliary Air Force – Prince Richard, Duke of Gloucester
- 600 (City of London) Squadron, Royal Auxiliary Air Force – Hugh Trenchard, 3rd Viscount Trenchard
- 612 Squadron, Royal Auxiliary Air Force – Simon Arthur, 4th Baron Glenarthur
- 4626 Squadron, Royal Auxiliary Air Force – Maxwell Aitken, 3rd Baron Beaverbrook
- 7006 Squadron, Royal Auxiliary Air Force – Christopher Andrew
- 7630 Squadron, Royal Auxiliary Air Force – David Cousins

=== Antigua and Barbuda ===
- Antigua and Barbuda Regiment – King Charles III

=== Australia ===
- Royal Australian Armoured Corps – King Charles III
- Royal Regiment of Australian Artillery – King Charles III (styled Captain General)
- Corps of Royal Australian Engineers – vacant
- Royal Australian Corps of Signals – Anne, Princess Royal
- Royal Australian Infantry Corps – vacant
- Royal Australian Corps of Transport – Anne, Princess Royal
- Royal Australian Army Medical Corps – Governor-General of Australia (ex officio)
- Royal Australian Army Ordnance Corps – vacant
- Corps of Royal Australian Electrical and Mechanical Engineers – vacant
- Royal Australian Army Educational Corps – Birgitte, Duchess of Gloucester
- Royal Australian Corps of Military Police – Queen Camilla
- Royal Australian Army Nursing Corps – vacant

=== Brunei Darussalam ===
- Royal Brunei Armed Forces – Sultan Hassanal Bolkiah (styled Supreme Commander)

=== Canada ===
==== Canadian Army ====
===== Royal Canadian Armoured Corps =====
- Royal Canadian Dragoons – King Charles III
- Lord Strathcona's Horse (Royal Canadians) – King Charles III
- 8th Canadian Hussars (Princess Louise's) – Anne, Princess Royal
- Prince Edward Island Regiment (RCAC) – Prince Edward, Duke of Edinburgh
- South Alberta Light Horse – Sophie, Duchess of Edinburgh
- Saskatchewan Dragoons – Prince Edward, Duke of Edinburgh

===== Royal Canadian Infantry Corps =====
- The Royal Canadian Regiment – vacant
- Princess Patricia's Canadian Light Infantry – Adrienne Clarkson
- Royal 22nd Regiment – vacant
- Queen's Own Rifles of Canada – Queen Camilla
- Black Watch (Royal Highland Regiment) of Canada – King Charles III
- Royal Regiment of Canada – King Charles III
- Hastings and Prince Edward Regiment – Prince Edward, Duke of Edinburgh
- Lincoln and Welland Regiment – Sophie, Duchess of Edinburgh
- Grey and Simcoe Foresters – Anne, Princess Royal
- Lorne Scots (Peel, Dufferin and Halton Regiment) – Prince Edward, Duke of Kent
- Royal Winnipeg Rifles – King Charles III
- Essex and Kent Scottish – Prince Michael of Kent
- Royal Regina Rifles – Anne, Princess Royal
- Canadian Scottish Regiment (Princess Mary's) – Princess Alexandra, The Honourable Lady Ogilvy
- Irish Regiment of Canada – King Charles III
- Toronto Scottish Regiment (Queen Elizabeth The Queen Mother's Own) – King Charles III
- Royal Newfoundland Regiment – Anne, Princess Royal

===== Royal Canadian Engineers =====
- 31 Combat Engineer Regiment (The Elgin's) – Earl of Elgin (ex officio)

===== Personnel branches =====
- Royal Regiment of Canadian Artillery – King Charles III (styled Captain General)
- Communications and Electronics Branch – Anne, Princess Royal
- Royal Canadian Medical Service – Anne, Princess Royal
- Royal Canadian Dental Corps – Birgitte, Duchess of Gloucester

==== Other organisations ====
- Royal Canadian Mounted Police – King Charles III (styled Commissioner-in-Chief)

=== Jamaica ===
- Jamaica Regiment – King Charles III

=== Malaysia ===
==== Malaysian Army ====
===== Combat =====
- Royal Malay Regiment – Sultan Sallehuddin of Kedah
- Royal Ranger Regiment – Raja Sirajuddin of Perlis
- Royal Armoured Corps – Sultan Mizan Zainal Abidin of Terengganu
- Special Operations Regiment – Sultan Ibrahim Iskandar of Johor, the current King of Malaysia

===== Combat Support =====
- Royal Artillery Regiment and Royal Intelligence Corps – Sultan Muhammad V of Kelantan
- Royal Regiment of Engineers – Sultan Nazrin Shah of Perak
- Royal Signals Regiment – Tuanku Muhriz, Yang di-Pertuan Besar of Negeri Sembilan

===== Service Support =====
- Royal Service Corps – Sultan Sallehuddin of Kedah
- Royal Ordnance Corps – Sultan Mizan Zainal Abidin of Terengganu
- Royal Electrical and Mechanical Engineers Corps – Tuanku Muhriz, Yang di-Pertuan Besar of Negeri Sembilan

==== Royal Malaysian Air Force ====
- Royal Malaysian Air Force – Sultan Abdullah of Pahang (styled Air Commodore-in-Chief)

==== Royal Malaysian Navy ====
- Royal Malaysian Navy – Sultan Sharafuddin of Selangor (styled Commodore-in-Chief)

=== New Zealand ===
- New Zealand Corps of Officer Cadets – vacant
- Royal Regiment of New Zealand Artillery – King Charles III (styled Captain-General)
- Royal New Zealand Armoured Corps – vacant (styled Captain-General)
- Corps of Royal New Zealand Engineers – vacant
- Royal New Zealand Corps of Signals – Anne, Princess Royal
- Royal New Zealand Infantry Regiment – vacant
- New Zealand Special Air Service – vacant
- New Zealand Intelligence Corps – vacant
- Royal New Zealand Army Logistic Regiment – vacant
- Royal New Zealand Army Medical Corps – Prince Richard, Duke of Gloucester
- Royal New Zealand Dental Corps – vacant
- Royal New Zealand Chaplains Department – vacant
- New Zealand Army Legal Service – vacant
- Royal New Zealand Army Educational Corps – Birgitte, Duchess of Gloucester
- Corps of Royal New Zealand Military Police – vacant
- Royal New Zealand Nursing Corps – Anne, Princess Royal
- New Zealand Army Physical Training Corps – vacant

=== Norway ===
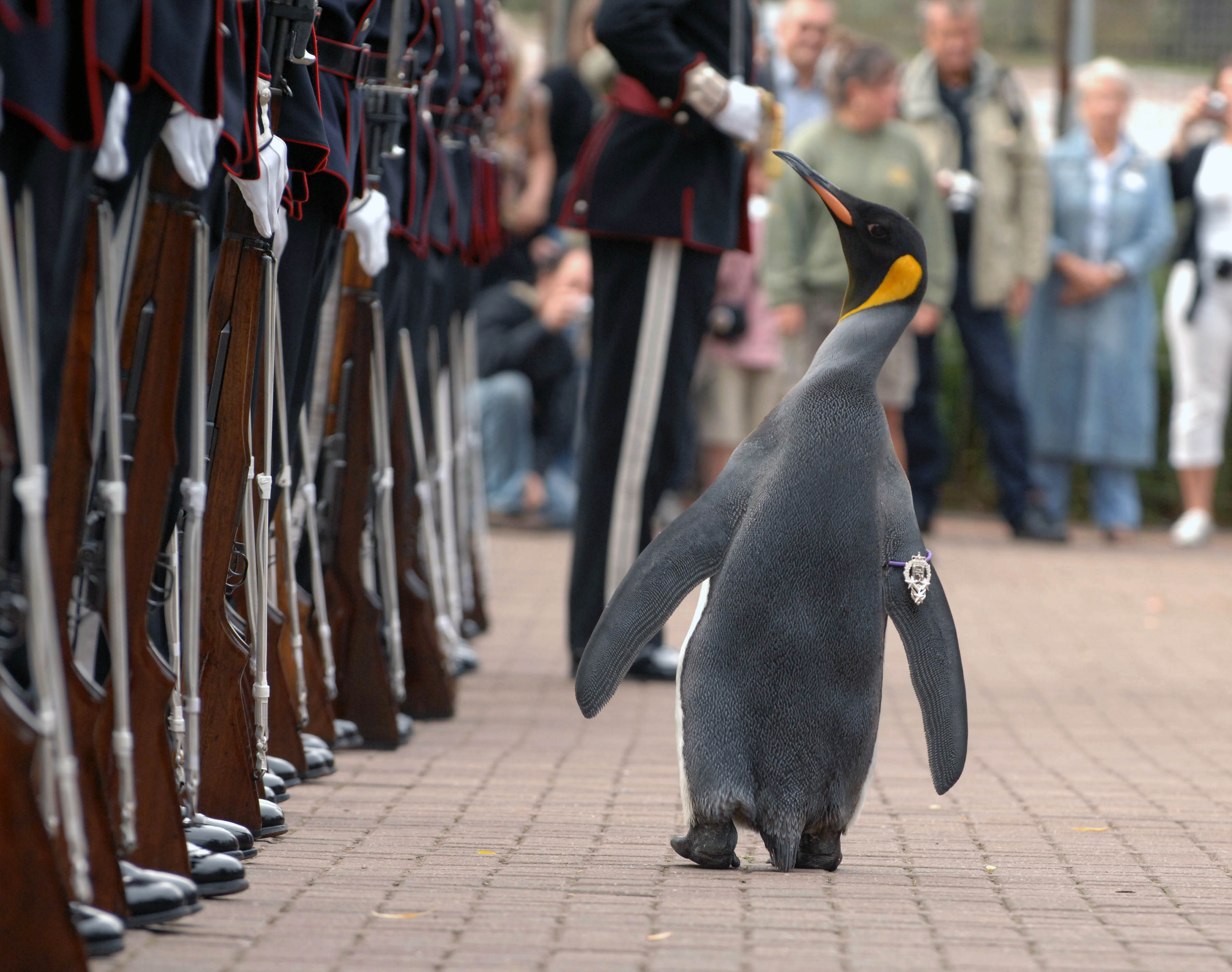
Sir Nils Olav (a king penguin) inspects troops of the Norwegian Royal Guard, of which he is Colonel-in-Chief

- His Majesty The King's Guard – Sir Nils Olav III

=== Papua New Guinea ===
- Royal Pacific Islands Regiment – King Charles III
