= His Majesty the King's Guard =

Coordinates: 59°56′36″N 10°39′31″E

His Majesty The King's Guard
- Bokmål: Hans Majestet Kongens Garde
- Active: 1856–present
- Country: Norway
- Allegiance: King of Norway
- Branch: Norwegian Army
- Type: Royal guard
- Size: 1300; 1100 conscripts 151 others
- Part of: Norwegian Army
- Garrison/HQ: Huseby leir, Oslo; Terningmoen, Elverum
- Nicknames: Garden; The Black Devils
- Mottos: Alt for Kongen! (Everything for the King!)
- March: Gardemarsj (Guards' March)
- Mascot: Nils Olav (king penguin)
- Anniversaries: 10 April; 1 November
- Engagements: Battle of Midtskogen; Battle of Lundehøgda

Commanders
- Commander of the Guard (Gardesjef): Lieutenant Colonel Henrik Hove
- Ceremonial chief: The King
- Colonel-in-Chief: Major General Sir Nils Olav III

His Majesty The King's Guard (Norwegian: Hans Majestet Kongens Garde) is a royal guard battalion of the Norwegian Army. The battalion has two main roles; it serves as the Norwegian King's bodyguards, guarding the royal residences (the Royal Palace in Oslo, Bygdøy Kongsgård and Skaugum) in Oslo, and is also the main infantry unit responsible for the defence of Oslo. The HMKG is located in Huseby leir in Oslo. Huseby leir is located on the old Oslo farm Nordre Huseby gård (Northern Huseby farm), which was acquired by the Norwegian government in the late 19th century.

== History ==
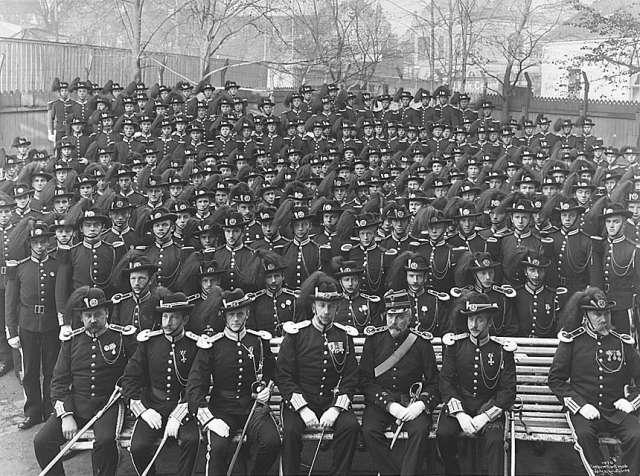
Guardsmen in 1906, shortly after the 1905 dissolution of the union with Sweden.

The first all-Norwegian unit of the royal guard of Sweden and Norway were a 38-man strong squadron of despatch riders from the Akerhusiske ridende Jægercorpses gevorbne Escadron, and its main function was to go as messengers between Stockholm and Christiania. By 1856 this service was obsolete, and the king decided to form a new Norwegian infantry company to be part of the guard.

The Norwegian guards company was formally formed from members of the Norwegian Corps of Jäger, mainly from Stjørdal Municipality, on 8 November 1856 by King Oscar I, in order to underline his status as king of both Norway and Sweden. The company moved from Stockholm to Kristiania in 1888, where, in addition to its guards duties, it served as a trials unit. On Norway's independence in 1905, the company became the new guards unit for King Haakon VII and was increased to battalion size. The battalion served with distinction during the Second World War, where it prevented the Wehrmacht from capturing the Royal Family and the Cabinet at the Midtskogen Gård on 10 April. This gave the Guards its first battle honour. Later in the campaign, the Guards fought with distinction on Dovrefjell and at Lundehøgda, near Lillehammer, winning their third battle honour. During the campaign in central Norway they were known among the German soldiers who fought them as "die schwarzen Teufel" or "the black devils", due to their ferocity and dark uniforms.

=== Drug testing scandal ===
In August 2022, 30 Royal Guards were discharged from the armed forces after a process that was said to involve drug testing; however, the chief of the Royal Guard said later in August that the hair samples were not analyzed, due to a "technical failure". Authorities had earlier in August claimed that the test kits that (allegedly) were used were not considered reliable, therefore the positive tests - the evidence - were not kept in evidence. "The ex-soldiers" are claiming that coercion was used; they were (allegedly) told that "the case" would be on their civilian police-record; however, the Norwegian Armed Forces went over to a new practice two years prior: drug cases do not get turned over to civilian police authorities. The drug tests in 2022 - by taking hair samples - were done by corporals; none of the personnel that work in the "narcotics group" of the military police, were present; the soldiers were given an impression that they would get reduced punishment if they admitted to illegal use of drugs; One soldier called the process a bluff so that one could elicit confessions. The chief of the armed forces' "narcotics group", says that drug tests can be done, however if they are done against specific suspects, then (each) drug test has to be part of (any number of individual) criminal cases. As of 26 August 2024, the Chief of Defence is satisfied with the report that he has been given. In December 2024, a trial is underway; six of the former soldiers are suing the government.

== Military organization ==
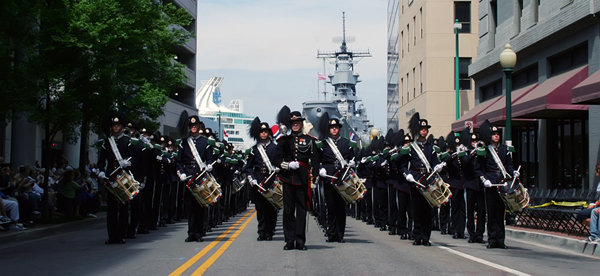
The KP3 marching in a parade in Norfolk, Virginia, during the 2009 Virginia International Tattoo.

The HMKG is organized as a light infantry battalion of five companies:

KP1	The oldest company; the only one up until 1889. Rifle company, consisting of one company staff platoon, and four rifle platoons (infantry and Urban Warfare/MOUT). KP1 fought invading Wehrmacht forces in the battle for Midtskogen Gård in Elverum in April 1940. Motto: First and foremost (Først og fremst).
KP2	Established in 1889. Rifle company. Similar structure to KP 1 and KP 4. Participated in World War II. Motto: Second to none
KP3	The renowned band & drill company, participating in military tattoos all over the world. Consists of three platoons: Music, Drums and Bugles, and Drill. Motto: Rhythm, elegance, precision (Rytme, eleganse, presisjon).
KP4	Founded in June 1919 and is known as the Red Horde or the Fighting Fourth. Rifle company. Similar structure to KP 1 and KP 2. Participated with half a platoon during the skirmish at Lundehøgda in April 1940. Motto: The Fighting Fourth.
KP5	Fifth Company is the company that "makes the wheels turn". The company supports the rest of the battalion with a variety of administrative and operational tasks, and is organised quite differently from the other companies. The company consists of a medical platoon, a mechanics and maintenance platoon, a command post (communications) platoon, a supplies/logistics platoon, Battalion support staff, and more. About half of the company are qualified guard soldiers, while the other half will not stand guard but will participate in parades. Motto: Style and strength (Stil og styrke).

Each of the rifle companies takes turns in carrying out guard duty at the royal residences in between other duties. The majority of Guardsmen are National Servicemen who are posted to the regiment after their basic training. On arriving at the battalion from basic training, they spend their first five weeks in ceaseless drill practice, hand-to-hand fighting, physical training, close range firing and case solving exercises before they are allowed to perform their first duties outside the royal palace or around the Royal Family's country residence. In addition the guards practice specialized operations within their platoons, and whenever a company becomes the oldest unit within the battalion (longest period of conscription), the company enters service as gardestridsgruppe (guard battle group), GSG, with a 72-hour emergency response time. The mission of the GSG is classified, but it was used during the 22 July attacks on Oslo in 2011.

The changing of the guard ceremony in front of The Palace takes place at 1330–1400 hours every day and is a popular event with tourists and the people of Oslo alike. In addition to performing guard duty, the Guards is also on parade whenever important state events take place in the capital. These include the annual opening of parliament by the King, visits by foreign heads of state, or anniversaries of major events in the history of the nation.

== Traditions ==
=== Uniform ===
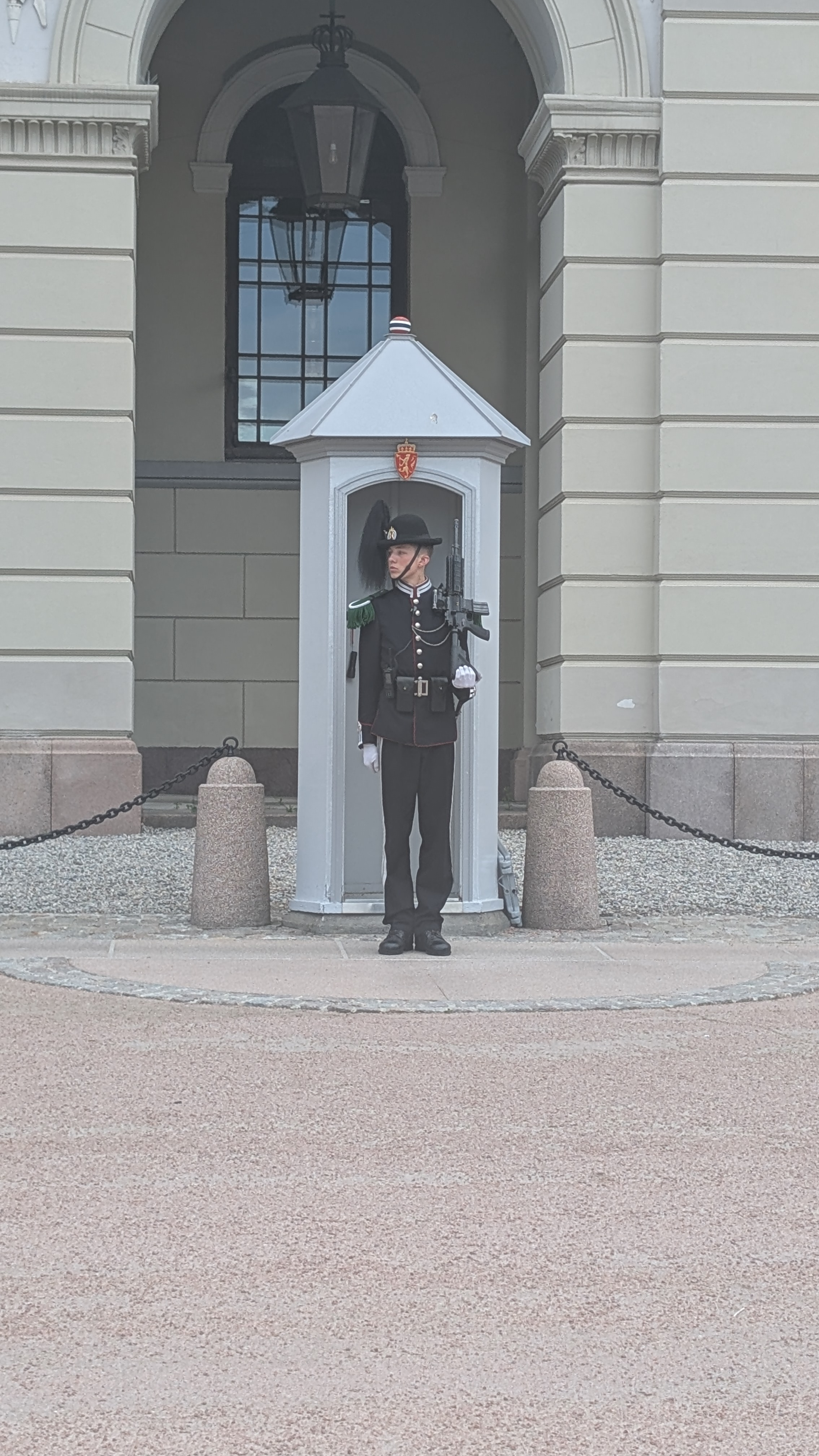
A member of the King's Guard on duty at the Royal Palace.

The dark blue dress uniforms have remained virtually unchanged throughout the regiment's existence. One noteworthy detail of the uniform is the plumed bowler hat, which was copied from the hat of the Italian Bersaglieri troops—a regiment that so impressed Queen Louise that she insisted the Norwegian guards be similarly hatted in 1860. The regiment's cap badge is a rosette in the royal colours of Norway, with the monogram of the current monarch.

=== Nils Olav ===
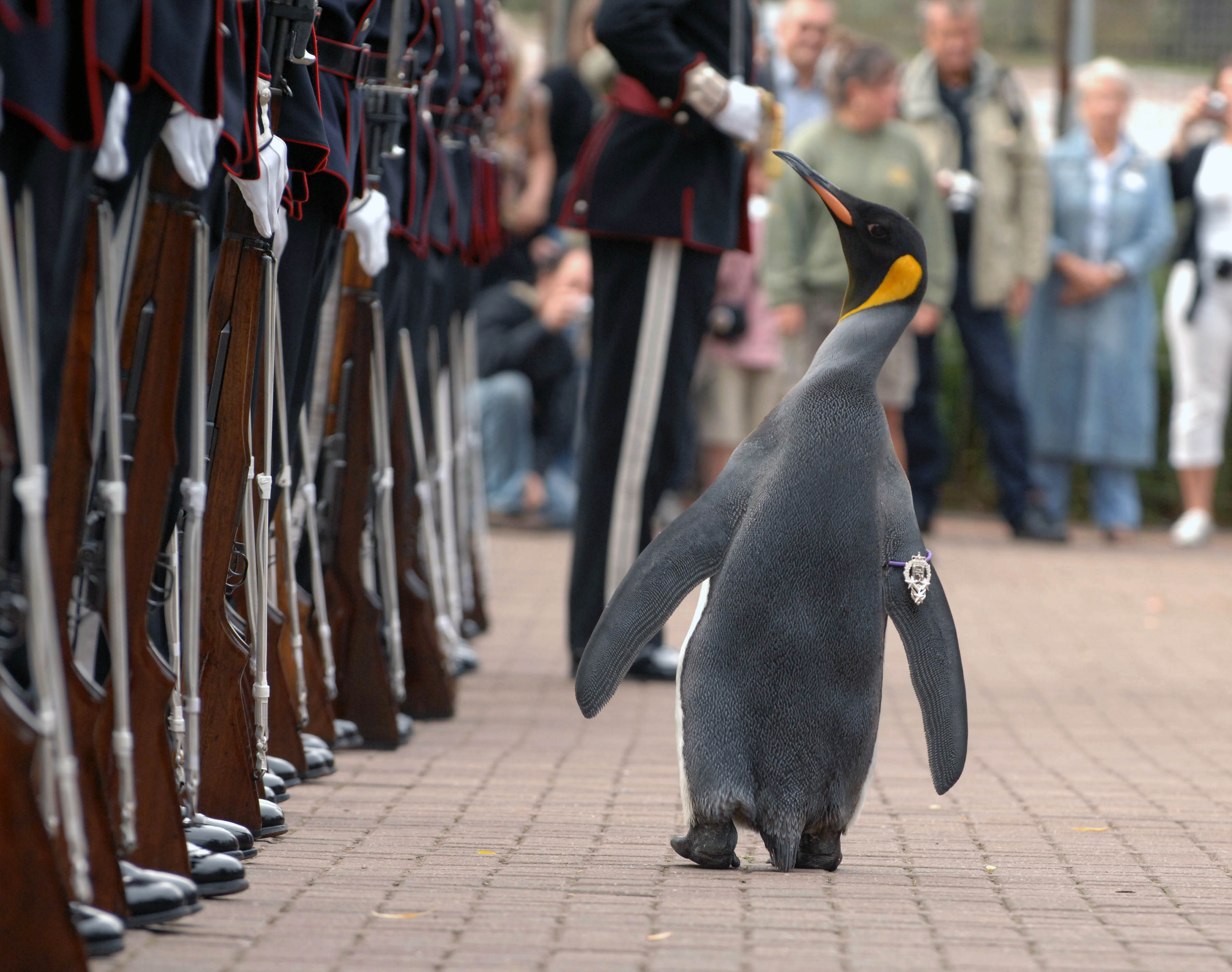
Sir Nils Olav inspecting troops of the royal guard, of which he is Colonel-in-Chief, in 2008

The regiment's official mascot is a king penguin named Nils Olav, a resident of Edinburgh Zoo. The first penguin was adopted during the regiment's first participation in the Edinburgh Military Tattoo in 1961 and was given the rank of visekorporal (lance corporal). Nils Olav was promoted each time the King's Guard has returned to the Tattoo. In 1982 he was made corporal and was promoted to sergeant in 1987. Nils Olav died shortly after his promotion to sergeant, and his place of honour was taken by Nils Olav II, his two-year-old near-double. He was promoted in 1993 to the rank of regimental sergeant major. On 18 August 2005 he was promoted to Colonel-in-Chief. Nils Olav was the first penguin to hold this rank in the Norwegian army. He was also awarded the Norwegian Army's Long Service and Good Conduct medal on that date.

The current mascot is Nils Olav III, who on 15 August 2008 was knighted, then on 22 August 2016 he was promoted to the rank of Brigadier at a ceremony outside the zoo's penguin enclosure by British Major General Euan Loudon acting on behalf of Norway's King Harald V. Reuters reported that a detachment of the King's Guard in full dress uniform was reviewed by the penguin, who wore his new insignia on a badge strapped to one flipper.

=== Standards ===
Standard between 1991 and 2026 under Harald V

Standard between 1957 and 1991 under Olav V

Standard between 1914 and 1957 under Haakon VII

== Alliances ==
- United Kingdom - The Yorkshire Regiment (14th/15th, 19th and 33rd/76th Foot) (Bond of Friendship)
