= Huseby Leir =

Norwegian military installation

Coordinates: 59°56′35″N 10°39′31″E

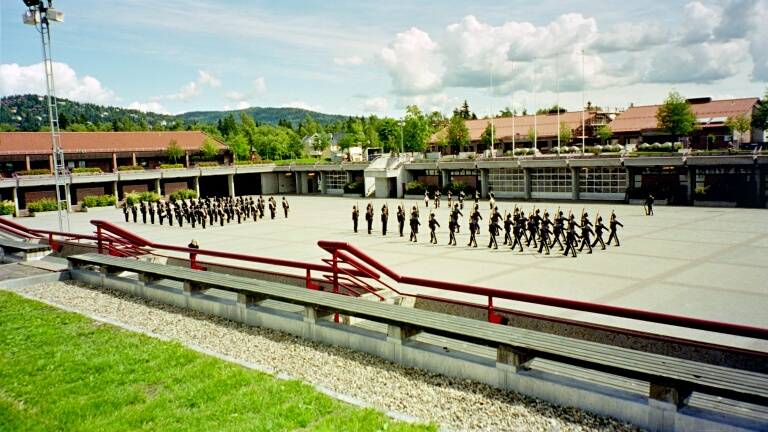
Huseby Leir, Oslo, drill yard

Huseby Leir is the base of the Norwegian Hans Majestet Kongens Garde (HMKG) (lit., His Majesty The King's Guard). Huseby Leir is located on the old Oslo farm, Nordre Huseby gård, which was acquired by the Norwegian government in the late 19th century.

It is a modern base, but has decayed because of construction errors which led to mold and damp damage in walls and roofs. From 2002 to 2005 the base underwent a total renovation. Huseby Leir is a very special base in military terms, since it is constructed in two levels. Offices and barracks are located on ground level. The lower "0-level" features the drill yard for all companies, a crew dining hall, an armoury, an indoor shooting range, a sport hall, a clothes depot, a sew parlour, a gas station, parking places for military vehicles, and a number of other areas serving the needs for the battalion. Parts of the "0-level" has a photography restriction and the layout of some areas of the structure is classified, yet some parts of the "0-level" can be seen from ground level.
